= 2009 BAFL season =

The 2009 BAFL Season is the British American Football League. BritBowl XXIII, the league's championship game, was scheduled to be played at Keepmoat Stadium in Doncaster on 27 September 2009.

== Schedule ==
=== Regular season ===
==== Formula ====
Based on the British American Football League, setup for the 2009 season there will be a 3 tier structure consisting of:

Division	Teams
BAFL Premier	5
BAFL 1 North Conference	7
BAFL 1 South East Conference	6
BAFL 1 South West Conference	6
BAFL 2 Central Conference	6
BAFL 2 East Conference	4
BAFL 2 North Conference	4
BAFL 2 Scottish Conference	4
BAFL 2 South East Conference	4
BAFL 2 South West Conference	5

== Regular season standings ==
W = Wins, L = Losses, T = Ties, PCT = Winning Percentage, PF= Points for, PA = Points against

Clinched playoff seeds are shaded in green.

=== BAFL Premier standings ===
BAFL Premier
Team	W	L	T	PCT	PF	PA
London Blitz	8	0	0	1.000	304	43
Coventry Cassidy Jets	5	3	0	0.625	145	142
Bristol Aztecs	5	3	0	0.625	180	186
Farnham Fast Lane Knights	2	6	0	0.250	133	231
Sussex Thunder	0	8	0	0.000	64	224

=== BAFL Division 1 standings ===
BAFL 1 – North
Team	W	L	T	PCT	PF	PA
East Kilbride Pirates	8	1	1	0.850	311	117
Doncaster Mustangs	6	3	1	0.650	356	257
Gateshead Senators	6	3	1	0.650	170	190
Yorkshire Rams	5	4	1	0.550	230	188
Dundee Hurricanes	2	6	1	0.278	133	209
Merseyside Nighthawks	2	7	1	0.250	180	242
West Coast Trojans	2	7	0	0.222	119	203

BAFL 1 – South East
Team	W	L	T	PCT	PF	PA
London Cobras	9	0	1	0.950	322	51
Kent Exiles	7	3	0	0.700	362	253
Cambridgeshire Cats	7	3	0	0.700	373	281
Ipswich Cardinals	4	6	0	0.364	213	233
Peterborough Saxons	2	7	0	0.222	140	259
Norwich Devils	0	8	1	0.056	84	417

BAFL 1 – South West
Team	W	L	T	PCT	PF	PA
Tamworth Phoenix	9	1	0	0.900	317	52
Oxford Saints	8	2	0	0.800	192	91
South Wales Warriors	6	4	0	0.600	194	86
Birmingham Bulls	4	6	0	0.400	92	123
Nottingham Caesars	2	8	0	0.200	73	213
Redditch Arrows	1	9	0	0.100	20	323

=== BAFL Division 2 standings ===
==== Northern section ====
BAFL 2 – Scottish
Team	W	L	T	PCT	PF	PA
Glasgow Tigers	8	2	0	0.800	191	66
Clyde Valley Blackhawks	6	4	0	0.600	307	117
Edinburgh Wolves	6	4	0	0.600	186	137
Highland Wildcats	0	10	0	0.000	31	442
BAFL 2 – North
Team	W	L	T	PCT	PF	PA
Manchester Titans	10	0	0	1.000	364	52
Lancashire Wolverines	5	4	1	0.550	232	193
Chester Romans	2	7	1	0.250	107	178
Hull Hornets	2	8	0	0.200	92	294
BAFL 2 – Central
Team	W	L	T	PCT	PF	PA
Staffordshire Surge	8	2	0	0.800	251	58
Leicester Falcons	7	2	1	0.750	294	87
Shropshire Revolution	5	4	1	0.550	300	117
Lincolnshire Bombers	0	10	0	0.000	18	464

==== Southern section ====
BAFL 2 – East
Team	W	L	T	PCT	PF	PA
Colchester Gladiators	9	0	1	0.950	431	54
Bedfordshire Blue Raiders	8	2	0	0.800	203	73
Watford Cheetahs	4	6	0	0.400	157	197
Milton Keynes City Pathfinders	1	9	0	0.100	32	406
BAFL 2 – South East
Team	W	L	T	PCT	PF	PA
East Kent Mavericks	8	1	1	0.850	322	45
London Olympians	8	2	0	0.800	274	94
Essex Spartans	1	8	1	0.150	64	237
Maidstone Pumas	0	9	1	0.050	44	441
BAFL 2 – South West
Team	W	L	T	PCT	PF	PA
Hampshire Thrashers	8	0	2	0.900	371	62
Cornish Sharks	7	2	1	0.750	295	65
Gloucester Banshees	3	6	1	0.350	158	259
Berkshire Renegades	3	7	0	0.300	142	289
Plymouth Admirals	0	10	0	0.000	68	476

== Playoffs ==
The playoffs are scheduled to be played on 5/6 September 2009. BritBowl XXIII will then be played on 27 September 2009 at Keepmoat Stadium in Doncaster.

=== BAFL Premier Playoff ===
Seed	Teams
1	London Blitz
2	Coventry Jets
3	Bristol Aztecs
4	Farnham Knights

==== BAFL Premier Championship Game/BritBowl ====
Semi-finals			BritBowl
1	London Blitz	33
4	Farnham Knights	13	1	London Blitz	26
2	Coventry Jets	28	2	Coventry Jets	7
3	Bristol Aztecs	14

=== BAFL 1 Playoff ===
Seed	Teams
1	London Cobras
2	Tamworth Phoenix
3	East Kilbride Pirates
4	Oxford Saints
5	Cambridgeshire Cats
6	Gateshead Senators
7	Kent Exiles
8	Doncaster Mustangs

==== BAFL 1 Championship Game ====
Quarterfinals
1	London Cobras	66
8	Doncaster Mustangs	0
4	Oxford Saints	13
5	Cambridgeshire Cats	25
2	Tamworth Phoenix	27
7	Kent Exiles	20
3	East Kilbride Pirates	28
6	Gateshead Senators	0

Semifinals
1	London Cobras	22
5	Cambridgeshire Cats	6
2	Tamworth Phoenix	0
3	East Kilbride Pirates	25

Finals
1	London Cobras	8
3	East Kilbride Pirates	0

=== BAFL 2 Playoff ===
The BAFL 2 Playoffs are split geographically between the North and the South. The Southern half of the draw includes the conferences champions from each of the East, South East and South West. The Northern half includes conferences champions from the Scottish, Northern and Central conferences. There is a wild card team from each of the North and the South.

Seed	Southern Section	Northern Section
1	Colchester Gladiators	Manchester Titans
2	Hampshire Thrashers	Staffordshire Surge
3	East Kent Mavericks	Glasgow Tigers
4	Bedfordshire Blue Raiders	Leicester Falcons

==== BAFL 2 Championship Game ====
Quarterfinals
1	Manchester Titans	15
4	Leicester Falcons	39
2	Staffordshire Surge	0
3	Glasgow Tigers	12
1	Colchester Gladiators	41
4	Bedfordshire Blue Raiders	16
2	Hampshire Thrashers	24
3	East Kent Mavericks	6

Semifinals
4	Leicester Falcons	7
3	Glasgow Tigers	6
1	Colchester Gladiators	49
2	Hampshire Thrashers	20

Finals
4	Leicester Falcons	33
1	Colchester Gladiators	32

== See also ==
- BritBowl
