= 2008 BAFL season =

The 2008 BAFL Season is the British American Football League. BritBowl XXII, the league's championship game, was scheduled to be played at Keepmoat Stadium in Doncaster on September 21, 2008. The regular season began on May 4 with the BritBowl champions London Blitz defeating the Gateshead Senators 48-0.

== Schedule ==
=== Regular season ===
==== Formula ====
Based on the British American Football League, setup for the 2008 season there will be a 3 tier structure consisting of:

| Division | Teams |
|---|---|
| BAFL Premier | 7 |
| BAFL 1 North | 6 |
| BAFL 1 South | 6 |
| BAFL 2 Central Conference | 6 |
| BAFL 2 East Conference | 5 |
| BAFL 2 North Conference | 6 |
| BAFL 2 South East Conference | 5 |
| BAFL 2 South West Conference | 5 |

== Final regular season standings ==
W = Wins, L = Losses, T = Ties, PCT = Winning Percentage, PF= Points For, PA = Points Against

Clinched playoff seeds are marked in parentheses and shaded in green, for BAFL 2 divisions the colours have been changed to indicate Northern and Southern sides of the Playoffs.

=== BAFL Premier standings ===
BAFL Premier
| Team | W | L | T | PCT | PF | PA |
| (1) Coventry Cassidy Jets | 8 | 0 | 0 | 1.000 | 265 | 64 |
| (2) London Blitz | 6 | 2 | 0 | 0.750 | 219 | 129 |
| (3) Farnham Fast Lane Knights | 5 | 3 | 0 | 0.625 | 263 | 128 |
| (4) Bristol Aztecs | 4 | 4 | 0 | 0.500 | 195 | 131 |
| East Kilbride Pirates | 4 | 4 | 0 | 0.500 | 138 | 196 |
| Birmingham Bulls | 1 | 7 | 0 | 0.125 | 18 | 233 |
| Gateshead Senators | 0 | 0 | 8 | 0.000 | 26 | 243 |

=== BAFL Division 1 standings ===
BAFL 1 - North
| Team | W | L | T | PCT | PF | PA |
| (1) Redditch Arrows | 7 | 2 | 1 | 0.750 | 285 | 85 |
| (3) Yorkshire Rams | 7 | 2 | 1 | 0.750 | 215 | 101 |
| Dundee Hurricanes | 5 | 2 | 3 | 0.650 | 227 | 91 |
| West Coast Trojans | 4 | 4 | 2 | 0.500 | 188 | 170 |
| South Yorkshire Mustangs | 3 | 7 | 0 | 0.300 | 114 | 274 |
| Staffordshire Surge | 0 | 9 | 1 | 0.050 | 73 | 381 |
BAFL 1 - South
| Team | W | L | T | PCT | PF | PA |
| (2) Sussex Thunder | 7 | 3 | 0 | 0.700 | 154 | 76 |
| (4) Southern Sundevils | 6 | 4 | 0 | 0.600 | 165 | 110 |
| Kent Exiles | 6 | 4 | 0 | 0.600 | 162 | 124 |
| Ipswich Cardinals | 5 | 5 | 0 | 0.500 | 167 | 175 |
| Oxford Saints | 4 | 5 | 1 | 0.450 | 143 | 169 |
| Norwich Devils | 1 | 8 | 1 | 0.150 | 104 | 241 |

=== BAFL Division 2 standings ===
| Northern Section Playoff | Southern Section Playoff |

BAFL 2 - Central Conference
| Team | W | L | T | PCT | PF | PA |
| (1) Nottingham Caesars | 9 | 0 | 1 | 0.950 | 269 | 55 |
| (3) Tamworth Phoenix | 6 | 2 | 2 | 0.700 | 230 | 50 |
| Shropshire Revolution | 5 | 5 | 0 | 0.500 | 209 | 127 |
| Hull Hornets | 3 | 4 | 3 | 0.450 | 94 | 143 |
| Leicester Falcons | 3 | 5 | 2 | 0.400 | 107 | 176 |
| Lincolnshire Bombers | 0 | 10 | 0 | 0.000 | 58 | 416 |
BAFL 2 - East Conference
| Team | W | L | T | PCT | PF | PA |
| (2) Cambridgeshire Cats | 9 | 1 | 0 | 0.900 | 336 | 45 |
| (4) Peterborough Saxons | 8 | 2 | 0 | 0.800 | 379 | 44 |
| Bedfordshire Blue Raiders | 4 | 6 | 0 | 0.400 | 128 | 197 |
| Watford Cheetahs | 2 | 7 | 1 | 0.250 | 94 | 304 |
| Milton Keynes City Pathfinders | 0 | 9 | 1 | 0.050 | 60 | 445 |
BAFL 2 - North Conference
| Team | W | L | T | PCT | PF | PA |
| (2) Merseyside Nighthawks | 8 | 2 | 0 | 0.800 | 258 | 107 |
| (4) Lancashire Wolverines | 6 | 4 | 0 | 0.600 | 260 | 171 |
| Manchester Titans | 6 | 4 | 0 | 0.600 | 232 | 222 |
| Edinburgh Wolves | 5 | 5 | 0 | 0.500 | 168 | 1554 |
| Glasgow Tigers | 5 | 5 | 0 | 0.500 | 117 | |
| Chester Romans | 0 | 10 | 0 | .000 | 60 | 332 |
BAFL 2 - South East Conference
| Team | W | L | T | PCT | PF | PA |
| (1) London Cobras | 10 | 0 | 0 | 1.000 | 382 | 9 |
| (6) Colchester Gladiators | 7 | 3 | 0 | 0.700 | 263 | 180 |
| East Kent Mavericks | 6 | 4 | 0 | 0.600 | 225 | 193 |
| Essex Spartans | 1 | 8 | 1 | 0.150 | 126 | 343 |
| Maidstone Pumas | 1 | 9 | 0 | 0.100 | 109 | 395 |
BAFL 2 - South West Conference
| Team | W | L | T | PCT | PF | PA |
| (3) South Wales Warriors | 9 | 1 | 0 | 0.900 | 233 | 47 |
| (5) Cornish Sharks | 7 | 3 | 0 | 0.600 | 141 | 60 |
| Hampshire Thrashers | 6 | 4 | 0 | 0.600 | 232 | 119 |
| Plymouth Admirals | 2 | 8 | 0 | 0.200 | 88 | 225 |
| Reading Renegades | 1 | 8 | 1 | 0.150 | 88 | 283 |

== Playoffs ==
The playoffs are scheduled to start on August 24, 2008. BritBowl XXII will then be played on September 21, 2008 at Keepmoat Stadium in Doncaster.

=== BAFL Premier Playoff ===
| Seed | Teams |
|---|---|
| 1 | Coventry Cassidy Jets |
| 2 | London Blitz |
| 3 | Farnham Fast Lane Knights |
| 4 | Bristol Aztecs |

==== BAFL Premier Championship Game/BritBowl ====
| Semifinals | | | BritBowl |
| 1 | Coventry Cassidy Jets | 31 |
| 4 | Bristol Aztecs | 28 | 1 | Coventry Cassidy Jets | 33 |
| 2 | London Blitz | 28 | 2 | London Blitz | 32 |
| 3 | Farnham Fast Lane Knights | 15 |

=== BAFL 1 Playoff ===
| Seed | Teams |
|---|---|
| 1 | Redditch Arrows |
| 2 | Sussex Thunder |
| 3 | Yorkshire Rams |
| 4 | Southern Sundevils |

==== BAFL 1 Championship Game ====
| Semifinals | | | Championship Game |
| 1 | Redditch Arrows | 30 |
| 4 | Southern Sundevils | 22 | 1 | Redditch Arrows | 18 |
| 2 | Sussex Thunder | 26 | 2 | Sussex Thunder | 20 |
| 3 | Yorkshire Rams | 16 |

=== BAFL 2 Playoff ===
The BAFL 2 Playoffs are split geographically between the North and the South. The Southern half of the draw includes the top two teams from each of the East, South East and South West. With the top two from the Northern and Central conferences making up the Northern half.

| Seed | Southern Section | Northern Section |
|---|---|---|
| 1 | London Cobras | Nottingham Caesars |
| 2 | Cambridgeshire Cats | Merseyside Nighthawks |
| 3 | South Wales Warriors | Tamworth Phoenix |
| 4 | Peterborough Saxons | Lancashire Wolverines |
| 5 | Cornish Sharks | |
| 6 | Colchester Gladiators | |

== Bracket ==
August 24 | August 31
5 | Cornish Sharks | 9
1 | London Cobras | 42
4 | Peterborough Saxons | 6 | September 7
5 | Cornish Sharks | 3
AFC
August 24 | 1 | London Cobras | 32
August 31
2 | Cambridgeshire Cats | 0
3 | South Wales Warriors | 21 | AFC Championship
3 | South Wales Warriors | 7
6 | Colchester Gladiators | 12 | September 21 - Keepmoat Stadium, Doncaster
2 | Cambridgeshire Cats | 21
Wild Card playoffs
Divisional playoffs
London Cobras | 30
August 31
Tamworth Phoenix | 6
BAFL 2 Championship
2 | Merseyside Nighthawks | 0
September 7
3 | Tamworth Phoenix | 12
NFC
3 | Tamworth Phoenix | 16
August 31
1 | Nottingham Caesars | 10
NFC Championship
1 | Nottingham Caesars | 49
4 | Lancashire Wolverines | 23

== See also ==
- BritBowl
