= Berkshire Renegades =

American Football team based in the UK

Logo

General information
- Founded: 1985; 41 years ago
- Stadium: University of Reading
- Headquartered: Reading, Berkshire, England

Personnel
- General manager: Shaun 'Kiwi' Blake
- Head coach: Pat Joseph

League / conference affiliations
- BAFA Community Leagues; SFC 2 West

Championships
- Division championships: 0; 2017

Current uniform
Home

Away

Berkshire Renegades (formerly the Reading Renegades) are an American football team currently competing in the BAFANL SFC 2 West play their home games at the University of Reading in Reading, Berkshire.

== Background ==
First formed in 1985, they competed in the United Kingdom American Football Association, the Budweiser League, the Combined Gridiron League and the British National Gridiron League before folding in 1990. They were reformed in 2005 and entered the BAFL the following year. At the conclusion of the 2009 season, the BAFL ceased to operate and the Berkshire Renegades joined the BAFA Community Leagues. At the conclusion of the 2011 Season the Berkshire Renegades were invited to compete in the BAFA National Leagues Division 1 for the 2012 Season. The team accepted and were placed in Division 1 Central & South. At the conclusion of the 2012 season, the BAFANL decided to re-align the league once again and the Renegades were put in the Premier South division.

== History ==
=== Original Reading Renegades: 1985 to 1990 ===
After their formation, the Renegades were admitted into the United Kingdom American Football Association in 1985 where they competed in the Eastern Conference. They finished with a 3–5 record, narrowly missing out on a playoff spot to the Dunstable Cowboys.

The following year, the Renegades transferred over to the Budweiser League, where they competed in the Central conference of Division One. They soon got into their stride, recording a hard-fought win away to the Farnham Knights in their second game, and went on to have a consistent season which saw them win six out of their ten matches. They ultimately finished fourth out of eleven teams – however, due to the format of the league at that time, only the top placed team from each group in Division One qualified for the playoffs (which also included the top four teams from the Premier Division conferences along with the Plymouth Admirals, who finished as the top-performing team in Division Two) and so the Renegades were denied any post-season action. 1987 was to prove a much worse season, with the team failing to register a single win and only a tie gained against Salford-based team the Huskies helping them to avoid a complete washout.

After sitting out the 1988 season, the Renegades returned to senior action in 1989 when they joined the Combined Gridiron League. Placed in the four-team Southern Conference, they had an indifferent season which saw them finish with a 3–3 record, once again missing out on the playoffs.

After just one season in the CGL, the Reading Renegades transferred over to the British National Gridiron League where they competed in the First Division Southern Conference. Unfortunately, this new competition brought no joy and the Renegades finished bottom of the table, recording just one win at home to the Wight Rhinos. The club folded shortly after the season ended.

=== Current Berkshire Renegades: 2006 to present ===
In 2004 the Renegades were restarted by former general manager Oliver Raffle and a small group of American Football enthusiasts. This core group helped to build the team that is currently in place today after many hours work during 2005 and through the club's successful application to join the BAFL at the end of 2005.

The team entered the league in the Western Conference of Division Two, a conference which included three of the teams currently competing in the same conference as the Renegades. As an expansion team re-entering the league after 15 years away, they always found the going difficult and lost all ten of their matches, failing to score in four of them and conceding one game to the South Wales Warriors.

The 2007 season started off positively for the Renegades, including a narrow 6–12 loss to a very strong South Wales Warriors side. The first victory came against the Plymouth Admirals, with the winning touchdown scored with only 15 seconds remaining to secure a 25–21 win. This was followed up with a narrow 13–12 victory over the Chiltern Cheetahs. Unfortunately after the promising 2–3 start to the season, the team finished a disappointing 2–8.

The 2008 season saw a new Head Coach Phil de Monte take the reins from outgoing Head Coach Russ Seymour. Although the season started out well with a win, the team soon collapsed back to losing ways. Part way through the season Head Coach de Monte tendered his resignation and Offensive Coordinator Paul Gordon stepped up to carry out the Head Coach duties until the end of the season. The team forfeited a fixture to Cornish Sharks on grounds of safety as they lacked a sufficient number of uninjured players to compete effectively. The season ended on a 6–6 draw against Essex Spartans.

The 2009 season saw Paul Gordon take on the role of Head Coach full-time. The 2009 season was a period of improvement for the Renegades and their final record of 3 wins and 7 losses reflected an improved team. Two wins over Plymouth Admirals and one over league newcomers Gloucester Banshees ended the season for the team.

The 2010 season and the dissolution of the BAFL meant the Berkshire Renegades joined the BAFA Community Leagues in Division 2 South West and saw the addition of two new teams as inter-divisional rivals: Watford Cheetahs and Milton Keynes City Pathfinders. The 2010 season was a break-out season for the team recording 6 wins and 4 losses and appearing for the first time in the playoffs. The team beat rivals Cornish Sharks at home 20–0 and then beat divisional front-runners Watford Cheetahs 40–3. The first loss of the season came against Hampshire Thrashers in a very close 13–16 loss. 2 more wins followed before a break of almost a month. The break hurt the team and momentum was lost as the team lost the next three matches against Milton Keynes City Pathfinders, Cornish Sharks and Hampshire Thrashers. The final game of the season was a 28–13 win over Gloucester Banshees and other results from the league meant that Berkshire retained the tie breakers over their divisional rivals and went into the playoffs for the first time. The first round of the playoffs saw a disappointing performance against a very strong London Olympians team with the team losing 48–0.

The 2011 season saw new additions to Division 2 South West with the South Wales Warriors being added from Division 1 and Bristol Apache and Bournemouth Bobcats being new into the league. The Renegades built on the previous season's progress and finished the regular season by winning the Conference Title with a record of 9–1. Hosting Shropshire Revolution in the first round of the playoffs saw the Berkshire team lose 2–14.

The 2012 season saw new competition and new opponents for the team as they were promoted at the conclusion of the 2011 season. The season started with a close 13–7 victory over Hampshire Thrashers before the team hosted Cambridgeshire Cats with a dominating victory 23–7. South Wales Warriors made the journey to Reading and came away with a narrow loss 22–20. The Renegades first loss of the season came at the hands of East Kent Mavericks 35–25. The team bounced back with road wins against Cambridgeshire Cats (18–13) and Kent Exiles (30–13) before a narrow loss to Sussex Thunder (27–22). After the tough game against the Thunder, the team had two back to back shut outs and dominated the Essex Spartans 81–0 and Kent Exiles 25–0 before losing to East Kent Mavericks 28–18. The regular season ended for the Renegades with a 7–3 record, setting the team up to host Nottingham Caesars in the first round of the playoffs. The visitors were firmly beaten 39–7 giving the Renegades their first playoff victory and a long road trip to West Coast Trojans. The Trojans proved to be a much more dominant opposition and beat the Renegades 43–6.

The Berkshire Renegades pulled out of BAFANL competition in 2015. following a 3–5 season. The team look to re-join in 2016 and begin by playing an associate friendly match at home against King's Lynn Patriots on Sunday 20 September 2015

In 2016 the Berkshire Renegades returned to the BAFANL in the SFC-2, with a successful season back in the league resulting in a 9–2 record. The team went to the playoffs but were knocked out after losing to the Cambridgeshire Cats.

In 2017 the Berkshire Renegades took home their first ever silverware, winning the SFC-2 Championship after beating Wembley Stallions 20–17 in the Britbowl XXXI Division 2 Southern Final after a 9–1 regular season and a playoff run that involved wins against the East Kent Mavericks and Bristol Apache.

In 2024, The Berkshire Renegades finished 4-4 in the Division 2, Making the Playoffs, going on the road to face Colchester Gladiators in the Quarter Final, losing 41-0. However they would end up being promoted to SFC Division 1 Central.

=== Team season records ===
Season	Division	W	L	T	PF	PA
1985	UKAFA Eastern	3	5	0	-	-
1986	Budweiser League, Division One Central	6	4	0	248	216
1987	Budweiser League Premier Division Central	0	9	1	32	373
1989	CGL, First Division South	3	3	0	124	76
1990	BNGL, First Division South	1	9	0	60	161
2006	BAFL Division Two West	0	10	0	31	312
2007	BAFL Division Two South West	2	8	0	80	305
2008	BAFL Division Two South West	1	8	1	88	283
2009	BAFL Division Two South West	3	7	0	142	289
2010	BAFACL Division Two South West	6	4	0	198	102
2011	BAFACL Division Two South West	9	1	0	262	114
2012	BAFANL Division One Central & South	8	4	0	322	200
2016	BAFANL Division Two South	9	2	0	-	-
2017	BAFANL Division Two South	9	1	0	-	-
2019	BAFANL Division One West	1	9	0	130	329
2022	BAFANL Division Two South	5	3	0	100	52
2023	BAFANL Division Two Central	3	5	0	86	126
2024	BAFANL Division Two West	4	4	0	89	108
2025	BAFANL Division One Central	1	7	0	19	254
(*) - Ongoing Season

=== Youth ===
The Berkshire Renegades also have a U16 & U19 Contact Team, alongside U11, U14 and U17 Flag Teams. Ranging from ages 7–17
