= South Wales Warriors =

American Football team based in the United Kingdom

General information
- Founded: 2001; 25 years ago
- Stadium: The Dairy Field
- Headquartered: Llanharan, Wales

Personnel
- General manager: David Coles
- Head coach: Jacob Law

League / conference affiliations
- BAFA National Leagues; BAFANL SFC 1 West

Championships
- League championships: 0 Two (2011, 2019)
- Division championships: 0 Four (2007, 2008, 2018, 2019)

Current uniform
Home kit

Away kit

Alternate kit

The South Wales Warriors are a British American football team based in Llanharan, Mid Glamorgan, Wales. They play in SFC 1 West for the 2022 season. The team was formed in 2001 after the Tiger Bay Warriors had disbanded due to the departure of head coach Rob Mota, along with key staff and players, by the remaining players and staff; the staff used equipment, resources and shirts from the folded Tiger Bay Warriors for economical purposes.

They play their home games at the home of Llanharan rugby club. In the 2008 season the South Wales Warriors won their conference with a record of 9 wins and 1 loss before losing their playoff quarter-final to the Cambridgeshire Cats. However, they were promoted following the reorganisation of the BAFL for the 2009 season. They were relegated to Division 2 West during the 2010 BAFA Community League restructure.

In 2011, the Warriors finished the regular season as runners up in the Division 2 West and finished fifth seed in Division 2 enabling them to enter the playoffs, eventually winning promotion and Division 2 Championship on 25 September at the Britbowl Championships held at the Crystal Palace National Sports Centre.

In 2012, the Warriors finished the Season with a record of 6 wins and 4 losses leaving them out of the playoffs and 4th in the Division 1 South and Central Division.

After being promoted to the BAFANL Premier South during the 2012/2013 league restructure, they played various teams from the southern half of the UK and primarily the 3 major London teams, London Warriors, London Blitz and London Olympians. After the end of the 2013 season, the club suffered heavily from the loss of key players to their Premier South rivals Bristol Aztecs across the border in England. This included Britball MVP Quarterback Gareth Thomas and wide receiver Benny Sherwood. The Warriors played through the following 3 seasons in the Premier South, culminating in their best Premier South record of 3 wins, 1 tie and 5 losses in 2016.

For the 2017 season, BAFA and the Warriors had taken the mutual decision to be demoted to the SFC 1 Central division after retirements and injuries to several veteran Warriors. For this they are unable to progress to the Post Season finals of SFC 1 Central for the 2017 and 2018 Season, and therefore be promoted to the Premier South division.

== History ==
=== South Wales Warriors (2001 to 2010) ===
In 2001, the team was formed as the South Wales Warriors and were admitted into the British Senior League to compete in Division Two South. After a year out of action, they found the going tougher and finished with a 2–5–1 record. The following two seasons repeated this pattern, with the Warriors finishing with 3–6 and 5–5 records in 2002 and 2003 respectively. However, 2004 saw a vast improvement and they finished second in their group with a 7–2–1 record, making the playoffs for the first time since reforming. Unfortunately, they were knocked out at the first stage, losing their quarter-final 6–30 to the Chiltern Cheetahs.

This feat was repeated in 2005, finishing the regular season in second place before losing their playoff quarter-final. In 2006, the Warriors once again finished in second place, clinching their spot on the last match day of the regular season with a 27–21 win away to the Andover Thrashers. They were drawn at home to the Essex Spartans for their wildcard playoff. The Warriors posted an impressive win, however, the visitors complained to the BAFL that the pitch at Bedwas RFC was too short, and therefore did not comply with league rules. After consultations between the two teams, the game was played as normal but the BAFL decided afterwards that the Warriors would forfeit the game, and therefore the game was awarded to the Spartans as a 1–0 victory.

The 2007 season saw the Warriors get over their play-off disappointment by winning their group with a near-perfect 9–1 record to win their second ever conference championship. A 13–7 quarter-final win against the Cambridgeshire Cats set up a semi-final tie away to the Norwich Devils, who came into this game on the back of a perfect 10–0 regular season and a quarter-final win against the Cornish Sharks. Unfortunately for the Warriors they were unable to beat an impressive home team, going down 28–43.

=== South Wales Warriors (2011) ===
The 2011 Season saw the Warriors compete in the reformed BAFA National Leagues. The opening game of the season saw them take on the Gloucester Banshees and win 46–0, one of four shut out games that season, which were to set the tone of the Warriors season. Eight wins and two defeats to the hands of the Berkshire Renegades resulted in the team finishing runners up in the Division 2 West league and entering the playoffs as wild card fifth seed. The quarter finals against the Kent Exiles resulted with a 33–13 Warriors victory . The Warriors then moved on to the semi-finals at the home ground of the Lancashire Wolverines in Blackburn. The Wolverines were soundly beaten 32–17, leading to a South Wales Warriors and West Coast Trojans Britbowl final at Crystal Palace and promotions to Division 1 for both teams. The Division 2 Britbowl final was played on 25 September 2011 at the Crystal Palace Stadium, London, with the final result of 48–20 to the Warriors crowning them Britbowl XXV BAFANL Division 2 Champions.

=== South Wales Warriors (2012) ===
2012 saw the newly promoted Warriors to Division 1 South and Central play a condensed season of football (10 Games over 13 weeks). The warriors had a mixed result to the season, winning six games and losing four. The Warriors home game to Essex Spartans was postponed from 16 June to 15 July due to adverse weather conditions affecting large parts of mainland Britain at the time, the subsequent game was forfeited after Essex were unable to field a team. The Warriors managed to keep a 100% home record for the season which left them finishing in fourth place within the division.

On 23 September it was announced that the South Wales Warriors were to be promoted to the Premiership South Division after an expansion programme run by BAFA.

=== South Wales Warriors (2013) ===
2013 saw the newly promoted Warriors in the expanded Premiership South Conference and played a season of 10 games from end of April till the end of August. The Warriors played each club in the Conference once give a total of 5 away games and 5 home games. The Warriors started the season at home to Peterborough Saxons, which ended in a narrow loss and ended the season on the road to London Olympians, which again was a narrow loss. The Warriors finished 9th in the division and started to get ready for their second season in the Premiership South Conference.

=== South Wales Warriors (2014) ===
2014 saw the Warriors again in the Premiership South Conference and played a season of 8 games from end of April till the end of August (8 as Sussex Thunder pulled out before the season began.) The Warriors played each club in the Conference once – a total of 4 away games and 4 home games. The Warriors started the season at home to Colchester Gladiators, which ended in a victory and ended the season at home to the London Olympians, which was a narrow loss. The Warriors finished 6th in the division with a 3–5 record, with victories in the home games against Colchester Gladiators, East Kent Mavericks and Cambridgeshire Cats, and defeats against Bristol Aztecs, London Blitz, London Warriors, London Olympians and Berkshire Renegades.

== Senior team season records ==
=== Summary ===
Season	Division	P	W	L	T	PF	PA	Final position	Playoff record	Notes
2001	BAFL Division 2 South	8	2	5	1	66	104	7 / 9	—	First season competing
2002	BSL Division 2 South	9	3	6	0	258	128	7 / 19	—	—
2003	BSL Division 2 South West	10	5	5	0	158	172	4 / 6	—	—
2004	BSL Division 2 South West	10	7	2	1	228	129	2 / 6	Lost 6–30 to Chiltern Cheetahs in quarter-final.	—
2005	BAFL Division 2 South West	10	8	2	0	298	71	2 / 6	Lost 16–30 to Kent Exiles in quarter-final.	—
2006	BAFL Division 2 West	10	7	3	0	285	93	2 / 5	Defeated Essex Spartans in wild card playoff.	Forfeited the game against Essex Spartans on 80 yard pitch technicality.
2007	BAFL Division 2 South West	10	9	1	0	255	91	1 / 5	Beat Cambridgeshire Cats 13–7 in quarter-final. Lost 28–43 to Norwich Devils in semi-final.	Conference champions
2008	BAFL Division 2 South West	10	9	1	0	255	59	1 / 5	Beat Colchester Gladiators 21–12 in wild-card playoff. Lost 7–21 to Cambridgeshire Cats in quarter-final.	Conference champions. Regular season record includes one win by forfeit. Promoted to Division One.
2009	BAFL Division 1 South West	10	6	4	0	194	86	3 / 5	—	—
2010	BAFACL Division 1 South West	10	4	6	0	?	?	? / ?	—	Relegated to Division 2 West
2011	BAFANL Division 2 West	10	8	2	0	317	66	2 / 6	Beat Kent Exiles 33–13 in quarter finals playoff. Beat the Lancashire Wolverines 32–17 in semi finals playoff. Beat the West Coast Trojans 48–20 to win Division 2 Britbowl Final at Crystal Palace.	Finished Western Conference as runners up to Berkshire Renegades. Britbowl XXV BAFANL Division 2 Champions. Promoted to Division 1 South and Central
2012	BAFANL Division 1 South and Central	10	6	4	0	270	192	4 / 8	—	Promoted to Premiership South through Premiership Expansion Programme
2013	BAFANL Premiership South	10	2	8	0	93	302	9 / 11	—	—
2014	BAFANL Premiership South	8	3	5	0	58	244	6 / 9	—	—
2015	BAFANL Premiership South	8	0	8	0	41	331	5 / 5	—	—
2016	BAFANL Premiership South	10	3	6	1	150	347	5 / 6	—	Demoted to BAFANL SFC 1 Central under mutual agreement during the 2017 league restructure.
2017	BAFANL SFC 1 Central	10	0	10	0	56	196	5 / 5	—	Demoted to BAFANL SFC 2 West.
2018	BAFANL SFC 2 West	8	8	0	0	310	12	1 / 6	Beat Worcestershire Black Knights 1–0 in Quarter-finals. Black Knights forfeit game due to player levels. Lost 37–12 to Portsmouth Dreadnoughts in Semi-finals.	BAFANL SFC 2 West Conference Champions
2019	BAFANL SFC 2 West	8	8	0	0	298	54	1 / 6	Beat Bristol Apache 28–3 in Quarter-final. Beat London Blitz B 16–6 in Semi-finals. Beat Bournemouth Bobcats 13-0 in Final.	Britbowl XXXIII BAFANL SFC 2 Champions; SFC 2 West Conference Champions; Promoted to Division 1
2020	BAFANL SFC 1 Central	–	–	–	–	–	–	– / –	—	League Season cancelled Due To COVID-19 Outbreak.
2021	BAFANL Severn Division	6	3	3	0	54	96	2 / 6	—	Localised League Season Due To COVID-19.
2022	BAFANL SFC 1 West	10	3	6	1	101	134	4 / 6	—	—
2023	BAFANL SFC 1 West	10	3	7	0	96	151	5 / 6	—	—
2024	BAFANL SFC 1 West	8	6	2	0	137	56	2 / 5	Beat London Olympians 13-0 in Wild Card. Lost to Rushmoor Knights 11-34 in Quarter-finals.	—
2025	BAFANL SFC 1 West	8	6	2	–	125	74	2 / 5	Lost to London Olympians 0-18 in Quarter-finals	—

=== 2011 results ===
Date	Fixture	Result	Notes
24 April 2011	WARRIORS @ Gloucester Banshees	46–0	—
7 May 2011	Bristol Apache @ WARRIORS	0–34	—
28 May 2011	Cornish Sharks @ WARRIORS	8–42	—
5 June 2011	WARRIORS @ Berkshire Renegades	6–9	—
19 June 2011	Gloucester Banshees @ WARRIORS	14–46	—
26 June 2011	Berkshire Renegades @ WARRIORS	19–14	—
9 July 2011	WARRIORS @ Bristol Apache	54–8	—
16 July 2011	Bournemouth Bobcats @ WARRIORS	0–34	—
23 July 2011	WARRIORS @ Cornish Sharks	22–0	—
6 August 2011	WARRIORS @ Bournemouth Bobcats	19–8	—
29 August 2011	WARRIORS @ Kent Exiles	33–13	Wild card playoff
5 September 2011	WARRIORS @ Lancashire Wolverines	32–17	Playoff semi final
25 September 2011	WARRIORS @ West Coast Trojans	48–20	Britbowl Playoff final at Crystal Palace

=== 2012 results ===
Date	Fixture	Result	Notes
28 April 2012	Hampshire Thrashers @ WARRIORS	18–34	—
6 May 2012	WARRIORS @ Berkshire Renegades	20–22	—
26 May 2012	Kent Exiles @ WARRIORS	12–56	—
2 June 2012	WARRIORS @ Sussex Thunder	13–28	—
10 June 2012	WARRIORS @ Hampshire Thrashers	42–13	—
16 June 2012	Essex Spartans @ WARRIORS	P–P	Postponed due to adverse weather conditions
23 June 2012	WARRIORS @ Cambridgeshire Cats	36–44	—
7 July 2012	East Kent Mavericks @ WARRIORS	12–18	—
14 July 2012	WARRIORS @ East Kent Mavericks	15–17	—
15 July 2012	Essex Spartans @ WARRIORS	0–1	Essex forfeited
28 July 2012	Sussex Thunder @ WARRIORS	26–35	—

=== 2013 results ===
Date	Fixture	Result	Notes
28 April 2013	Peterborough Saxons @ WARRIORS	13–8	—
4 May 2013	WARRIORS @ East Kent Mavericks	26–35	—
25 May 2013	WARRIORS @ Sussex Thunder	0–20	—
9 June 2013	London Warriors @ WARRIORS	56–0	—
22 June 2013	WARRIORS @ Cambridgeshire Cats	14–30	—
30 June 2013	Bristol Aztecs @ WARRIORS	41–0	—
14 July 2013	Ipswich Cardinals @ WARRIORS	7–12	—
3 August 2013	WARRIORS @ London Blitz	0–69	—
10 August 2013	Berkshire Renegades @ WARRIORS	18–33	—
25 August 2013	WARRIORS @ London Olympians	0–13	—

=== 2014 results ===
Date	Fixture	Result	Notes
27 April 2014	WARRIORS @ London Blitz	0–43	—
4 May 2014	Colchester Gladiators @ WARRIORS	12–14	—
11 May 2014	WARRIORS @ Bristol Aztecs	0–52	—
25 May 2014	WARRIORS @ Berkshire Renegades	6–7	—
8 June 2014	East Kent Mavericks @ WARRIORS	14–17	—
29 June 2014	Cambridgeshire Cats @ WARRIORS	20–21	—
20 July 2014	WARRIORS @ London Warriors	0–70	—
10 August 2014	London Olympians @ WARRIORS	26–0	—

=== 2015 results ===
Date	Fixture	Result	Notes
26 April 2015	WARRIORS @ Bristol Aztecs	7–35	—
10 May 2015	WARRIORS @ London Olympians	10–27	—
24 May 2015	London Warriors @ WARRIORS	49–0	—
7 June 2015	London Olympians @ WARRIORS	22–18	—
14 June 2015	Bristol Aztecs @ WARRIORS	49–0	—
28 June 2015	London Blitz @ WARRIORS	59–6	—
18 July 2015	WARRIORS @ London Blitz	0–49	—
26 July 2015	WARRIORS @ London Warriors	0–41	—

=== 2016 results ===
Date	Fixture	Result	Notes
17 April 2016	WARRIORS @ London Warriors	0–71	—
1 May 2016	WARRIORS @ London Olympians	35–18	—
8 May 2016	WARRIORS @ London Blitz	6–27	—
22 May 2016	WARRIORS @ Bristol Aztecs	27–27	—
5 June 2016	Farnham Knights @ WARRIORS	28–30	—
12 June 2016	London Olympians @ WARRIORS	13–20	—
26 June 2016	London Warriors @ WARRIORS	35–0	—
10 July 2016	London Blitz @ WARRIORS	48–0	—
17 July 2016	WARRIORS @ Farnham Knights	14–32	—
31 July 2016	Bristol Aztecs @ WARRIORS	48–18	—

=== 2017 results ===
Date	Fixture	Result	Notes
9 April 2017	Ouse Valley Eagles @ WARRIORS	14–12	—
23 April 2017	Oxford Saints @ WARRIORS	13–6	—
30 April 2017	Sussex Thunder @ WARRIORS	14–8	—
7 May 2017	WARRIORS @ Solent Thrashers	0–20	—
13 May 2017	WARRIORS @ Sussex Thunder	6–17	—
11 June 2017	WARRIORS @ Ouse Valley Eagles	0–3	—
18 June 2017	WARRIORS @ Solent Thrashers	8–15	—
25 June 2017	WARRIORS @ Oxford Saints	0–42	—
8 July 2017	Sussex Thunder @ WARRIORS	17–0	—
30 July 2017	Solent Thrashers @ WARRIORS	41–16	—

=== 2018 results ===
Date	Fixture	Result	Notes
5 April 2018	WARRIORS @ Somerset Wyverns	8–6	—
6 May 2018	Jurassic Coast Raptors @ WARRIORS	0–50	—
13 May 2018	Cornish Sharks @ WARRIORS	-–-	Postponed due to Cornish Sharks player levels. Rearranged for 24 June 2018.
17 June 2018	WARRIORS @ Worcestershire Black Knights	48–0	—
24 June 2018	Cornish Sharks @ WARRIORS	0–64	—
1 July 2018	Worcestershire Black Knights @ WARRIORS	0–48	—
8 July 2018	WARRIORS @ Torbay Trojans	14–6	—
22 July 2018	Torbay Trojans @ WARRIORS	0–42	Warriors crowned SFC2 West Champions.
5 August 2018	WARRIORS @ Cornish Sharks	36–0	—
11 August 2018	Worcestershire Black Knights @ WARRIORS	0–1	Playoff Quarter-finals – Worcestershire Black Knights Forfeit
18 August 2018	Portsmouth Dreadnoughts @ WARRIORS	37–12	Playoff Semi-finals

=== 2019 results ===
Date	Fixture	Result	Notes
28 April 2019	WARRIORS @ Cornish Sharks	33–0	—
12 May 2019	Worcestershire Black Knights @ WARRIORS	0–55	—
19 May 2019	WARRIORS @ Bristol Apache	46–21	—
2 June 2019	Somerset Wyverns @ WARRIORS	6–29	—
9 June 2019	WARRIORS @ Somerset Wyverns	26–7	—
23 June 2019	WARRIORS @ Torbay Trojans	49–14	—
7 July 2019	Torbay Trojans @ WARRIORS	6–10	—
4 August 2019	Cornish Sharks @ WARRIORS	0–51	—
11 August 2019	Bristol Apache @ WARRIORS	3–28	Quarter-finals
18 August 2019	London Blitz B @ WARRIORS	6–16	Semi-finals
31 August 2019	Bournemouth Bobcats @ WARRIORS	0–13	Britbowl Playoff final at New River Stadium, London

=== 2021 results ===
Date	Fixture	Result	Notes
25 July 2021	WARRIORS @ Worcestershire Black Knights	28–0	—
8 August 2021	WARRIORS @ Birmingham Bulls	14–18	—
15 August 2021	Swindon Storm @ WARRIORS	0–12	—
22 August 2021	Hereford Stampede @ WARRIORS	P–P	Hereford informed SWW that they couldn't fulfil fixture
5 September 2021	WARRIORS @ Hereford Stampede	22–12	—
12 September 2021	Bristol Aztecs @ WARRIORS	36–0	Played at Filton SGS – Wise Campus
19 September 2021	Worcestershire Black Knights @ WARRIORS	P–P	WBK informed SWW that they couldn't fulfil fixture
3 October 2021	WARRIORS @ Bristol Aztecs	0–20	—

=== 2022 results ===
Date	Fixture	Result	Notes
10 April 2022	Hertfordshire Cheetahs @ WARRIORS	13–7	—
17 April 2022	Rushmoor Knights @ WARRIORS	43–20	—
24 April 2022	WARRIORS @ Oxford Saints	7–7	—
15 May 2022	WARRIORS @ Bournemouth Bobcats	5–12	—
22 May 2022	Oxford Saints @ WARRIORS	2–31	—
19 June 2022	Portsmouth Dreadnoughts @ WARRIORS	0–13	—
26 June 2022	Bournemouth Bobcats @ WARRIORS	6–12	—
3 July 2022	WARRIORS @ Hertfordshire Cheetahs	6–15	—
24 July 2022	WARRIORS @ Rushmoor Knights	0–33	—
31 July 2022	WARRIORS @ Portsmouth Dreadnoughts	0–3	—

=== 2023 results ===
Date	Fixture	Result	Notes
30 April 2023	WARRIORS @ Bournemouth Bobcats	13–7	—
7 May 2023	Hertfordshire Cheetahs @ WARRIORS	29–0	—
14 May 2023	Rushmoor Knights @ WARRIORS	21–14	—
28 May 2023	WARRIORS @ Oxford Saints	0–3	—
4 June 2023	Bournemouth Bobcats @ WARRIORS	16–14	—
11 June 2023	WARRIORS @ Rushmoor Knights	14–23	—
25 June 2023	Oxford Saints @ WARRIORS	2–25	—
2 July 2023	Bristol Apache @ WARRIORS	0–3	—
23 July 2023	WARRIORS @ Hertfordshire Cheetahs	7–30	—
6 August 2023	WARRIORS @ Bristol Apache	6–20	—

=== 2024 results ===
Date	Fixture	Result	Notes
14 April 2024	WARRIORS @ Bournemouth Bobcats	19-8	—
21 April 2024	WARRIORS @ Somerset Wyverns	0-26	—
5 May 2024	WARRIORS v Bournemouth Bobcats	16-0	—
12 May 2024	WARRIORS v Bristol Apache	6-7	—
26 May 2024	WARRIORS v Somerset Wyverns	17-0	—
2 June 2024	WARRIORS @ Hereford Stampede	31-9	—
23 June 2024	WARRIORS @ Bristol Apache	7-6	—
30 June 2024	WARRIORS v Hereford Stampede	41-0	—
4 August 24	WARRIORS v London Olympians	13-0	Wild Card Round
11 August 2024	WARRIORS @ Rushmoor Knights	11-34	Quarter-finals

=== 2025 results ===
Date	Fixture	Result	Notes
20 April 2025	WARRIORS v Bournemouth Bobcats	8-0	—
27 April 2025	WARRIORS @ Somerset Wyverns	39–0	—
4 May 2025	WARRIORS v Solent Thrashers	18-17	Played at Llanrumney Playing Fields
18 May 2025	WARRIORS v Bristol Apache	9-7	—
25 May 2025	WARRIORS v Somerset Wyverns	38-0	—
15 June 2025	WARRIORS @ Bournemouth Bobcats	6-3	—
22 June 2025	WARRIORS @ Bristol Apache	0-14	—
20 July 2025	WARRIORS @ Solent Thrashers	7-33	—
27 July 2025	WARRIORS @ London Olympians	0-18	Quarter-finals

=== 2026 results ===
Date	Fixture	Result	Notes
19 April 2026	WARRIORS v Bournemouth Bobcats	26-0	—
3 May 2025	WARRIORS v Hereford Stampede	41–7	—
10 May 2025	WARRIORS @ Hereford Stampede	28-12	—
17 May 2025	WARRIORS v Solent Thrashers	20-41	—
31 May 2026	WARRIORS @ Bournemouth Bobcats	17-6	—
14 June 2026	WARRIORS v Bristol Apache	-	—
28 June 2026	WARRIORS @ Bristol Apache	-	—
19 July 2026	WARRIORS @ Solent Thrashers	-	

== Game venue and training ==
The home of the South Wales Warriors from 2009 has been the Dairy Field, home of Llanharan RFC, which is situated around half an hour north west of Cardiff. The ground was purchased by the rugby club in 1989. A 440-seat stand was built shortly afterwards, with a bank of covered terracing built on the opposite side two years later and a new clubhouse was built in 2002 on the site of the local British Legion Club. It is one of only three American football venues in the United Kingdom to use a referee's microphone. The team also use Roath Park Recreational Ground for informal training sessions.

For the 2008 season, the Warriors played their home games at Sully Sports & Leisure Centre, located in the village of Sully, just outside Barry. They shared this ground with a number of local sports teams including Sully rugby club and a baseball club. For the 2006 and 2007 seasons, the Warriors played their home matches at the Bridge Field, located in Bedwas, Caerphilly, which they shared with Bedwas rugby club.

Before this, the team were based in Cardiff with most of their games played at Canton rugby club, and a few games also being played at Llanrumney Leisure Centre and Roath Park Recreational Ground. While Llanharan RFC play on the Dairyfield toward the end of the UK Rugby season, the Warriors train on 3G Astroturf at Y Pant Comprehensive School, Pontyclun during winter months and the Llanharan Welfare Ground during the Spring Months.
