= Gloucester Centurions =

Former American Football team based in the United Kingdom (2007–2015)

- Established: 2007
- Folded: 2015
- Based in: Gloucester
- Home stadium: Sir Thomas Rich's School, Gloucester
- League: BAFA National Leagues
- Division: National South
- Colours: Purple and Black

The Gloucester Centurions were an American football team based in Gloucester. They competed in the National South League of the BAFA National Leagues.

== History ==
=== 1985–1993 ===
American football has been played in Gloucester since its début in the United Kingdom. The first league team to play in the area was the Gloucester Boars, who played in the 1985 United Kingdom American Football Association. The team progressed to the Budweiser League and played as the Cotswold Bears during 1986 and 1987. They won the SW conference; on the way they played at Kingsholm Stadium, (the home of Gloucester Rugby) against the Cardiff Tigers in front of a crowd of 3000.

The Bears folded at the end of the 1987 season. A new team was set up at Plock Court, Gloucester, playing under the name of the Severn Vale Royals. The Royals took part in the British National Gridiron League during the 1989 to 1993 seasons, reaching a Bowl Final in their rookie year, but losing out to their bitter rivals, the Cheltenham Chieftains. The Severn Vale Royals closed at the end of the 1993 season, and the team was replaced the following year by the West Country Phoenix. But less than a year later, the Phoenix disappeared. Several youth teams emerged during the mid-1990s, but without any real success. However, in 2007, American football returned to Gloucester.

=== 2007–2008 ===
In early 2007, a team called the Gloucester Banshees set up in the city of Gloucester. Many of the Banshees staff were involved in previous teams, such as the Severn Vale Royals, West Country Phoenix, Cheltenham Chieftains, Cotswold Bears and the Gloucester Boars. After a 10-month feasibility study (to see if the interest was still there for American football), training began in early February 2008. The Banshees' first fully kitted game was with Premiership "giants" Bristol Aztecs. This game was a one-sided affair with the Aztecs posting 50 points without reply. But, the Banshees were soon to taste their first win, when they beat a full-strength Reading Renegades. A late-season game with Division One Oxford Saints ended with victory going to the Saints but the Banshees had successfully completed their Associate campaign and awaited the deliberations of the assessor from League HQ.

Going on the strength of superb facilities that included a full-sized 100-yard playing field, the British American Football League promoted the Banshees to full league membership in November 2008. The Banshees drafted players from the now-defunct Hereford Chargers in preparation for their first season as full members of the British American Football League.

=== 2009 ===
The Banshees were placed into Division 2 Southwest conference and scheduled to meet the Cornish Sharks, Berkshire Renegades, Plymouth Admirals, Hampshire Thrashers on a home and away basis with 2 cross conference games, home to the Shropshire Revolution and away to the Staffordshire Surge to make up the 10 games season. Head Coach Maurice Myers lead a squad consisting mainly of rookies supplemented by American quarterback Derek Yenerall to an impressive 3–1–6 (W-T-L) record in their first full league season, highlights including an early season 21-all draw at conference favourites Hampshire Thrashers and a win at Plymouth Admirals.

=== 2010 ===
With Coach Myers still at the helm the Banshees approached the season with confidence that they could improve upon the previous year, however, the early season loss of American quarterback Yenerall and dominant nose tackle Marcus Campbell to the nearby Premiership giants Bristol Aztecs was a major setback. The Banshees did manage an impressive 34–0 victory over the Cornish Sharks early on but that was to be the only highlight of the season as after that the loss of key offensive linemen Iain Vanes (career ending knee injury) and Karl Friston (joined Bristol Aztecs) decimated the offence even further. Despite creditable performances away to Watford Cheetahs and Milton Keynes Pathfinders the Banshees ended the season with a 1–9 (W-L) record.

=== 2011 ===
At the start of the 2011 season, the club members elected a new committee at the annual AGM. Three games into the season both the head coach and administrator resigned due to an internal dispute with regards to player selection. The Banshees appointed Colin Branagh to fulfill the vacant head coach position. A tough schedule including perennial title favourites Cornish Sharks, Berkshire Renegades, Bournemouth Bobcats, Bristol Apache and Welsh powerhouse South Wales Warriors saw the Banshees finish the season with an 0–1–9 (W-T-L) record.

Shortly after the end of the season, head coach Branagh tendered his resignation and subsequently took up the general manager's role at Leicester Falcons. As part of an entire club restructure a submission for renaming the team was made to and accepted by BAFANL, and from 2012 onwards the team has been called Gloucester Centurions.

=== 2012 ===
The 2012 season saw the Centurions scheduled against Oxford Saints, Bournemouth Bobcats, Cornish Sharks and Bristol Apache. They ended the season with two wins, six losses and two draws.

== Team colours ==
The Gloucester Centurions play in a purple home kit with silver trim and their alternative is the old Banshees second strip (white with red trims).

== Media ==
The Banshees were featured on BBC Radio Gloucestershire and The West Country Tonight.
