= Hertfordshire Cheetahs =

American football team based in the United Kingdom

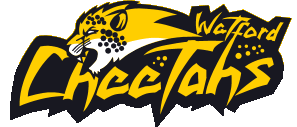
- First season: 1986; 40 years ago
- Stadium: Sunsport & Postal Club, Bellmount Wood Avenue, Watford, WD17 3BN (capacity: Open Field)
- Location: Watford
- League: BAFANL
- Conference: National League South Central
- Division: East
- All-time record: 106–158–5 (.403)
- Bowl record: 0–3–0 (.000)

Claimed national championships
- 0

Conference championships
- 2

Conference division championships
- 0

Current uniform
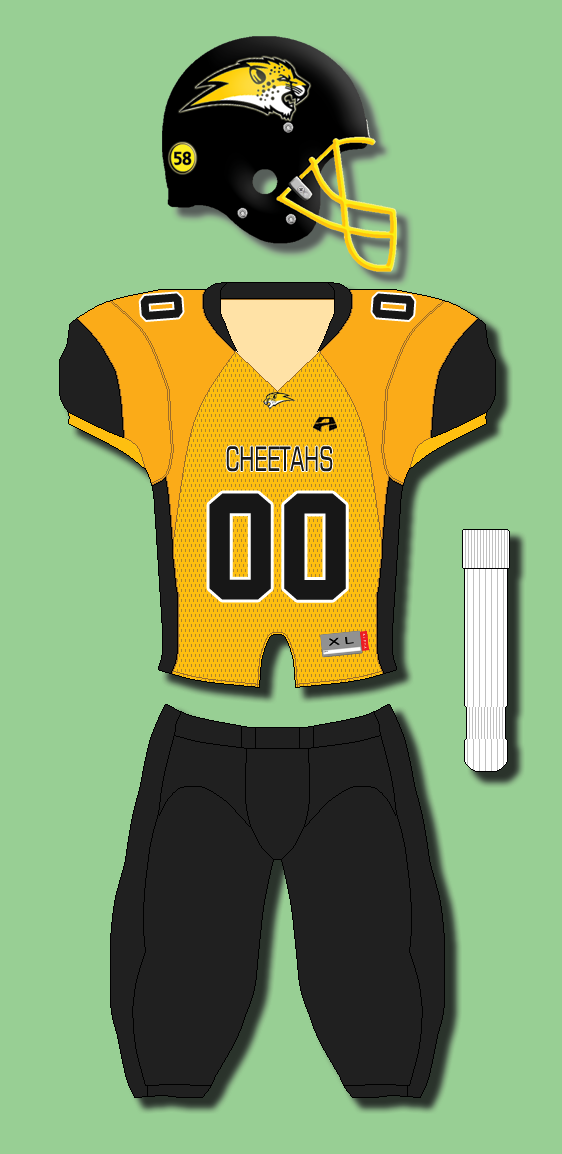
- Colors: University Gold and Black
- Website: Hertfordshire Cheetahs

The Hertfordshire Cheetahs (formerly the Watford Cheetahs and Chiltern Cheetahs) are an American football team based in Watford, including a senior kitted team (contact) competing in the BAFA National Leagues (BAFANL), Under 16 and under 19 kitted teams (contact) a women's kitted (formally the Hertfordshire Tornadoes) team and The Hertfordshire Cheetahs Flag Football 11U, 14U, and 17U Flag football (non-contact) teams playing in the BAFA Youth Flag Football League. Currently all teams train and host their home games at Sun Postal Sports & Social Club, Bellmount Wood Avenue, Watford, WD17 3BN. The senior team was first formed in 1986 and entered a senior competition the following year, making them the third-longest continuously competing team in the United Kingdom behind only the Birmingham Bulls and Glasgow Tigers. During their history, the Cheetahs have reached the Divisional Playoff final on five occasions: in 1997, 2004, 2005, 2018 and 2023.The 2018 final was their first championship victory beating the Portsmouth Dreadnoughts for division 2 honours. After winning the Thames Valley div 2021 SFC1 West 2022 the Cheetahs won it all in 2023 SFC1 West Div and Southern Conference and finally took National honours against the Northumberland Vikings in over time. After a 13-0 season they earned promotion to the Premier league in 2024

== History ==
=== Early years (1986–1989) ===
The Chiltern Cheetahs were formed in the summer of 1986 by a group of friends based in Amersham, Buckinghamshire. With some outside help, the team developed and they played their first friendly on 30 November 1986—a 0–9 defeat to the St Albans Kestrels played at the home of Chesham United football club in front of 1800 spectators. A further three pre-season matches were played after the New Year; an 18–6 win against the F14 Tomcats, a 41–2 win against the Bristol Blackhawks, and a 34–9 win against the Chiltern Panthers. After these pre-season successes, they entered league competition in the summer of 1987, competing in the Capital League's County Division. They finished with a record of seven wins and three defeats, narrowly missing out on the playoffs.

The Cheetahs moved to the British National Gridiron League the following year, but were affected by the loss of their two American coaches. Despite one team in their division being banned from competition and two teams pulling out before the season began, the Cheetahs struggled throughout and lost all six of their games. They performed slightly better in 1989 despite losing more players, winning three out of their ten games.

==== 1990–1995 ====
The following season, the Cheetahs were moved to the Southern Conference of the BNGL's Premier Division, but they struggled once again, finishing bottom of the four-team group with just two wins out of ten.

This resulted in the Cheetahs being relegated to Division One, where they were assigned to the East Midlands Conference. They moved home once again, playing their games at Newlands Park College in Chalfont St. Giles. They began the season with two ties away from home, before narrowly losing their first home game against the Stratford Tempests due to a last minute field goal. Two further defeats were followed by three successive victories, with the Cheetahs eventually finishing fourth in the group. 1992 saw them winning six of their games, again narrowly missing out on a playoff spot.

Their first real success came in 1993. After appointing a pair of new coaches, the team won all but one of their games to win the First Division South Central Conference, claiming their first ever conference title and qualifying for the playoffs. They were drawn at home to the Weymouth Renegades, whom they beat 15–8 with their three running backs each getting over 100 yards. In the quarter-final, they travelled to the Hereford Chargers—after conceding 22 points in the first quarter, they were unable to recover and ended up losing 15–22.

The following year, the Cheetahs switched over to the newly formed British American Football Association (BAFA) league. They were assigned to the Division 3 Midlands Conference, which also contained the Cambridge Cats, Colchester Gladiators and Norwich Devils, with their home games against the Gladiators and Devils being their only two wins that season. The following season also saw them struggle, with two of their three wins coming as the result of the London Mets forfeiting their games.

==== 1996–1997 ====
1996 saw the Chiltern Cheetahs celebrating their tenth anniversary with a friendly match against the visiting Hamlen Dragons—the Cheetahs defeated their German opponents 60–0. The team were moved to the newly formed British Senior League, where they played in the Division 3 Midlands Conference. Although they finished the season with five wins and five defeats, they recorded a number of individual records—quarterback Rob Suttling became the first Cheetahs player to pass for more than 1,000 yards in a season, and safety Jay Rayner recorded nine interceptions, the highest total in Division Three. The following year was one of their most successful. After a good start followed by three consecutive defeats, a run of five wins saw the Cheetahs finishing second in their group and qualifying for the playoffs for only the second time in their history. An away win against the Leicester Huntsmen was followed by a 26–16 home win over the Yorkshire Rams in the semi-final, a result secured by two interception touchdowns. The team then travelled to play the Division 2 playoff final at the Saffron Lane stadium in Leicester against the Bristol Aztecs, a team who had only conceded 32 points all season, with the Aztecs winning 6–27.

Compared with 1997, the next few seasons were unremarkable with The Cheetahs generally finishing in mid-table.

==== 2004–2005 ====
It wasn't until 2004 that they again experienced success, when they finished top of Division 2 South East with ten wins out of ten. This meant they finished at top seeds in the entire division, and so were assured of home draws. A 30–6 win over the South Wales Warriors in the quarter-final was followed by a 34–6 semi-final win over the Sussex Thunder. This set up their second playoff final, this time played at the Don Valley Stadium in Sheffield in front of 1440 spectators. They did not finish the season with another win, losing 16–32 to the Doncaster Mustangs.

Despite losing the final, the Cheetahs were promoted to Division 1A of the British American Football League. After winning their first match against the Southern Sundevils, they struggled at this higher level and only managed to win one more of their games, ultimately finishing third out of four teams in their group. This was still to gain a wild-card slot in the playoffs and they made the most of this opportunity, defeating the Staffordshire Surge and the London Blitz to gain a place in the final for the second successive season. As with their first playoff final eight years before, they played the Bristol Aztecs and lost only by a single touchdown.

==== 2006–2007 ====
They didn't recover from this and lost all ten games in the following season, only managing to score 32 points. They were therefore relegated back to Division 2, where they played the 2007 season in the South East Conference at their new home in Watford. They continued to struggle, winning only two of their ten games.

=== Watford Cheetahs (2008–2012) ===
In 2008, the team were renamed the Watford Cheetahs and were reassigned to the Eastern Conference, where they finished with a record of two wins, seven defeats and one draw.

==== 2010 ====
2010 was an eventful year for the Cheetahs. Drew Anderson was appointed as head coach, numerous adjustments and new arrivals made it a busy off season, including the Cheetahs being transferred to the BAFACL Division 2 West. The pre-season began with two scrimmage games v. London Blitz and Cambridgeshire Cats. They began the 2010 League campaign 3–0 with consecutive wins away from home including a 27–14 win against the Cornish Sharks. Three consecutive defeats then followed, twice against the Berkshire Renegades and an unfortunate defeat away to Hampshire Thrashers, which made the Cheetahs 3–3. Two thrilling come-from-behind home wins v. Gloucester Banshees and runaway divisional leaders Hampshire Thrashers, which gave the Cheetahs a chance of gong into the playoffs. A 35–13 loss at home to Milton Keynes City Pathfinders stopped any Cheetahs playoff chances and the season ended with another home defeat to Cornish Sharks. The Cheetahs finished the season 5–5 and 3rd position in the division.

==== 2011 ====
In 2011, the club celebrating their 25th anniversary, with more several comings and goings in the playing roster and coaching staff. Linebacker Jamie Brown was installed as the team's new defensive co-ordinator and a partnership on offense between retired kicker Douglas Andrews and quarterback Martin Brown, after the departure of previous coach Adrian Stemp. Brown became the team's new starting QB ahead of the established Paul Symonds, who took the opportunity of also playing wide receiver as well as quarterback after recovering from an arm injury sustained the season before. Backup quarterback Nik Maxey, who once played for the Great Britain Crusaders (Under 18) and Bulldogs (University) teams, would also take a more active coaching role as the 2011 season unfolded. Head coach Drew Anderson announced toward the end of the season that he would step down to become the head of BAFA's Community Football scheme.

Before the 2011 season kicked off, Cheetahs formed a partnership with the University of Hertfordshire Hurricanes team, culminating in two scrimmage games to help prepare the Hurricanes for their winter football season. So successful were the games that several players, led by former Cheetahs linebacker Richard Ward, also returned and he brought a few former Hurricanes players with him to play for the Cheetahs in the 2011 season.

The club also announced that they would form a Youth Kitted team with help from the local youth and community authority.

Before the season kicked off proper in April, the Cheetahs were transferred back to the Eastern Conference of BAFA's Community League to be reunited with their old rivals from Kent, Norwich, Bedfordshire, Essex and Milton Keynes, who themselves spent a season with the Cheetahs in the West Conference joined them back in the East.

The season began with the team away from home against the Bedfordshire Blue Raiders in which the Cheetahs shut out their Bedford-based rivals 15–0. Another shut-out in the following game, which would be the team's 25th Anniversary Game at home against Norwich Devils with the Cheetahs winning over the Devils 37–0. The Devils announced shortly after that they could not continue playing for the remainder of the season which meant the Cheetahs had an extra win under their belts, albeit by default. A history-making third shut-out in succession happened in the next game away in Kent against the Maidstone Pumas. The Cheetahs winning 61–0. This made the Cheetahs 4–0 for zero points conceded the Cheetahs' season.

The Cheetahs themselves would suffer a shut-out themselves in the following game away against the Kent Exiles. The Cheetahs, failing to move the ball effectively at a drizzle-soaked Crockenhill suffered an 18–0 loss in what was the Conference-topping game. A bruising 31–20 loss against a physical and much improved Milton Keynes City Pathfinders team pushed the team further out of the Playoff picture with the season record standing at 4–2.

The following game, the Cheetahs at home at a sweltering Fullerians (with temperatures well in the high 80s) against the table-topping Essex Spartans in which the Cheetahs ran out 19–6 winners. A defeat away at Milton Keynes by 20–16 would ultimately stop the Cheetahs' post-season Playoff hopes. The Cheetahs exacted revenge against the Exiles in the return-game at home by 23–14 which saw the game suspended temporarily in the 4th quarter by a brief thunderstorm. The final home game then saw the Cheetahs win over Bedfordshire by 43–6. The Cheetahs finished the 2011 season with their first winning season since their 10–0 season in 2004 with a record of 7 wins for 3 losses and 0 ties, and the fourth lowest points-conceded in the entire division.

=== Back to fighting form (2013–present) ===
After a dismal 2012 season that resulted in the cheetahs finishing 3–7, the pre season for the 2013 campaign saw a number of changes in cheetah personnel, committee and coaching staff, the cheetahs began recruiting players from all over Hertfordshire to strengthen their ranks. With the return of a few old faces to the team, this led to the Cheetahs managing a complete U-turn in their season, finishing 6–4, just narrowly missing out on the playoffs. With convincing wins over both Milton Keynes pathfinders and Kent exiles that season there was no doubt the Cheetahs were a serious team and ready to be contenders in the next season.

The 2014 season sees a return to dominance for the Cheetahs, despite the departure of offensive co-ordinator Coach Lowry, the Cheetahs were joined by Coach Brown taking over the defensive co-ordinator role and Coach Shu leading on the offensive front. With a change of venue to the University of Hertfordshire Sports Village, the Cheetahs had seen a boost in moral and were currently sitting at 5–0 and leaders of their conference.

2015 was a season with mixed fortunes for the Cheetahs. Huge offseason upheaval led by chairman at the time Al Tepper led to a new home ground at St Albans Rugby Club, which has given the club space and resources to grow, and to improve their game day facilities, helping them to launch a cheerleading squad and flag team. Growing numbers of younger players in the Senior squad has also led to one of their players, Stuart Butcher, representing the Great British Student Lions in their recent victory over their Finnish counterparts. Early season results included a narrow loss (14–12) at Ouse Valley, and a win at home against the Cambridgeshire Cats. Ultimately, the Cheetahs went 4–6.

A number of changes occurred within the Cheetahs hierarchy at the start of the 2016 season. Former player Conrad Elliott took over as head coach and defensive coordinator, whilst Luke Clark made the step-up to chairman alongside his other duties as committee member and offensive lineman. On the field, results did not go the Cheetahs way. A 0–10 season was ultimately saved by off-field spirit and a willingness to rebound in 2017. Unfortunately Coach Elliott had to step down after the season, with offensive coordinator Roger Brown taking over as interim head coach – the beginnings of a restructuring of the coaching and committee structure for the 2017 season.

2017 was a year of improvement for the Cheetahs as the senior team would go on a 7 Game win streak under Roger Brown. Starting with a 63–0 Win over the Hastings Conquerors and followed by subsequent 50 Point games against the Berkshire Renegades, Maidstone Pumas and Bournemouth Bobcats. The Cheetahs would make the playoffs even after injuries caught up with the team which lead to them dropping their last 3 games. The Cheetahs went into the playoffs believing they could go the distance but came up short against a promotion driven Wembley Stallions in a 27–0 Loss. Whilst promotion was the goal, a 7–3 Season was a huge motivator. With a Junior side that went 3–3 and were Southern Trophy Runners up in an 8–6 Game against the Solent Seahawks and Youth Program who looked strong to start the season.

Due to personal circumstances Roger Brown had to leave the club, and Craig Barnes was voted in as the new head coach. Will Sparke took over duties as offensive coordinator, having previously assisted with special teams.

== Uniform ==
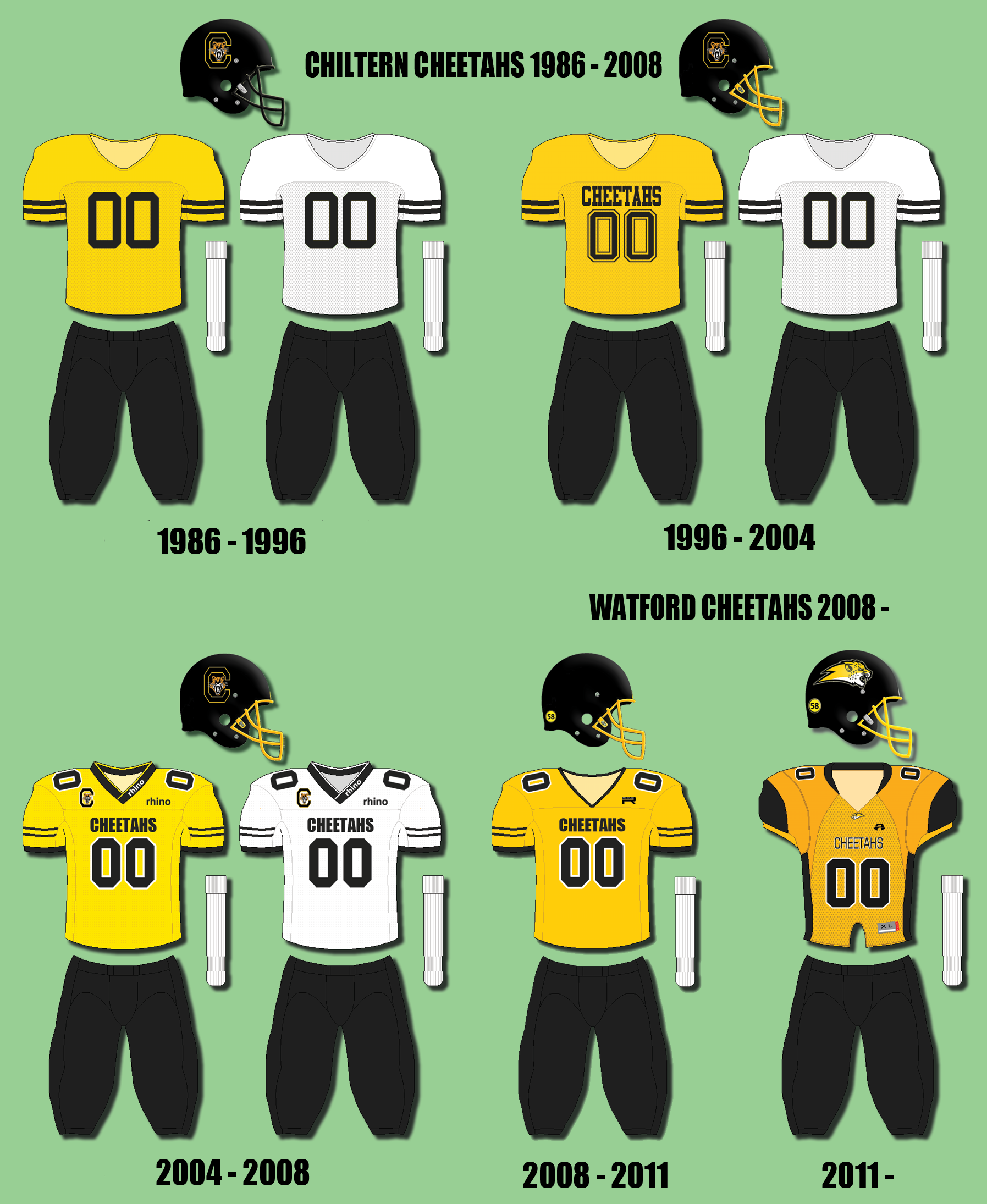
Cheetahs uniform history from 1986 to the present day

The team has worn the colours of Gold and Black ever since the club's inception in 1986, given that the Cheetah is of a golden colour fur plus the fact that the club's founders were passionate fans of the Pittsburgh Steelers, hence why the club calls its primary colour "Steeltown Gold".

The uniform mainly consisted of yellow/gold jerseys with black numbers and sleeve stripes with black pants and white socks with a white road jersey. Due to budget reasons some of the early uniforms and the uniforms from the 1990s and early 2000s (decade) were mixed together with the black "CHEETAHS" type appearing on the back of the some jerseys as well as the front.

In 2004 the Cheetahs invested in a new uniform made by UK-based Rhino Sports, in a lighter shade of gold and including the Chiltern logo on the left shoulder and had a more fitted look and feel. This coincided with the two most successful seasons in Cheetahs history, making an appearance in two Bowl games as well as their least successful season in 2006.

The move to Watford meant that the Cheetahs had to update their uniform. This would be made by Rhino again and was of a stronger material, the Chiltern logo omitted for obvious reasons and was of a darker, more amber looking colour.

The Cheetahs next major investment came in 2011 with a much more dynamic, striking design made by Alpha Performance, the jersey was much more fitted, the main body was of traditional airtex material with professional-looking tackle twill numbering. Gone were the two black sleeve stripes, which formed part of the Cheetahs uniform since the very beginning.

The uniform was changed again in 2017 to one with shoulder numbers on a black yoke.

A new uniform was used for the first time in 2021 in the Thames Valley Division. White shirts were added in 2022 while playing in SFC1 West.

== Logo ==
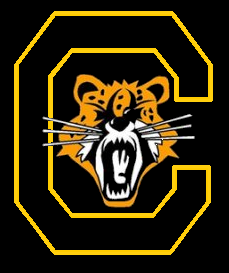
Chiltern Cheetahs logo used until 2008

Ever since the club was formed in 1986, the Cheetahs have always used the picture of a cheetah in some form. Not much is known about the very earliest logo but the main one which was used until 2008 consisted of an aggressive cheetah's face surrounded by a "C" for Chiltern. As was the case with the uniform, the move to Watford meant that the current logo was no longer viable so the club changed the logo to a more modern, dynamic side-on Cheetah head which was formally introduced on the Cheetahs' helmets in the 2011 season.

== Senior team season records ==
Season	Division	Wins	Losses	Ties	PF	PA	Final position	Playoff record	Notes
1987	Capital League, County division	7	3	0	237	131	3 / 6	—	—
1988	BNGL County Division	0	6	0	18	118	3 / 3	—	—
1989	BNGL Premier Division South A	3	7	0	153	215	4 / 5	—	—
1990	BNGL Premier Division South	2	8	0	76	193	4 / 4	—	—
1991	BNGL First Division East Midlands	3	5	2	95	124	4 / 6	—	—
1992	BNGL First Division South Midlands	6	4	0	114	139	3 / 5	—	—
1993	BNGL First Division South Central	9	1	0	257	63	1 / 6	Beat Weymouth Renegades 15–8 in wild-card match. Lost 15–22 to Hereford Chargers in quarter-final.	Conference champions.
1994	BAFA Division 3 Midlands	2	8	0	105	194	5 / 6	—	—
1995	BAFA Division 3 South Central	3	7	0	66	183	3 / 4	—	—
1996	BSL Division 3 Midlands	5	5	0	244	141	4 / 6	—	—
1997	BSL Division 2 Midlands	7	3	0	367	147	2 / 5	Beat Leicester Huntsmen 27–14 in quarter-final. Beat Yorkshire Rams 26–16 in semi-final. Lost 6–27 to Bristol Aztecs in final.	—
1998	BSL Division 2 South West	1	7	0	54	300	4 / 4	—	—
1999	BSL Division 2 Southern	0	10	0	42	267	7 / 7	—	—
2000	BSL Division 2 South	3	4	1	127	178	3 / 5	—	—
2001	BSL Division 2 South	3	5	0	171	207	6 / 9	—	—
2002	BSL Division 2 South	3	5	1	89	183	5 / 9	—	—
2003	BSL Division 2 South East	5	5	0	148	253	4 / 8	—	—
2004	BSL Division 2 South East	10	0	0	235	60	1 / 6	Beat South Wales Warriors 30–6 in quarter-final. Beat Sussex Thunder 34–6 in semi-final. Lost 16–32 to Doncaster Mustangs in final.	Conference champions. Promoted to Division 1A.
2005	BAFL Division 1A South	2	8	0	85	217	3 / 4	Beat Staffordshire Surge 18–12 in wild-card match. Beat London Blitz 9–6 in semi-final. Lost 0–7 to Bristol Aztecs in final.	—
2006	BAFL Division 1A South	0	10	0	32	301	4 / 4	—	Relegated to Division 2.
2007	BAFL Division 2 South East	2	8	0	107	283	5 / 6	—	–
2008	BAFL Division 2 East	2	7	1	94	305	4 / 5	—	Team renamed Watford Cheetahs prior to start of season.
2009	BAFL Division 2 East	4	6	0	157	197	3 / 4	—	—
2010	BAFACL Division 2 West	5	5	0	158	179	3 / 6	—	—
2011	BAFACL Division 2 East	7	3	0	235	95	4 / 7	—	—
2012	BAFANL Division 2 East	3	7	0	163	176	5 / 6	—	—
2013									
2014		10	0	0				Lost in the quarter-final.	
2015		4	6	0				Lost in the semi-final.	
2016	BAFA Division 1 SFC	0	10	0	77	343	6/6	–	–
2017	BAFA Division 2 SFC 2 East	7	3				3/6		
