= Portsmouth Dreadnoughts =

American Football team based in the United Kingdom

Portsmouth Dreadnoughts
Year formed	2012; 14 years ago
Team colours	Navy, Grey and Yellow
Head coach	Andrew Wood
League	BAFA National Leagues South West Division
Website	http://portsmouthdreadnoughts.co.uk/

The Portsmouth Dreadnoughts are an American football team currently based in Portsmouth, England. The club was founded in 2012. The team is named after the famous battleship HMS Dreadnought that was built in Portsmouth in 1906. The team play in the BAFA National Leagues South West Division.

== History ==
The Portsmouth Dreadnoughts were founded in April 2012 by four players, Pete Southwood, Ben Bell, Tom Cahill and David Bennett. They had met whilst playing and coaching for the Solent Thrashers, but found that the travel considerations of a long drive to Southampton from Horndean were significant enough to make them look into how to keep playing American Football, but not at such a distance.

The team's first game was played against the Plymouth Extreme.

The Dreadnoughts were admitted to the National league for the start of the 2014 season. They failed to win a game in their first season which was brought to an early end when they were disqualified from the last 4 games of the season for bringing the game into disrepute by allowing unregistered coaches to participate and for permitting someone to participate in club activities whilst banned for safeguarding reasons. The Dreadnoughts returned to the National Leagues for the start of the 2015 season, during which they recorded their first ever league win in a 48 points to 15 victory over the Hastings Conquerors
