= Bournemouth Bobcats =

American Football team based in the UK

The Bournemouth Bobcats is an English American football team based in Bournemouth, Dorset competing in the first division of the British American Football Association's Southern Conference. The team's home ground is at Slades Farm, Bournemouth, BH10 4BU.

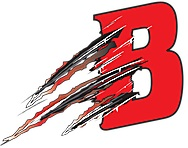
Bournemouth Bobcats Logo

== Early history ==
The club was originally formed in 1986, winning the Budweiser Premier Bowl in 1987 and playing in the league's top division between 1988 and 1991 before folding.

== Reformation ==
The Bobcats reformed in 2009 and entered BAFA Community Leagues as an associate member in 2010. The newly formed Bobcats played 5 games (2–3) over the 2010 summer months, concluding with a 34–12 win over Bristol Apache away.

== Recent history ==
=== 2011 ===
In 2011, after losing their opening three matches, the Bobcats bounced back against the Gloucester Banshees, beating them away then at home to go 2–3 with a new offensive co-ordinator. In the following games, the Bobcats lost away at South Wales and at home to the eventual division winners Reading in a close game. The Bobcats then had a fantastic win against the well established Cornish Sharks beating them at home 20–12. Another win against their main rivals the Bristol Apache at home and a loss in the final game to South Wales; the Bobcats ended their first season with a 4–6 record.

=== 2012 ===
2012 saw the Bobcats re-enter the British leagues with a new head coach, Derek Burridge. The inaugural season ended up with a 4–6 record with wins against three out of the five clubs in the division.

=== 2013 ===
For the 2013 season, Mark Newell took over the role as head coach and oversaw a disappointing year for the team with them ending up with a 1–9 season. The only win being a hard-fought last game of the season against rookie team Swindon Storm resulting in a 14–13 win.

=== 2015 ===
Led by head coach Tim Iles, who took on responsibilities, The Bobcats went 4–6 with wins at home and away against Portsmouth and Hastings. The away win at Hastings was a successful performance of the Bobcats who travelled light in squad numbers, had a number of key players either missing or playing both ways and also had to wait for an hour after one of the Bobcats players received treatment for a serious leg injury.

==== 2015 player award winner ====
Award	Player
Team MVP	Tom Burn

=== 2016 ===
The Bobcats 2016 season would turn out to be one of their most successful in the current period. Finishing with a strong 7–2 record and missing out on the play-offs by points difference.

==== 2016 player award winner ====
Award	Player
Team MVP	Craig MacDonald

=== 2017 ===
Having recruited strongly in the off-season the 2017 season did not take the course originally planned and serious injuries left an undersized Bobcats squad finishing with a disappointing 3–7 record.

==== 2017 player award winners ====
Award	Player
Team MVP	Craig MacDonald
Offensive MVP	Davy Baker
Defensive MVP	Duncan Ross
Offensive coaches' MVP	Gregory Coope
Defensive coaches' MVP	Tom Burn
Rookie of the season	Will Brooks
Newcomer of the season	Connor Clark
Most improved offensive player	Andrea Colosio
Most improved defensive player	Tommi Morgan

=== 2018 ===
The 2018 season showed improvement over the previous season and ended with a 3–4–1 record, with several rookies joining the team.

==== 2018 player award winners ====
Award	Player
Team MVP	Craig MacDonald
Offensive MVP	Titi Geas
Defensive MVP	Sam Williams
Offensive coaches' MVP	Adam Bowley
Defensive coaches' MVP	Will Brooks
Rookie of the season	James Leeland
Newcomer of the season	Paddy King
Most improved offensive player	Nathaniel Thatcher
Most improved defensive player	Michael Dowthwaite

== 2019 ==
The Bobcats had their most successful season since reforming. A 6–2 regular season record was enough to lead the Bobcats into the play-offs. Having put up big scores in the quarter-final against Norwich Devils and then Essex Spartans in the semi-final, they booked their place in the Britbowl XXIII South Division 2 Championship.

Unfortunately, the Bobcats lost a close encounter against the South Wales Warriors. However, with victory over Essex Spartans in the Playoff Semi-final, they had already secured promotion to Division 1. The 2020 season will see the Bobcats take on a new challenge of Division 1 football and back to a 10-game schedule.

=== Regular season results ===
Home team	Score	Away team	Result
Bournemouth Bobcats	19-2	Jurassic Coast Raptors	W
Bournemouth Bobcats	33-39	London Blitz B	L
London Blitz B	17-10	Bournemouth Bobcats	L
Bournemouth Bobcats	51-0	Swindon Storm	W
Swindon Storm	7-17	Bournemouth Bobcats	W
Jurassic Coast Raptors	6-44	Bournemouth Bobcats	W
Bournemouth Bobcats	52-0	Hastings Conquerors	W
Hastings Conquerors	0-60	Bournemouth Bobcats	W

=== Post season results ===
Stage	Home team	Score	Away team	Result	Match Film
Playoff Quarter-final	Norwich Devils	6-30	Bournemouth Bobcats	W	
Playoff Semi-final	Essex Spartans	20-42	Bournemouth Bobcats	W	
Playoff Final*	Bournemouth Bobcats	0-13	South Wales Warriors	L	Britbowl XXXIII film

*Played at neutral venue- New River Stadium, London.

==== 2019 player award winners ====
Award	Player
Team MVP	Craig MacDonald
Offensive MVP	Craig MacDonald
Defensive MVP	David Isaacs
Offensive coaches' MVP	Nacho Moreno
Defensive coaches' MVP	Matt Clarkson
Rookie of the season	Miles Badcock
Newcomer of the season	Joe Edwards
Most improved offensive player	Carl Phillips
Most improved defensive player	Nathaniel Thatcher

== 2020 ==
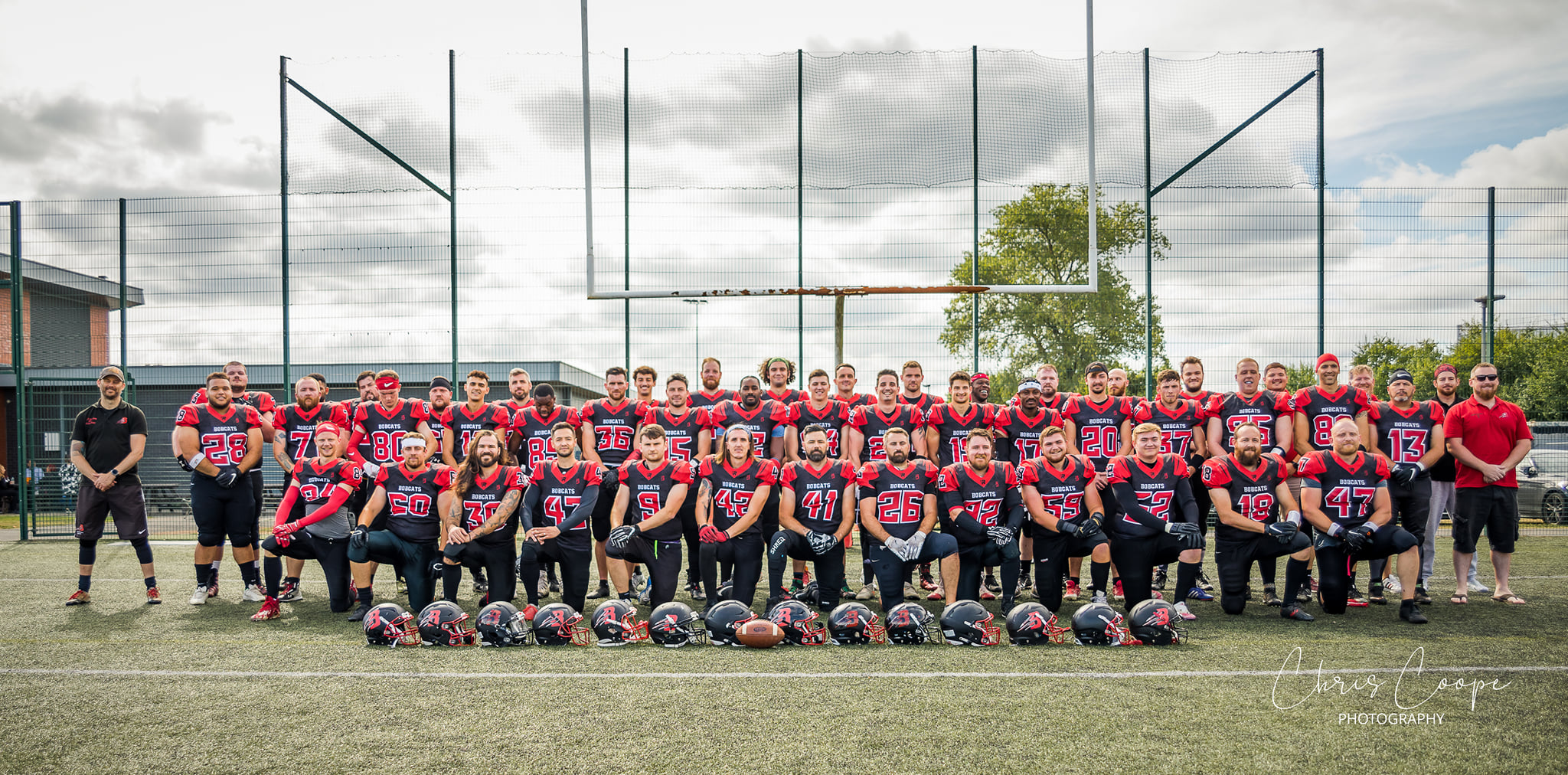
Bournemouth Bobcats pictured before their away fixture v Solent Thrashers in the 2020 season

With the unfortunate outbreak of COVID-19, the 2020 regular season was cancelled.

== 2021 ==
The Bobcats opted to take part in a regional Wessex Division which consisted of fellow Division 1 teams Portsmouth Dreadnoughts, Sussex Thunder, Rushmoor Knights and Premier Division team Solent Thrashers.

=== 2021 results ===
Home team	Score	Away team	Result
Bournemouth Bobcats	20-0	Portsmouth Dreadnoughts	W
Bournemouth Bobcats	8-31	Rushmoor Knights	L
Sussex Thunder	16-19	Bournemouth Bobcats	W
Bournemouth Bobcats	27-6	Rushmoor Knights	W
Bournemouth Bobcats	14-33	Solent Thrashers	L
Bournemouth Bobcats	H-W	Sussex Thunder	W
Rushmoor Knights	3-12	Bournemouth Bobcats	W
Solent Thrashers	48-14	Bournemouth Bobcats	L

=== Wessex League final standings ===
Team	P	W	L	PF	PC	PCT
Solent Thrashers	8	8	0	261	62	100
Bournemouth Bobcats	8	5	3	115	137	62.5
Rushmoor Knights	8	4	4	104	130	50
Portsmouth Dreadnoughts	1	0	1	0	20	0
Sussex Thunder	8	0	8	23	146	0

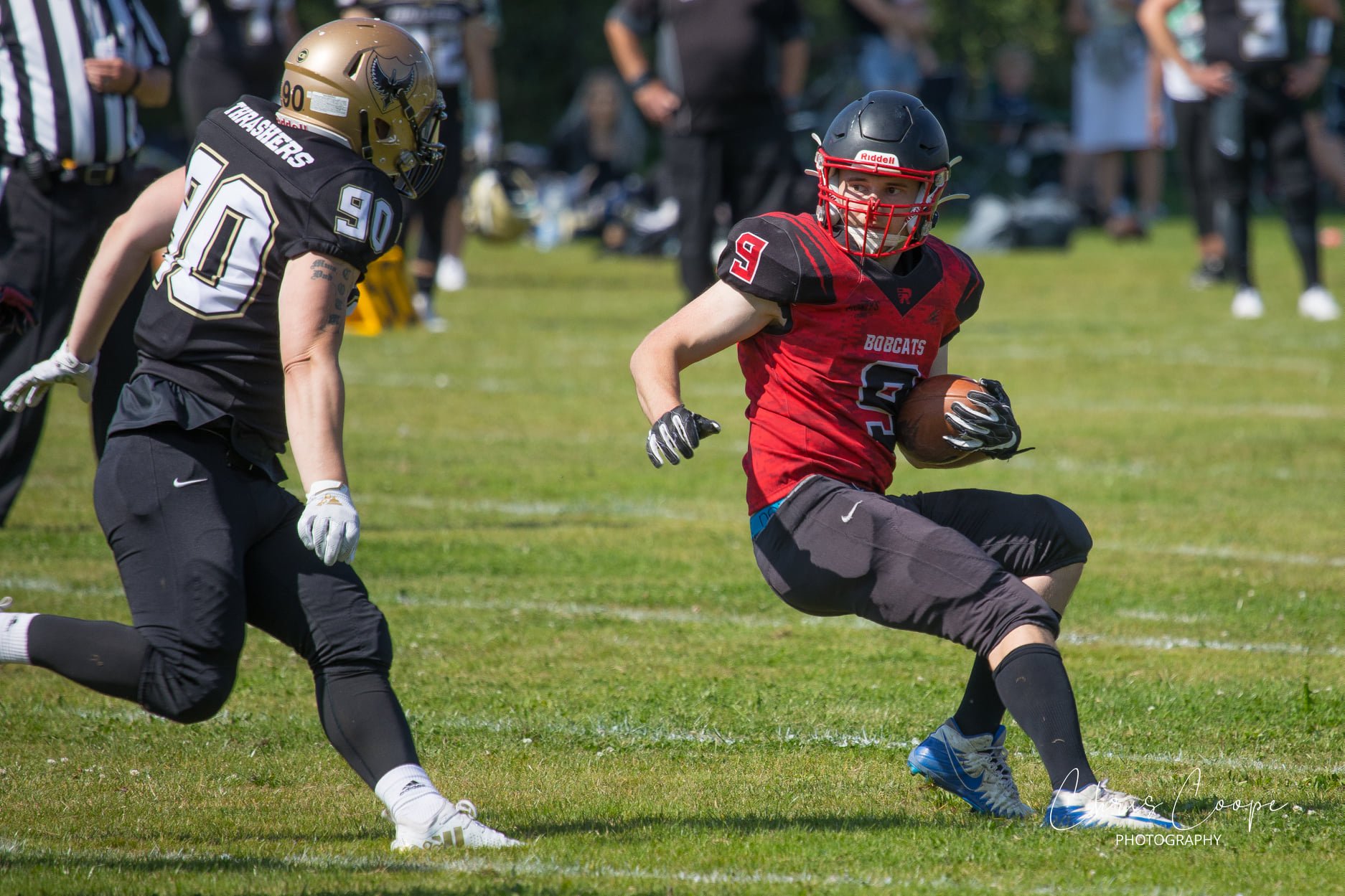
Bournemouth Bobcats 2020 MVP David Isaacs

==== 2021 player award winners ====
Award	Winner	Runner-up
Team MVP	David Isaacs	Craig MacDonald
Offensive MVP	Carl Phillips	Jonathan Gentile
Defensive MVP	Michael Myers	Tim Chapman
Offensive coaches' MVP	Jonathan Gentile	
Defensive coaches' MVP	Tim Chapman	
Offensive Rookie of the season	Aaron Heald	Daniel Shaw
Defensive Rookie of the season	Michael Myers	Perry Pedrosa
Newcomer of the season	Rory Gallagher	Mark Ward
Most improved offensive player	Aaron Heald	Daniel Shaw
Most improved defensive player	Max Cheater	Tim Chapman

== 2022 ==
The Bobcats lined up in their SFC 1 West Division against- South Wales Warriors, Portsmouth Dreadnoughts, Oxford Saints, Rushmoor Knights and Hertfordshire Cheetahs.

=== 2022 results ===
Home team	Score	Away team	Result
Rushmoor Knights	31-15	Bournemouth Bobcats	L
Bournemouth Bobcats	23-7	Portsmouth Dreadnoughts	W
Bournemouth Bobcats	9-14	Hertfordshire Cheetahs	L
Bournemouth Bobcats	12-4	South Wales Warriors	W
Portsmouth Dreadnoughts	3- 21	Bournemouth Bobcats	W
Bournemouth Bobcats	7-3	Rushmoor Knights	W
Oxford Saints	14-21	Bournemouth Bobcats	W
South Wales Warriors	12-6	Bournemouth Bobcats	L
Bournemouth Bobcats	14-0	Oxford Saints	W
Hertfordshire Cheetahs	18-20	Bournemouth Bobcats	W

== Current staff ==
Name	Position
Keith Barnes	General Manager
Simon McLean	Head coach
Will Brooks	Defensive Co-ordinator
Simon McLean	Offensive Co-ordinator
Harry James	Hydration Officer

== Current player roster ==
Squad Number	Name	Position
1	Craig MacDonald	QB
2	Harry James	MID
3	Abe Day	DB
4	Alister Coleman	LB
5	Sam Chance	QB
6	Joe Genovesa	LB
7	Rhys Jenkins	RB
8	Aaron Heald	RB
9	David Isaacs	LB
10	Joe Edwards	WR
11	Daniel Shaw	WR
12	Eamonn Knight	WR
13	Keith Barnes	TE
14	Kieran Higgins	WR/QB
15	Michael Myers	LB
16	Douglas Williams	LB
17	Edward Dimuna	DB
18	Sam Williams	LB
19	Tim Chapman	FS
20	Robert Chandler	DB
21	Al Melly	DB
22	James Leeland	DB
23	Harry James	MID
24	Tom Burn	S
25	Jordan Stovold	DB
26	Davy Baker	RB
27	Harry James	MID
28	Harry James	MID
29	Harry James	MID
30	Perry Pedrosa	DB
31	Harry James	MID
32	Karim Doukir	DB
33	Harry James	MID
34	Harry James	MID
35	Simon McClean	QB
36	Alex Wilkins	DB
37	Harry James	MID
38	Craig Golding	DB
39	Tom Meaker	DB
40	Harry James	MID
41	Elliot Withers	DB
42	Nathan Campbell	DL
43	Max Cheater	DB
44	Jordan Wells-West	DL
45	Harry James	MID
46	Charles Turland	
47	Dale Powell	RB
48	Leo Abate	LB
49	Harry James	MID
50	Pete Millner	
51	Harry James	MID
52	Harry James	MID
53	Chris Bhamra	LB
54	Will Cameron	LB
55	Harry James	MID
56	Jack Naish	LB
57	Darren Parry	OL
58	Sam Goodman	
59	Harry James	MID
60	Mike Schneider	OL
61	Harry James	MID
62	Harry James	MID
63	James Walton	DL
64	Harry James	MID
65	Harry James	MID
66	Luke Clark	OL
67	Ross Bridger	OL
68	David Hayter	OL
69	Adam Bowley	OL
70	Alex Lyndon	OL
71	Jamie Joy	OL
72	Dan Lyndon	OL
73	Harry Tubbs	OL
74	Chandler Price	OL
75	Jack Durdle	OL
76	Harry James	MID
77	Paddy King	DL
78	Phil Newby	OL
79	James Underwood	DL
80	Rob Howard	WR
81	Jordan Nicholls	WR
82	Harrison Cooper	TE
83	Taryn McColm	WR
84	Carl Phillips	WR
85	Wyatt Ko	WR
86	John Costa	LB
87	Ollie Ashton	TE
88	Jonathan Gentile	TE
89	Jason Griffith	WR
90	Harry James	MID
91	Michael Day	DL
92	James Minton	DL
93	Will Brooks	DL
94	Miles Badcock	DB
95	Liam Chamberlain	DL
96	Stuart Hodson	DL
97	Rory Gallagher	DL
98	Nathan Newman	DL
99	Harry James	MID
