= Colchester Gladiators =

American football team in the UK

Logo

General information
- Founded: 1983
- Stadium: Corporal Budd VC Gymnasium, Colchester

Personnel
- Head coach: Scotty Taylor

League / conference affiliations
- BAFA National Leagues; National League

Championships
- League championships: 0; 2013
- Division championships: 0; 2 (1988, 2013)

Current uniform
Home

Away

The Colchester Gladiators are an American Football team competing in the South East National League of British American Football League (BAFL). They play their home games at the Corporal Budd VC Gymnasium.

== Background ==
The club was first formed in 1983 and entered senior competition in 1985 where they enjoyed a degree of success, winning the Budweiser League Premier Division playoffs in 1988 and only failing to make the post season playoffs on three occasions before the team folded in 1995. They reformed again in 2003 after a high-profile charity reunion match which featured TV presenter Dermot O'Leary. The Gladiators entered the BAFL the following year, gaining promotion in 2006 only to be relegated after just one season. The Gladiators went on to win the 2013 National League title after recording an unbeaten 13–0 season (including the play-offs).

== History ==
=== Team formation (1983 to 1995) ===
The Colchester Gladiators were formed in October 1983 by a group of friends at a time when American football first started to attract interest in the United Kingdom. After playing competitive matches during the summer of 1984, they were accepted into the American Football League UK for the 1985 season where they competed in the Southern Division. They finished second in their group, qualifying for the playoffs at their first attempt before losing their wild-card match against the London Ravens, who eventually became the league champions.

They transferred to the Budweiser League the following year, finishing third in their first season before winning the Premier Division Southeast Conference in 1987. After a comfortable win over the Cotswold Bears in the quarter-finals, they lost their semi-final to the Leeds Cougars. For the 1988 season, they competed in the North London & East Conference which they won with a perfect 10–0 record, scoring 526 points in their ten games, the second highest total in the entire league. They continued this form going into the playoffs, shutting out the Portsmouth Warriors in the first round before recording a 29–7 win at the Bristol Packers. They were then drawn at home to the London Capitals, who they narrowly beat by a single point to set up a final clash against the Brighton B-52s. They dominated this match, winning 47–28 to claim the divisional title.

Instead of taking promotion up to the National Division of the Budweiser League, the Gladiators' management decided to transfer to the Combined Gridiron League instead, where they competed in the top Crown National Division. Just as they did the previous season, they topped their conference with a perfect 10–0 record, conceding just 42 points. After defeating the Leicester Huntsmen, they again faced the Portsmouth Warriors. However, they were unable to reproduce the previous season's result, losing a high-scoring game 36–50 and so ending a 25-game winning streak.

By this time, the Gladiators were attracting interest from local media, with regular radio coverage provided by SGR and BBC Essex. They also attracted large crowds, with a record attendance of 1800 – these figures were rivalling those of local soccer team Colchester United (who at that time were struggling to stay in the English Football League), so much so that they enlisted the help of the police to manage game day traffic and parking. They also received television coverage from the BBC and Anglia TV.

In 1990, they played one season in the National Conference Marketing and Management Association (NCMMA), who had taken over operation of the CGL's Crown National Division. They finished second in the Central Conference with a 6–4 record, and lost their first playoff match to the London Capitals.

The following year, they merged with the Chelmsford Cherokee, renaming themselves as the Essex Gladiators, and playing some games at Melbourne Stadium, Chelmsford and some at Gloucester Park, Basildon. They occupied the Cherokee's spot in the NDMA Coca-Cola League Southern Conference, where they finished third in their nine-team group with a 7–3 record, before losing their playoff quarter-final at home to the Nottingham Hoods. The following season saw them struggle, finishing bottom of their group after winning just one match.

At the end of the 1992 season, a merger was proposed between the Essex Gladiators and Kent Mustangs. However, this proposal fell through, and as a result the team name was returned to the original Colchester Gladiators. They transferred over to the British National Gridiron League and competed in the Premier Division Southeast Conference where they finished third out of four teams, thus finishing outside the playoffs. In 1994, they switched leagues again, this time to the British American Football Association, where they played in the Midlands Conference of Division Three. They finished second in this group with a 7–2–1 record before losing their playoff quarter-final to the Chester Romans.

They were re-aligned to the East Midlands conference the following season, where they finished top with a 9–1 record. After beating their local conference rivals the Southend Sabres in their quarter-final, they were drawn to play away to the Oxford Saints, where they lost by a single point. Despite their success in the leagues, lack of sponsorship money and problems with a permanent home ground put the Gladiator organisation under extreme pressure and the decision was taken to leave the league set up. The club folded soon afterwards.

=== Gladiators reform (2003 to present) ===
In October 2003, the decision was made to reform the Colchester Gladiators to mark the 20th anniversary of the team's founding, and so a charity match was set up against the local university team, the Essex Blades. The team management managed to enlist the services of 50 veteran players, together with local TV presenter Dermot O'Leary, who played in the match as a punt returner. In front of an estimated crowd of 800 people, together with TV cameras from Sky Sports (who showed highlights of the match with interviews twice during their American Football coverage) and Anglia TV, and cameras from Heat Magazine and the Evening Gazette, the Gladiators dominated the game, winning 50–8 and raising £2,500 for the Barnardo's children's charity.

The Gladiators were accepted into the British American Football League, which they entered the South East Conference of Division Two. They finished third with a 4–5–1 record, missing out on a playoff spot to their local rivals the Essex Spartans. The club benefitted from the lifting of signing restrictions, enabling them to register a squad of over 60 players for the 2006 season. As a result, they won Division Two East with an 8–2 record ahead of the Norwich Devils. Unfortunately, the Devils got some revenge by defeating the Gladiators in a wild-card playoff.

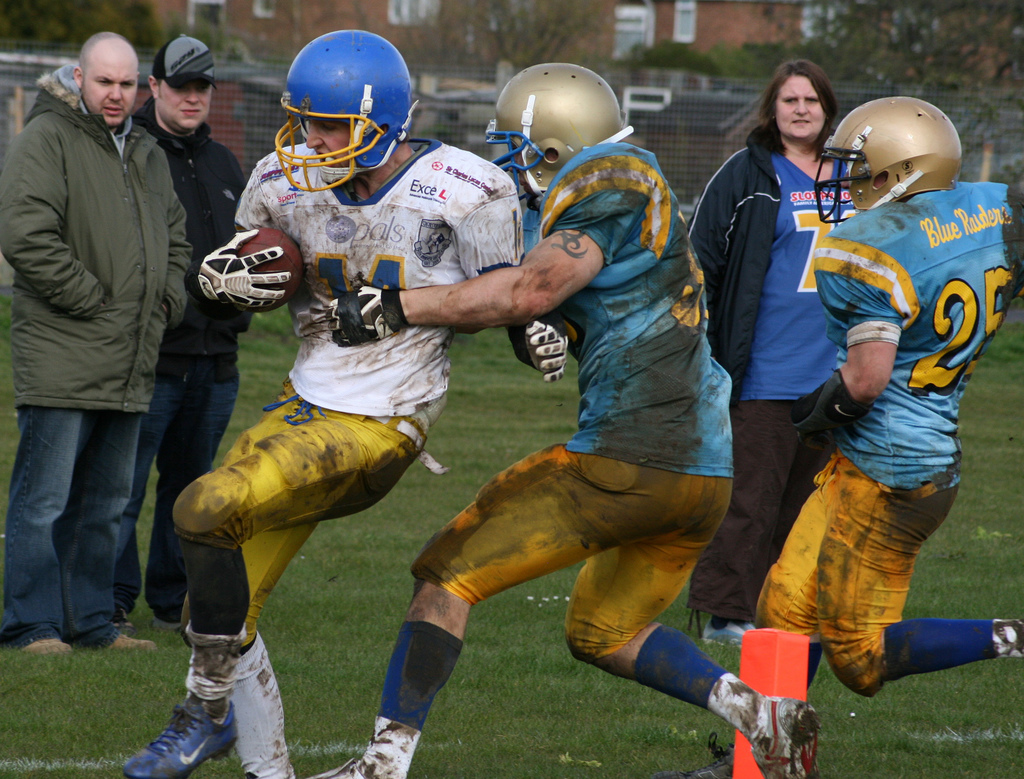
Gladiators running back scores a touchdown against the Bedfordshire Blue Raiders in 2008

Despite this defeat, the Gladiators were promoted to Division One after the BAFL was restructured for 2007. The club appointed a Youth Programme Head Coach as they sought to establish a long-term strategy. The team struggled at this higher level and they finished the season bottom of their conference with a 0–9–1 record, and so they were relegated back to Division Two South East for the 2008 season. The Gladiators finished the following season in second place after winning seven of their ten games. This was good enough to earn them a wild-card play-off match away to the South Wales Warriors, which they lost 12–21.

The following year saw them dominate their division, winning nine of their regular season games with one declared a tie after it was postponed due to a waterlogged pitch. Home victories against the Bedfordshire Blue Raiders and the Hampshire Thrashers in the play-offs saw the Gladiators qualify for the divisional final against the Leicester Falcons, and also guaranteed promotion to Division One. The final (played at the Keepmoat Stadium) was a high-scoring match, and was finally won by Falcons after Colchester scored a last-minute touchdown but failed to convert the extra point.

2013 saw the Gladiators finish with an unbeaten record in the regular season, finishing with a 10–0 record. After beating Bristol Apache at home, the Gladiators travelled to Southampton Solent, the only other undefeated team in the league, to determine the Southern representative in the National League Final. The Gladiators secured a 12–0 victory and went on to the final, where they beat the Gateshead Senators 33–13 to secure their first National League title since 1988.

=== Senior team season records ===
Season	Division	Wins	Losses	Ties	PF	PA	Final position	Playoff record	Notes
1985	American Football League UK, Southern Division	4	4	0	—	—	2 / 5	Lost 0–66 to the London Ravens in wild-card match.	—
1986	Budweiser League Division One Central	8	2	0	266	124	3 / 11	—	—
1987	Budweiser League Premier Division South East	9	1	0	317	103	1 / 6	Beat Cotswold Bears 66–0 in quarter-final. Lost 22–44 to Leeds Cougars in semi-final.	Conference champions.
1988	Budweiser League Premier Division North London & East	10	0	0	526	101	1 / 6	Beat Portsmouth Warriors 30–0 in first round. Beat Bristol Packers 29–7 in quarter-final. Beat Capital Tigers 34–33 in semi-final. Beat Brighton B-52s 47–28 in final.	Conference champions. Premier Division champions.
1989	Combined Gridiron League National Division Central	10	0	0	344	42	1 / 6	Beat Leicester Huntsmen 49–14 in quarter-final. Lost 36–50 to the Portsmouth Warriors in semi-final.	Conference champions.
1990	NCMMA Central Conference	6	4	0	355	229	2 / 5	Lost 23–35 to London Capitals in quarter-final.	Team merged with Chelmsford Cherokee to form Essex Gladiators prior to start of season. Gladiators took Cherokee's spot in NDMA Southern Conference for 1991 season.
1991	NDMA Division One South	7	3	0	268	219	3 / 9	Lost 10–61 to Nottingham Hoods in quarter-final.	—
1992	NDMA Division One South	1	9	0	48	402	6 / 6	—	—
1993	BNGL Premier Division South East	4	6	0	80	161	3 / 4	—	Team name reverted to Colchester Gladiators prior to start of season.
1994	BAFA Division Three Midlands	7	2	1	243	132	2 / 6	Lost 14–17 to Chester Romans in quarter-final.	—
1995	BAFA Division Three East Midlands	9	1	0	326	77	1 / 5	Beat Southend Sabres 24–13 in quarter-final. Lost 14–15 to Oxford Saints in semi-final.	Conference champions.
1996 to 2004	DID NOT COMPETE								
2005	BAFL Division Two South East	4	5	1	124	163	3 / 4	—	—
2006	BAFL Division Two East	8	2	0	201	185	1 / 4	Lost 14–32 to Norwich Devils in wild-card match.	Conference champions. Promoted to Division One.
2007	BAFL Division One South	0	9	1	51	283	6 / 6	—	Relegated to Division Two
2008	BAFL Division Two South East & London	7	3	0	263	180	2 / 5	Lost 12–21 to South Wales Warriors in wild-card match.	—
2009	BAFL Division Two East	9	0	1	427	54	1 / 4	Beat Bedfordshire Blue Raiders 41–16 in quarter-final. Beat Hampshire Thrashers 49–20 in semi-final.	Conference champions.

== Ground ==
During their first incarnation in the 1990s, the Colchester Gladiators played their home games at a number of different venues—this lack of a permanent home ground was one of the reasons cited by the club as a reason for folding in 1995. Since reforming, they had been based at the Broad Lane sports ground in Wivenhoe, which they shared with the local soccer team.

The stadium forms part of a larger sporting complex covering over 10 acres (4.0 ha), which was purchased from a private landowner in 1996 and developed in conjunction with Colchester Borough Council, the University of Essex, Wivenhoe Town Council, Wivenhoe Tennis Club, and the members and supporters of Wivenhoe Town Football Club. The stadium itself has a total capacity of 3,000 people, and comprises a 220-seat stand, covered standing for around 1,300, a clubhouse and bar, and parking for 150 cars. It is also one of only three American football venues in the United Kingdom to use a referee's microphone.

Though since 2010 the Colchester Gladiators have played their home games at the Royal Oak Stadium in Dovercourt which they share with the Harwich and Parkeston football team.

2013 saw the Gladiators return to Colchester at the Mill Road Rugby Club.

After four seasons at the Mill Road site the Gladiators moved to the Corporal Budd V.C. Gymnasium site on Berechurch Road on the other side of Colchester.

== Other teams and activities ==
In addition to the senior team, the Gladiators have run a youth team for players between the ages of 14 and 18 since 2008. The team play fully kitted football in the 9-a-side and 11-a-side categories. In the 2009 season, they played in the BAFL Youth's Central Conference, where they compete against the youth teams of the Birmingham Bulls, Cambridgeshire Cats, Norwich Devils, Peterborough Saxons, Tamworth Phoenix and the Redditch Arrows. They finished second in this division with a record of six wins, one defeats and one tie and qualified for the play-offs, where they lost 0–24 to the London Warriors.

During the early part of 2008 the Gladiators formed a Dance Team who perform at all the senior team's home games, as well as at club and other promotional events throughout the year. The Dance Team perform modern dance styles and are trained by a professional dance choreographer.

The Gladiators have also played friendly matches in other sports in order to strengthen ties with local organisations. In 2005, they played two challenge cricket matches against local teams. The first of these matches ended in a three wicket victory over Chappels & Wakes Colne CC, which included a three-wicket haul for defensive coach Karl Bourke. The second match ended in a heavy defeat to Frinton CC. In the 2006 close season, a number of Gladiators players joined together with a number of players from Colchester rugby club to play a friendly match at Harwich. After conceding an early try, they came back to win 25–5.
