= Rushmoor Knights =

American Football team based in England

Uniforms

General information
- Founded: 1985; 41 years ago
- Stadium: King George V playing fields
- Headquartered: Farnborough, Rushmoor, Hampshire
- Colours: Scarlet Red, Columbia Blue, Grey, White

Personnel
- Head coach: Coach Paul "Benny" Wakeford

League / conference affiliations
- BAFA National Leagues; Premiership South

Championships
- League championships: 1 (2004)
- Division championships: 3 (2000, 2007, 2015)

The Rushmoor Knights American Football Club (formerly Southern Seminoles, Personal Assurance Knights/PA Knights, Delonghi Knights, Farnham Knights) are a British American football club based in Rushmoor, Hampshire. The club has three teams; the Rushmoor Knights (20+), the Rushmoor Knights U19 (16–19) and the Rushmoor Knights U16 (14–16). The Knights play in the Premiership South of the British American Football Association National Leagues and were the Britbowl champions in 2004. They have an all-time record of 974–340–43 (.734).

== Origins ==
Farnham Knights Logo, 1985–2019

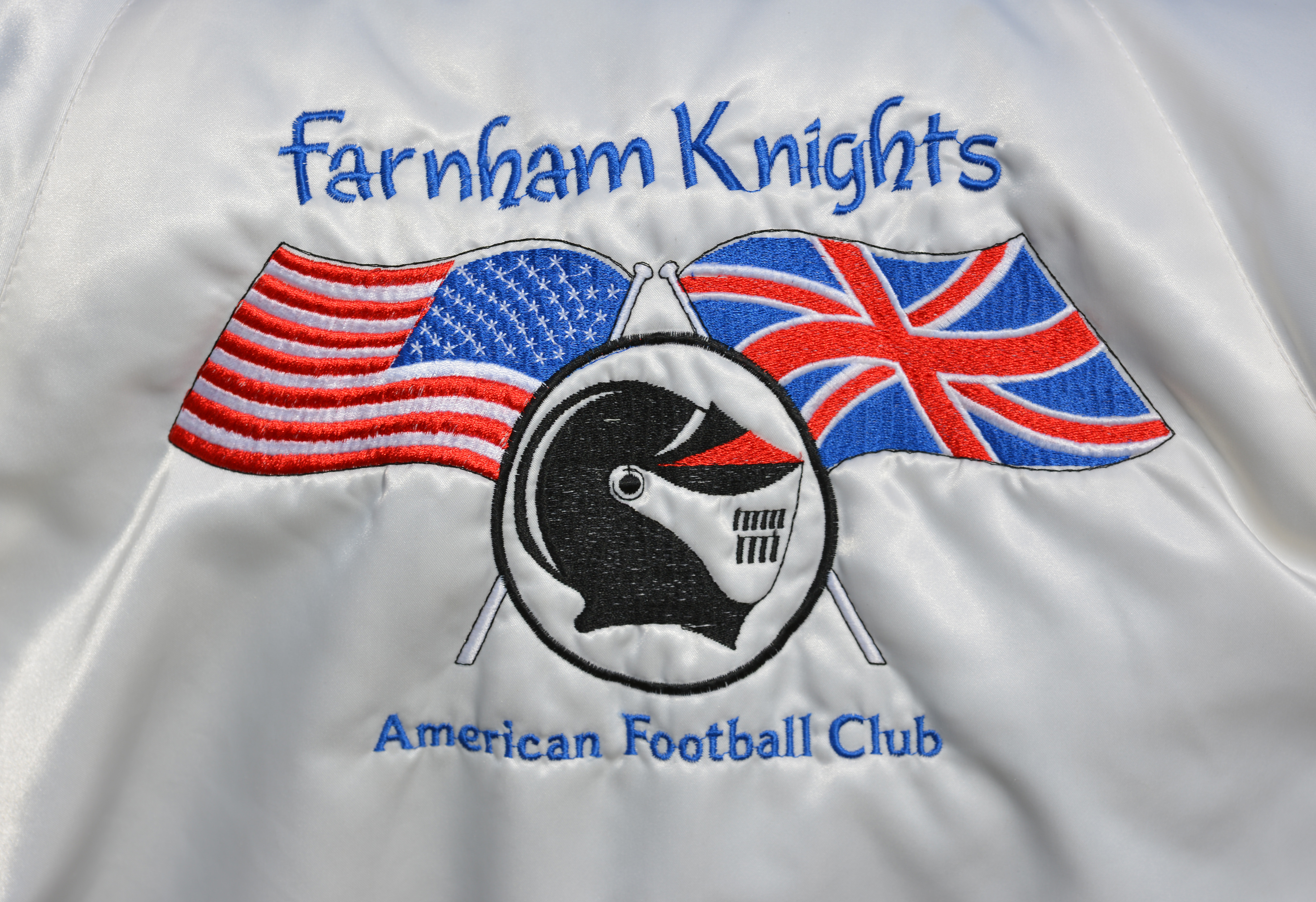
Cheerleader's jacket 2015

The team was founded as the Farnham Knights in 1985, under Head Coach Marc Salazar, who was an American service member, serving in the United States Air Force, at RAF Greenham Common. The team played their first friendly in 1985 as the Farnham Knights against the Thames Valley Chargers. The franchise joined the Budweiser League, Div 1, for the league's inaugural season in 1986 and went on to a successful 5 – 5 season. Their second season, 1987, saw the Knights complete their conference schedule undefeated to win their first conference title.

During 1994 the Farnham Knights merged with the Hampshire Cavaliers and were renamed the Southern Seminoles. Personal Assurance stepped in during 1997 to sponsor the side which led to the return of the Knights moniker, the Personal Assurance Knights. In 2007, MH Football Shop took over the main sponsorship of the club, to rename them the Farnham MH Knights.

In 2008, a new main sponsor, Fast Lane, stepped in with a two-year deal. The team were then known as the Farnham Fast Lane Knights.

== League placing and catchment ==
As the only club in the Blackwater Valley the Knights have drawn players from across Surrey and Hampshire, within 20 miles (32 km) are Woking, Guildford, Farnborough, Aldershot, Bracknell and Basingstoke.

All games were played at Farnham Rugby Club from 2013, the first season in the club's history that it has been based in the town of Farnham itself after only playing 1 game at Farnham Rugby Club's old ground in Wrecclesham. They have since moved to King George V playing fields in Farnborough back in the borough of Rushmoor, leading to the renaming.

Farnham Knights rebranded to the Rushmoor Knights ahead of the 2021 BAFANL season.

== Honours ==
- Budweiser League Div 1 Southern League Champions 1986
- BSL Div 2 Conference Champions 1987
- BNGL National Bowl Runners-Up 1992
- National Passball Champions 1993
- BSL Div 2 Conference Champions 1994
- BYAFA Youth National Runner-up 1994 (1)
- BYAFA Youth National Champions 1996 (1)
- BSL Div 2 Conference Champions 1997
- BYAFA Youth National Runner-up 1997 (1)
- BYAFA Youth National Runner-up 1998 (1)
- BSL Div 2 National Champions 2000
- BSL Div 2 Conference Champions 2000
- BSL Div 1 National Championship Runners-Up 2002
- BYAFA Junior Kitted Champions 2004
- EFAF Cup Runners Up 2004
- BSL Div 1 Southern Conference Champions 2004
- BAFL National Championship Winners 2004
- BAFL Div 1 Southern Conference Champions 2005
- BAFL Div 1 National Championship Runners up 2005
- BAFL Div 1 National Championship Winners 2007
- BAFL Youth National Championship Runners up 2007 (1)
- BAFL Youth National Championship Winners 2009 (1)
- BAFANL Youth South West Conference Champions 2013
- BAFANL Juniors Southern Conference Champions 2014
- BAFANL Juniors National Championship Runners up 2014
- BAFANL Southern Football Conference (Division 1) Champions 2015
- BAFANL Oak Bowl SFC Division 1 Play Off Final – Winners 2015

(1) Prior to 2011, the term "Youth" was used for 16 to 19 year olds. Since 2011, Youth is for 14 to 17 year olds and Juniors is for 16 to 19 year olds.

== Season-by-season records ==
1980s
| Head coach | Season | League | Won | Lost | Ties | Win % | Finish | Won | Lost | Win % | Result |
|---|---|---|---|---|---|---|---|---|---|---|---|
| Marc Salazar | 1985 | Budweiser League | 0 | 0 | 0 | .000 | — | 0 | 0 | .000 | — |
| Marc Salazar | 1986 | Budweiser League | 5 | 5 | 0 | .500 | — | 0 | 0 | .000 | — |
| Marc Salazar | 1987 | Budweiser League | 10 | 0 | 0 | 1.00 | — | 0 | 1 | .000 | Southern Division Champions. Lost to the Ashton Oilers in the postseason. |
| Marc Salazar | 1988 | NGL (Premiership) | 5 | 5 | 0 | .000 | 3rd | 0 | 0 | .000 | — |
| Frank Snyder | 1989 | CGL (Premiership) | 7 | 3 | 0 | .700 | — | 0 | 1 | .000 | Lost to the Rockingham Rebels in the postseason. |

1990s
| Head coach | Season | League | Won | Lost | Ties | Win % | Finish | Won | Lost | Win % | Result |
|---|---|---|---|---|---|---|---|---|---|---|---|
| Mike Hassett | 1990 | BNGL (Premiership) | 3 | 6 | 1 | .350 | — | 0 | 0 | .000 | — |
| John Archer | 1991 | BNGL (Premiership) | 7 | 3 | 0 | .700 | — | 1 | 1 | .500 | — |
| Richard Foster | 1992 | BNGL (Premiership) | 6 | 2 | 0 | .750 | — | 1 | 1 | .500 | Southern Division Champions. Lost to Colts 30–26 in the BNGL Championship. |
| Mike Reeves | 1993 | BNGL (Premiership) | 6 | 2 | 0 | .750 | — | 1 | 1 | .500 | Lost to the Bournemouth Buccanears in the Semi-finals. |
| Phil Maltby | 1994 | BNGL (Premiership) | 0 | 0 | 0 | .000 | — | 0 | 0 | .000 | Merged with the Hampshire Cavaliers, and played as a Southern Seminoles. |
| Phil Maltby | 1995 | BNGL (Premiership) | 0 | 0 | 0 | .000 | — | 0 | 0 | .000 | Played as the Southern Seminoles |
| Phil Maltby | 1996 | BNGL (Premiership) | 3 | 6 | 1 | .350 | — | 0 | 0 | 0 | Played as the Southern Seminoles |
| Steve Rains | 1997 | BNGL (Premiership) | 10 | 0 | 0 | 1.00 | — | 1 | 1 | .500 | Renamed to the Farnham Knights. Lost to the Bristol Aztecs in the Semi-finals 13–12. |
| Steve Rains | 1998 | BNGL (Premiership) | 4 | 6 | 0 | .400 | — | 0 | 0 | .000 | — |
| Steve Rains | 1999 | BNGL (Premiership) | 1 | 8 | 1 | .150 | — | 0 | 0 | .000 | Relegated to Division 2. |

2000s
| Head coach | Season | League | Won | Lost | Ties | Win % | Finish | Won | Lost | Win % | Result |
|---|---|---|---|---|---|---|---|---|---|---|---|
| Steve Rains | 2000 | Division 2 | 8 | 0 | 0 | 1.00 | — | 3 | 0 | .000 | Won the Division 2 National Championship vs Ipswich Cardinals 41–7. Promoted to Premiership. |
| Steve Rains | 2001 | Premiership | 5 | 3 | 0 | .625 | — | 0 | 1 | .000 | — |
| Steve Rains | 2002 | Premiership | 8 | 2 | 0 | .800 | — | 2 | 1 | .667 | Lost to London Olympians in the Championship. |
| Steve Rains | 2003 | Premiership | 8 | 2 | 0 | .800 | — | 0 | 1 | .000 | 1–1 in EFAF Play. |
| Steve Rains | 2004 | Premiership | 9 | 0 | 1 | .955 | — | 1 | 1 | .500 | Won the National Championship vs London Olympians 28–14. Qualified for the EFAF Cup. 1–2 in EFAF Play. |
| Steve Rains | 2005 | Premiership | 9 | 1 | 0 | .900 | — | 1 | 1 | .500 | Lost to London Olympians in Division 1 Championship 22–21. Qualified for the EFAF Cup. 1–1 in EFAF Play. |
| Steve Rains | 2006 | Premiership | 5 | 5 | 0 | .500 | — | 0 | 0 | .000 | Qualified for the EFAF Cup. 1–2 in EFAF Play. Relegated due to league reorganisation. |
| Steve Rains | 2007 | Division 1 | 10 | 0 | 0 | 1.00 | — | 2 | 0 | 1.00 | Won the Division 1 National Championship vs Ipswich Cardinals 47–7. |
| Ian Ellis | 2008 | — | 0 | 0 | 0 | 0.00 | — | — | — | — | — |
| Ian Ellis | 2009 | — | 0 | 0 | 0 | 0.00 | — | — | — | — | — |

2010s
| Head coach | Season | League | Won | Lost | Ties | Win % | Finish | Won | Lost | Win % | Result |
|---|---|---|---|---|---|---|---|---|---|---|---|
| Ian Ellis | 2010 | — | 0 | 0 | 0 | .000 | — | 0 | 0 | .000 | — |
| Ian Ellis | 2011 | — | 0 | 0 | 0 | .000 | — | 0 | 0 | .000 | — |
| | 2012 | — | 0 | 0 | 0 | .000 | — | 0 | 0 | .000 | Team withdrew from play for the 2012 Season. Relegated to Division 1. |
| Shaun Gray | 2013 | Division 1 | 0 | 0 | 0 | .000 | — | 0 | 0 | .000 | — |
| Steve Rains | 2014 | Division 1 | 9 | 1 | 0 | .900 | — | 0 | 1 | .000 | — |
| Steve Rains | 2015 | Division 1 | 8 | 1 | 1 | .855 | — | 2 | 0 | 1.00 | Division 1 South Champions. Promoted to the Premiership |
| Steve Rains | 2016 | Premiership | 0 | 0 | 0 | .000 | 4th | 0 | 0 | .000 | — |
| Tango Lockwood | 2017 | Premiership | 0 | 0 | 0 | .000 | — | 0 | 0 | .000 | — |
| Tango Lockwood | 2018 | Premiership | 0 | 0 | 0 | .000 | — | 0 | 0 | .000 | — |
| Tango Lockwood | 2019 | Premiership | 1 | 9 | 0 | .100 | — | 0 | 0 | .000 | Relegated to Division 1 for 2020 Season |

2020s
| Head coach | Season | League | Won | Lost | Ties | Win % | Finish | Won | Lost | Win % | Result |
|---|---|---|---|---|---|---|---|---|---|---|---|
| | 2020 | Division 1 | 0 | 0 | 0 | .000 | — | 0 | 0 | .000 | Season cancelled due to COVID-19. |
| Pete Fields | 2021 | Division 1 | 4 | 4 | 0 | .500 | 2nd (League) | 1 | 1 | .500 | Lost to Solent Thrashers in Division 1 Championship 34–14. |
| Pete Fields | 2022 | Division 1 | 8 | 2 | 0 | .800 | 3rd (League) | 0 | 1 | .000 | Lost to Hertfordshire Cheetahs in Divisional Round 21–12. |
| Paul Wakeford | 2023 | Division 1 | 6 | 4 | 0 | .600 | 5th (League) | 0 | 1 | .000 | Lost to London Olympians in Wildcard Round 24–21. |
| Paul Wakeford | 2024 | Division 1 | 8 | 0 | 0 | 1.00 | 1st (League) | 2 | 1 | .667 | Lost to Nottingham Caesars in Division 1 Championship 49–9. Earned promotion to the Premiership for the 2025 season. |
| Paul Wakeford | 2025 | Premiership | 4 | 6 | 0 | .40 | 4th (League) | 0 | 0 | .00 | |

=== Rushmoor Knights Hall of Fame ===
The Rushmoor Knights honor their most influential players, coaches, and contributors through their Hall of Fame.

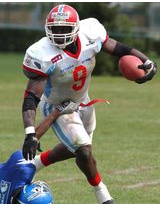
RB - Tony Stitt - 2021 BAFA Hall of Fame Inductee

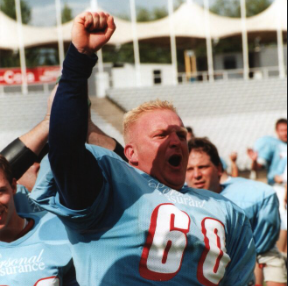
OL - Tango Lockwood - 2021 BAFA Hall of Fame Inductee

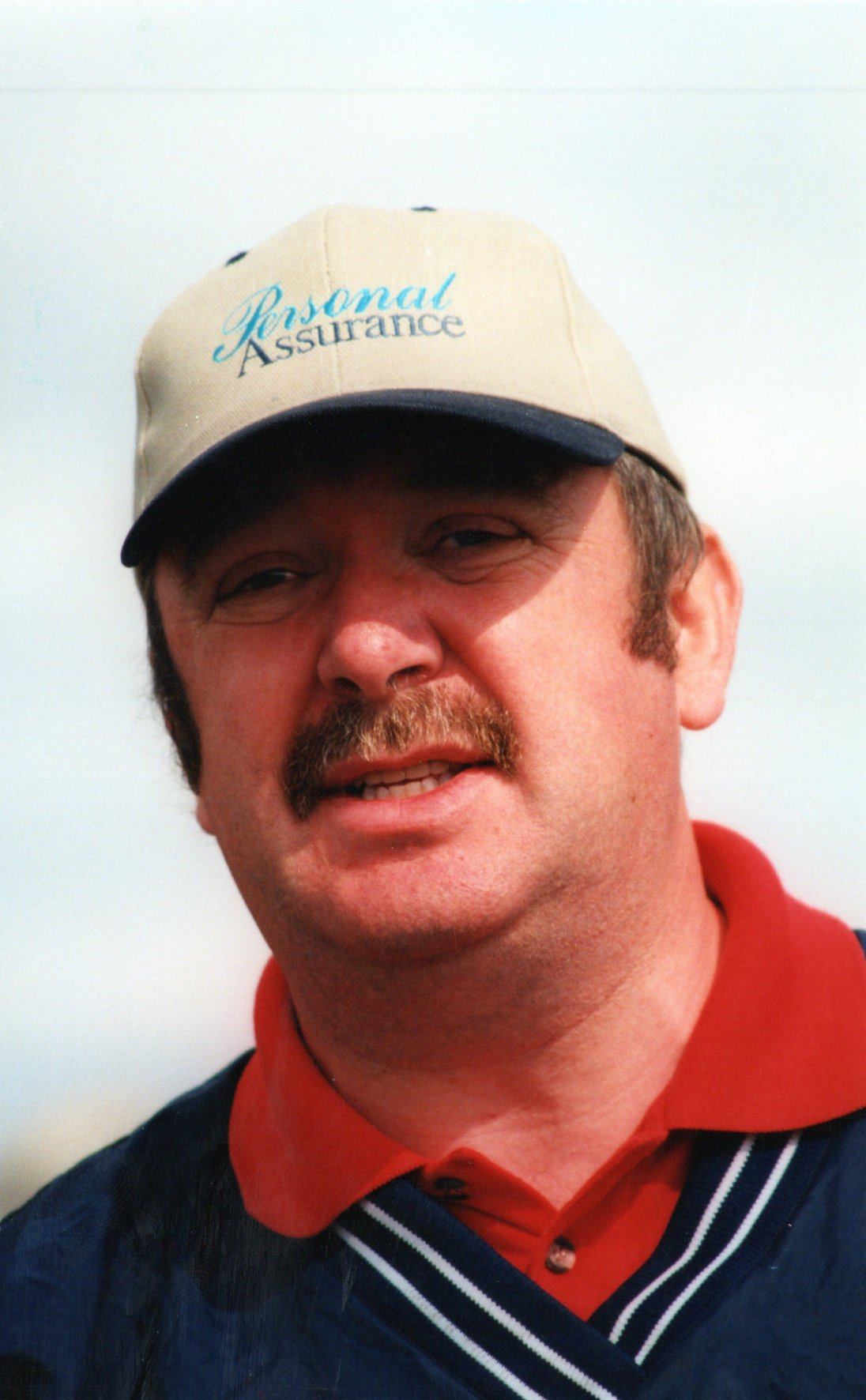
HC - Steve Rains

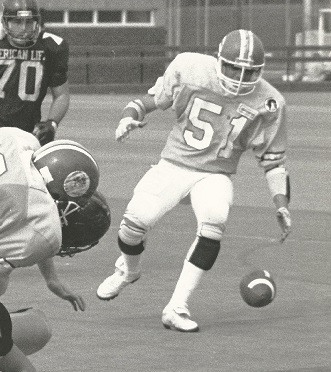
HC - Marc Salazar

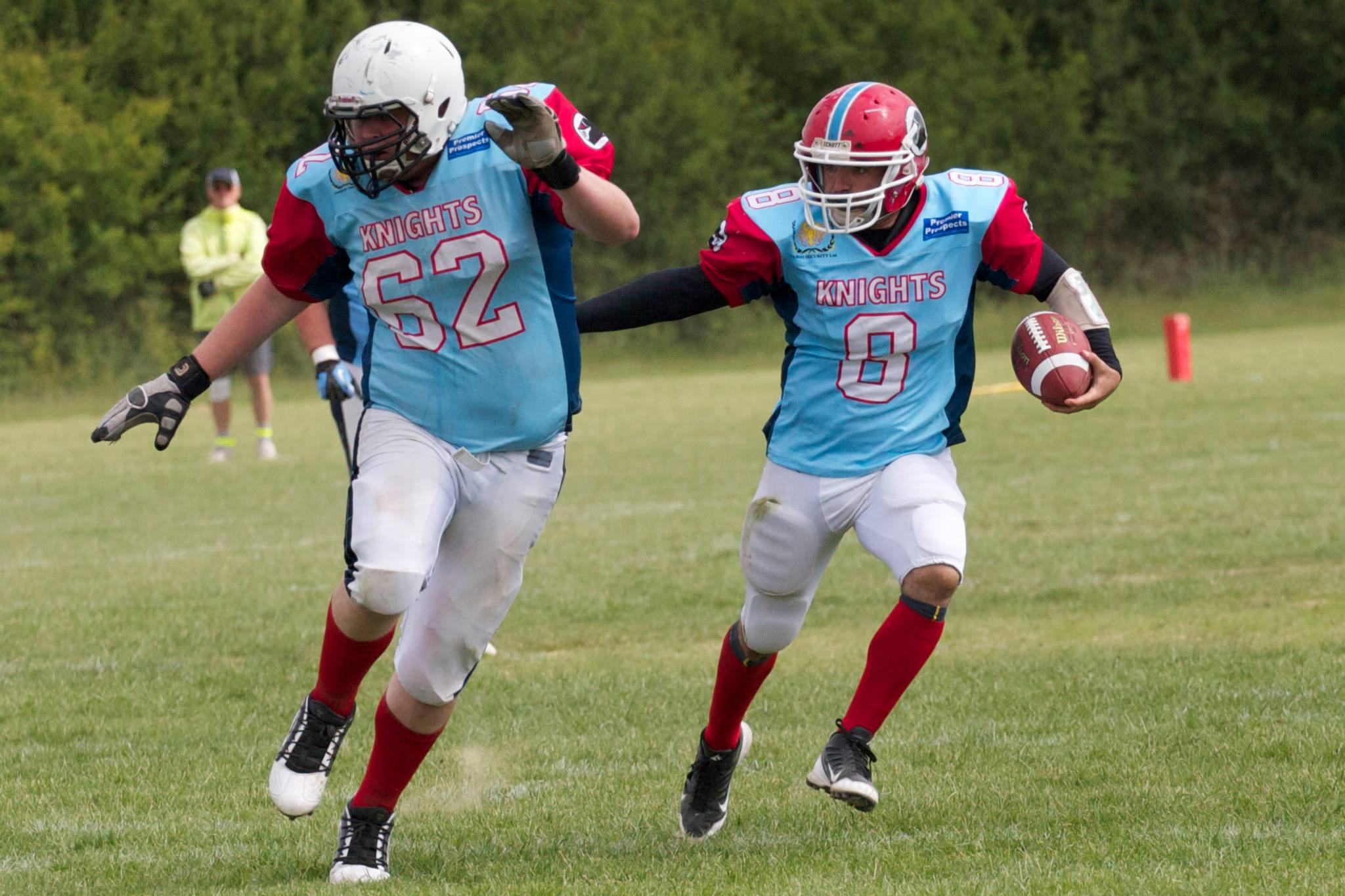
RB/FB, HC - Paul "Benny" Wakeford

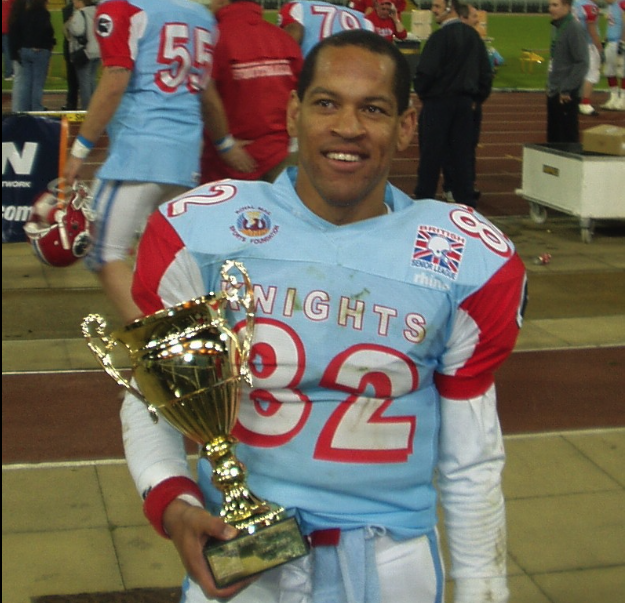
WR/DB - Jon Wyse

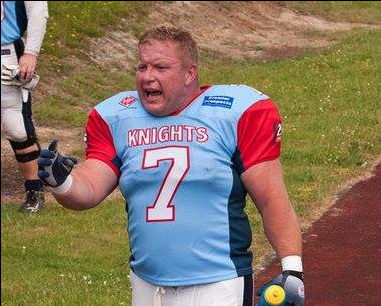
OL/DL - Dave Carpenter

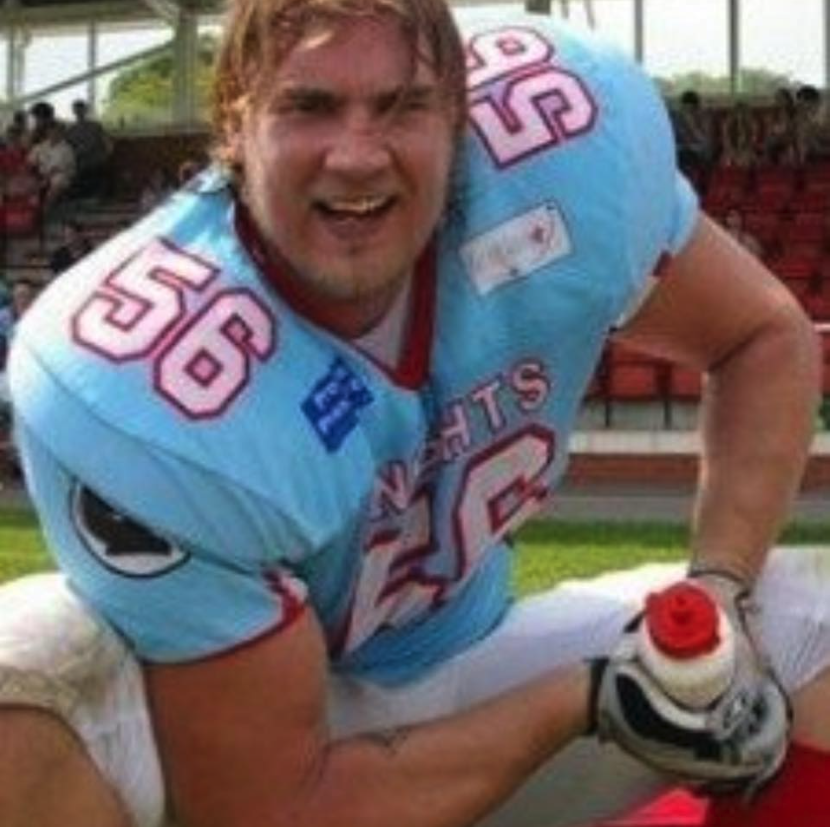
OL - Pete "Too Tall" Fields

Not Pictured:

- Sponsor – John Burrow
- OL – David Ferebee
- Position – Roger Hart
- DB – Clive Jacobs
- Position – Terry Milward
- Head Coach – Frank Snyder
- Supporter – Andy Soltysiak
- Supporter – Linda Soltysiak
- Coach – Graham Jessett
- Youth Manager – Christine Reeves
- Youth Manager – John Williams Sr.
- Kicker – Phil Alexander
- RB – Adedayo Ashaye
- Position – Bill Baker
- OL – Paul "Bubba" Biscombe
- DB – Jay Cashman
- WR – Harvey Culver
- Position – Mick Clancy
- Position – Gary Edwards
- RB – Kingsley Ejiogu
- Position – Alan Finlay
- Position – Rich Foster
- RB – Gareth Davies
- LB – Steve Harrison
- QB – Ashley Heath
- QB – Adam Heirons
- LB – Stephen Hollingdale
- Position – Troy Lee
- TE – Kenny Lettman
- LB – Jez McLees
- DB – Chris McIver
- Position – Peter Oliver
- Position – Michael Reeves
- RB – Duncan Reynolds
- DB – Cameron Saylor
- OL – Paul Setterfield
- RB – Keith Jacobs
- RB – Keith Theobald
- LB – Stuart Timms
- Position – Paul Westwood
- LB – Stephen Whittaker
- WR – Jon Williams Jr.

== Notable players ==
Olympic sprinter Dwain Chambers, 2006.
