= British American Football League =

UK sports league

- Sport: American football
- Founded: 1987
- Folded: 2010
- No. of teams: 50 (across three divisions)
- Country: United Kingdom
- Last champion: London Blitz

The British American Football League (BAFL) was the United Kingdom's primary American football league from 1998 until 2010. It was formerly known as the British Senior League (BSL) until 2005. BAFL was the trading name for Gridiron Football League Ltd incorporated as a Company limited by guarantee. Registration number: 2353839. The company went into administration on 1 April 2010, and the company ceased to trade as from this date.

The League had 3 divisions: Premier, 1 and 2, each with a playoff series and championship game to determine a winner. The Championship participants were promoted to the divisions above and the lowest-ranking teams in each division are relegated. Only clubs from England, Scotland and Wales played; clubs in Northern Ireland competed against Republic of Ireland clubs in an all-Ireland Irish American Football League.

Teams competed annually to reach the championship game (BritBowl) and win the Boston Trophy. The game was traditionally hosted at Sheffield's Don Valley Stadium, however the venue for the finals was switched in 2008 because of a schedule conflict with Rotherham United FC, the stadium's temporary tenants, with the match instead being played at the Keepmoat Stadium in Doncaster.

Tensions grew between the directors of BAFL and those of the British American Football Association, the governing body throughout 2009 and at the beginning of 2010, BAFL formally, but unconstitutionally, withdrew from BAFA. This led to uproar from the teams within BAFL, ultimately signalling the end for BAFL as an entity. The league ceased operations on 1 April 2010. The league was replaced by the BAFA Community Leagues for the 2010 season. This organisation, run under the umbrella of the governing body, rebranded in 2011 to become the BAFA National Leagues.

== Britbowl champions ==
- 2010 London Blitz
- 2009 London Blitz
- 2008 Coventry Cassidy Jets
- 2007 London Blitz
- 2006 London Olympians
- 2005 London O's
- 2004 Farnham Knights
- 2003 London O's
- 2002 London O's
- 2001 London O's
- 2000 London O's
- 1999 London O's
- 1998 London O's
- 1997 Redbridge Fire
- 1996 Leicester Panthers
- 1995 Birmingham Bulls
- 1994 London O's
- 1993 London O's
- 1992 London O's
- 1991 Birmingham Bulls
- 1990 Manchester Spartans
- 1989 Manchester Spartans
