= London Olympians =

American football team based in the UK

- Founded: 1983; 43 years ago
- League: BAFA National Leagues
- Division: Division 1
- Team history: Streatham Olympians (1983–1988); London Olympians (1988–1995, 2009–); London O's (1995–2005)
- Location: Greenwich, London
- Stadium: Well Hall
- Colours: White Helmets, White and Maroon Jerseys, Maroon Pants
- Head coach: Riq Ayub
- General manager: Gary Whitfield
- Division titles: 18: 1985, 1986, 1991, 1992, 1993, 1994, 1995, 1997, 1998, 1999, 2000, 2001, 2002, 2003, 2004, 2005, 2006, 2017
- Playoff berths: 18: 1985, 1986, 1991, 1992, 1993, 1994, 1995, 1997, 1998, 1999, 2000, 2001, 2002, 2003, 2004, 2005, 2006, 2017
- BritBowl titles: 12: 1992, 1993, 1994, 1997, 1998, 1999, 2000, 2001, 2002, 2003, 2005, 2006
- EuroBowl titles: 2: 1993, 1994
- EFAF Cup titles: 1: 1999
- Website: www.londonolympians.com

The London Olympians are an American football team based in Greenwich, London, England, who compete in Division 1, the 2nd tier of British American football. Formed in 1983 and originally from Streatham the team were known as the Streatham Olympians until 1988 when they were renamed London Olympians, by the then owner Peter Erotokritos. In 1995 the club changed its name once more to the London O's before becoming the Olympians again in 2009.

The Olympians are the most successful British American football team and are Twelve-time BritBowl champions, winning all twelve over a dominant 14-year period from 1992 until 2006. They are also eighteen-time Divisional champions and have won three major European competitions, the Eurobowl in 1993 and 1994 and the EFAF Cup in 1999. In 2016, The Olympians were relegated from the Premier Division but bounced back the following year by winning the SFC 1 South and earning promotion despite losing the Division 1 Bowl to the Manchester Titans. The Olympians hold the record for the longest winning streak in senior kitted British American football by winning every game they played in from 1998 until 2004.

== History ==
The Olympians' first home was on Streatham Common and was founded by Peter Erotokritos, his business partner John Carney who owned the nearby Olympians Gym.

Between 1995 and 2005 the Olympians were known as the London O's and regularly won the BritBowl Championship. The name change was a result of the previous owner retaining the rights to the Olympian name when he decided to withdraw from American football.

In 2009 the team returned to the BAFA league after a year in hiatus, playing in Division 2 East. They were promoted from Division 2 at the end of the 2010 season, defeating the Manchester Titans in the Division 2 Bowl game 35–13. They played and won all 15 of their games in 2010, scoring 553 and conceding just 60 points.

In 2012, the Olympians returned to the Premier division. The same year they left Crystal Palace for Catford and then for Beckenham the following season. In 2015, they played home games on Peckham Rye before moving north of the Thames for the first time in 2016, playing at East London Rugby Club in West Ham.

In 2016 season the Olympians went 0–10 and got relegated down to division for the 2017 season, In 2017 the Olympians went 6–3–1 to win the Division 1 South east conference and went on to beat Solent Thrashers 55–29 in the playoffs. Then beating the Kent Exiles 41–17 in the semi-finals and being promoted back to the premiership 1 year removed. But the Olympians came up short in the Finals against Manchester Titans as they lost 46–23.

== Stadium ==
Over the years they have played at the Crystal Palace National Sport Centre, Herne Hill velodrome, Southwark Park as well as in Beckenham, Catford, Peckham, West Ham and now at Eltham Well Hall. The team's training facility is in Rotherhithe

== Honours ==
Eurobowl Champions: 1993, 1994
EFAF Cup Champions: 1999
British Champions: 1992, 1993, 1994, 1997, 1998, 1999, 2000, 2001, 2002, 2003, 2005, 2006
BAFACL Division II South Champions: 2010 BAFACL Division II Play-Off Champions: 2010
