= Cornwall Monarchs =

American football team in the UK

- Established: 2005
- Based in: Redruth, Cornwall
- Home stadium: Illogan Park
- League: BAFA National Leagues
- Division: SFC West 2

Personnel
- Head coach: Richard Atkinson

Championships
- League titles (0): None
- Division titles (0): None

Current uniform
Home

Away

The Cornwall Monarchs are an American football team currently competing BAFA National Leagues South West. They play their home games at Illogan Park Redruth, Cornwall.

== Background ==
The club was formed in 2005 as the Cornish Sharks and In their first season in the BAFL, the Sharks recorded a 7 wins to 3 losses record and finished second in their conference, but lost their playoff quarter-final to the eventual divisional champions, the Norwich Devils. Head Coach Brian Smallworth stepped down from the Cornish Sharks for personal reasons in September 2019 and the club reformed as Cornwall Monarchs, based at Newquay Sports Centre for the 2020 season.

== History ==
The Cornish Sharks were founded in 2005 by Brian Smallworth, Richard Atkinson and Martin Phillips, all of whom were experienced players or coaches looking to bring American football back to Cornwall after the demise of the county's only other team the Duchy Destroyers, who had folded some eleven years earlier. After placing adverts in the local press, they held their first trials in January 2006 which was attended by over 140 people, a mixture of local rookies, rugby players, former players, and American servicemen stationed at a local air force base, one of whom had had previous experience with the San Francisco 49ers.

After obtaining kit from the Duchy Destroyers, the London Mets (one of Brian John Smallworth's former teams), a National Lottery grant, and sponsorship from 13 local businesses, the Sharks set about gaining entry into the British American Football League in time for the 2007 season. To do this, they arranged two away fixtures against teams already affiliated with the League, namely Reading and Lincoln, and they won both games convincingly without conceding a single point.

The team were accepted into the South West conference of Division 2. Despite an opening day defeat to the Andover Thrashers, they soon bounced back with three wins, including two consecutive shutouts. They eventually finished with a 7-3 record, tied with the Thrashers, but were awarded second place by virtue of having scored more points in the teams' two meetings during the regular season.

In doing so, they made British American football history by becoming the first team to qualify for the playoffs in their first ever season. They also finished the regular season by only contending 66 points in their ten games, a record for a new team and a defensive record bettered by only four other teams in the entire league.

In their playoff quarter-final, they faced an away trip to the Norwich Devils, who had won their conference with a perfect 10-0 record, and despite a brave performance they went down 18–26 to the eventual divisional champions. On 1/15/2010 the Sharks signed linebacker Jonathan Borrero and wide receiver James Dean both from Miami Fl,(US).They are two players that should make the Sharks a better team overall on both sides of the ball.

=== Senior team season records ===
Season	Division	W	L	T	PF	PA	Final position	Playoff record	Notes
2007	BAFL Division 2 South West	7	3	0	177	66	2 / 5	Lost 18–26 to Norwich Devils in quarter-final.	First team in BAFL history to qualify for playoffs in rookie year. Best defensive record for a rookie team.
2008	BAFL Division 2 South West	7	3	0	155	66	2 / 5	Beat Peterborough Saxons 9–6 in wild-card playoff. Lost 3–42 London Cobras in quarter-final.	—
2009	BAFL Division Two South West	7	2	1	295	65	2 / 5	—	Record includes one win by forfeit.
2010	BAFL Division Two South West	5	5	0	202	136	3 / 6		
2011	BAFL Division 2 South West	6	4	0	256	159	3 / 6		
2012	BAFL Division 2 South West	7	3	0	242	42	2 / 5	Lost 33–6 to Peterborough Saxons in quarter-final.	

== Other teams and activities ==
In 2008, the club established the Cornish Academy of American football, a programme aimed at offering youngsters in Cornwall a chance to gain experience in the sport. The academy is composed of twelve teams based all over Cornwall split into three divisions of four teams. The best players from each team will then be selected to play for "Team Cornwall" which will then play in the National League against other youngsters. When a player reaches 18 years of age he can then move up to the Cornish Sharks development team and when ready, can move into the Cornish Sharks.

The club also operates a Player Exchange Programme in action with two international teams, namely the Tacoma Invaders in Washington, USA and the Brisbane Rhinos in Australia.

In 2014, the club's u17 academy team finished 3rd at the youth, junior and flag Britbowl finals.
