= Britbowl =

- Organiser(s): British American Football Association
- Founded: 1985; 41 years ago
- Region: England; Scotland
- Teams: 10 (2019)
- Qualifier for: IFAF Europe Champions League
- Current champions: Bristol Aztecs
- Most championships: London Warriors (7 Titles)
- Broadcaster: BBC Sport (2019)

The Britbowl is the championship game of the British American Football National League, and formerly the British American Football League (BAFL) in the United Kingdom. It is the most prestigious of the league's three bowl games that constitute Britbowl Weekend. Only teams in the Premier Division of BAFL are eligible to compete in Britbowl. To progress to a Britbowl the winner of the seasonal BAFA Premier Division South will play the Runner up of the Premier North and vice versa in a semi-finals with the two winners eventually meeting in a final. Teams who play in the second and third levels compete for promotion in their own Championship Bowl games.

To mark its 20th anniversary, Roman numerals were introduced to identify the game. The 2006 Championship became known as Britbowl XX. The previous nineteen bowl games were redesignated as Britbowl I to Britbowl XIX respectively.

Since Britbowl XX the winning team has been presented with the Boston Trophy. The current champions are the Bristol Aztecs, who beat the Manchester Titans 49–10 in Britbowl XXXVIII on 6 September 2026.

== National League - Championship Games ==
Key
Designated National Championship Game but not given title of "Britbowl"

Bowl Name	Year	Date	Winners	Score	Runners-up	Venue	MVP	Referee
Britbowl XXXVIII	2026	6 September 2026	Bristol Aztecs	49-10	Manchester Titans	Nick Newbold Stadium, Coventry	Josh Breece	James Ford-Bannister
Britbowl XXXVII	2025	7 September 2025	Bristol Aztecs	27–24	London Warriors	Nick Newbold Stadium, Coventry	Ethan Gretzinger	Ollie Maskell
Britbowl XXXVI	2024	8 September 2024	London Warriors	31–10	Bristol Aztecs	Nick Newbold Stadium, Coventry	Andy Owusu	Brian Yates
Britbowl XXXV	2023	17 September 2023	Manchester Titans	44–27	London Warriors	Nick Newbold Stadium, Coventry	Sam Bloomfield	Pete Parsons
Britbowl XXXIV	2022	3 September 2022	Manchester Titans	37–7	London Warriors	New River Stadium, London	Sam Bloomfield	Brian Yates
Britbowl XXXIII	2019	1 September 2019	London Warriors	56–29	Tamworth Phoenix	New River Stadium, London	Dwayne Watson	Brian Yates
Britbowl XXXII	2018	8 September 2018	London Warriors	48–34	Tamworth Phoenix	John Charles Centre for Sport, Leeds	Raymond Sobowale	Keith Wickham
Britbowl XXXI	2017	26 August 2017	Tamworth Phoenix	34–28	London Blitz	Sixways Stadium, Worcester	Patrick Daley	Brian Yates
Britbowl XXX	2016	27 August 2016	London Warriors	36–15	London Blitz	Sixways Stadium, Worcester	Dwayne Watson	Jim Briggs
Britbowl XXIX	2015	5 September 2015	London Warriors	20–19	London Blitz	Allianz Park, London	Ian Jacquet	Brian Yates
Britbowl XXVIII	2014	14 September 2014	London Warriors	10–8	London Blitz	John Charles Centre for Sport, Leeds	Samuel Obi	Keith Wickham
Britbowl XXVII	2013	5 October 2013	London Warriors	26–23	London Blitz	John Charles Centre for Sport, Leeds	Romaine Jackson	Brian Yates
Britbowl XXVI	2012	26 August 2012	London Blitz	37–21	London Warriors	Don Valley Stadium, Sheffield	Fred Boyle	Brian Yates
Britbowl XXV	2011	24 September 2011	London Blitz	18–0	London Warriors	Crystal Palace National Sports Centre, London	Fred Boyle	Brian Yates
Britbowl XXIV	2010	18 September 2010	London Blitz	34–20	Coventry Cassidy Jets	Sixways Stadium, Worcester	Pete Sochart	Les Connor
Britbowl XXIII	2009	27 September 2009	London Blitz	26–7	Coventry Cassidy Jets	Keepmoat Stadium, Doncaster	Gareth Dauley	Les Connor
Britbowl XXII	2008	21 September 2008	Coventry Cassidy Jets	33–32	London Blitz	Keepmoat Stadium, Doncaster	Dax Michelena	Brian Yates
Britbowl XXI	2007	23 September 2007	London Blitz	14–6	Coventry Cassidy Jets	Don Valley Stadium, Sheffield	Lennox Johnson	Brian Yates
Britbowl XX	2006	24 September 2006	London Olympians	45–30	London Blitz	Don Valley Stadium, Sheffield	Michael Andrew	Keith Wickham
BSL Division 1 Bowl	2005	25 September 2005	London O's	21–19	Personal Assurance Knights	Don Valley Stadium, Sheffield	Jermaine Allen	Jim Briggs
BSL Division 1 Bowl	2004	26 September 2004	Personal Assurance Knights	28–14	London O's	Don Valley Stadium, Sheffield	Jon Wyse	Brian Yates
BSL Division 1 Bowl	2003	31 August 2003	London O's	35–7	East Kilbride Pirates	Don Valley Stadium, Sheffield	Warren Keen	Mike Cavanagh
BSL Division 1 Bowl	2002	1 September 2002	London O's	42–15	Personal Assurance Knights	Don Valley Stadium, Sheffield	Clive Palumbo	Keith Wickham
BSL Division 1 Bowl	2001	9 September 2001	London O's	37–20	East Kilbride Pirates	Don Valley Stadium, Sheffield	Stuart Franklin	Keith Wickham
BSL Division 1 Bowl	2000	6 September 2000	London O's	34–26	Birmingham Bulls	Don Valley Stadium, Sheffield	Shola Goppy	Keith Wickham
BAFA Senior League Division 1	1999	15 August 1999	London O's	9–6	Birmingham Bulls	Saffron Lane Stadium, Leicester	Justin Oke	Roger Stangroom
BAFA Senior League Division 1	1998	30 August 1998	London O's	20–0	Sussex Thunder	Saffron Lane Stadium, Leicester	Francis Hatega	Brian Yates
Big-C Final	1997	10 August 1997	London O's	26–20 (OT)	Milton Keynes Pioneers	National Hockey Stadium, Milton Keynes	Clive Palumbo	Brian Yates
BAFA Division 1	1996	25 August 1996	Leicester Panthers	10–6	Milton Keynes Pioneers	Saffron Lane Stadium, Leicester	Benny Benstead	Ian Papworth
BAFA Division 1	1995	29 July 1995	Birmingham Bulls	34–30	London Olympians	Norman Green Stadium, Solihull	John Riggs	Dave Allen
BAFA Division 1	1994	14 August 1994	London Olympians	24–23	Birmingham Bulls	Saffron Lane Stadium, Leicester		Jim Briggs
NDMA Final	1993	1 August 1993	London Olympians	40–14	Glasgow Lions	Maidenhead Rugby Club, Maidenhead	Richard Dunkley	Joe Mendell
NDMA Coke Bowl III	1992	10 August 1992	London Olympians	34–6	Leicester Panthers	Alexander Stadium, Birmingham	Dave Samuels	Brian Yates
NDMA Coke Bowl II	1991	4 August 1991	Birmingham Bulls	39–38	London Olympians	Alexander Stadium, Birmingham	Paul Roberts	Jim Briggs
NDMA Coke Bowl I	1990	4 August 1990	Manchester Spartans	27–25	Northants Storm	Crystal Palace Sports Centre, London	Johnny Atlas	Dave Norton
Bud Bowl IV	1989	6 August 1989	Manchester Spartans	21–14	Birmingham Bulls	Crystal Palace Sports Centre, London	Paul Bailey	Bill Bowsher
Bud Bowl III	1988	4 September 1988	Birmingham Bulls	30–6	London Olympians	Loftus Road, London	Greg Harris	Brian Yates
Bud Bowl II	1987	20 September 1987	London Ravens	40–23	Manchester All-Stars	Loftus Road, London	Ron Roberts Jr	Neil Surman
BAFL Summerbowl II	1986	7 September 1986	Birmingham Bulls	23–2	Glasgow Lions	Alexander Stadium, Birmingham	Lloyd Queen	Bill Bowsher
Bud Bowl I	1986	31 August 1986	London Ravens	20–12	Streatham Olympians	Saffron Lane Stadium, Leicester	Mike Duncan	Chris Bowker
AFL Summerbowl I	1985	26 August 1985	London Ravens	45–7	Streatham Olympians	Villa Park, Birmingham	Joe St. Louis	Mark Bridgham

Sources: BAFRA All-Time Bowl Crews List / britbowlnow.co.uk results lists

== Other Senior Bowl Games ==
Key
Designated "Britbowl" but not given title of Official National Championship Game.

Year	Bowl Name	Winners	Score	Runners-up	Venue	MVP	Referee
1985	BAFF	Rockingham Rebels	13-0	Croydon Coyotes			Harold Speed
1985	UKAFA	Slough Silverbacks	44-32	Swindon Steelers			
1985	AAFC	Locomotive Derby	42-21	Leigh Razorbacks			
1986	AAFC Steelbowl	Scunthorpe Steelers	50-32	Wirral Wolves	Quibell Park, Scunthorpe		Mike Berridge
1987	Budweiser Premier	Bournemouth Bobcats	43-6	Leeds Cougars	Ninian Park, Cardiff		Richard Prattley
1987	Budweiser Division 1	Ashton Oilers	27-7	Ealing Eagles	Vale Park, Stoke-on-Trent		Gordon Lucas
1987	UKAFL Steelbowl	Birmingham Bulls		Manchester Spartans	Alexander Stadium, Birmingham		Jon Cole
1987	UKAFL	St Helens Cardinals	28-26	Ipswich Cardinals	Alexander Stadium, Birmingham		
1987	BNGL Britbowl I	Mersey Centurions	20–16	Leicester Huntsmen	Saffron Lane Stadium, Leicester	Jeffrey Kelly	
1988	Budweiser Premier	Colchester Gladiators	47-28	Brighton B52s	Alexander Stadium, Birmingham		Bob Dudley
1988	Budweiser Division 1	Herts Phantoms	48-34	Ipswich Cardinals	Alexander Stadium, Birmingham		Tony Chetwood
1988	BNGL Britbowl II	Woking Generals	20-14	Mersey Centurions	Saffron Lane Stadium, Leicester		Robert Banks
1988	UKAFL Steelbowl						John Carter
1989	BNGL National	Norwich Devils	18-9	Ipswich Cardinals	Moorways Stadium, Derby		Mike Fenton
1989	BNGL Premier	Kingston Thames Pirates	66-8	Redditch Arrows	Moorways Stadium, Derby		Glyn Lovelock
1989	BNGL Division 1	Rugby Rollers	27-23	Duchy Destroyers	Saffron Lane stadium leicester		Tom Begg
1989	CGL Crown	Walsall Titans	60-47	Portsmouth Warriors	Alexander Stadium, Birmingham		Jon Carter
1989	CGL Duke	Medway Mustangs	44-12	Manchester Heros	Alexander Stadium, Birmingham		Robert Friel
1989	CGL Baron	Cheltenham Chieftains	12-11	Severn Vale Royals	Alexander Stadium, Birmingham		Charles Dean-Young
1990	BNGL National	Ipswich Cardinals	34–22	Clydesdale Colts	Saffron Lane Stadium, Leicester		Don Holden
1990	BNGL Premier	Duchy Destroyers	31-19	Cumbria Cougars	Saffron Lane Stadium, Leicester		Brian Craven
1990	BNGL Division 1	Barnsley Bears	40-34	Orpington Barracuda	Saffron Lane Stadium, Leicester		Con Horgan
1990	NCMMA	London Capitals	31-8	Essex Buccaneers			Bev Evans
1991	BNGL National	London Capitals	52–7	Clydesdale Colts	Saffron Lane Stadium, Leicester		Con Horgan
1991	BNGL Premier	Plymouth Admirals	26-16	Sutton Coldfield Admirals	Saffron Lane Stadium, Leicester		Mike Berridge
1991	BNGL Division 1	Glasgow Cyclones	30-22	Basildon Chiefs	Saffron Lane Stadium, Leicester		John West
1991	NDMA Division 2	Coventry Jaguars	50-28	Cardiff Mets	Saffron Lane Stadium, Leicester		John Slavin
1992	Coca Cola Division 2	Glasgow Lions		Kent Mustangs			Bev Evans
1992	BNGL National	Clydesdale Colts	30–26	DeLonghi Farnham Knights	Saffron Lane Stadium, Leicester		Robert Friel
1992	BNGL Premier	Merseyside Nighthawks	23-20	Crawley Raiders	Saffron Lane Stadium, Leicester		Con Horgan
1992	BNGL Division 1	Tiptree Titans	20-6	Bath Gladiators	Saffron Lane Stadium, Leicester		Richard Jeffrey-Cook
1993	BNGL National	Bournemouth Buccaneers	42–34	Bedford Bombardiers	Saffron Lane Stadium, Leicester		Phil Cottier
1993	BNGL Premier	Tiptree Titans	17-6	Croydon Kings	Saffron Lane Stadium, Leicester		Mike Fenton
1993	BNGL Division 1	Lincoln Saints	51-14	Redbridge Fire	Saffron Lane Stadium, Leicester		Gordon Dedman
1994	BAFA Division 2	Milton Keynes Pioneers	18-6	Bedford Bombardiers	Saffron Lane Stadium, Leicester		Charles Dean-Young
1994	BAFA Division 3	Cambridge Cats	25-14	Crawley Raiders	Saffron Lane Stadium, Leicester		Con Horgan
1994	BAFA Division 4	London Olympians 2	48-6	Trent Valley Warriors	Saffron Lane Stadium, Leicester		Doug Brown
1995	BAFA Division 2	Cambridge Cats	28-13	Plymouth Admirals	Norman Green Stadium, Solihull		John Slavin
1995	BAFA Division 3	Oxford Saints	14-6	Gwent Mustangs	Norman Green Stadium, Solihull		Phil Cottier
1995	Scottish Gridiron Association	Glasgow Lions	76-0	Granite City Oilers			
1996	BAFA Division 2	London O's	32-7	Birmingham Bulls	Saffron Lane Stadium, Leicester		Tim Vickers
1996	BAFA Division 3	Winchester Rifles	48-0	Redditch Arrows	Saffron Lane Stadium, Leicester		Dave Allen
1996	Scottish Gridiron Association	Glasgow Lions		Stirling Broncos			
1997	BAFA Division 1	Redbridge Fire	26-7	Nottingham Caesars	Saffron Lane Stadium, Leicester		Paul Coppin
1997	BAFA Division 2	Bristol Aztecs	27-6	Chiltern Cheetahs			
1997	Scottish Gridiron Association	East Kilbride Pirates	24-6	Dundee Whalers	Caird Park, Dundee		Simon Cowie
1998	BSL Division 2	Southern Sundevils	22-16	Lancashire Wolverines	Saffron Lane Stadium, Leicester		Ian Papworth
1998	Scottish Gridiron Association	East Kilbride Pirates	50-6	Dundee Whalers			
1999	BSL Division 1	Gateshead Senators	7-2	Bristol Aztecs	Saffron Lane Stadium, Leicester		Kevin Holt
1999	BSL Division 2	Chester Romans	24-22	Tiger Bay Warriors			
2000	BSL Division 2	PA Knights	41-7	Ipswich Cardinals	Don Valley Stadium, Sheffield		Kevin Holt
2001	BSL Division 2	Ipswich Cardinals	47-15	Norwich Devils	Don Valley Stadium, Sheffield		Tzvi Lindeman
2002	BSL Division 2	Norwich Devils	17-14	Yorkshire Rams	Don Valley Stadium, Sheffield		Jim Briggs
2003	BSL Division 2	Bristol Aztecs	32-15	Nottingham Caesars	Don Valley Stadium, Sheffield	Kenny Saro	Pete Thom
2004	BSL Division 1A	Southern Sundevils	32-0	Bristol Aztecs	Don Valley Stadium, Sheffield		Mike Cavanagh
2004	BSL Division 2	Doncaster Mustangs	32-16	Chiltern Cheetahs	Don Valley Stadium, Sheffield		
2005	BAFL Division 1A	Bristol Aztecs	7-0	Chiltern Cheetahs	Don Valley Stadium, Sheffield	Adam Sparrow	Keith Wickham
2005	BAFL Division 2	Coventry Jets	30-26	Kent Exiles	Don Valley Stadium, Sheffield		Les Connor
2006	BAFL Division 1A	Coventry Cassidy Jets	52-20	Bristol Aztecs	Don Valley Stadium, Sheffield		Jeff Bloszies
2006	BAFL Division 2	Oxford Saints	29-28	West Coast Trojans	Don Valley Stadium, Sheffield		Roger Stangroom
2007	BAFL Division 1	Farnham Knights	47-7	Ipswich Cardinals	Don Valley Stadium, Sheffield		Jim Briggs
2007	BAFL Division 2	Norwich Devils	26-12	Dundee Hurricanes	Don Valley Stadium, Sheffield		Charles Dean-Young
2008	BAFL Division 1	Sussex Thunder	20-18	Redditch Arrows	Keepmoat Stadium, Doncaster		Keith Wickham
2008	BAFL Division 2	London Cobras	30-6	Tamworth Phoenix	Keepmoat Stadium, Doncaster		Les Connor
2009	BAFL Division 1	London Cobras	8-0	East Kilbride Pirates	Keepmoat Stadium, Doncaster		Brian Yates
2009	BAFL Division 2	Leicester Falcons	33-32	Colchester Gladiators	Keepmoat Stadium, Doncaster		Tim Vickers
2010	BAFACL Division 1	Tamworth Phoenix	35-14	East Kilbride Pirates	Sixways Stadium, Worcester		Keith Wickham
2010	BAFACL Division 2	London Olympians	35-13	Manchester Titans	Sixways Stadium, Worcester		Ian Wainwright
2011	BAFACL Division 1	East Kilbride Pirates	62-23	Leicester Falcons	Crystal Palace National Sports Centre, London		Mike Cavanagh
2011	BAFACL Division 2	South Wales Warriors	48-20	West Coast Trojans	Crystal Palace National Sports Centre, London		Dan Bridgland
2012	BAFANL Division 1	Sussex Thunder	10-7	West Coast Trojans	Don Valley Stadium, Sheffield		Dean Wright
2012	BAFANL Division 2	Sheffield Predators	39-33 (OT)	Peterborough Saxons	Don Valley Stadium, Sheffield		Tim Ockendon
2013	BAFNL National	Colchester Gladiators	33-13	Gateshead Senators	John Charles Centre for Sport, Leeds		Ben Griffiths
2014	BAFNL National	Merseyside Nighthawks	41-34 (OT)	Edinburgh Wolves	John Charles Centre for Sport, Leeds		Ben Griffiths
2015	BAFNL National 1 North	Merseyside Nighthawks	27-13	Edinburgh Wolves	John Charles Centre for Sport, Leeds		Mike Cavanagh
2015	BAFNL National 1 South	Farnham Knights	38-27	Solent Thrashers	Leicester Road FC, Hinckley		Tim Ockendon
2015	BAFNL National 2 North	Sandwell Steelers	24-7	Peterborough Saxons	John Charles Centre for Sport, Leeds		Ben Griffiths
2015	BAFNL National 2 South	Bury Saints	47-12	Bristol Apache	Leicester Road FC, Hinckley		Keith Wickham
2016	BAFNL Division 1	Bury Saints	21-13	Edinburgh Wolves	John Charles Centre for Sport, Leeds		Brian Yates
2016	BAFNL Division 2 North	Leicester Falcons	36-0	Newcastle Vikings	John Charles Centre for Sport, Leeds		David Knight
2016	BAFNL Division 2 South	Oxford Saints	24-2	Cambridgeshire Cats	John Charles Centre for Sport, Leeds		Amir Brooks
2017	BAFNL Division 1	Manchester Titans	46-23	London Olympians	John Charles Centre for Sport, Leeds		Mike Cavanagh
2017	BAFNL Division 2 North	Shropshire Revolution	31-7	Glasgow Tigers	John Charles Centre for Sport, Leeds		David Knight
2017	BAFNL Division 2 South	Berkshire Renegades	20-17	Wembley Stallions	John Charles Centre for Sport, Leeds		Dan Holt
2018	BAFNL Division 1	Leicester Falcons	36-29	Kent Exiles	John Charles Centre for Sport, Leeds		Tim Ockendon
2018	BAFNL Division 2 North	Aberdeen Roughnecks	13-6 (OT)	Chester Romans	Druid Park, Newcastle-upon-Tyne		Amir Brooks
2018	BAFNL Division 2 South	Hertfordshire Cheetahs	24-7	Portsmouth Dreadnoughts	Leicester Road FC, Hinckley		Brian Yates
2019	BAFNL Division 1	Solent Thrashers	21-14	Sandwell Steelers	New River Stadium, London		Shawn Sombati
2019	BAFNL Division 2 North	Inverclyde Goliaths	36-27	Halton Spartans	Druid Park, Newcastle-upon-Tyne		Tim Vickers
2019	BAFNL Division 2 South	South Wales Warriors	13-0	Bournemouth Bobcats	New River Stadium, London		Tim Ockendon
2022	BAFNL Division 1	East Kilbride Pirates	50-12	Cambridgeshire Cats	New River Stadium, London	Neil Baptie	
2022	BAFNL Division 2	Bristol Apache	17-7	Highland Stags	New River Stadium, London	Fen Trudgian	
2023	BAFNL Division 1	Hertfordshire Cheetahs	27-21 (OT)	Newcastle Vikings	Butts Park Arena, Coventry	Hafeez Bisiriyu	
2023	BAFNL Division 2	East Kent Mavericks	55-14	Shropshire Revolution	Butts Park Arena, Coventry	John Ellender	
2024	BAFNL Division 1	Nottingham Caesars	49-9	Rushmoor Knights	Butts Park Arena, Coventry	Ben Harrison	
2024	BAFNL Division 2	Colchester Gladiators	14-0	Sandwell Steelers	Butts Park Arena, Coventry	Kieran Polley	
2026	BAFNL Division 1	East Kent Mavericks	26–0	Newcastle Vikings	Staffordshire Rugby Club, Staffordshire		
2026	BAFNL Division 2	Ipswitch Cardinals	32–14	Lancashire Buccaneers	Staffordshire Rugby Club, Staffordshire		

Sources: BAFRA All-Time Bowl Crews List / britbowlnow.co.uk results lists

== BAFA Division Championships ==
=== Lower Division Championships ===
Year	Bowl	Champion	Result (Opponent)	Venue
2012	Division 1	Sussex Thunder	Won 10-07 (West Coast Trojans)	Don Valley Stadium, Sheffield
2012	Division 2	Sheffield Predators	Won 39-33 OT (Peterborough Saxons)	Don Valley Stadium, Sheffield
2011	Division 1	East Kilbride Pirates	Won 62-23 (Leicester Falcons)	Crystal Palace National Athletics Stadium, London
2011	Division 2	South Wales Warriors	Won 48-20 (West Coast Trojans)	Crystal Palace National Athletics Stadium, London
2010	Division 1	Tamworth Phoenix	Won 35-14 (East Kilbride Pirates)	Sixways Stadium, Worcester
2010	Division 2	London Olympians	Won 35-13 (Manchester Titans)	Sixways Stadium, Worcester
2009	Division 1	London Cobras	Won 8-0 (East Kilbride Pirates)	Keepmoat Stadium, Doncaster
2009	Division 2	Leicester Falcons	Won 33-32 (Colchester Gladiators)	Keepmoat Stadium, Doncaster
2008	Division 1	Sussex Thunder	Won 20-18 4OT (Redditch Arrows)	Don Valley Stadium, Sheffield
2008	Division 2	London Cobras	Won 30-6 (Tamworth Phoenix)	Don Valley Stadium, Sheffield
2007	Division 1	Farnham MH Knights	Won 47-7 (Ipswich Cardinals)	Don Valley Stadium, Sheffield
2007	Division 2	Norwich Devils	Won 26-12 (Dundee Hurricanes)	Don Valley Stadium, Sheffield
2006	Division 1A	Coventry Cassidy Jets	Won 52-20 (Bristol Aztecs)	Don Valley Stadium, Sheffield
2006	Division 2	Dominos Oxford Saints	Won 29-28 (West Coast Trojans)	Don Valley Stadium, Sheffield
2005	Division 1A	Bristol Aztecs	Won 7-0 (Chiltern Cheetahs)	Don Valley Stadium, Sheffield
2005	Division 2	Coventry Jets	Won 30-26 (Kent Exiles)	Don Valley Stadium, Sheffield
2004	Division 1A	Southern Sundevils	Won 32-0 (Bristol Aztecs)	Don Valley Stadium, Sheffield
2004	Division 2	Doncaster Mustangs	Won 32-16 (Chiltern Cheetahs)	Don Valley Stadium, Sheffield
2003	Division 2	Bristol Aztecs	Won 32-15 (Nottingham Caesars)	Don Valley Stadium, Sheffield
2002	Division 2	Norwich Devils	Won 17-14 (ASAP Yorkshire Rams)	Don Valley Stadium, Sheffield
2001	Division 2	Ipswich Cardinals	Won 47-15 (Norwich Devils)	Don Valley Stadium, Sheffield
2000	Division 2	Personal Assurance Knights	Won 41-7 (Ipswich Cardinals)	Don Valley Stadium, Sheffield
1999	Division 1 (Regional)	Gateshead Senators	Won 7-2 (Bristol Aztecs)	Saffron Lane Stadium, Leicester
1999	Division 2	Chester Romans	Won 24-22 (Tiger Bay Warriors)	Saffron Lane Stadium, Leicester
1998	Division 2	Southern Sundevils	Won 22-16 (Lancashire Wolverines)	Saffron Lane Stadium, Leicester
1997	Division 2	Bristol Aztecs	Won 27-6 (Chiltern Cheetahs)	Saffron Lane Stadium, Leicester
1996	Division 2	London O's	Won 32-7 (Birmingham Bulls)	Saffron Lane Stadium, Leicester
1996	Division 3	Winchester Rifles	Won 48-0 (Redditch Arrows)	Saffron Lane Stadium, Leicester
1995	Division 2	Cambridge Cats	Won 28-14 (Plymouth Admirals)	Norman Green Stadium, Solihull
1995	Division 3	Oxford Saints	Won 14-6 (Gwent Mustangs)	Norman Green Stadium, Solihull
1994	Division 2	Milton Keynes Pioneers	Won 18-6 (Bedford Bombardiers)	Saffron Lane Stadium, Leicester
1994	Division 3	Cambridge Cats	Won 25-14 (Crawley Raiders)	Saffron Lane Stadium, Leicester
1994	Division 4	London Olympians II	Won 48-6 (Trent Valley Warriors)	Saffron Lane Stadium, Leicester
1993	Premier Division	Tiptree Titans	Won 17-9 (Croydon Kings)	Saffron Lane Stadium, Leicester
1993	First Division	Lincoln Saints	Won 51-14 (Redbridge Fire)	Saffron Lane Stadium, Leicester
1992	Premier Division	Merseyside Nighthawks	Won 23-20 (Crawley Raiders)	Saffron Lane Stadium, Leicester
1992	First Division	Tiptree Titans	Won 20-6 (Bath Gladiators)	Saffron Lane Stadium, Leicester
1991	Premier Division	Plymouth Admirals	Won 26-16 (Sutton Coalfield Royals)	Saffron Lane Stadium, Leicester
1991	First Division	Glasgow Cyclones	Won 30-21 (Basildon Chiefs)	Saffron Lane Stadium, Leicester
1990	Premier Division	Duchy Destroyers	Won 31-19 (Cumbria Cougars)	Saffron Lane Stadium, Leicester
1990	First Division	Barnsley Bears	Won 40-34 (Barracudas)	Saffron Lane Stadium, Leicester
1989	Premier Division	Kingston Thames Pirates	Won 66-8 (Redditch Arrows)	Moorways Stadium, Derby
1989	First Division	Rugby Rollers	Won 27-23 (Duchy Destroyers)	Moorways Stadium, Derby

Note:
There were no lower divisions prior to 1989

== BritBowl appearances ==
Num	Team	W	L	%	Notes
12	London Warriors	7	5	0.583	
12	London Blitz	5	7	0.417	
11	London Olympians	9	2	0.818	6 wins & 2 losses as London O's
4	Farnham MH Knights	1	3	0.250	1 win & 2 losses as Personal Assurance Knights
4	Coventry Cassidy Jets	1	3	0.250	
4	Birmingham Bulls	1	3	0.250	
3	Bristol Aztecs	2	1	0.666	
3	Clydesdale Colts	1	2	0.333	
3	Tamworth Phoenix	1	2	0.333	
3	Manchester Titans	2	1	0.666	
2	Ipswich Cardinals	1	1	0.500	
2	Mersey Centurions	1	1	0.500	
2	East Kilbride Pirates	0	2	0.000	

The following teams have 1 win from 1 appearance:
Bournemouth Buccaneers, Leicester Panthers, London Capitals, Norwich Devils, Redbridge Fire, Woking Generals

The following teams have 1 loss from 1 appearance:
Bedford Bombardiers, Leicester Huntsmen, Milton Keynes Pioneers, Nottingham Caesars, Sussex Thunder

=== Lower Division Championship Appearances ===
Num	Team	W	L	%	Notes
6	Bristol Aztecs	3	3	0.500	
3	Norwich Devils	2	1	0.667	
3	Ipswich Cardinals	1	2	0.333	
3	East Kilbride Pirates	1	2	0.333	
3	Chiltern Cheetahs	0	3	0.000	
2	Cambridge Cats	2	0	1.000	
2	Coventry Cassidy Jets	2	0	1.000	1 win as Coventry Jets
2	Farnham MH Knights	2	0	1.000	1 win as Personal Assurance Knights
2	London Olympians	2	0	1.000	1 win as London O's & 1 win as London Olympians II
2	Southern Sundevils	2	0	1.000	
2	Sussex Thunder	2	0	1.000	
2	Tiptree Titans	2	0	1.000	
2	Duchy Destroyers	1	1	0.500	
2	Plymouth Admirals	1	1	0.500	
2	Nottingham Caesars	1	1	0.500	
2	Crawley Raiders	0	2	0.000	
2	Redditch Arrows	0	2	0.000	

The following teams have 1 win from 1 appearance:
Barnsley Bears, Chester Romans, Doncaster Mustangs, Gateshead Senators, Glasgow Cyclones, Kingston Thames Pirates, Lincoln Saints, Merseyside Centurians, Milton Keynes Pioneers, Oxford Saints, Rugby Rollers, South Wales Warriors, Winchester Rifles

The following teams have 1 loss from 1 appearance:
ASAP Yorkshire Rams, Barracudas, Basildon Chiefs, Bath Gladiators, Bedford Bombardiers, Birmingham Bulls, Croydon Kings, Cumbria Cougars, Dundee Hurricanes, Gwent Mustangs, Kent Exiles, Lancashire Wolverines, Redbridge Fire, Sutton Coalfield Royals, Tiger Bay Warriors, Trent Valley Warriors

== See also ==
- British American Football League
- Boston Trophy
