= 2007 BAFL season =

The 2007 BAFL Season is the British American Football League. BritBowl XXI, the league's championship game, was scheduled to be played at Keepmoat Stadium in Doncaster on September 23, 2007.

== Schedule ==
=== Regular season ===
==== Formula ====
Based on the British American Football League, setup for the 2007 season there will be a 3 tier structure consisting of:

Division	Teams
BAFL Premier	8
BAFL 1 North	6
BAFL 1 South	6
BAFL 2 Central Conference	5
BAFL 2 North Conference	6
BAFL 2 South East Conference	5
BAFL 2 South West Conference	5

== Final regular season standings ==
W = Wins, L = Losses, T = Ties, PCT = Winning Percentage, PF= Points For, PA = Points Against

Clinched playoff seeds are marked in parentheses and shaded in green, for BAFL 2 divisions the colours have been changed to indicate Northern and Southern sides of the Playoffs.

=== BAFL Premier standings ===
BAFL Premier
Team	W	L	T	PCT	PF	PA
(1) London Blitz	9	0	1	9.500	259	74
(2) Coventry Cassidy Jets	9	1	0	0.900	412	120
(3) Bristol Aztecs	5	4	1	0.555	224	149
(4) London Olympians	5	4	1	0.555	151	95
Birmingham Bulls	3	6	1	0.350	86	214
Gateshead Senators	3	6	1	0.350	125	252
East Kilbride Pirates	3	6	1	0.350	38	172
Southern Sundevils	0	10	0	0.000	20	292

=== BAFL Division 1 standings ===
BAFL 1 - North
Team	W	L	T	PCT	PF	PA
(2) West Coast Trojans	9	1	0	0.900	291	56
(3) Redditch Arrows	8	2	0	0.800	200	51
Yorkshire Rams	6	4	3	0.600	152	106
Staffordshire Surge	5	5	0	0.500	132	125
Doncaster Mustangs	1	9	0	0.100	50	208
Chester Romans	1	9	0	0.100	37	209
BAFL 1 - South
Team	W	L	T	PCT	PF	PA
(1) Farnham Knights	10	0	0	1.000	468	89
(4) Ipswich Cardinals	8	2	0	0.800	230	109
Oxford Saints	6	4	0	0.600	220	220
Kent Exiles	3	7	0	0.300	92	259
Sussex Thunder	2	7	1	0.250	141	264
Sussex Thunder	0	9	1	0.050	51	283

== Playoffs ==
BritBowl XXI will then be played on September 23, 2007 at Don Valley Stadium, Sheffield

=== BAFL Premier Playoff ===
Seed	Teams
1	London Blitz
2	Coventry Cassidy Jets
3	Bristol Aztecs
4	London Olympians

==== BAFL Premier Championship Game/BritBowl ====
Semifinals			BritBowl
1	London Blitz	23
4	London Olympians	10	1	London Blitz	14
2	Coventry Cassidy Jets	13	2	Coventry Cassidy Jets	6
3	Bristol Aztecs	6

=== BAFL 1 Playoff ===
Seed	Teams
1	Farnham Knights
2	West Coast Trojans
3	Redditch Arrows
4	Ipswich Cardinals

==== BAFL 1 Championship Game ====
Semifinals			Championship Game
1	Farnham Knights	49
4	Redditch Arrows	14	1	Farnham Knights	47
2	West Coast Trojans	13	3	Ipswich Cardinals	7
3	Ipswich Cardinals	28

== See also ==
- BritBowl
