= British Youth American Football Association =

The British Youth American Football Association (BYAFA), was responsible for junior and youth American football within Britain, comprising both fully kitted and flag football. In 2007, the association was incorporated into the British American Football League. However, in Scotland, flag football went under the jurisdiction of the Scottish Flag Football Association, until this was also incorporated into the BAFL.

== Teams ==
=== Flag ===
==== Full members ====
- London Blitz
- Cinque-Port Monarchs
- Lancashire Wolverines Juniors
- Leicester Eagles
- London Lions
- Newport City Saints
- Nottingham Caesars
- Norwich Devils
- Sheffield Tomahawks
- Sussex Thunder
- Woodham Warriors
- Peterbourgh Saxons

==== Affiliate members ====
- Chester Romans
- Coventry Cassidy Jets
- East Kent Mavericks
- London Warriors
- South Wales Rebellion
- Studley Bearcats
- Kent Exiles

=== Youth tackle ===
==== Full members ====
- Bath Cardinals
- Bolton Bulldogs
- Bristol Aztecs
- Clyde Valley Hawks
- Chester Romans
- East Midlands Saxons
- Essex Spartans
- Farnham MH Knights
- Gateshead Senators
- Glasgow Tigers
- Solent Thrashers
- Tamworth Phoenix

==== Affiliate members ====
- Colchester Gladiators
- Dundee Storm
- East Kent Mavericks
- Fife Fire
- MK Pathfinders

=== Junior tackle ===
==== Full members ====
- Bath Bulldogs
- Clyde Valley Falcons
- Glasgow Tigers
- Inverness Blitz
- Kent Exiles
- Lancashire Wolverines Juniors
- Sheffield Tomahawks
- Solent Thrashers
- Sussex Thunder
- Milton Keynes City Pathfinders

==== Affiliate members ====
- Edinburgh Wolves
- Fife Fire
- London Blitz
- London Warriors
- Chester Romans
- Manchester Titans Juniors
- Norwich Devils
- Staffordshire Surge
- West Coast Trojans
