= Essex Tridents =

American football team based in the United Kingdom

Logo

General information
- Founded: 1998 (as Essex Spartans)
- Stadium: Thames Rugby Football Club
- Headquartered: South Ockendon

Personnel
- General manager: Raymond Towey
- Head coach: Seán Benton

Nickname
- The Black Tide

League / conference affiliations
- BAFA National Leagues; National League South Central

Championships
- League championships: 0; 15
- Division championships: 0 None

Current uniform
Home

Away

The Essex Tridents are an American football team based in Grays, Essex, England. The team played under the Spartans name since 1998 following a merger between two local teams and currently play in the BAFA National Leagues, Southern Football Conference 2 East. The club were formed as the Essex Spartans in 1998, and in 2023 they merged with local rivals East Essex Sabres.

== History ==
Able to trace its history back to 1989, the team has been playing under the Essex Spartans name since the close of the 1998 season when two local rival teams, the Essex Chiefs and the Redbridge Fire, decided to merge. After initial training sessions, the team's numbers were boosted by the demise of the Cambridge Cats (who later reformed).

As both the former teams had been competing at the same level in the British Senior League, the newly formed Spartans were granted a spot in the National Division (which was then the second of the league's three tiers). After winning six of their games (including shutouts against the Canada Life Cardinals and the London Mets, the Spartans finished second in their conference and so qualified for the playoffs. They defeated the Southern Sundevils in the quarter-final, but were finally beaten 19–33 away to the Gateshead Senators.

The 2000 season started badly with two consecutive defeats to the London Blitz, followed by a heavy defeat away to the London O's two matchdays later. In a season which saw the team lose 13 players through injury, the Spartans finished third from bottom of their group with a 2–6 record. However, some consolation was found in some individual player performances, with Steve Berlingo ending the season as the league's leader in interceptions, and Shulba Hunt finishing as the sixth highest rusher in the league.

The Spartans continued to struggle the following season. After five straight defeats (including a forfeited match) coupled with a number of injuries, a few players transferring to other teams and some US armed forces players from a nearby base unable to play, they were forced to withdraw halfway through the season and were realigned into Division Two for the next season.

2002 was a transitional year for the Spartans. The team moved back to the Chiefs' old home ground in Basildon, but their long-time star offensive player Shulba Hunt was forced to retire through injury. They finished eighth out of nine teams with a 3–6 record. In the 2003 preseason, the then head coach Dean Gibson and his new offensive coordinator Dave Thomas developed a new offensive playbook featuring an emphasis on short passing. This seemed to suit the squad and results improved, but fell short of expectations as the Spartans finished 5–4–1 and just missed out on the playoffs. 2004 saw the squad depleted by a number of retirements, and the Spartan's young players could only manage a 3–6–1 finish to the season.

However, 2005 saw the club's best season since they first entered the league. The coaching staff put an emphasis on developing the young squad into one full of multi-skilled positional players, and the team was bolstered by the arrival of a number of players from the recently folded Southend Sabres. After a winning regular season which included two comfortable wins over league newcomers Maidstone Pumas, they finished second in their group with a 5–2–1 record, enough to qualify for the playoffs. They were drawn away to the Oxford Saints, where they beaten 0–20.

2006 saw the Spartans reach the playoffs once again after finishing second with a 5–4–1 regular season record. They were originally drawn to face the South Wales Warriors in a wild-card playoff, and turned up at the Warriors' home field to play the match. However, they complained to BAFL (British American Football League) that the Warriors' pitch at Bedwas RFC was too short, and therefore did not comply with competition rules. After consultations between the two teams, the game was played as normal but BAFL decided afterwards that the Warriors would forfeit the game, and therefore the game was awarded to the Spartans as a 1–0 victory. In the quarter-finals, they were once again drawn away to the Oxford Saints and were again defeated by the eventual divisional champions. They unable to repeat their playoff run in 2007, finishing fourth out of six teams with a 3–7 regular season record.

A second poor season under head coach Dave Barham with the team finishing a lowly 1–8–1 saw Dean Gibson re-instated to the head coach position in 2009 (having previously served as head coach until 2007), returning with him was offensive co-ordinator Brendan Bride. This combination had brought success to the Spartans in previous years, their previous tenure ending with playoff appearances in both 2005 and 2006. Unfortunately the team was unable to improve on the previous season's mark and ended the 2009 season with an identical 1–8–1 record.

2010 proved to be a break-out season for the Essex Spartans. The close season 2009–2010 saw ex-Wisconsin Badgers and Detroit Lions star Cyrill Weems join the team firstly in an advisory capacity before taking over as head coach prior to the start of the 2010 season. Weems' influence and emphasis on work ethic brought about a complete culture change for the team both on and off the field. A young Essex side began the 2010 season with a renewed hope of bringing success back to the Essex franchise following a seemingly bleak period after their last playoff appearance in 2006. The Spartans finished the 2010 season with a 6 and 4 win–loss record, narrowly losing lost two close games to Bedfordshire and Norwich. This huge turnaround in fortune led to the team finishing second in the division behind eventual league champions the London Olympians rewarding them with a trip to the Hampshire Thrashers in the BAFACL Quarter finals. A hard-fought game eventually finished 29–15 to Hampshire, with the deciding score coming in the final few minutes.

Coach Cyrill Weems returned to the United States in July 2010, offensive coordinator Brendan Bride having departed the team in June 2010 due to personal circumstances. As such, a new coaching structure which would continue with the development of the program was required. On July 11, 2010, the team would announce Mark Saunders as head coach, with Spartan stalwart Seán Benton taking over as offensive coordinator. Also joining the coaching staff for the 2010 season and beyond were Kieron Goymer as offensive line coach, ex-Tiptree Titan and Chelmsford Cherokee speedster Wes Bourke as defensive backs coach, longtime Essex Spartan Craig Brittney as wide receivers coach and Anglia Ruskin Phantoms offensive coordinator Chris Hunt as offensive analyst.

2010 also saw general manager Tony Palmer celebrate 25 years running the club, and for his tireless work for the team over this period he was honoured with a special presentation of a squad signed helmet at the 2010 team awards evening. 2011 saw the Spartans continue to progress. Under the guidance of Saunders and his experienced and talented coaching staff, the Spartans improved on their 2010 record by ending the season with 7 wins, 2 losses and one tie. The team faced old rivals Kent Exiles in two closely fought contests following the Exiles relegation from Division One, an 18–18 tie at home and a narrow 24–20 loss away, with the game decided on the final play. The Spartans only other defeat came at the hands of the Watford Cheetahs, and as such, the team finished in second place in the division and qualified for the post-season for the second successive season.

The team travelled to Lancashire to face the Lancashire Wolverines in the first round of the playoffs. In an unseasonably cold August day, the Spartans were unlucky to see a punt-return for a touchdown called back by a penalty and lost the game 7–0.

As a reward for their vast improvements in both 2010 and 2011, the British American Football Association National League announced the Spartans would be promoted to Division One for the 2012 campaign. The step up proved to be too much of a challenge for the team, who collected only one victory against 9 losses to finish bottom of the table.

With the British American Football Association re-aligning the Divisions for the 2013 season, the Spartans were placed in the National League, alongside the Kent Exiles, Colchester Gladiators, Bedfordshire Blue Raiders, Maidstone Pumas, Watford Cheetahs, and Milton Keynes Pathfinders. A second consecutive 1–9 record was the result in a tough division, the team's only win coming against the Maidstone Pumas. At the end of the 2013 season, Head Coach Marc Saunders stepped down and was replaced by former assistant head coach and Spartan Hall of Fame member Seán Benton.

In late 2023, following relegation from the SFC1 East, the Essex Spartans identity was sunsetted and the club was reborn as the Essex Tridents following a merger with local team the East Essex Sabres under a new committee and coaching structure.

=== Senior team season records ===
Season	Division	W	L	T	Points for	Points against	Final position	Playoff record	Notes
1999	BSL Division One East	6	3	0	121	73	2 / 4	Beat Southern Sundevils 19–7 in quarter-final. Lost 19–33 to Gateshead Senators in semi-final.	—
2000	BSL Division One South	2	6	0	89	269	5 / 7	—	—
2001	BSL Division One South	0	7	1	30	142	7 / 7	–	Spartans withdrew from league after five matches due to lack of players. Relegated to Division Two.
2002	BSL Division Two South	3	6	0	100	139	8 / 9	—	—
2003	BSL Division Two South East	5	4	1	145	125	3 / 8	—	—
2004	BSL Division Two South East	3	6	1	108	148	4 / 6	—	—
2005	BAFL Division Two South East	5	3	2	216	162	2 / 5	Lost 0–20 to Oxford Saints in quarter-final.	—
2006	BAFL Division Two South	5	4	1	244	141	2 / 4	Awarded wildcard playoff against South Wales Warriors. Lost 6–14 to Oxford Saints in quarter-final.	—
2007	BAFL Division Two South East	3	7	0	80	236	4 / 6	—	—
2008	BAFL Division Two South East	1	8	1	126	343	4 / 5	—	—
2009	BAFL Division Two South East	1	8	1	64	237	3 / 4	—	—
2010	BAFA Community Leagues Division Two East	6	4	0	256	115	2 / 6	Lost 29–15 to Hampshire Thrashers in quarter-final	—
2011	BAFA Community Leagues Division Two East	7	2	1	312	98	2 / 6	Lost 7–0 to Lancashire Wolverines in quarter-final	—
2012	BAFA Community Leagues Division One South Central	1	9	0	77	295	8 / 8	–	Relegated to National League at season's end;
2013	BAFA Community Leagues National Division South Central	1	9	0	118	226	7 / 8	–	-

== Other teams and activities ==
In addition to the senior squad, the Spartans operated a youth team which began league play in 2014 after a successful development season. The team was led by Head Coach Steve Mitchell and Assistant Coaches Wes Bourke and Steve Watson with the latter taking the Head Coach position at a later date. Players from the youth teams would go on to play youth football at a European level, as well as in various BUCS organisations.

There are several former players and coaches from the now defunct Anglia Ruskin Phantoms, who played in the BUAFL, currently in the Spartans organisation.

In May 2008, the Spartans began a twinning program with the Billerica Memorial High School football team. This was done with a view to developing the club and squad by exchanging resources, coaching staff and players, and further strengthening the ties between the towns of Billericay and Billerica, Massachusetts, which have been twinned for the last 10 years.
