= Southern Sundevils =

- Established: 1987
- Folded: 2008
- Home stadium: ROKO Leisure Centre, Portsmouth (to 2008)
- League: BAFL

Personnel
- Head coach: Russell Hewitt
- General manager: Mike Shaw

Championships
- League titles (0): None
- Division titles (0): 2 (1998, 2004)

Uniform
Home

Away

The Southern Sundevils were an American football team who competed in the Southern Conference of British American Football League (BAFL) Division One (the second tier of national competition). They played their home games at the ROKO Leisure Centre in Portsmouth, Hampshire, England. Russ Hewitt was the current general manager and head coach. Russ had been with the team since its inception as a player on the youth team and has progressed through the Senior level and since retiring from player was involved in the management and coaching side of the organisation. Many former Sundevil members have coached or played for national sides, with some going on to trial and play for professional or semi-professional teams.

== History ==
=== Sundevils' youth origins – 1987 to 1994 ===
The club was founded as the Eastleigh Royals in October 1987 by 20 young football enthusiasts. The team entered youth competition playing in two-touch competition. The team started their first season in the Southern Conference with defeats at Bournemouth and Chelmsford before winning 14–12 against the Fortek Falcons. The season ended with a 2–6 record.

In 1989 Colin O'Field became team manager and along with new coaching staff the team record improved to 4–4. The 1990 season had promised great things with the addition of Graham Thorpe to assist Coach Riley and so it proved, winning the Southern Conference with a perfect 8–0 record before losing to Waldron in the playoff quarterfinals. 1991 saw the team renamed as the Eastleigh Devils and end their tenure in the two-touch game. They finished the season with a 4–4 record, finishing third in their group and earning a wildcard playoff spot, where they lost 6–8 to the Bournemouth Raiders.

In 1992, the Eastleigh Devils entered the British Youth American Football Association to play youth kitted football in the Coastal Conference, where newly appointed Coach, Martin Keogh joined with Coach Thorpe to see the team win their group with a 4–2 record. As group winners, they were awarded home advantage but that proved to be of no avail as they were beaten heavily by the Southend Sabres, who would eventually be crowned champions.

In 1993, the team changed its name to their present title of the Southern Sundevils. They maintained their steady improvement to record a 7–1 season and the Southern Conference Championship before losing their first playoff match against the Heathrow Jets. On a more positive note, both coaches and five players were chosen for the Great Britain Crusaders team. 1994 was the Sundevils' last season in youth football. In a year which saw many of the more established players retiring and rookies joining the squad, they struggled, finishing bottom of their group.

=== Move into senior football – 1995 to 1998 ===
In 1995, the Sundevils took the decision to begin a senior team. They joined the British Senior League, where they competed in the Southern Conference of Division Three. They struggled in their first season at this new level, posting a 3–7 record, finishing fourth out of six teams but falling well behind the three group leaders who all finished 8–2. The following year saw an improvement, ending the season with a 5–5 record.

The 1997 season saw a reorganisation of the BSL, with the Sundevils being moved to the Southeast Conference of Division Two. With the arrival of Jim Roberson and Simon O'Hara onto the coaching staff, their squad was bolstered by a number of former Winchester Rifles players who had followed Roberson after their team withdrew from the league and folded. The club improved on the previous season, finishing second in their group with a 6–4 record before losing narrowly away to the Bristol Aztecs in the playoffs. The following year proved to be their best season so far as they finished clear winners of their conference with a 7–1 record. Their defence in particular stood out, recording four shutouts and only conceding 53 points in their eight games. Their good form continued into the playoffs, recording home wins against the Southend Sabres and the London Mets, they travelled to the Saffron Lane stadium in Leicester to face the Lancashire Wolverines in the Division Two playoff final. In a tight game, they edged the Wolverines 22–16 to clinch their first divisional championship and earn promotion to Division One.

=== Promotion to the top division ===
The Sundevils lined up in the Central Conference for the 1999 season, and they carried their good form into this higher level. Once again their defence proved strong, conceding just 81 points in their ten games, whilst at the other end, the Sundevils boasted the best-performing offence in the entire BSL, racking up a total of 236 points. Quarterback Cliff Boddington gained an impressive total of 1216 yards and 14 touchdowns in the regular season, making him the league's top passer. Wide Receiver Paul Brady caught 32 receptions to rank fourth in the league. In defence, Mark Penfound won five fumbles and five interceptions, the fourth best tally in the league alongside his teammate Paul Davies. Present Head Coach Russ Hewitt also performed well, racking up four sacks, the fourth best number of sacks in the league. Eventually, they finished second in their group with a 7–2–1 (the only tie being a 0–0 draw away to the Bristol Aztecs) and qualifying once again for the playoffs before losing 7–19 at home to the Essex Spartans.

Compared with the previous season, 2000 was a disappointment, finishing bottom of their group with a 2–6–1 record. 2001 on the other hand saw them return to winning ways, dropping just one game in the regular season to the eventual champions, the London O's. The first playoff match saw them face off against the PA Knights, a team they had already beaten twice that season, and that dominance continued as they won 22–6. Their next match saw them having to make the long trip up to Scotland to face the East Kilbride Pirates, and they failed to register a single point, losing 0–22.

2002 saw the Sundevils struggle once again, recording a 3–7 record and finishing fifth. This saw the team relegated to Division Two of the BSL along with Bristol Aztecs, and it was these two teams who would go on to dominate this conference, with the Sundevils finishing second with a 7–3 record. They were drawn away to the Cambridgeshire Cats in their first playoff match, and the two teams fought out a tight game that finished 6–6 after the regulation four periods. They could not be separated after one period of overtime, but the Cats scored a field goal in the second overtime period to progress.

Despite losing their playoff match, a further reorganisation of the league saw the Sundevils promoted to Division 1A, where they competed in a four-team group with the Cats, the Bristol Aztecs (who won the Divisional playoff) and the Norwich Devils, who had been relegated from Division One. After a ten-game regular season which also saw them play a number of games against teams from Division One as well playing the other teams in their conference, they finished top of Division One A South with a 7–3 record, which saw them beating two of the higher league teams, but also forfeiting a match against the Norwich Devils due to a lack of ambulance at the game. Their top-place finish earned them an automatic place in the playoff semi-final where they played at home to the wild-card entries Staffordshire Surge, recording a heavy 48–3 win, and so earning a trip to the Don Valley Stadium to face their conference rivals from Bristol. They dominated the playoff final, shutting out the Aztecs as they finished with a 32–0 victory to claim their second divisional title.

Their first season back in the top division proved to be an eventful one, in particular their home match against the London O's. Just days before the two sides were due to meet, an anonymous hoaxer telephoned the team's ambulance provider claiming to be general manager Russell Hewitt and cancelling the ambulance provision for the remainder of the season. As an alternative provider could not be found with such short warning Southern were forced to postpone the game and the Olympians generously agreed to reschedule the encounter. Then two weeks before the rescheduled game their home pitch was occupied by a group of travellers who had broken the lock to the gate that prevents vehicle access to the pitch. By law they were allowed to stay camped on the pitch uncontested for a maximum of 28 days, leaving the club management with 12 days to secure an alternative venue. Luckily, the travellers left just before the onset of wet weather that would have seen the pitch destroyed by their presence. In the end, the Olympians won the delayed game 0–22. After a shaky start which saw the Sundevils lose two and draw one of their first four games, they eventually finished third in their group with a 4–5–1 record, enough to earn a wild-card slot in the playoffs. They made the long trip up to face the Gateshead Senators, who they narrowly edged out 9–6 to set up a semi-final match against the PA Knights. After a tight game which saw the two teams tied at the end of regular play, the Knights scored a converted touchdown to put them ahead. The Sundevils replied with a touchdown of their own, but their attempt at a two-point conversion failed and so the Sundevils lost 14–15.

2006 saw the Sundevils fare slightly better, recording a 6–4 record to finish third in their group, earning them a wild-card slot for the second year in a row. They put in a strong performance in beating the Birmingham Bulls 22–6 away from home before travelling to the London Olympians. In a high-scoring match, the Sundevils lost 35–43 to the eventual league champions. 2007 saw the league reorganised, and the top flight containing the Sundevils was rebranded the Premier Division. The season was a disaster for the Sundevils. They lost all ten of their games, failing to score a single point in seven of them and scoring just 20 points in total. As such, they were relegated, where they now play in Division One South.

=== Senior team season records ===
Season	Division	W	L	T	PF	PA	Final position	Playoff record	Notes
1995	BAFA Division Three South	3	7	0	98	196	4 / 6		
1996	BSL Division Three South West	5	5	0	150	232	4 / 7		
1997	BSL Division Two South East	6	4	0	209	183	2 / 5	Lost 6–16 to Bristol Aztecs in quarter-final.	
1998	BSL Division Two South West	7	1	0	242	53	1 / 4	Beat Southend Sabres 30–16 in quarter-final. Beat London Mets 10–6 in semi-final. Beat Lancashire Wolverines 22–16 in final.	Division Two champions. Promoted to Division One.
1999	BSL Division One South	7	2	1	236	81	2 / 5	Lost 7–19 to the Essex Spartans	
2000	BSL Division One South	2	6	0	136	187	7 / 7		
2001	BSL Division One South	7	1	0	236	128	2 / 7	Beat PA Knights 26–6 in wild-card match. Lost 0–22 to East Kilbride Pirates in semi-final.	
2002	BSL Division One South	3	7	0	94	175	5 / 7		Relegated to Division Two.
2003	BSL Division Two South West	7	3	0	148	88	2 / 6	Lost 6–9 to Cambridgeshire Cats in quarter-final.	Promoted to Division One A.
2004	BSL Division 1A South	7	3	0	203	95	1 / 4	Beat Staffordshire Surge 48–3 in semi-final. Beat Bristol Aztecs 32–0 in final.	Division One A champions. Promoted to Division One.
2005	BAFL Division One South	4	5	1	155	126	3 / 4	Beat Gateshead Senators 3–6 in wild-card match. Lost 14–15 to PA Knights in semi-final.	
2006	BAFL Division One South	6	4	0	288	199	3 / 4	Beat Birmingham Bulls 22–6 in quarter-final. Lost 35–43 to London Olympians in semi-final.	
2007	BAFL Premier Division	0	10	0	20	292	8 / 8		Relegated to Division One
2008	BAFL Division One South	6	4	0	165	110	2 / 6	Lost 22–30 to Redditch Arrows in semi-final.	

== Notable players ==
- Shaun Smith – LB – selected for Carolina Panthers 2008 practice squad, Played two NFL Europa seasons for the Rhein Fire and Berlin Thunder.
- Rob Hart – K – Played for London Monarchs and Scottish Claymores. NFL training Camp for Tampa Bay Buccaneers [2002], Miami Dolphins [2003] & New Orlean Saints [2004]
