= Emmanuel Oyebadejo =

English gridiron football player (born 2004)

No. 99 – Florida Gators
- Position: Defensive lineman
- Class: Redshirt Senior

Personal information
- Born: April 1, 2004 (age 22)
- Listed height: 6 ft 7 in (2.01 m)
- Listed weight: 303 lb (137 kg)

Career information
- High school: Loreto College (Manchester, England)
- College: Exeter (2023–2024); Jacksonville State (2024–2025); Florida (2026–present)

Career history
- Manchester Titans (2023–2024)

Awards and highlights
- First-team All-Conference USA (2025); Britbowl champion (XXXV); BUCS National Trophy champion (2024)
- Stats at ESPN

Emmanuel Oyebadejo (born April 1, 2004) is an English gridiron football player who is a defensive end for the Florida Gators. He previously played for the Exeter Demons and the Jacksonville State Gamecocks.

== Early life ==
Oyebadejo was born on April 1, 2004. A native of Manchester, England, he grew up playing football (soccer) as a midfielder until age 11 or 12. According to Oyebadejo, he "got way too big for it too quickly". He then switched to basketball, playing the power forward and center positions. Oyebadejo was called up to represent England internationally at both the under-16 and under-18 age levels. He also helped his club, the Manchester Magic, win the Under-18 National Cup in 2022.

Oyebadejo attended Loreto College in Manchester, and was subsequently accepted to the University of Exeter in Southwest England for medical school. He was recruited to the school's American football team in 2023 by the coaches, who noticed a 19-year-old Oyebadejo watching a friend play from the sidelines. "So, that next Wednesday I was there and playing," he said. "Initially, I was just looking for something to keep myself active and busy in my spare time when I wasn’t studying for tests and exams. But then over time, I grew to fall in love with the sport."

=== Early football career ===
Oyebadejo helped the Exeter Demons to a perfect season in 2023–24, capturing the BUCS National Trophy championship after beating Nottingham Trent in the final. He asked his coaches to compile a highlight tape of his to send out to American schools, which received some interest. After just one season in England, Oyebadejo's tape caught the attention of Florida State linebackers coach Randy Shannon, and an official visit was scheduled for January 2024. However, the trip ultimately did not happen, and he went on to commit to play for head coach Rich Rodriguez at Jacksonville State.

Aside from his college team, Oyebadejo also played for the Manchester Titans of the BAFA National Leagues. He helped the team to a 44–27 win over the London Warriors in Britbowl XXXV in 2023. Oyebadejo later appeared in their first-round game in the 2024 Central European Football League against the Stockholm Mean Machines. It was the first appearance by a British team in European competition in seven years.

== College career ==
Oyebadejo moved to the U.S. in July 2024 to play for Jacksonville State. However, he missed the entire 2024 season after suffering an injury in preseason camp. In his first season in the U.S. in 2025, Oyebadejo started all 14 games at defensive end and tallied 41 tackles, 6.5 for tackles for loss, 4.5 sacks, five pass breakups, and two forced fumbles, earning first-team all-Conference USA honors. After the conclusion of the season, he entered the NCAA transfer portal. Oyebadejo was rated as a three-star transfer recruit as well as the No. 19 and No. 26 defensive lineman in the portal by On3.com and 247Sports, respectively. He garnered considerable interest from Power Four programs, including Georgia, Texas A&M and Florida.

On January 6, 2026, Oyebadejo announced his decision to transfer to Florida. Entering his final year of eligibility, he focused on developing his technique and physicality under Gators defensive line coach Gerald Chatman that offseason. Oyebadejo recorded a sack in the Orange & Blue spring game.

== National team career ==
In 2023, Oyebadejo was called up to the Great Britain national under-19 team training camp.

== Personal life ==
Oyebadejo is of Nigerian descent. He grew up rooting for Manchester United F.C. When Oyebadejo began pursuing his college football career in the United States, his parents were initially hesitant to see him leave medical school in England. However, they warmed up to the idea after being flown out to the U.S. on an official visit. Oyebadejo had to learn to drive in the U.S., and passed his driver's test in January 2026.
