= Tiger Bay Warriors =

American-flag football team in Cardiff, Wales

- Established: 1987
- Folded: 2000
- Based in: Cardiff, Wales
- Home stadium: Butetown Community Centre and Field
- League: British Senior League
- Division: Division 2 Southern

Personnel
- Head coach: Robert Mota
- General manager: Malcom

Championships
- League titles (0): Conference Champions 1999
- Division titles (0): BSL Division Two runners-up 1999

Uniform
Home kit

Away kit

The Tiger Bay Warriors were a Junior American flag football and the first junior full-contact team in the UK, established in Cardiff in 1987. After initial success with regional and national trophies, they rose to senior level, a loss of key players halted the momentum and the team folded in 2000.

== History ==
=== Tiger Bay Warriors (1993 to 2000) ===
The club was formed in 1987 as the Tiger Bay Warriors, although started out as a Junior Flag team, they trained in full contact with kit from 8 years upward. Although no other junior contact teams had yet been formed in the UK, the Warriors were offered fixtures with two US airbases (presumably made up from their accompanying children). But were declined due to uncertainty of the age of potential opposition.

In 1993 they were accepted into Junior Division Two Touch and recorded a 4–0–0 record in the regular season (including one postponed game against the Gloucester Gladiators which was awarded to the Warriors) before narrowly losing the bowl game 6–8 to the London Capitals.

The following two years, the Warriors played at Youth Kitted level. In 1994 season they won the BYAFA South East Division with a perfect 8–0 record and reached the playoff semi-final. In 1995, they recorded a 2–3 season in the Southern Division but still managed to reach the playoffs, losing 0–8 to the London Capitals in their quarter-final.

The decision was then taken to move up to senior level, and the Warriors were admitted to the Southwest Conference of the British Senior League's third division. Their experience in their previous youth tournaments seemed to serve them well as their first season at this level saw them post an 8–2 record, finishing second in their conference. They went on the reach the playoff semi-final before losing to the eventual divisional champions, the Winchester Rifles. They reached the play-offs once again in 1997 after finishing second in their conference, only to be forced to withdraw from their playoff match against the PA Knights due to an acute player shortage.

As with the year before, the Warriors finished the 1998 regular season in second place, tied with the Southern Sundevils with a 7–1 record but with an inferior points difference. As a result, they lost home advantage for their playoff match and this proved crucial as they went down by a single point to the London Mets. The following year, they once again finished the regular season with a 7–1 record tied with the Hertfordshire Stags and the Sabres, but they avoided last season's disappointment by finishing top on points difference. This paid off as they made it all the way to the divisional play-off final before losing a tight final game against the Chester Romans by just two points.

Unfortunately the Warriors were unable to build on this success. After losing several key players and the services of Head Coach Rob Mota, they were forced to withdraw from the league in 2000 and subsequently the team disbanded.

== Stadium ==
With the team based in Cardiff with most of their games were played at Canton rugby club, Channel View Leisure Centre and Roath Park.

=== Senior team season records ===
Season	Division	W	L	T	PF	PA	Final position	Playoff record	Notes
1996	BSL Division 2 Southwest	8	2	0	330	116	2 / 7	Beat Norwich Devils 48–25 in quarter-final. Lost 0–20 to Winchester Rifles in semi-final.	—
1997	BSL Division 2 South West	7	3	0	106	109	2 / 4	Withdrew from playoffs due to player shortage	—
1998	BAFL Division 2 Southwest	7	1	0	193	73	2 / 4	Lost 12–13 to Southern Sundevils in quarter-final.	—
1999	BSL Division 2 Southern	7	1	0	159	64	1 / 7	Beat Plymouth Admirals 31–15 in quarter-final. Beat Southend Sabres 13–9 in semi-final. Lost 22–24 to Chester Romans in final.	Conference champions
2000	DID NOT COMPETE								
