= Boston Trophy =

The Boston Trophy was the trophy awarded each year to the winning team of the British American Football League's (BAFL) annual Premier Division Championship game, BritBowl and was BAFL's most prestigious award.

The trophy was named in honor of the town, Boston, Lincolnshire, where the League was first established.

Introduced at BritBowl XX, the trophy is a life-size replica of an end zone pylon in a bright metal finish. Each of the four facets of the trophy can accommodate the names of twenty five BritBowl champions. The names of the first nineteen champions were added prior to BritBowl XX.

The final winners were the London Blitz, who defeated Coventry Jets 34-20 in BritBowl XXIV on 18 September 2010. At BritBowl XXV, the trophy was awarded permanently to the London Olympians, in recognition of their nine title wins, the most of any British team.

== Boston Trophy Winners ==
BritBowl	Year	Champion	Result	Opponent
XXVIII	2014	London Warriors	10-8	London Blitz
XXVII	2013	London Warriors	26-23	London Blitz
XXVI	2012	London Blitz	37-21	London Warriors
XXV	2011	London Blitz	18-0	London Warriors
XXIV	2010	London Blitz	34-20	Coventry Cassidy Jets
XXIII	2009	London Blitz	27-6	Coventry Cassidy Jets
XXII	2008	Coventry Cassidy Jets	33-32	London Blitz
XXI	2007	London Blitz	14-6	Coventry Cassidy Jets
XX	2006	London Olympians	45-30	London Blitz

== See also ==
- British American Football League
- BritBowl
