= East Kent Mavericks =

American football team based in the United Kingdom

- Founded: 2001; 25 years ago
- League: BAFA National Leagues
- Division: SFC 1 East
- Location: Canterbury, Kent
- Stadium: Simon Langton Boys School, Canterbury
- Colours: Black Helmets; Grey Jerseys; Grey Pants
- Head coach: Emeka 'V' Anyaegbu
- Championships: 1 (2023)
- Conference titles: 1 (2023)
- Division titles: 5 (2025, 2024, 2023, 2012, 2009)
- Playoff berths: 5 (2025, 2024, 2023, 2012, 2009)

The East Kent Mavericks are an American football team based in Canterbury, Kent. First formed in 2001 as a flag football team, they are the BAFA National Leagues '23 D2 National Champions and current SFC 1 East Divisional Champions.

== History ==
The team was originally formed in 2001 as the Canterbury Coyotes. They immediately entered the British Senior Flag League, and competed in the Southern Conference. After the six-game regular season, they finished second with a 3-2-1 record, narrowly qualifying for the playoffs over the Bournemouth Raiders. They easily won their semifinal matchup away to the UCLA Renegades, scoring 34 points without reply to earn them a place in the final against the London Gators, which they eventually lost 14–22.

The following season, they relocated to Aylesford and renamed themselves the Invicta Coyotes. They entered the BSFL nine-man league and finished the regular season unbeaten with a 5-0-3 record, enough for them to come second and once again qualify for the playoffs. They were drawn against the Bournemouth Raiders, a team against whom they had already tied during the regular season, and the playoff game also proved to be a tight one, going into overtime before the Raiders won 0–6.

In 2004 the club committee decided it was time to take the next step up and recruit to join the British Senior League playing full contact American football, so they bowed out of the semi contact flag league. They relocated back to their original home city of Canterbury and became affiliate members of the British American Football League as the East Kent Mavericks, where they recruited and practiced for two seasons. After completing the obligatory friendlies against teams such as the Kent Exiles, the Mavericks proved they were ready for competitive action.

In 2006 they were officially accepted as full members of the league and duly given a spot in the Southern Conference of Division Two. They found this new level of football more difficult and, despite several close games, they finished the season in last place with a 0-10 record.

In the restructuring of the league prior to the 2007 season, they were moved into the South East conference where they enjoyed more success, recording five shutouts, finishing with an even 5-5 record and only missing the playoffs by one place.

During the 2008 season the team improved yet again, this time reaching a 6-4 record. However, in a crucial game, the Mavericks surrendered a 28-7 lead in losing to the Colchester Gladiators which eliminated them from playoff contention.

The 2009 season proved to be East Kent's best yet. This year, the Mavericks held their nerve in a late season game on 12 July 2009 against the London Olympians, earning a tight 16-8 victory which was described as "The biggest win in their history". The team finally clinched a playoff berth in the last game of the season with a win over the Maidstone Pumas. The game however was marred by a great tragedy when Pumas linebacker Alan Newcombe, who was standing on the Pumas' sideline, suddenly collapsed and died. In the playoffs, the Mavericks lost out in the quarter-finals 6–24 to Hampshire Thrashers. They finished the season with an impressive 8-1-1 record.

The 2010 season saw the Mavericks promoted to Division One South East during an offseason restructure. Their first victory Division 1 came in the form of a 6-0 result against the Peterborough Saxons with Gary Welch converting two field goals to seal the win. The Mavericks finished with a respectable 3-7 record to complete their first season in a higher division. The 2011 season was much of the same, recording 2 wins and completing a 2-8 record.

2012 saw a change in coaching staff, with Glenn Lindley appointed as Head Coach and various other new coaches taking up positions. A new influx of youth and university players saw a new impetus in the mentality and focus within the team. A Josh Adamson-led spread offence produced 314 points and recorded wins against the Sussex Thunder, South Wales Warriors and Ipswich Cardinals, all firsts for the franchise. The Mavericks finished 8-2 and were awarded a playoff bye-week as division winners. The team faced the Sussex Thunder in the playoff semifinals and lost 37-30 in a disappointing match after beating Sussex twice in regular season. Despite the playoff loss, this was the most successful season in the Mavericks short history.

Prior to the 2013 season, the British American Football Association decided to restructure the National Leagues, switching from a three-tier to a two-tier system, doubling the size of the Premiership team in the process. Having finished top in the Division One South East the previous season (though knocked out in the playoffs semifinals), the Mavs were promoted to the Premiership South. Despite it being their first ever season in the top flight of football in the UK, the Mavericks began the season strongly, winning six of their first seven games, including the first win over the Cambridgeshire Cats in team history. The Mavs ended up with a 6-4 record, losing their final three games to the London Blitz, Bristol Aztecs and eventual national champions London Warriors - all three of whom made the playoffs. The Mavericks were the only team from among those who were promoted to the Premiership following the 2013 realignment to finish the year with a winning record.

The Mavericks began their 2014 campaign in Week 3 of the BAFANL season, in a road trip against the Cambridgeshire Cats. After having notched up their first win over the Cats in franchise history in a home contest the previous season, the Mavs clocked up their first win against the Cats in Cambridgeshire, securing a hard-fought 28-20 victory. The Mavs' second game saw them losing a tough road battle against the London Olympians 20-8, before losing their home opener to the Colchester Gladiators in a close 40-37 defeat.

== Senior team season records ==
Season	Division	Wins	Losses	Ties	PF	PA	Final position	Playoff record	Notes
2001	BSFL Southern Division	3	2	1	70	76	2nd/4	Beat UCLA Renegades 34-0 in Semi-Final. Lost London Gators 14-22 in Final.	As Canterbury Coyotes. Flag Football.
2002	BSFL National Conference	5	0	3	140	52	2nd/7	Lost Bournemouth Raiders 0-6 in Semi-Final.	As Invicta Coyotes. Flag Football Nine Man League.
2003	Did Not Compete								
2004	Did Not Compete								
2005	Did Not Compete								
2006	BAFL D2 South	0	10	0	85	247	4th/4	-	First season in contact football.
2007	BAFL D2 South East	5	5	0	169	113	3rd/6	-	-
2008	BAFL D2 South East	6	4	0	225	193	3rd/5	-	-
2009	BAFL D2 South East	8	1	1	322	45	1st/4	Lost Hampshire Thrashers 6-24 in Quarter-Final.	Division Champions
2010	BAFA D1 South East	3	7	0	173	242	5th/6	-	-
2011	BAFA D1 South East	2	8	0	165	322	5th/6	-	-
2012	BAFA D1 South & Central	8	2	0	314	193	1st/6	Lost Sussex Thunder 30-37 in Semi-Final.	Division Champions
2013	BAFA Premiership South	6	4	0	233	370	5th/10	-	-
2014	BAFA Premiership South	1	7	0	133	305	9th/9	-	-
2015	BAFA SFC 1 South	2	8	0	123	371	4th/4	-	-
2016	BAFA SFC 2 South	8	2	0	318	51	2nd/5	Lost Bristol Apache 54-12 in Quarter-Final.	-
2017	BAFA SFC 2 East	7	3	0	316	168	2nd/5	Lost Berkshire Renegades 34-7 in Quarter-Final.	-
2018	BAFA SFC 1 East	0	10	0	112	337	5th/5	-	-
2019	BAFA SFC 2 South	3	5	0	160	150	4th/6	-	-
2020	Season Cancelled (COVID)								
2021	BAFA South East	4	3	0	185	87	3rd/5	-	-
2022	BAFA SFC 2 East	3	5	0	163	113	3rd/4	-	-
2023	BAFA SFC 2 East	7	0	1	198	48	1st/5	Beat Hereford Stampede 43-3 in Quarter-Final. Beat Somerset Wyverns 37-21 in Semi-Final. Beat Shropshire Revolution 55-14 in National Final at Britbowl XXXV.	National Champions. Conference Champions. Division Champions.
2024	BAFA SFC 1 East	8	0	0	188	61	1st/5	Lost Wembley Stallions 21-24 in Quarter-Final.	Division Champions
2025	BAFA SFC 1 East	7	1	0	227	90	1st/5	Lost Wembley Stallions 14-11 in Semi-Final.	Division Champions
