= Cambridgeshire Cats =

American Football team based in the United Kingdom

Logo

General information
- Founded: 1984; 42 years ago
- Stadium: Shelford Rugby Club
- Headquartered: Cambridge, Cambridgeshire

Personnel
- Head coach: Russ Begbie

League / conference affiliations
- BAFA National Leagues; Premier Division South

Championships
- League championships: 0 None
- Conference championships: 0; 8 (1985, 1994, 2003, 2008, 2010, 2019, 2021, 2022)
- Division championships: 0; 2 (1994, 1995)

Current uniform
Home

Away

The Cambridgeshire Cats, previously known as the Cambridge County Cats, Cambridge Crunchers, and Cambridge Wildcats, are an American football team based in Cambridge, Cambridgeshire, England who compete in BAFA National Leagues Premier Division South. They play their home games at Shelford Rugby Club in Great Shelford. The club was first formed in 1984, entered senior competition in 1985 and won two divisional titles in the 1990s as well appearing in the playoffs a further six times before folding in 1998. They reformed once again in 2002 and re-entered senior competition, gaining promotion in 2003 only to be relegated two seasons later. Most recently, they won the South East Conference of Division One before losing to the Solent Thrashers in the playoff final.

== History ==
The club was first formed in December 1984 as the Cambridge County Cats following trials conducted in the city by the RAF Wyton Eagles, one of the first American football teams to be founded in the UK. They joined the British American Football Federation for the 1985 season, where they competed in the A1 Division and finished top with a perfect 8–0 regular season record in front of crowds often in excess of 600, before losing to the Croydon Coyotes in the semi-final.

The following year, they switched to the newly formed Budweiser League, where they were elected straight into the top division. They finished with a 6–4 record and qualified for the playoffs where they lost in the first round away to the Wrekin Giants. They were unable to repeat this success the following year—they finished bottom of their group with a 0–9–1 record and so were relegated. They returned to winning ways in the lower division, recording eight consecutive wins on their way to finishing second in their group before losing 24–34 away to the Scottish champions, the Glasgow Diamonds.

1989 was a year of change for the Cats. After securing a sponsorship deal with the Washington State Apple Commission, a Seattle-based apple export firm, they were renamed the Cambridge Crunchers. They also left the Budweiser League to join the newly formed Combined Gridiron League where they were admitted into the top division, competing in the Central Conference of the Crown National Division. They finished second in the group behind the Colchester Gladiators, and qualified once again for the playoffs. Unfortunately, they were unable to progress, losing 3–27 at home to the Heathrow Jets.

The following year saw a degree of turmoil for the club, beginning when their sponsors suddenly decided to withdraw their support forcing the club to change its name once again, becoming the Cambridge Wildcats. They moved over to the NCMMA following the demise of the CGL and despite suffering from low team numbers, the team recorded a 6–3–1 season record and so qualified for the playoffs. However, it was revealed that they hadn't paid the required league fees and so they were excluded from the post-season. During the close season, they entered into merger negotiations with another local team, the Newmarket Hornets. However, it emerged that it was actually a take-over attempt by Newmarket, and the club chose to fold rather than lose its identity.

After two years of inactivity, the club was reformed as the Cambridge Cats with a squad of over 40 players, half of whom came from the 1990 Wildcats team. They joined the British National Gridiron League in 1993, where they played in the East Midlands conference of Division One. They reached the playoffs at the first attempt after finishing second in a campaign which saw them score more than 40 points in six of their ten games. They were drawn away to the Derbyshire Braves in the wild-card round, who they beat to set up a tie against the Redditch Arrows. In a high-scoring game, they won by 54 points to 40 before losing their semi-final against the Lincoln Saints.

They joined the British American Football Association in 1994, marking the start of the club's most successful spell. They entered the Midlands conference of Division Three and finished top, winning eight of their ten games. As in the previous season, they faced the Redditch Arrows, who they shut out whilst scoring 42 points. The semi-final saw them win away to the Chester Romans to set up their first play-off final. They secured their first divisional title by defeating the Crawley Raiders 25–14.

As a result of their playoff win, the Cats were promoted to Division Two, where they competed in the North / Midlands conference and finished second with an 8–2 record. After beating the Chiefs in the playoff quarter-finals, they were drawn at home to the Lancashire Wolverines, who had been responsible for the Cats' only two defeats earlier in the season including 35-point shutout. There was no repeat of that heavy defeat this time as the Cats won 42–23 to set up a final against the Plymouth Admirals. After falling 13 points behind, they eventually won 28–13 to secure their second consecutive divisional championship and promotion.

They struggled in their first season at this higher level, the top flight of the newly renamed British Senior League (BSL), after many the top players decided to retire before the season started. To make matters worse, the head coach and several players walked out after only a couple of games. Cambridge's dismal season ended abruptly when they could not afford to play their final two home games. After winning just two of their ten games, they finished fourth out of the five teams which made up the North Conference. They once again finished second from bottom the following year, (ahead of the Northants Storm who folded after just three games), and once again in 1998. The Cats finally folded prior to the start of the 1999 season.

Three years later, the club was reformed under their present name of the Cambridgeshire Cats by Chris Wallis, and they entered the Division Two South of the BSL, where they qualified for the playoffs at the first attempt by finishing third out of nine teams, before losing to the Plymouth Admirals in the quarter-final. 2003 saw them perform even better, recording a perfect 10–0 regular season record and finishing top of the South East Conference. They were drawn at home to the Southern Sundevils in their quarter-final, and needed two periods of overtime before eventually beating them 9–6. However, they lost their semi-final at home to the Bristol Aztecs.

Despite this disappointment, they were awarded promotion to the new Division 1A, where they finished third in their group and earned a wild-card playoff slot only to lose once again to the Aztecs, this time by a single point. 2005 saw them struggle with player moves and two changes at head coach. Winning only one game and scoring just 40 points, they were bottom of the South conference, resulting in them being relegated to Division Two.

2006 saw them surge back to success under Head Coach Rick Bice, finishing with a 5–4–1 record, barely missing out on the playoffs. In 2007, further success saw them qualify for the playoffs after finishing second in the South East conference with a 7–3 record before losing away to the South Wales Warriors 13–7 in the quarter-final.

== See also ==
- BAFA National Leagues
- British American Football League
