= Plymouth Admirals =

Logo

General information
- Founded: 1984
- Stadium: Parkway Social Club, Plymouth

Personnel
- General manager: Paula Dodds
- Head coach: Mark Tanner

League / conference affiliations
- BAFL

Championships
- League championships: 0 None
- Division championships: 0; 1 (1991)

Current uniform

Home

The Plymouth Admirals were an American Football team who competed in the British American Football League (BAFL) up until 2010. They played their home games at the Parkway Sports Club in Ernesettle, Plymouth. Formed in 1984, the Admirals were one of the longest established American football teams in the United Kingdom. They enjoyed a fair degree of success, spending a number of years in the top division, figuring in post-season playoffs on eight occasions, and winning the BNGL Premier Division playoffs in 1991.

== History ==
The Plymouth Admirals were formed in October 1984 by Al Smith and Andy Richardson, they played two matches in their first year of competition, scoring victories over the Weston Stars and the Bristol Bombers. They entered the Budweiser League Channel Division Two in 1986 and proceeded to win their division with a perfect 10–0 record, achieving a shutout in six of their matches including a huge 91–0 win over the Weston Stars. Unfortunately, they were drawn away to Northants Stormbringers in their first playoff match – facing a team who had finished second in the Atlantic Premier Division, they were always the underdogs and they lost 8–35 to the eventual semi-finalists.

The following season saw them finish second in the Southwest conference of the Budweiser League's Premier Division – however, this was not enough to qualify for the playoffs due to the structuring of the league. Despite moving to the Plymouth Sports Club, a certain amount of turmoil was experienced in the build-up to the following season due to the demise of the Budweiser League. Faced with the prospect of a year without any competitive matches, the club took the decision to step down a level and play in the South West American Football League where they faced more local teams. Despite scoring a number of heavy wins, they finished third in the league with a 7–3 record.

The Admirals joined the British National Gridiron League in 1989, entering at Premier Division level (the second of the league's three tiers). Just as the previous season, they finished with a 7–3 record which saw them finish second in their conference, but narrowly missed out on a playoff spot. 1990 was a somewhat mediocre season, losing four out of their first five matches before ending strongly, although their situation off the field was much healthier – they were now playing on a new astroturf pitch at the Plymouth Sports Centre and were attracting an average attendance of between 200 and 300 supporters for each home game.

1991 proved to be the best season in the club's history. After comfortably winning their conference with a perfect 10–0 record, conceding just 30 points in the process, they were drawn away to against wildcard qualifiers Gwent Mustangs in their first playoff match. This proved to be a very tight matchup until the last quarter when the Admirals pulled away to win 27–7. After defeating the LA (London Area) Panthers (who finished the season as champions of the Midlands conference), they earned a trip to the Saffron Lane Stadium in Leicester to face the Sutton Coldfield Royals in their first ever playoff final. Cheered on by a large travelling contingent, the Admirals beat their opponents 26–16 to claim the UK Premier Bowl Trophy and gain promotion to the top flight.

The Admirals carried this good fortune into their first season in the BNGL National Division, winning their first four games as part of a 21-game winning streak. The defeat suffered at the hands of the Delonghi Knights proved to be the only loss in the regular season as they won the National Southwest Division with a 9–1 record. They were given home advantage in the playoffs, where they narrowly lost to the Kent Cougars by a single point. The following season also saw the Admirals reach the playoffs, this time as a wildcard, before losing to eventual champions the Bournemouth Buccaneers.

1994 saw the Admirals move into the British American Football Association, where they competed at Division Two level. They finished as runners-up in the Southwest conference in a season which saw them play two inter-conference matches and also draw both their games against the Southern Seminoles. Their second-place finish was enough to qualify for the playoffs, but just as in the season before they were beaten in the quarter-finals by the eventual playoff winners, this time the Milton Keynes Pioneers. The next season proved to be much better as the Admirals finished top of their conference with an 8–1 record. After beating the London Olympians and the Crawley Raiders, they reached their second playoff final played in Birmingham, again in front of a large number of their own supporters. They faced off against the Cambridge Cats and, although they lost 13–26, they still earned promotion.

Their new tenure at this level did not begin well as, due to new British Senior League rulings, they were forced to leave Plymouth Sports Centre, and so took up residence at the astroturf pitch owned by the College of St Mark and St John. This coupled with the higher level of competition saw the Admirals register their first losing season, finishing second-from-bottom of Division One South with a 4–6 record. The following year saw them finish 5–5, before they endured their most disappointing league campaign. After relocating again, this time to the Western Mill Oak Villa, the squad was hit badly by a number of established players retiring. After playing most of the season with a largely rookie squad, they lost all ten of their games and so were relegated for the first time.

The first season back in Division Two saw the Admirals' coach Steve Howard adopt a new offensive and defensive system to help develop his young players. They finished the season in fourth place with a 4–4, but were beaten in their first playoff match by the Tiger Bay Warriors. 2000 was a frustrating year in which the team failed to pick up a single win, a record which was improved upon the following year when they earned a playoff spot after finishing the season 3–4–1, before losing away to conference champions the Oxford Saints.

After playing a season at the home of Plymouth Albion R.F.C. for a year, the Admirals returned to Oak Villa for the 2002 season. They enjoyed a more successful season, losing just three of their ten games to finish second in Division Two South. After beating the Cambridgeshire Cats at home in their playoff quarter-final, they faced a long trip up to Norfolk to face the Norwich Devils, who had won the conference with a perfect record. The Devils easily won the semi-final 0–22 in a game remembered for suffering a number of stoppages due to lightning and torrential rain.

That proved to be the Admirals' last playoff appearance to date. In 2003 they were once again forced to relocate, this time due to the renovation of the pitches at Western Mill Oak Villa, and so they moved to Stonehouse Creek. This disruption coupled with a small squad of just 19, mostly young and university players, saw the Admirals slump to 0–10 season. 2004 saw the squad bolstered by the arrival of several American players, including Montrell Turner, who was named Top Tackler in BSL Division Two. Performances were improved, although the Admirals only won two of their ten games, losing six and drawing the other two. 2005 also saw the Admirals record just two victories, both of them over the league's newcomers the Andover Thrashers, although a number of these losses were by small margins. This was again equalled the following year with both victories coming against an expansion team, this time the Reading Renegades.

The Admirals were once again forced to move grounds prior to the 2007 season due to the Stonehouse Creek ground ruled unsuitable just weeks before their first match, and so they moved to their present home at the Parkway Sports Club in Ernesettle. The team improved slightly on their previous season by winning three games and losing seven, seeing them secure the most wins and score the most points since 2002, concede the fewest points since 2004, and win their first game against a non-expansion team for five years.

=== Senior team season records ===
Season	Division	W	L	T	PF	PA	Final position	Playoff record	Notes
1986	Budweiser League Channel Division Two	10	0	0	432	30	1 / 8	Lost 8–35 to Northants Stormbringers in first round	Conference champions
1987	Budweiser League Premier Division South West	8	2	0	300	131	2 / 6	—	—
1988	South West AFL	7	4	0	437	142	3 / 7	—	—
1989	BNGL Premier Division Southern C	7	3	0	269	116	2 / 5	—	—
1990	BNGL Premier Division South West	6	4	0	342	183	4 / 7	—	—
1991	BNGL Premier Division South West	10	0	0	224	30	1 / 5	Beat Gwent Mustangs 27–7 in quarter-final. Beat LA Panthers 30–24 in semi-final. Beat Sutton Coldfield Royals 26–16 in final.	Division champions. Promoted to National Division.
1992	BNGL National Division South West	9	1	0	199	115	1 / 5	Lost 21–22 to Kent Cougars in quarter-final.	Conference champions.
1993	BNGL National Division South	6	3	1	184	153	3 / 5	Lost 12–25 to Bournemouth Buccaneers in quarter-final.	—
1994	BAFA Division Two South West	7	1	2	320	135	2 / 5	Lost 0–12 to Milton Keynes Pioneers in quarter-final.	—
1995	BAFA Division Two South West	8	1	0	194	84	1 / 4	Beat London Olympians 31–18 in quarter-final. Beat Crawley Raiders 35–14 in semi-final. Lost 13–28 to Cambridge Cats in final.	Conference champions. Promoted to Division One
1996	BSL Division One South	4	6	0	153	198	4 / 5	—	—
1997	BSL Division One Southwest & Midlands	5	5	0	35	101	4 / 5	—	—
1998	BSL Division One South West	0	10	0	88	310	6 / 6	—	Relegated to Division Two
1999	BSL Division Two South	4	4	0	164	119	4 / 7	Lost 15–31 to Tiger Bay Warriors in quarter-final.	—
2000	BSL Division Two South	0	7	1	60	225	5 / 5	—	—
2001	BSL Division Two South	3	4	1	120	98	5 / 9	—	—
2002	BSL Division Two South	7	2	0	304	140	2 / 9	Beat Cambridgeshire Cats 36–25 in quarter-final. Lost 0–23 to Norwich Devils in semi-final.	—
2003	BSL Division Two South West	0	10	0	58	302	6 / 6	—	—
2004	BSL Division Two South West	2	6	2	54	113	5 / 6	—	—
2005	BSL Division Two South West	2	8	0	72	218	5 / 6	—	—
2006	BSL Division Two West	2	8	0	71	334	4 / 5	—	—
2007	BAFL Division Two South West	3	7	0	107	140	4 / 5	—	—
2008	BAFL Division Two South West	2	8	0	88	225	4 / 5	—	Record includes two defeats by forfeit.
2009	BAFL Division Two South West	0	10	0	68	476	5 / 5	—	Record includes one defeat by forfeit
