= Shaun Smith (linebacker) =

American football player (born 1982)

No. 46
- Position: Linebacker

Personal information
- Born: April 5, 1982 (age 44); Brighton, England
- Listed height: 6 ft 3 in (1.91 m)
- Listed weight: 248 lb (112 kg)

Career information
- College: None

Career history
- Southern Sundevils (2001–2004); Rhein Fire (2005–2006); Berlin Thunder (2007); Carolina Panthers (2008)*
- * Offseason or practice squad member only

Awards and highlights
- European All-Star (2004)

Shaun Smith (born April 5, 1982) is a former American football linebacker who was an international practice squad player for the Carolina Panthers of the National Football League. He was signed by the Southern Sundevils in 2001.

Smith was also a member of the Rhein Fire and Berlin Thunder.
