= Ipswich Cardinals =

American football team based in the United Kingdom

- First season: 1986; 40 years ago
- Head coach: Liam “Puff” Smith; 2024-Present season,
- Location: Ipswich, Suffolk
- Field: Ipswich YM Rugby club, The Street, Rushmere St Andrew, Ipswich, IP5 1DG
- League: BAFANL
- Conference: National division
- Division: South East Conference 2
- Colors: Burgundy and Gold
- All-time record: 156–155–19 (.502)
- Bowl record: 2–5–0 (.286)

National championships
- Claimed: 2

Division championships
- 4

Uniforms
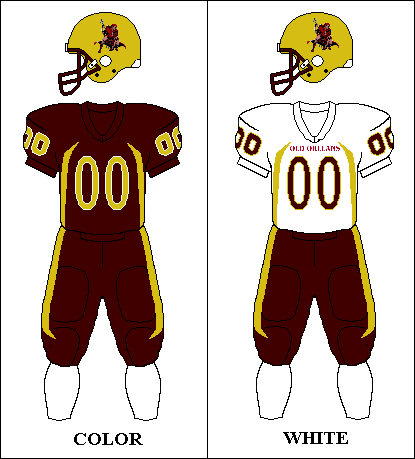

The Ipswich Cardinals are an American football team from the United Kingdom based in Ipswich, Suffolk. The team plays in the National Division South East Conference of BAFANL – the second tier of the BAFA National Leagues.

== History ==
Formed by Colin Cox, Mark LePorte and Don Laisure II in December 1985 at the Drunken Docker pub in Ipswich. The club was formed by the players for the players, the club was owned by the players.

The name comes from one of Ipswich's most famous sons, Cardinal Thomas Wolsey, who was Henry VIII's Lord chancellor (Chief advisor to the king). It is a clever play on the traditional name for some American sports teams, whereas theirs is generally a reference to the cardinal bird, their name is a tribute to a local historical figure.

The team's first training session was set for January 1986 at Gainsborough sports centre, Ipswich. Over 100 hopefuls turned up for tryouts. The committee approached Jack Garner who was the head coach of the Woodbridge high school team. He became the head coach until he was transferred to Holland – then, with the team coach-less, JJ Johnson was asked to help. JJ and Andy Melton took over the coaching roles, whilst Don Laisure stepped down and played instead.

== All-time record ==
Season	Division	Wins	Losses	Ties	PF	PA	Playoff record	Notes
1986	Friendlies only	0	0	1	12	12		Vs Stevenage Aerostars
1987	United Kingdom Football League Championship	12	0	0	299	21	Runners-up losing 28–26 in the final to St.Helens Cardinals	
1988	Budweiser Division 1 Championship	9	1	0	456	84	Runners-up losing 48–34 in the final to Herts Phantoms	
1989	British National Gridiron League Division 1	7	2	1	216	54	Runners-up losing 18–9 in the final to Norwich Devils	
1990	British National Gridiron League Division 1	9	1	0	256	77	National champions beating the Clydesdale Colts 34–22	
1991	British National Gridiron League Division 1	6	2	1	279	130	Semi-finalists losing 50–0 to the London Capitals	
1992	BNGL National Division South/East Midlands Conference	5	5	0	217	213		
1993	BNGL Division Midlands Conference	5	5	0	150	95		
1994	BAFA Division 2 South Eastern Conference	1	9	0	81	267		Relegated to Division 3
1995	BAFA Division 3 East Midlands Conference	3	7	0	86	207		
1996	British Senior League Division 3	8	2	0	261	61	Quarter-finalists losing 14–0 to Winchester Rifles	
1997	BSL Division 1 South East / Midlands Conference	4	6	0	151	177		
1998	BSL Division 1 South East Conference	4	6	0	145	248		
1999	BSL Division 1 South East Conference	2	6	0	84	126		Relegated to Division 2
2000	British Senior League Division 2 Championship	8	0	0	297	48	Runners-up losing 41–7 in the final to Farnham Knights	
2001	British Senior League Division 2 Championship	5	2	1	172	91	Division Champions beating the Norwich Devils 47–15	Promoted to Division 1
2002	British Senior League Division 1	6	4	0	201	116	losing 14–3 to Birmingham Bulls	
2003	British Senior League Division 1	4	4	0	137	67	Semi-finalists losing 12–7 to East Kilbride Pirates	
2004	British Senior League Division 1	5	4	0	199	170	Wildcard round losing 46–0 to London O's	
2005	British Senior League Division 1	3	6	0	86	201		
2006	British American Football League Division 1A	4	6	0	165	334	Semi-finalists losing 20–7 to Bristol Aztecs	
2007	BAFL Division 1 Championship	8	2	0	230	109	Runners-up losing 47–7 in the final to Farnham Knights	
2008	BAFL Division 1 South Conference	5	5	0	167	175		
2009	BAFL Division 1 South East Conference	3	7	0	175	219		
2010	BAFACL Division 1 South East Conference	8	2	0	215	99	Semi-finalists losing 34–10 to East Kilbride Pirates	
2011	BAFANL Division 1 South East Conference	6	3	1	242	172	Quarter-finalists losing 14–7 to London O's	
2012	BAFANL Premier Division South	2	8	0	43	318		
2013	BAFANL Premier Division South	0	10	0	41	380		Relegated to National Division
2014	BAFANL National Division - South East Conference	2	8	0	70	412		
2015	BAFA Southern Football Conference Division 2 - East	1	9	0	124	432		
2016	BAFA Southern Football Conference Division 2 - East	0	10	0	91	290		
2017	BAFA Southern Football Conference Division 2 - East	1	9	0	118	309		
2018	BAFA Southern Football Conference Division 2 - East	6	2	0	199	168	Quarter-finalists losing 44-14 to Hertfordshire Cheetahs	
2019	BAFA Southern Football Conference Division 2 - East	4	2	2	-	-	Quarter-finalists losing 20-0 to Essex Spartans	
2020	BAFA Southern Football Conference Division 2 - East	-	-	-	-	-	Season postponed due to the Covid-19 Pandemic	
2021	BAFA Southern Football Conference Division 2 - East	3	5	0	-	-		

== Rivalries ==
Ipswich has a long-standing sporting rivalry with Norwich, which extends to American football. Games between the Ipswich Cardinals and the Norwich Devils are typically competitive and attract interest as part of the wider rivalry between the two cities.

Other local rivalries are with Colchester Gladiators and the Essex Spartans.

== Logo and uniforms ==
=== Logo ===
The Logo worn on the helmet was originally a cardinal's head, then the "Fighting Cardinal" (a representation of Cardinal Wolsey) which was designed by Mark Ayers, the first quarterback. Kevin Davies took it to an artist at the Port of Felixstowe to refine it.

=== Early days ===
The original uniform first adopted by the Cardinals was a blue helmet with the cardinals head, white with blue and red numbers home shirt, blue with white and red numbers away shirt, red pants.then red shirts white numbers away, white with red numbers home shirts, white pants . It is believed these colours were chosen as they matched the local football team Ipswich Town FC, it is not known however, when or why the team decided to abandon these colours in favour of their current ones.

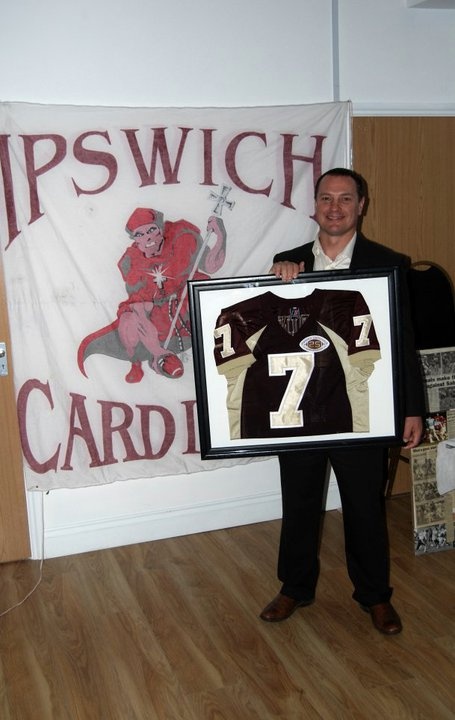
Cardinals Head Coach Ian Girling with his retired jersey

=== Pre-2007 ===
Later on the Cardinals switched to burgundy and gold for their helmets and home uniform, and all white for their away uniform. The helmets were gold with a central stripe of white flanked by two strips of burgundy. The jersey is burgundy and the pants gold.

The away uniform was white trimmed with red numbers and two red stripes on the arms.

=== Current uniform ===
The Cardinals current home uniform is made up of three colours; the primary colour is burgundy. The second is gold which runs from the base of the pants up the outside of the legs and follows onto the jersey before moving under the arms to the top of the shoulder, and is also the colour of the shirt numbers. The final colour is white which outlines the jersey numbers. The pants are burgundy with gold trim and the socks are white.

The away uniform is largely the same as the home with the only difference being that the burgundy jersey is replaced with a white jersey with burgundy numbering outlined by gold.

=== Retired numbers ===
At the end of the 2010 season Ralph Alexander, GM & Owner of the Ipswich Cardinals, made the decision to retire the club's first ever number. Head Coach Ian Girling has seen service with the organisation since its inception in 1985 first as a player in the Wide Receiver and Quarterback role, later as offensive coordinator and finally as the current Head Coach (As of 2010). In that time he has won 2 National titles and represented British American football in Europe. It was decided that a fitting way to recognise this outstanding commitment to the organisation was to retire his number from the team's roster. At the Cardinals' 25th anniversary party the GM presented the number 7 to Coach Girling and thanked him for all he has done to help make the team as strong as it is today.

Following the death of Defensive Lineman, Captain Christopher Butcher in October 2017 it was decided to retire his number 76 and a framed jersey was presented to his father, Terry Butcher.
