= Norwich Devils =

American football team based in the United Kingdom

General information
- Founded: 1984
- Stadium: Hell's Gate, Thorpe High School, Norwich
- Headquartered: Norwich, England
- Website: <http://www.norwichdevils.com/>

League / conference affiliations
- BAFACL Division 2 SFC 2 East

Championships
- League championships: 0; 1 (1989)
- Division championships: 0; 6 (1989, 1996, 2002, 2007, 2022, 2023)

Current uniform
Home

Away

The Norwich Devils are a British American football team based in Norwich, Norfolk.

== Overview ==
The Devils most recently fielded a team Division 2 East of the BAFA Community Leagues (BAFACL). The roster is mainly local players and they are currently on a recruitment campaign with the team having successfully completed its associate year in 2017. Since then the team rose from division 2 to the Division 1 South Final in 2023 losing out to Hertfordshire Cheetahs 28-6. However since then the team has been through a dip, dropping down to Division 2 after struggling in 2024 with an 0-8 season and entering a rebuilding phase in the hope of fighting back to Division 1.

The team was formed in 1984 and began league play in 1986. The Devils won their first, and to date only, National Championship later that decade in 1989, beating arch rivals the Ipswich Cardinals in the final by a score of 18–9. The Devils have made the playoffs 12 times since that national title and have won the National Division 2 Title twice since 2000, in 2002 & 2007.

The Norwich Devils Currently train and play their home games at Thorpe St Andrews High school in the east of Norwich. In Recent years they have also partaken in a preseason Game hosted at the RAF Lakenheath Air Force Base against Northants Knights known as Liberty Bowl.

== Rivalries ==
The Norwich Devils hold a hotly contested rivalry with Suffolk-based Ipswich Cardinals with the games between these two always being fiercely contested games. This rivalry spans across any sport in which Norwich and Ipswich teams contest with these two teams being no different with both teams always putting out their best to ensure bragging rights and in some cases division titles can be won for another year. In the past they have both played each other in championship matchups. The first of these was in 1989,where the Devils triumphed 18-9 in the British National Gridiron League Division 1 national championship. They then faced each other again in 2001 in the British Senior League Division 2 Championship where the Cardinals won 47-15. The Devil’s biggest victory against the Cardinals was in September 2021 when the Devils scored 9 touchdowns with their defence shutting out the Cardinals to make the final score 63-0 to the Devils. These two teams will on again face each other in 2025 both being placed in the SFC 2 East conference after not facing each other for 2 years due to Norwich's stint in Division however the last time these 2 teams played was the 15th May 2022 in which the Ipswich Cardinals won 8-12 which was Norwich's only loss in the regular season that year.

== Norwich Devils Hall of Fame ==
Name	Year of Induction	Notes
Tony Ryan	2008	Inducted for his long-standing services to the club as a player. Played a significant role in the Devils 1989 National Championship team and was still with the club for their first undefeated season in 2002.
Wayne Persinger	2008	Inducted for his services to the club as a coach and member of the management team. The club's first head coach who also established & ran the club's management structure.
Pete Wrigley	2007	Inducted for his services to the club as a player and a coach. An offensive lineman on the team's 1989 National Championship; the Devils head coach for 9 seasons, registering 5 playoff appearances in those 9 season including an undefeated 12–0 season in 2002 to take the National Division 2 Championship.

== Senior team season records ==
Season	Division	Wins	Losses	Ties	PF	PA	Final position	Playoff record
1986	British American Football League – Anglian Division	5	5	0	254	204	4 / 5	—
1987	Budweiser League Division One Eastern Conference	7	3	0	169	79	2 / 6	—
1988	Budweiser League Division One Eastern Conference	5	5	0	388	195	3 / 5	—
1989	British National Gridiron League Division 1	9	1	0	209	78	1 / 6	National Champions beating Ipswich Cardinals 18–9; Beat Harrogate Hawks 36–16 in Semi-final
1990	British National Gridiron League Division 1	2	8	0	66	270	6 / 6	—
1991	British National Gridiron League Division 1	0	10	0	84	321	5 / 5	—
1992	British National Gridiron League East Midlands Division	6	3	1	228	107	3 / 6	—
1993	British National Gridiron League Southeast Division	2	8	0	109	258	4 / 4	—
1994	BAFA Division 3 Midlands Conference	1	9	0	99	355	6 / 6	—
1995	BAFA Division 3 East Midlands Conference	5	5	0	137	191	4 / 5	—
1996	British Senior League Division 3 Southeast Conference	10	0	0	232	57	1 / 6	Quarter-finalists losing 48–25 to Tiger Bay Warriors
1997	British Senior League Division 1 Southeast & Midlands Conference	6	3	1	130	92	2 / 6	Quarter-finalists losing 20–0 to Nottingham Caesars
1998	British Senior League Division 1 Southeast Conference	7	3	0	133	178	2 / 6	Quarter-finalists losing 22–21 to Bristol Aztecs
1999	British Senior League Division 1 Eastern Conference	2	6	0	80	209	4 / 4	—
2000	British Senior League Division 2 Eastern Conference	6	2	0	230	89	2 / 5	Quarter-finalists losing 12–11 to Redditch Arrows
2001	British Senior League Division 2 South Conference	7	0	1	210	75	2 / 9	Division 2 runners up, losing final to Ipswich Cardinals 47–15; Beat Lancashire Wolverines 34–20 in Semi-final; Beat Yorkshire Rams 17–10 in Quarter final
2002	British Senior League Division 2 South Conference	9	0	0	271	38	1 / 9	Division 2 Champions beating Yorkshire Rams 17–14; Beat Plymouth Admirals 23–0 in Semi-final; Glasgow Tigers forfeited Quarter final
2003	British Senior League Division 1 South Conference	0	8	0	6	347	5 / 5	—
2004	British Senior League Division 1A South Conference	1	9	0	36	287	4 / 4	—
2005	BAFL Division 2 South East Conference	2	7	1	156	264	4 / 5	—
2006	BAFL Division 2 East Conference	7	2	1	210	124	2 / 4	Quarter-finalists losing 35–14 to Sussex Thunder; Beat Colchester Gladiators 32–14 in Wildcard Round
2007	BAFL Division 2 South East Conference	10	0	0	224	46	1 / 6	Division 2 Champions beating Dundee Hurricanes 26–12; Beat South Wales Warriors 43–28 in Semi-finals; Beat Cornish Sharks 26–18 in quarter-final
2008	BAFL Division 1 South Conference	1	8	1	104	241	6 / 6	—
2009	BAFL Division 1 South East Conference	0	9	1	84	417	6 / 6	—
2010	BAFL Division 2 East Conference	6	4	0	148	155	4 / 6	—
2018	BAFL SFC 2 East	5	3	0	191	188	3 / 6	Quarter-finalists losing 50-0 to London Blitz B
2019	BAFL SFC 2 East	6	1	1	129	77	2 / 6	Quarter-finalists losing 30-6 to Bournemouth Bobcats
2021	East Anglia	4	4	0	214	137	3/5	
2022	BAFACL SFC 2 East	7	1	0	205	69	1/4	Quarter-finalists losing 32-6 to Bristol Apache
2023	BAFACL SFC 1 Central	7	3	0	302	150	1/6	South Play-off Finalists losing 28-6 to Hertfordshire Cheetahs Beat Bournemouth Bobcats 30-7 in Semi-finals
2024	BAFACL SFC 1 East	0	8	0	32	290	5/5	
2025	BAFACL SFC 2 East	1	7	0	54	180	4/4	
—	All-Time Team Record	145	138	8	5070	5588	—	12–8
