= Ouse Valley Eagles =

American football team based in the United Kingdom

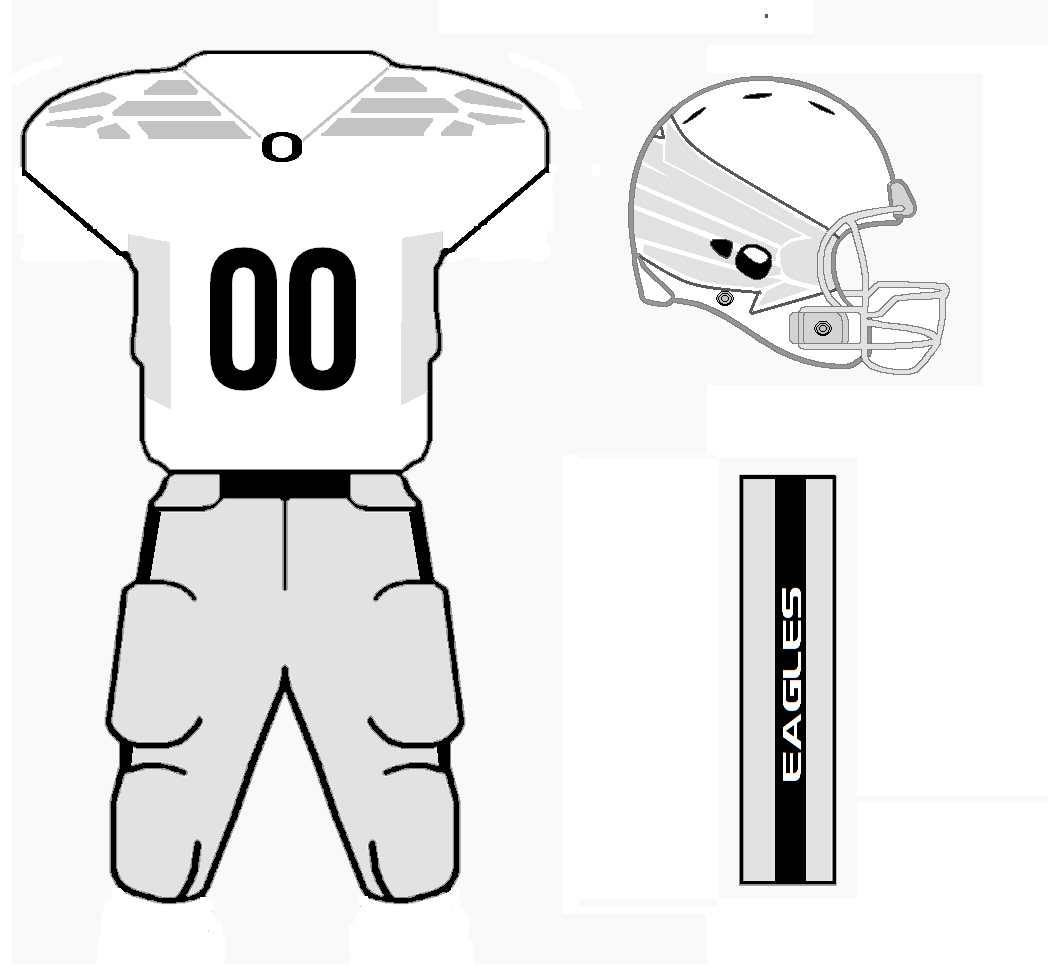
Uniforms

General information
- Founded: 2013; 13 years ago
- Stadium: Bedford Athletic Rugby Club
- Headquartered: Bedford

Personnel
- Head coach: Nick Benning

League / conference affiliations
- BAFA National Leagues; 2 - conference SFC 2 East

The Ouse Valley Eagles are a British American football team based in Bedford, United Kingdom. They play their home games at the Bedford Athletic Rugby Club. They are a member of the BAFA National Leagues Division 2, playing in the southern football conference (SFC 2 East).

The Eagles formed in 2013 after a merger of the local rivals, the Bedfordshire Blue Raiders and the Milton Keynes Pathfinders.

== History ==
=== Milton Keynes Pathfinders ===
The Pathfinders were formed in their first guise as a youth flag football team, but only began participation in senior kitted football in 2006, before joining the BAFL in 2008. They played their home games at the Emerson Valley Sports Pavilion in Milton Keynes.

Their first match was in 2006, away to the Cambridgeshire Cats and was followed by a 0–35 defeat at home to the Bedfordshire Blue Raiders, at the time, another associate team looking to join the league.

In their first season as a league team, they posted a 0-9-1 record, conceding 445 points, the highest total since the 464 points conceded by the Andover Thrashers in 2005.

In 2011, they recorded their first ever winning season, going 7-2-1, which saw them clinch the final Division 2 playoff spot, losing to eventual finalists, the West Coast Trojans. They reached the playoffs again in the final season in 2012, this time reaching the Southern Final, before losing to the Peterborough Saxons.

Their overall regular season league record at the time of the merger with Bedfordshire was 25-34-2, with a post season record of 1-2.

=== Bedfordshire Blue Raiders ===
The Blue Raiders were formed in 2006 by locals Dave Pankhurst and Steve Guy, and began the BAFL associate process in 2007. They played their first game against Maidstone Pumas, winning 18-8. One month after their first contest with the Pathfinders, they were accepted into the league. The Blue Raiders were placed in the Eastern Conference of Division Two.

By 2013, lack of interest lead to reduced player participation, and the squad size was approximately half of that which started the season, with no healthy quarterbacks. This meant that the Blue Raiders had to forfeit a game against the Kent Exiles, and ruined their chances of appearing in another playoff game. They only managed to fulfill their final fixture by registering coaches as players.

Their overall regular season league record at the time of the merger with Milton Keynes was 32-30 with a post season record of 0-1.

=== Merger ===
At the end of the Bedfordshire Blue Raiders' final game, an EGM was called to discuss the future of the club going forward. Neale McMaster stepped forward as chairman, and proposed a merger with the Pathfinders.

On 3 November 2013, a joint EGM was called by both clubs, and the constitution and articles of merger were approved by all in attendance.

=== Recent years ===
The Eagles began their inaugural season in 2014, under the guidance of Head Coach Will White. They lost their first game to the Watford Cheetahs 19-0. However, they easily won their second game to the rookie London Hornets, finishing 37-0. In their first season's penultimate game, the Eagles beat the Kent Exiles in a game that would see the winning team reach the playoffs. After finishing the regular season 8-2, they lost to the Solent Thrashers in the first round.

Going into their second season, a league realignment saw them placed in the Division One Southern Football Conference, in the North division.

== Logos and uniforms ==
Their "O" logo and uniforms are heavily inspired by that of the Oregon Ducks. Their logo features a bold "O" contained by wing graphics.

Their first jerseys are manufactured by DNA Sports. They are primarily white, with silver wing details on the shoulders and black uniform numbers. Their helmets are white and also feature the chrome wing design.

== Bedford Athletic Rugby Club ==
The Eagles play their home games at Bedford Athletic Rugby Club, home of Bedford Ath, Bedford Queens and Bedford Tigers.

== Season-by-season record ==
Year	Division	Record
2017	BAFA Division One Central	4-6-0
2016	BAFA Division One MFC	4-6-0
2015	BAFA Division One SFC North	7-3-0*
2014	BAFA Division One South	8–2–0*
* qualified for playoffs
