= Crawley Raiders =

The Crawley Raiders were a south coast UK-based American Football Club founded in 1984 They were one of the founding clubs in UK American Football and continued to play competitive league football until they merged with the Brighton B52's in 1997 to form the Sussex Thunder. The Raiders played at many different home grounds during their history, including two spells at Bewbush Leisure Centre, Crawley Leisure Centre and also Crawley Rugby Club. Their first home game was against the Walthamstow Warriors, with the Raiders losing narrowly in front of a large and enthusiastic crowd.

They reached the UK American Football finals twice in their history, losing both times, firstly to the Merseyside Nighthawks and then the Cambridge County Cats. Notable players and coaches in the history of the club included Fitzroy Miller (RB), Martin Turner (OL), Gus Romain (RB), Steve Henry (RB), ex-GB Sprinter Jason Livingston (RB), Malcolm Bamsey (WR), Andy Hall (WR and K), Paul Allison (QB), Barry Spencer (QB), John Lloyd (LB), Ron Robinson (DL), Phil Rickards (DE), Ian Ellis (S) and Jerry Mannagh (HC).
