= Manchester Titans =

American football team based in the United Kingdom

- Founded: 2003; 23 years ago
- League: BAFA National Leagues
- Division: Premier Division North
- Location: Gorton, Manchester
- Stadium: National Speedway Stadium
- Colours: Blue Helmets; Home: Blue with white trim Jerseys with blue pants Away: White with Blue trim Jerseys with white pants
- Head coach: George Foster
- General manager: Liam Twigg
- Division titles: 8: 2009, 2015, 2017, 2022, 2023, 2024, 2025, 2026
- Playoff berths: 7: 2009, 2015, 2016, 2017, 2018, 2019, 2022
- BritBowl titles: 2: 2022, 2023
- Website: www.manchestertitans.co.uk/

The Manchester Titans are an American football team based in Manchester, England, that competes in the BAFA National Leagues Premier Division North.

== History ==
The Manchester Titans American Football Club was established in 2003. Led by Lee Morton and Rik Lowthion, a group of local players from Manchester decided to establish the team because Manchester had no local team at the time. The team name was inspired by the film Remember the Titans.

Starting in Division 2, the team had playoff runs in 2005, 2007 and 2009 and 2010. In 2010 they reached the D2 National Final where they lost to the London Olympians side 35-13. The team returned to D2 but achieved promotion to D1 again in 2015. In 2017 a group of players and coaches who had previously been part of the Titans returned, and the team entered the Premier Division. They defeated the London Olympians in the National Final 46-23.

In 2014, the Club added an Adult Flag Team and Women's Team.
