= Oxford Saints =

American football team in the United Kingdom

- Founded: 1983; 43 years ago
- League: BAFA National Leagues
- Division: SFC 1 Central
- Location: Abingdon-on-Thames, Oxfordshire
- Stadium: Tilsley Park
- Colours: Primary: White helmets, White jerseys, Navy pants Alternative: White helmets, Navy jerseys, Navy pants
- Chairman: Sam Stancombe
- Head coach: Greg Kennedy
- League titles: 4: 1995, 2006, 2016, 2025
- Website: www.oxfordsaints.com

Oxford Saints American Football Club is a British American football club that competes in the BAFANL (British American Football Association National League). Currently the team competes at senior level (18+ mixed contact) and operates five youth teams (U11 flag, U14 flag, U17 flag, U16 contact, and U19 contact)

The club is based in Abingdon and plays at Tilsley Park in Oxfordshire. Games are played at weekends from April through August.

Set up in 1983, Oxford Saints are one of the oldest American football teams in the UK. The Oxford Saints Women's American Football team operated from May 2016 until 2019.

== History ==
=== Early years ===
Founded by Steve Abbott in 1983, they started as the Oxford Eagles but following a Radio Oxford phone-in competition the team was renamed Oxford Bulldogs.

As American football's popularity increased the first British league was formed, and in 1985 Bulldogs officially joined the AFL. Bulldogs finished their first season with an 8–1–1 record, being defeated by the London Ravens at the quarter-final stage of the playoffs. Homes games were played at Cuttelsowe Park and the Whitehouse Ground (home of Oxford City FC).

In 1989, the Bulldogs were joined by local rivals Abingdon Pharaohs, strengthening the squad and broadening its fan base.

=== 1992–1999 ===
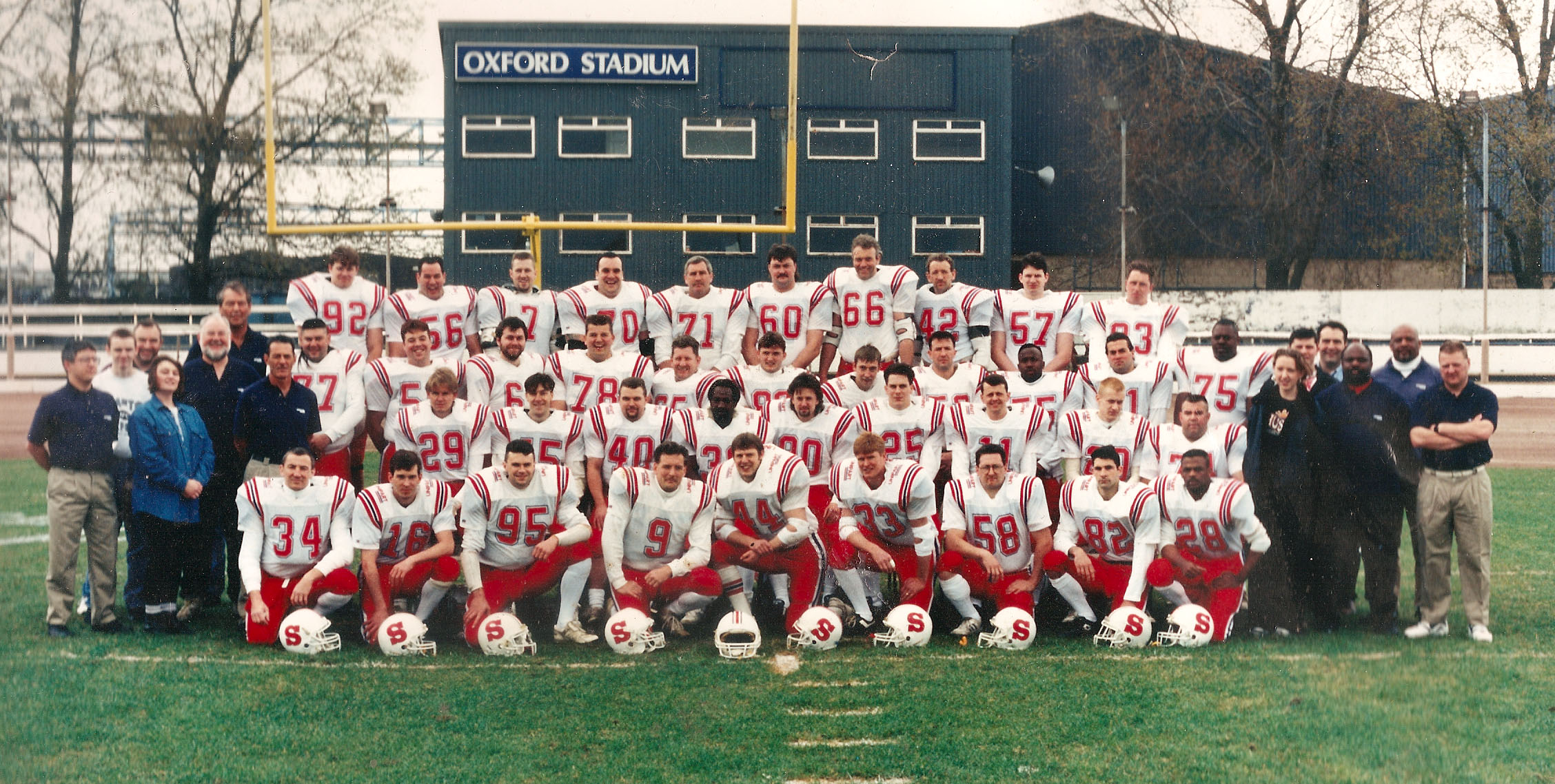
The championship winning Oxford Saints side of 1995

In 1992 the Oxford Bulldogs changed name to the Oxford Saints. Driven forward by general manager Roger Hedges, the club secured a major sponsorship deal and moved to a new home at the Oxford Stadium in Cowley.

Prior to the 1994 season, Coach Steve Conner returned to the US. Richard Emerick, another experienced US coach, was appointed as his replacement.

During 1995, the Saints made the playoffs and defeated the Invicta Eagles in the first round, along with victories over London Blitz and Colchester Gladiators. In the final, Oxford faced the Gwent Mustangs at Leicester's Saffron Lane Stadium and claimed a 14–6 victory and championship title.

In 1997 the Saints were on course for another appearance in the final round following a 9–1 season, but were defeated by the Nottingham Caesars in the semi-final.

=== 2000–2005 ===
A 7–1 campaign in 2000 was followed by an 8–0 season in 2001, both ending in semi finals at the hands of the PA Knights and Ipswich Cardinals respectively. After a poor 2002 season Coach Janes moved upstairs as Director of Football and Phil DeMonte took over as head coach.

Coach DeMonte stayed at Saints for one season but the team made the playoffs, eventually beaten by the Gateshead Senators. The Saints raced through the newly formed BAFL division 2 in 2005 with a 9–1 record, ending the season with a loss to Kent Exiles.

=== 2006–2009 ===
With the experienced Wayne Mayers at quarterback, and the power running game of Chris Taylor the Saints powered through the 2006 season with a 9–1 record. The Saints came from behind to beat West Coast Trojans, 29–28, and clinched the Division 2 Title.

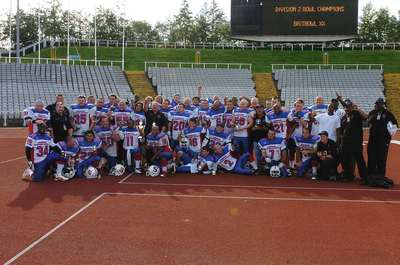
The 2006 Division 2 winning Oxford Saints team

Promoted to BAFL Division 1 in 2007, the Saints finished 6–4 and 4–5–1 in 2008.

In 2009, Len Scott and former London Olympian Matt Coppinger boosted the offensive coaching staff with defensive back Nick Wykes returning as player-coach after a three-year hiatus. Former Saint and PA Knight Steve Belcher returned at wide receiver and kicker, providing the highlight of the season when he landed a record 57-yard field goal as time expired to defeat Birmingham Bulls in week 7.

Saints' hopes of a conference crown were dashed in the final game of the regular season by the Tamworth Phoenix. The season was concluded with a defeat by Cambridge Cats.

An 8–2 mark represented huge progress and also a swan song for head coach Chris Janes, who retired from active coaching and assumed the role of general manager.

=== 2010–2013 ===
Len Scott took over as head coach and reinforced the roster. The defense was bolstered with the addition of Dean Bryan, Adam Cartwright and Clive Russell, while the offense, with coordinator Matt Coppinger, featured rookie running back Kyle Micallef alongside brothers Jay and Chris Taylor, and a growing group of young British talent.

Competing again in the South West conference of Division 1, Saints had a strong start before running into the Premiership-bound Phoenix, and defeated all but the Tamworth-based outfit en route to a 7–3 record and a second straight playoff contest against Cambridge. The Saints were stopped short of reaching the semi-finals in a 13–7 defeat to the Cambridge Cats.

2010 and 2011 proved to be difficult years for the Saints due to various changes in the coaching staff and the departure of Head Coach Len Scott. During this time Chris Janes became the interim head coach before Andrew Day was officially appointed to the role.

=== 2014–present ===
In 2014, Chairman John Farley retired from his role and Martin Fitzpatrick took over, with a mostly new committee.

The Saints won their first four games before suffering back-to-back losses by the Shropshire Revolution and a loss by the Lincolnshire Bombers. The team finished the season with a 7–3 record, missing out on the playoffs due to losing a tie breaker condition between Oxford and Shropshire.

2015 saw further strong recruitment and a league realignment. With new quarterback Ben Denton, they ended the regular season with a 6–2 record and reached the quarter-finals. A week before the quarter-final game against Sussex Thunder, quarterback Ben Denton was diagnosed with leukemia. The Saints lost to the Thunder in the opening round.

During the offseason, chairman Martin Fitzpatrick stepped down from the role and vice-chairman Andrew Peart was voted in as his successor at the 2015 Annual General Meeting.

Peart coordinated the relocation of home games to Tilsley Park in Abingdon, with improved facilities for players and spectators. Peart has also laid the foundations for the Oxford Saints Women's team which began training in May 2016.

Notable additions to the 2016 roster include American nationals Destin Maulding (QB/WR), Bilal Redd (FS), Marlon Mason (CB and Eric Mendoza (LB). Further in the season, Tony Glover (RB) also joined the squad.

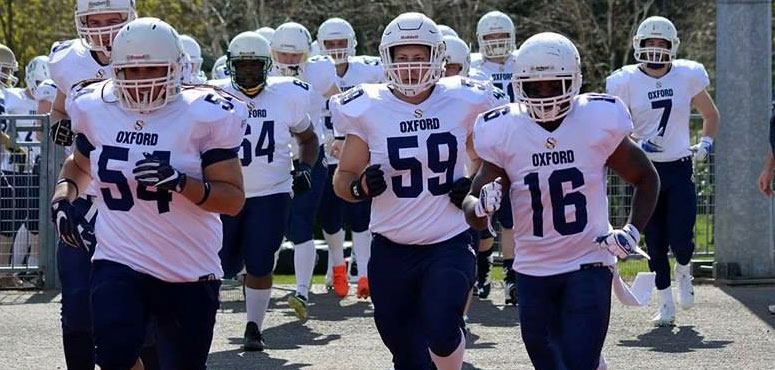
Oxford Saints in 2017

In August 2016, Ben Denton (QB) returned to the field for the first time after being diagnosed with leukemia in 2015.

In the 2016 playoffs, the Saints had home advantage and defeated the Cornish Sharks and Bristol Apache. The Saints progressed to the Division II Southern Final against the Cambridgeshire Cats and won 24–2, on 11 September at John Charles Stadium in Leeds.

At the end of the 2016 season, chairman Andrew Peart stood down and vice-chairman Graeme Taylor was elected to the leading role.

== Oxford Saints Hall of Fame ==
Oxford Saints constituted their Hall of Fame in 2008.
Inductees:

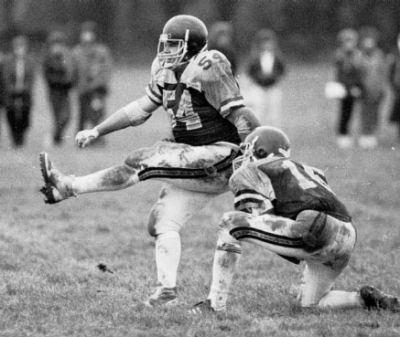
Founder – Steve Abbott

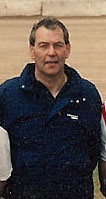
GM – Roger Hedges

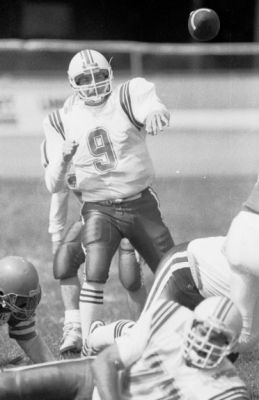
QB – BJ Johnson

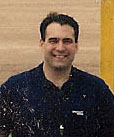
HC – Steve Conner

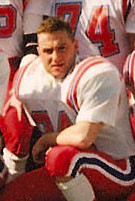
RB – Billy McMahon

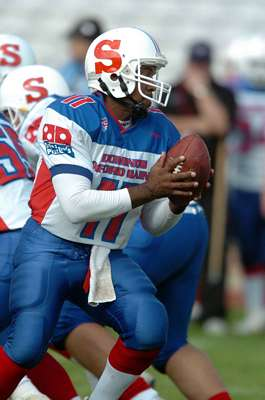
QB – Wayne Mayers

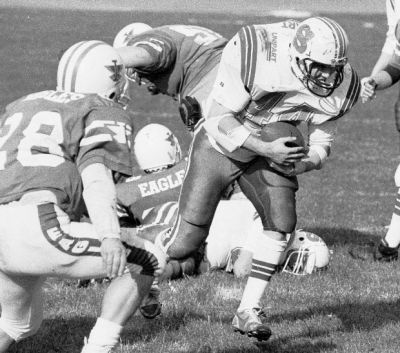
RB/LB – Nick Whitford

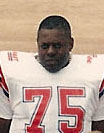
OL – Everett McLean

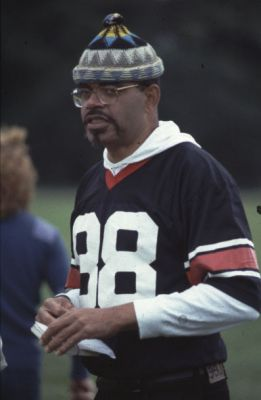
HC – Pete Cole

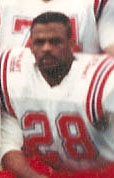
CB – Scott Grady

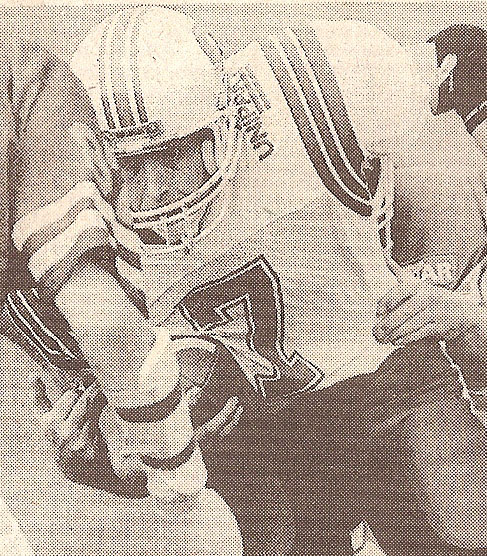
RB – Jason Lowe

S – Iain Noakes

Not Pictured:

- RB - Chris Taylor
- Com – Pam Hedges
- LB – Richard Davies
- RB – Gary Walker
- OL – STC David Creese
- DL – Morris Coleman
- LB – Andrew Day
- HC – Chris Janes
- OL – Paul Arnold
- FB – Brian Myers
- DL – Morris Coleman
- LB/FB – Troy Smith
- DE/FB – Chris Day
- LB/TE – Paul Whitford
- DE – Lee Hutton

== Past record ==
Year	League	Div	Conf.	Reg. season	Playoffs
1984	Merit Table	N/A	N/A	3–0	N/A
1985	A.F.L.	N/A	South West	8–1–1	QF
1986	Budweiser League	Premier	Central	2–7–1	N/A
1987	Budweiser League	Premier	Central	8–2	QF
1988	Budweiser League	Premier	S.London & West	6–4	N/A
1989	Combined Gridiron League	Crown National	Central	4–6	N/A
1990	NCMMA		Central	4–6	N/A
1991	British National Gridiron	Premier	Midlands	9–1	QF
1992	British National Gridiron	National	SE Midlands	8–2	QF
1993	British National Gridiron	National	Midlands	5–4–1	QF
1994	British National Gridiron	National	South East	6–4	N/A
1995	British National Gridiron	Div 3	South Central	6–3–1	CHAMPIONS
1996	British National Gridiron	Div 2	South	5–4–1	N/A
1997	British National Gridiron	Div 1	South/West Midlands	9–1	SF
1998	British National Gridiron	Div 1	South West	5–5	QF
1999	British National Gridiron	Div 1	South West	2–7–1	N/A
2000	British Senior League	Div 2	South West	7–1	SF
2001	British Senior League	Div 2	Southern	8–0	SF
2002	British Senior League	Div 2	Southern	3–7	N/A
2003	British Senior League	Div 2	South/West	6–4	QF
2004	British Senior League	Div 2	South/West	4–5–1	SF
2005	BAFL	Div 2	South/West	9–1	QF
2006	BAFL	Div 2	South/West	9–1	CHAMPIONS
2007	BAFL	Div 1	South	6–4	N/A
2008	BAFL	Div 1	South	4–5–1	N/A
2009	BAFL	Div 1	South West	8–2	QF
2010	BAFACL	Div 1	South West	7–3	QF
2011	BAFACL	Div 1	South West	–	N/A
2012	BAFANL	Div 1	South West		SF
2013	BAFANL	National Division	South West	4–6	N/A
2014	BAFANL	National Division	Central	7–3	N/A
2015	BAFANL	Division II	South West	6–2	QF
2016	BAFANL	Division II	South West	13–0	CHAMPIONS
2017	BAFANL	Division I	South Central	5–5	N/A
2019	BAFANL	Division I	South West	2–8	N/A
2021	BAFANL		Thames Valley	1–7	N/A
2022	BAFANL	Division I	South West	2–7–1	N/A
2023	BAFANL	Division I	South West	1–9	N/A
2024	BAFANL	Division I	South Central	0–8	N/A
2025	BAFANL	Division II	South East	8-2	CHAMPIONS
2026	BAFANL	Division I	South Central	8-1	QF
