= London Blitz (American football) =

American Football team based in the United Kingdom

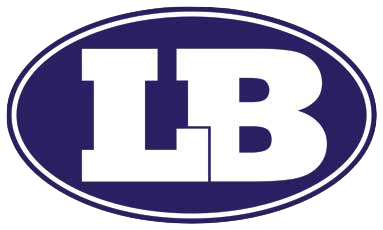
- Founded: 1995; 31 years ago
- League: BAFA National Leagues
- Division: Premier Division South
- Location: Finsbury Park, London
- Stadium: Finsbury Park Stadium
- Colours: White Helmets, White and Navy Blue Jerseys, Navy Blue Pants
- Head coach: Rob Smith
- General manager: Freddy Clapson
- Division titles: 7: 1995, 2005, 2007, 2009, 2010, 2011, 2017
- Playoff berths: 19: 1995, 1996, 1999, 2005, 2006, 2007, 2008, 2009, 2010, 2011, 2012, 2013, 2014, 2015, 2016, 2017, 2018, 2019,2026
- BritBowl titles: 5: 2007, 2009, 2010, 2011, 2012
- EFAF Cup titles: 1: 2011
- Website: https://www.londonblitzfootballclub.com/

The London Blitz, previously known as the Ealing Eagles and Hayes Generals, are an American football team based in Finsbury Park, England, who compete BAFA National Leagues Premier Division South. They were formed in 1994 and operate from Finsbury Park Athletics Stadium.

== History ==
The Ealing Eagles were one of the original American football teams in the United Kingdom. The Eagles merged with the Working Generals, becoming the Hayes Generals for the 1994 season. The chose a new name in 1995, officially becoming the London Blitz.

The London Blitz run a pay-to-play model and have under-17, under-19, and senior teams. The London Blitz won Britbowl for the first time in 2007. In 2011, The Guardian described the London Blitz as "a dominant force in the British game".

== See also ==
- British American Football League
- BAFA National Leagues
