= East Kilbride Pirates =

American Football team based in the United Kingdom

- Founded: 1985; 40 years ago
- League: BAFA National Leagues
- Division: Premier North
- Location: Glasgow, Scotland
- Stadium: Braidholm
- Colours: Black Helmet; Black and Red Jersey; Red Pants
- Head coach: Matthew Davies
- General manager: Amanda McDonald
- League titles: 2 (2011, 2022)
- Division titles: 12: (2001, 2002, 2003, 2004, 2009, 2010, 2011, 2012, 2013, 2014, 2015, 2022)
- Playoff berths: 19: 1995, 1997, 1998, 2000, 2001, 2002, 2003, 2004, 2005, 2006, 2009, 2010, 2011, 2012, 2013, 2014, 2015, 2019, 2022)
- Website: www.piratesfootball.co.uk

The East Kilbride Pirates are an American football team based in Glasgow, Scotland, who compete in the BAFA National Leagues Premier North, the highest level of British American football. The club although formed in East Kilbride currently operate in Glasgow and play their home games at Braidholm. They are both the most successful and the oldest surviving American Football team in Scotland having been formed in 1985. The club has won Division 1 National titles in 2011 and 2022 and are eleven-time Divisional champions.

== History ==
The East Kilbride Pirates were formed in 1985, following a notice appearing in the local newspaper asking any interested parties to attend training. For the 1986 season, the Pirates merged with the nearby Rutherglen Ironhogs, producing a suitably sized squad to take part in the British American Football League (Anglo Conference). A 13–0 win was recorded over the Clydesdale Colts in the first kitted game.

1987 saw a new head coach with the appointment of Bill Walsh, an American working in East Kilbride. East Kilbride went 4–4 to finish second in Division One of the new Budweiser American Football League.

In 2013, the team announced plans for a Junior team, to compete in the 16–19 age range and bridge the gap between Youth and Senior. In 2019, the team finished their regular season 6–0, and won a semi-final 13–9 against Birmingham Lions to qualify for their third appearance at the British U19 final in four years. The game was streamed by BBC Sport.

In September 2015 the East Kilbride Pirates launched their first women's team. The call for players met with a positive local response and the team competed in the British American Football Association's Opal Series flag competition for women. The Pirates women's team compete in the Opal flag and Sapphire kitted competitions. In 2017 the women's section split into distinct contact and flag teams. In 2018 the club appointed Claire Cochrane as their first ever female head coach to lead the women's contact team.
