= Gateshead Senators =

American Football team based in the United Kingdom

Gateshead Senators
Year formed	Pre 1985 as Newcastle Browns, moved to Gateshead in 1988
Team colours	White, green and orange
Home field	Monkton Stadium, Jarrow, South Tyneside
Conference alignment	National Division (North Conference)
Head coach	Gary Marshall
BritBowl Championships (0)
Divisional Championships (3); 1999, 2006, 2013
Playoff Appearances (9); 1999, 2000, 2001, 2002, 2003, 2004, 2005, 2006, 2013, 2023, 2024

Gateshead Senators are a British American football Team based in South Tyneside at Monkton Stadium.

== Origins ==
The Senators started life in the 1980s as the Newcastle Senators, rising out of the ashes of the aptly named Newcastle Browns, and playing at Northern Rugby Club in Newcastle. The club had two very successful seasons winning the Division 1 title with a 10–0 record and gained promotion to the National Division for the following season.

The Senators gained new players when the area's only other team, the Trojans, folded. In the National Division the team had a 4–6 record and gained the respect of many of the country's top sides.

In 1988, the Senators moved across the Tyne to Gateshead International Stadium. With this move the club also changed its name to the Gateshead International Senators, cementing the links with the stadium and giving them the nickname the GIs.

New players came from around the region, including many from the Tyneside Tigers, who were experiencing difficulties. In 1995, the end of the Stockton Gators led to further influx of new and experienced players, ready for the 1996 campaign.

== The club today ==
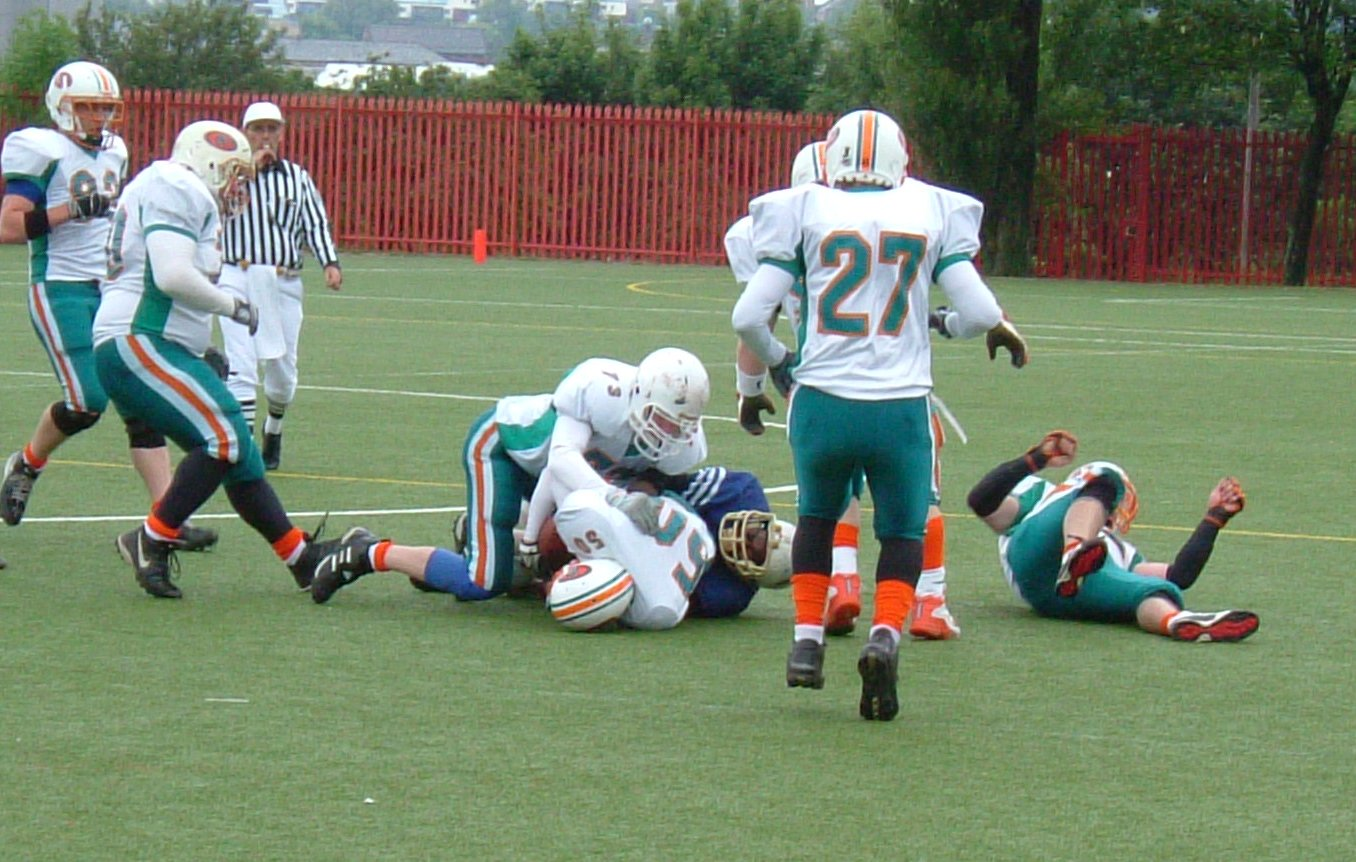
Senators in action v Staffordshire surge, 25 June 2006

The team has players from Newcastle, Gateshead, Sunderland, Washington, Darlington, Teesside and Durham.

The most successful year for the team was 1999, going all the way and winning the Division 1 title.

In 2000, 2001 and 2002, the Senators again reached the playoffs, but could not go all the way again. The team moved to Division 2 for 2003 because of player retirements and the need to rebuild but this sparked a rebirth, and the team went 10–0 in 2003 and reached the semi-final. The Senators were promptly returned to Division 1 and remain one of the UK's top clubs, and always a serious contender, reaching the playoffs in every subsequent season until 2007 and now after league reorganisation, remain in the top flight, playing in the Premier Division. Despite their poor record in 2007, the club retained its place in the Premier Division for 2008.

The team opted to compete in the National Division in 2013, and advanced all the way to the Britbowl National Final, losing out to the Colchester Gladiators at John Charles Stadium, Leeds. It was a successful season however, as Gateshead twice defeated local rivals the DC Presidents in the regular season, as well as the Merseyside Nighthawks and Chester Romans in the play-offs on their way to the National Final. The Senators will once again compete in the Premier Division for the 2014 season.

== Historic results ==
2013 National Division (North) 8–1–1*
2007 BAFL Premier 3–6–1
2006 BAFL Division 1 North 8–2*
2005 BAFL Division 1 North 8–2*
2004 BAFL Division 1 North 6–2–1*
2003 BAFL Division 2 North 10–0*
2002 BAFL Division 1 North 5–5*
2001 BAFL Division 1 North 5–3*
2000 BAFL Division 1 North 5–3*

*made playoffs

== Youth team ==
Senators' Youth Kitted Squad

The Senators offer a full youth programme, including fully kitted football catering for age groups 13 to 19. The Youth team have won two Northern Conference titles (2007 & 2008) they have gone on to represent the north of Britain vs the London warriors at Doncaster keepmoat stadium.

In 2011, the Youth team managed to get to the Final of the Brit Bowl, but were beaten by the London Blitz in Crystal Palace.

The Senators are providing a training scheme for flag football and there are training sessions at monkton Stadium and schools within the local area.

The Youth kitted team plays in the BAFA (British American Football Association) Youth League.

Flag football is a fast-growing, non-contact variant of American football, long popular in the US, and gaining in popularity in the UK. It means that young people can learn all about the game in safety.

== See also ==
- British American Football Association National Leagues
