= Lancashire Buccaneers =

American Football team based in the United Kingdom

Lancashire Bucaneers
- Founded: 1988; 38 years ago
- League: BAFA National Leagues
- Division: NFC 2 North
- Team history: Wigan Wolverines (1988–1989); Lancashire Chieftains (1986–1989); Lancashire Wolverines (1989–2025); Lancashire Bucaneers (2025–)
- Location: Preston, Lancashire
- Stadium: UCLAN Sports Arena
- Colours: Black Helmets, Grey Jerseys, Black Pants
- Head coach: Ian Nicholson
- Division titles: 2: 2011, 2012
- Playoff berths: 13: 1990, 1992, 1993, 1994, 1995, 1998, 2001, 2003, 2011, 2012, 2014, 2015, 2018
- Website: https://www.chorleybucs.co.uk/

The Lancashire Buccaneers, formerly known as the Lancashire Wolverines, are an American football team based in Preston, Lancashire, England, who compete in the BAFA National Leagues NFC 2 North, the third level of British American Football.

== History ==
The Lancashire Wolverines were established in 1988 and played in the BAFA before pulling out in 2004 and returning in 2011. The Wolverines went 9–1 in the 2011 season in division 2. They were beaten at the semi-final stage of the post season, but regardless of this were granted promotion to Division 1 North in a league reshuffle.

In 2016 the Wolverines started training camps in hopes to recruit young players to join the team. The Lancashire Wolverines merged with the Chorley Buccaneers in 2025 to form the Lancashire Buccaneers.
