= Sussex Thunder =

American Football team based in the United Kingdom

- Founded: 1997 & 2002
- Based in: England, East Sussex
- Home stadium: Haywards Heath Rugby Club (2024-Present)
- Division: Division 1 - Central
- Colors: Royal blue, red, white

Personnel
- Head coach: Billy Walker
- General manager: Samuel Oldfield

Championships
- League titles (0): 3
- Division titles (0): 3
- Website: https://www.sussexthunder.com

The Sussex Thunder are an American football team from England based in Sussex. The club entered the league for the first time in 1997 when the Crawley Raiders merged with local rivals the Brighton B52s to form a new club – Sussex Thunder under inaugural Head Coach Jim Jasicki. The Thunder reached the BritBowl Final in their second year led by current Head Coach Ian Ellis, narrowly losing to the London Olympians. Success continued to allude the club afterwards, but on 20 September 2008, led by Head Coach Len Scott, the Thunder won the Division 1 national championship in an overtime win against the Redditch Arrows.

Promotion to the BAFL Premier Division in 2009 saw the Thunder struggle to a losing season and the departure of two Head Coaches during that season (Len Scott and then Jim Roberson).

In November 2009, the Sussex Thunder appointed ex-San Francisco 49ers trialist Tony Stitt as head coach and under his guidance won promotion back to the Premier Division of the BAFA National Leagues. After two seasons in the Premier Division, the club returned to the BAFA National Leagues Division 1 South, and re-hired Ian Ellis. A Play-off run followed in 2011 (where they lost to the Birmingham bulls 14–13) before the club once again claimed the Division 1 National Championship in 2012.

Due to a large amount of senior player retirements, the Thunder withdrew from the league for the 2014 season and then entered the associate process to rejoin the league in the 2015 season. Membership was approved by the league and in 2015 the team re entered the Division 2 South East Conference. After a successful season in 2015 ending in a Semi Final defeat in Triple Overtime to eventual Division 2 Champions the Thunder were awarded promotion to Division 1 SFC South for 2016.

The Thunder were promoted to Division 1, SFC 1 Central prior to the beginning of the 2025-2026 season.

== Retired numbers ==
- 26 Andy Smythe
- 56 Adrian Teague

== Previous home grounds ==
Brighton Rugby Club, Brighton (2002-2004) Breezehurst Pavilion, Crawley (2005-2009) Broadbridge Heath Stadium (2010-2012) Brighton Rugby Club, Brighton (2013-2018) University of Sussex (2019-2023) Haywards Heath Rugby Club (2024–Present)
