= Bristol Aztecs =

American football team based in the UK

- Founded: 1990; 36 years ago
- League: BAFA National Leagues
- Division: Premiership (South Division)
- Location: Frenchay, Bristol
- Stadium: Shaftesbury Park (capacity: 2,000)
- Colours: Blue, Orange, White, Grey
- Owner: Bristol American Football Ltd.
- Managing director: Elliot Hoyte
- Head coach: Pete Jones
- General manager: John Matthews
- National championships: 2: (2025, 2026)
- Division titles: 5: (1997, 1999, 2005, 2006, 2026)
- Playoff berths: 21: (1993, 1995, 1997, 1998, 1999, 2003, 2004, 2005, 2006, 2007, 2008, 2009, 2010, 2011, 2013, 2014, 2022, 2023, 2024, 2025, 2026)
- Website: https://goaztecs.co.uk

The Bristol Aztecs are an American football team based in Bristol, England. Competing in both the BAFA National Leagues Premier South, and the Central European Football League (CEFL) they are the south-west's only Premiership team.

== History ==
Aztecs Logo prior to 2025 rebrand

The Bristol Aztecs were formed in 1990. They won the Division Two championship in 1999. The club established Youth and Junior programmes in 2003 strengthening its long-term player development pathway. The team operates from Shaftesbury Park in Filton and represents the City of Bristol, where it was founded.

Following the 2007 BAFL re-alignment, the Aztecs remained in the Premier Division and have competed at the top level of British American football since. Prior to the 2020 season, the club formally joined the SGS College academy system and adopted the Bristol Academy Pride branding, introducing new colours, uniforms, helmets, and logos.

On 7 September 2025, the Bristol Aztecs won their first Premiership National Championship, defeating the London Warriors 27–24 in BritBowl XXXVII. The victory marked the club’s first national title at the senior Premiership level.

In October 2025, the Bristol Aztecs transitioned to a limited liability company, becoming Bristol American Football Ltd., alongside a significant financial investment from a new ownership group with a goal to further commercialise the brand. Later that month, ahead of the 2026 season, the club announced its third major rebrand. This rebrand included a refined logo, a change of primary colour from navy blue to royal blue, the formal reintroduction of orange as a secondary colour, and the adoption of royal blue helmets, reflecting a renewed visual identity and strategic direction for the organisation.
