= Humber Warhawks =

American Football team based in the United Kingdom

- Founded: 2014
- League: BAFA National Leagues
- Division: NFC South 2
- Team history: Kingston Warhawks (2013–2014); Grimsby Scorpions (2013–2014); Humber Warhawks (2014–)
- Location: Kingston upon Hull, East Riding of Yorkshire
- Stadium: Costello Stadium, Sports Field
- Colours: Red Helmets; Grey and Red Jerseys; Red Pants
- Website: www.humberwarhawks.com

The Humber Warhawks are a British American football team based in Hull, East Riding of Yorkshire who play in the BAFA National Leagues NFC 2 East, the third level of American football in the country. The club represent the counties of East Yorkshire and North East Lincolnshire by taking their name from the Humber Estuary that flows between the two counties and the Humber Bridge which connects them. The club were formed in 2014 when the Kingston Warhawks merged with fellow associate team the Grimsby Scorpions, it was decided to use the term "Humber" due to the Humber Estuary and Humber Bridge that separate Hull and the county of East Yorkshire and Grimsby and the county of North East Lincolnshire. They were later granted official BAFA status and debuted in the 2015 season.

== History ==
=== Early history ===
American football was first played in the City of Hull in the late 1980s, with the first club being the Hull Kingston Liberators. Over the next few years, the team were known by several other names, such as the Kingston Liberators, before disbanding as the Humberside Liberators in the early 1990s. The next team to come out of the City were the Hull Pirates, who achieved a third-place position in the National League in their only season of existence. Next came the Hull Rockets, before the Kingston Barbarians entered the league in 2001, then folded after two games.

The Hull Hornets were formed in 2005 and were awarded BAFA League Status in 2005. The Hornets became the City's only American football club until it folded in 2011. The following year former Doncaster Mustangs coach Pete Scorah formed the Kingston Warhawks. The Warhawks operated for two seasons as an associate American football team before a deal was struck to merge with rival team the Grimsby Scorpions who are from neighbouring town Grimsby in North East Lincolnshire. Hull was chosen as the base city for the new club with the majority of players from both teams forming into one squad with the exception of some who opted to join the Lincolnshire Bombers.

=== Debut season ===
The Humber Warhawks' inaugural match was a friendly against BAFA side Lincolnshire Bombers in which the Warhawks were soundly beaten. Other games came against the University of Hull Sharks before playing in the associate bowl against Halton Spartans at the Select Security Stadium, in which both clubs were eventually invited to become BAFA clubs for the 2015 season.

Warhawks' first ever official season saw them placed in the NFC South 2 along with the Lincolnshire Bombers, Leicester Falcons, Peterborough Saxons, Leeds Bobcats and Sandwell Steelers. The club's first result was a 54–0 away defeat to the Saxons, followed up by a 73–0 home defeat the following week to the same team. Humber struggled in their opening season, with their best performance coming in a 52–16 home defeat against the Leeds Bobcats. Games against local rivals the Lincolnshire Bombers ended in 54–0 and 64–0 defeats. Humber ultimately finished the season with a 0–10 record.

=== First victories ===
The Warhawks appointed Lincolnshire Bombers Offensive Coordinator Alex Robson as Head Coach who in turn acquired a wave of experienced players from other sides. On the first day of the 2016 season they defeated the Bombers 34–32 in a fiercely fought contest. Robson went on to guide the Warhawks to a 3–7 record in which they also beat the Bombers by a score of 50–12. They eventually finished 4th in a strong division in which all 3 teams ahead of them advanced to the play-offs. They also notably ran relegated Division One side Staffordshire Surge close only losing 30–26 with the winning margin coming because of Humber failing to convert PAT's. Robson resigned from the Warhawks at the end of the season in order to start a family, handing back the Head Coach position to Pete Scorah. The Warhawks struggled to retain key personnel from the previous season and would evidently struggle with the team finishing bottom of the division with a 1–9 record following a solitary 14–13 victory over the Crewe Railroaders on the opening day of the season.

=== 2018 season ===
The Humber Warhawks went into the 2018 season with Jerome Cronin as Head Coach, Alex Moore as Offensive Co-ordinator and Joe Smith as Defensive Co-ordinator. Following a good recruitment the team went into the new season in the NFC 2 South with a number of rookies, the team also went into the new season with a new kit, donning grey and red instead of the previous green and white.

The team's first game saw a trip to Staffordshire Surge, with many players playing their first game it was a difficult game for the Warhawks eventually falling to a 52–0 defeat. They next travelled to face the Crewe Railroaders, the game was a lot closer but still ended in a 21–6 defeat. The 3rd game of the season saw the Railroaders travel across to Humber for the Warhawks first game of the season at Hull University, in a spirited performance the Warhawks held Crewe but couldn't find the victory, 12–0. After a 4-week mid season break the Warhawks welcomed Staffordshire to Hull University, again Surge got the better of The Warhawks with the game finishing 49–0.

After a difficult start to the season going 0–4, the Knottingley Raiders travelled to Humber, on a July afternoon the Warhawks determination and effort paid off with an 18–8 victory, rookie Brad Wright scoring a brace of receiving touchdowns both thrown by Josh Guthrie in only his second career start. The Warhawks moved to 1–4. The heat that afternoon was matched and then bettered 7 days later as the two teams rematched in Knottingley, an injury hit Warhawks team took the game to the Raiders eventually and coming away with a 6–6 draw taking their 2018 record to 1–4–1.

The final 2 games of the season looked to be big tests against strong and experienced teams starting at home to Birmingham Bulls, having almost secured a play off spot the Bulls were heavy favourites, but another spirited and determined performance saw the Warhawks hold the Bulls to one of their lowest points tallies of the season, but still going down 16–0. At 1–5–1 there was one game left to play and a trip to local rivals Lincoln, taking the lead through a Steffen Hagavei touchdown, Tom Barker scoring later in the game but ultimately a 40–16 defeat in the game for Humber.

The season ended with 1–6–1 record the Humber Warhawks. Points scored, teamwork and individual performances gave the team a good building block for the next season.

=== 2019 season ===
The 2019 season saw more changes to the Warhawks leadership, Alex Moore being appointed as Head Coach to replace Jerome Cronin. The Warhawks spent the off season recruiting more new players to their ranks to help to continue building the club, the club moved their training base from Sirius West Academy to Costello Stadium, the club continued to play home games at Hull University.

The first game of the season saw a home match with the Lincoln Bombers, first game nerves and the new season rustiness showed against a Bombers side that had already played their first game of the season the week before, the game ending 42–0 to Lincoln. After a disappointing start Humber faced the tricky trip to Staffordshire, the reigning NFC 2 South champions, Humber travelled well and took the game to Surge, trailing 9–0 at half time they came out firing and Victor Da Silva scored a touchdown and following a successful 2 point conversion the score was 9–8, both teams traded blows and the score was 24–16 going into the 2 minute warning, the Warhawks fail to convert on their final drive and a late Surge score meant the game ended 31–16. The game was a step in the right direction after a difficult first game. The third and fourth games saw back to back face offs with the Birmingham Bulls, a rampant Bulls side cruised through the 2 games much like they would the rest of their games in 2019 winning 42–0 and 32–0. Again sitting at 0–4 in a season the Warhawks travelled short handed to the Crewe Railroaders, with just 22 players making the trip it was going to be a difficult afternoon, but a defiant Humber outfit pushed Crewe all the way, eventually coming away 20–13 winners, Brad Wright, Jack Storey and Lewis Gaden scoring the touchdowns for the 'Crewe 22'.

After a 4-week gap in the fixtures came to an end with a home game against Staffordshire Surge, Surge travelled in good numbers but Humber played a tough game and dominated the game on all sides of the ball, two Brad Wright touchdowns leading to a 14–8 victory, the first ever time the Warhawks have beaten Staffordshire Surge. After a big victory Humber only had a week to wait, before travelling over the bridge to Lincoln, a strong Lincoln side were rocked when Humber Quarterback Josh Guthrie ran in a touchdown on their first possession and then the Bombers turning the ball over to the Warhawks on their first drive. The game was tight but the larger squad ultimately prevailed with Bombers winning 20–6.

The final game of the season saw Crewe travel to Humber, the Warhawks chasing their best ever season record. Crewe started the stronger taking a 7–0 lead at the quarter, The Warhawks rallied though and ended up comfortably picking up the win, a 42–16 win with scores from Brad Wright, Steffen Hagavei, Tom Barker, Owen Jones-Barker and two from Jack Storey.

The team finished the season with a 3–5 record for Humber, with a win percentage of 0.375, which was the best record in the team’s short history at that point. The Warhawks narrowly missed the play-offs on points difference.

== Current roster ==
The Humber Warhawks 2023 Players and Coaches.

2019 Roster
Number	Player	Position
0	Billy Archer	DE
1	Brad Wright	WR
3	Josh Guthrie	QB
4	Carlos Kachok	LB
5	Jack Horton	WR
7	Sam Kelsall	FS
8	Richard Adepoju	WR
10	Callum Ledingham	RB
11	Daniel Naylor	LB
12	Harry Hodgson	WR
13	Steffen Hagavei	WR
16	Rob Logan	CB
17	Luke Elders	CB
19	Luke Tomkinson	DE
21	Matthew Ashton	CB
22	Curtis Banks	WR
24	Daniel Holiday	WR
25	Elliot Hutchinson	RB
26	Rob Marsh	CB
27	Josh Deans	LB
28	Jordan Edmondson	WR
29	Adam Carpenter	LB
30	Jamie Sprangle	RB
31	Joshua Walker	WR
32	Scott Jacobs	LB
33	Will Knott	CB
40	Adam Foulds	RB
42	Cameron Meakes	LB
44	Rob Blakebrough	LB
47	Tom Hammet	DL
48	Rob Lashley	LB
50	Jordan Mcallister	LB
52	Matthew Richardson	DT
53	Chris Daly	OL
54	Tom 'TJ' Johnson	OL
55	Mike Hornby	OL
56	James Crosby	OL
65	Stephen Fewster	OL
66	Tommy Walker	DL
69	Chris Daly	OL
81	Edward Alsop	LB
85	Danny Birkett	WR
87	Tom Barker	TE
88	Jack Storey	WR
89	Owen Jones-Barker	WR
99	Calum Wright	DL

== Home ground ==
The Warhawks play and train at Costello Stadium, for the 2024 Season games were played at the Cottingham Tigers home ground.

== Team records ==
Season	League	Level	Regular Season Record			Post Season	Notes
Season	League	Level	Wins	Losses	Ties	Post Season	Notes
2015	BAFANL NFC South 2	3	0	10	0	–	–
2016	BAFANL NFC South 2	3	3	7	0	–	–
2017	BAFANL NFC South 2	3	1	9	0	–	–
2018	BAFANL NFC South 2	3	1	6	1	–	–
2019	BAFANL NFC South 2	3	3	5	0	–	–
2020	BAFANL NFC South 2	3	0	0	0	–	Season cancelled due to COVID-19 pandemic.
2021	BAFANL White Rose	–	5	2	0	–	Exhibition season due to COVID-19 pandemic.
2022	BAFANL NFC South 2	3	4	4	0	–	–
2023	BAFANL NFC East 2	3	8	0	0	1–1	NFC East 2 Division Champions
Total			25	43	1	All-time regular season record	
