= Aberdeen Roughnecks =

American Football team based in the United Kingdom

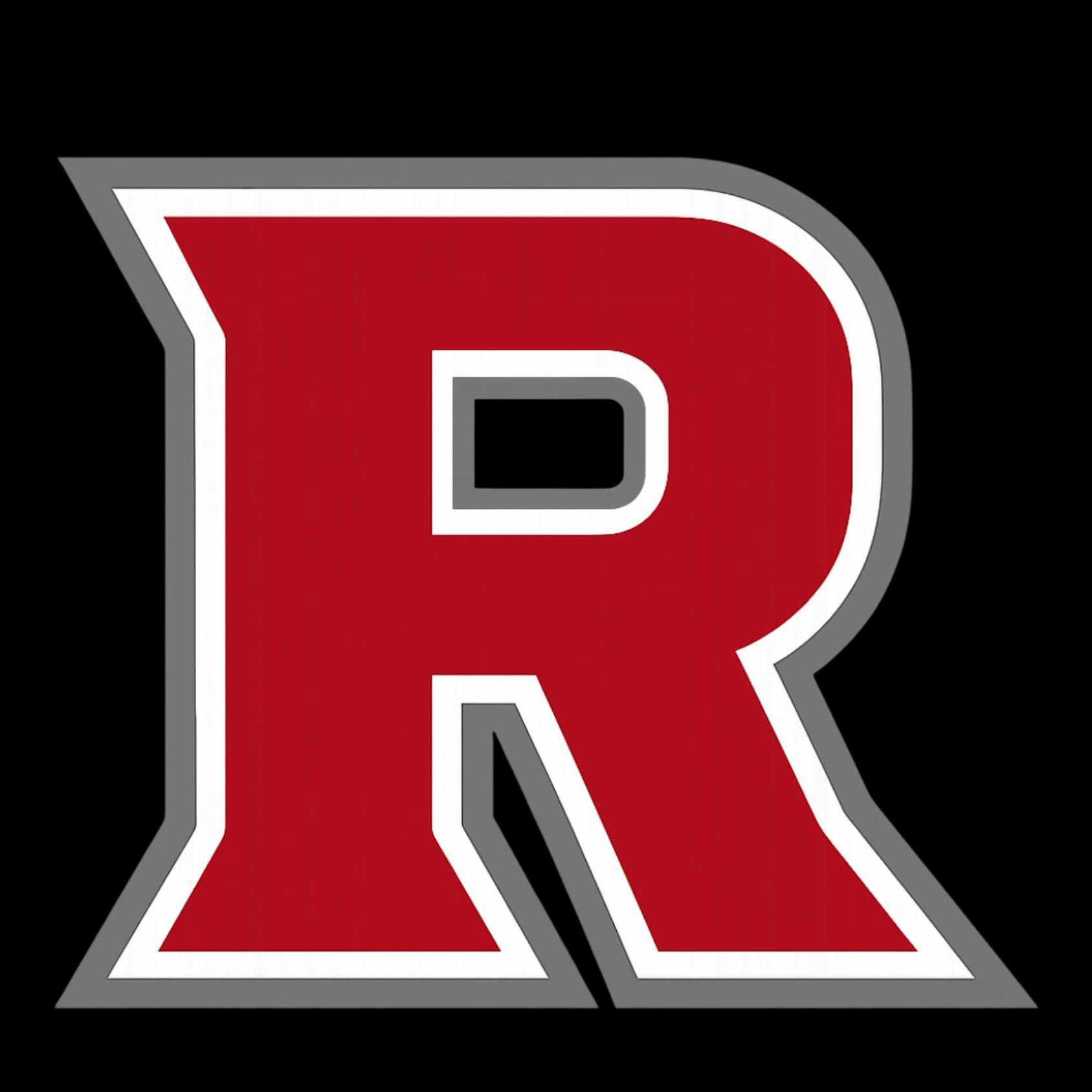
- Founded: 2012; 14 years ago
- League: BAFA National Leagues
- Division: NFC 1 Scotland
- Location: Aberdeen, Aberdeenshire, Scotland
- Stadium: Balgownie Playing Fields Home Farm Rd, Bridge of Don, Aberdeen AB22 8LX
- Colours: White Helmets, Red Jerseys, Grey Pants
- Division titles: 1: 2018
- Playoff berths: 4: 2015, 2016, 2017, 2018
- Website: https://www.abdnroughnecks.com/

Aberdeen Roughnecks

Current uniform
Home

Away

The Aberdeen Roughnecks are an American football club based in Aberdeen, Aberdeenshire, Scotland, who compete in the BAFA National Leagues NFC 1 Scotland. The team operates from the sports field within Hazlehead Park that they nickname "The Rig". They were formed in 2012 and after progressing out of Associate status they debuted in the 2014 season. The club have paid homage to the previous Aberdeen-based side the Granite City Oilers and have considered themselves a continuation of the Oilers.

The Roughnecks represent the most northern based team currently operating within the BAFANL, in 2018 they were crowned NFC 2 North champions and completed a perfect season when they defeated the Chester Romans in the Division Two Bowl game.

== History ==
Aberdeen had an American football team before the Roughnecks, with the Granite City Oilers running from February 1986. The original team saw some success, winning their conference in 1989 and again in 1993 before they disbanded in 1995. The club began with a few fans of the sport meeting in Seaton Park to throw a ball around. Joint training camps and scrimmages followed with the Highland Wildcats adult side, giving the players a taste of game action.

The Roughnecks now had a head coach in place, and enough players to apply for associate membership of the British American Football Association (BAFA), taking their first step to entering the UK's league structure.

To fulfill the conditions of full membership, the club played 3 matches towards the end of the year: the Glasgow Tigers and Clyde Valley Blackhawks visited The Rig, before the team travelled south to face the Dundee Hurricanes. Despite suffering losses in all 3 games, the Roughnecks proved that they were competitive enough and ready to enter the BAFA National Leagues, and were voted in as full members of BAFA at the body's AGM in November 2013.

Embarking on their first BAFA National Leagues (BAFANL) campaign, the Roughnecks experienced a difficult rookie season, losing their first 8 games before finishing with a maiden victory over the Glasgow Tigers and a tie with the Dundee Hurricanes.
