= Border reivers (disambiguation) =

Border reivers were raiders along the Anglo-Scottish border between the 13th and 16th centuries.

Border reivers may also refer to:

- Border Reivers (rugby union), a former rugby team in Scotland
- "Border Reiver", a song by Mark Knopfler from the 2009 album Get Lucky
- Carlisle Border Reivers, a former American football club in England
- Border Reivers (racing team), a former motor racing team from Scotland

== See also ==
- Reaver (disambiguation)
- The Reivers (disambiguation)
- Border ruffian, a proslavery raider from Missouri, before the American Civil War
