= Carlisle Border Reivers =

Former American football team based in the United Kingdom (2009–2013)

- Founded: 2009
- Conference: BAFACL Division 2 North
- Based in: Carlisle
- Stadium: Sheepmount Stadium
- Colours: White or Maroon & Silver with Black helmets

The Carlisle Border Reivers were an American football team playing in Division 2 North of the BAFA Community Leagues. They were based in Carlisle, Cumbria, England. The team folded in 2013.

The Border Reivers were one of Cumbria’s American football Team's, alongside the Walney Terriers, and have gained full status to the British American Football Associations League (BAFA Community Leagues) for the 2011 Season. The Reivers' first training session was in January 2010 and the team was associate members in the league in the 2010 season playing 4 friendly games against Gateshead, Dundee, Clyde Valley and Loughborough.

== History ==
The Reivers completed their first full season in the BAFA National Leagues in 2011, they ended the season with a 0-10 record and finished 7th and bottom of division 2 North. The Reivers will compete in Division 2 North again for the 2012 season alongside Clyde Valley Blackhawks, Dundee Hurricanes, Glasgow Tigers and Highland Wildcats.

In December 2010, The Reivers were associated as full members to the BAFA Community Leagues and for the first full season the Reivers were aligned to Division 2 Northern Conference for the 2011 season along with Clyde Valley Blackhawks, Dundee Hurricanes, Glasgow Tigers, Highland Wildcats and West Coast Trojans.

The Border Reivers were formed in the winter of 2009. The Reivers have roots mainly from the Cumbria Mariners of 2007-2009, a small team from Whitehaven, West Cumbria. In 2010, the Reivers played 4 games as BAFACL Associate Members, on their way to achieving full league status, the Reivers lost all 4 games against experienced teams. The Reivers 2010 games were against Division 1 teams, Dundee Hurricanes & Gateshead Senators and Division 2 team the Clyde Valley Blackhawks, the final game of the 2010 season was against Loughborough Aces who are one of BUAFL’s most successful teams

The Cumbria Mariners were Associate Members to BAFA in 2008 and were unable to achieve full league status in 2009 despite playing 3 full games in the Summer of 2008. The Cumbria Mariners were based in Whitehaven, West Cumbria. The team moved to Carlisle to achieve larger playing numbers which would enable the club to grow - the team rebranded as the Carlisle Border Reivers.

The Reivers can also trace their roots to Cumbria's original teams from the 1980s and early 1990s, the Carlisle Kestrels, the Furness Phantoms, and the Cumbria Cougars, who played in the original British American Football League.

== Home ground ==
The Reivers both practice and play home games at the Sheepmount stadium, Carlisle. Admission to the Reivers games is free.
