= West Coast Trojans =

Former American football team based in the United Kingdom (2004–2018)

Logo

General information
- Founded: 2004; 22 years ago
- Stadium: Meadow Park, Irvine, Scotland
- Headquartered: Paisley, Scotland

Personnel
- General manager: Gary McNey

League / conference affiliations
- BAFA National Leagues; NFC2 North

Current uniform
Home

Away

The West Coast Trojans were an amateur American football team based at Pro-Life Gym in Paisley, Scotland. In their final season, the Trojans competed in the BAFANL Division 2 North.

The Trojans played their home games at Meadow Park, Irvine with previous home venues including Portland Park, Troon and Scotstoun Stadium, Glasgow.

== Team history ==
=== 2005 season ===
The Trojans' home games were played at St Stephens High School in Port Glasgow, Inverclyde. The team competed in the BAFL Division 2 Scottish Conference which they won convincingly, but were defeated in the semi-final of the playoffs by the Div 2 Champions, the Coventry Cassidy Jets. Game MVP - Jonny Polea who played Offence/Defence and all special teams.

Date	Home team	Score	Score	Away team
10-Apr-2005	Dundee Hurricanes	6	12	Trojans
08-May-2005	Glasgow Tigers	6	36	Trojans
15-May-2005	Trojans	46	13	Dundee Hurricanes
22-May-2005	Trojans	46	21	Edinburgh Wolves
29-May-2005	Trojans	42	16	Glasgow Tigers
05-Jun-2005	Manchester Titans	8	56	Trojans
26-Jun-2005	Trojans	36	12	Edinburgh Wolves
24-Jul-2005	Edinburgh Wolves	13	20	Trojans
31-Jul-2005	Trojans	12	0	Dundee Hurricanes
21-Aug-2005	Glasgow Tigers	14	6	Trojans
04-Sep-2005	Trojans	56	0	Manchester Titans (Division 2 Quarter-Final)
11-Sep-2005	Coventry Jets	55	6	Trojans (Division 2 Semi-Final)

=== 2006 season ===
The Trojans competed in the BAFL Division 2 Scottish Conference which they won convincingly by beating Redditch Arrows in the Northern Conference Championship game, but ended up losing the Britbowl Division 2 Bowl 29–28 to the Oxford Saints.

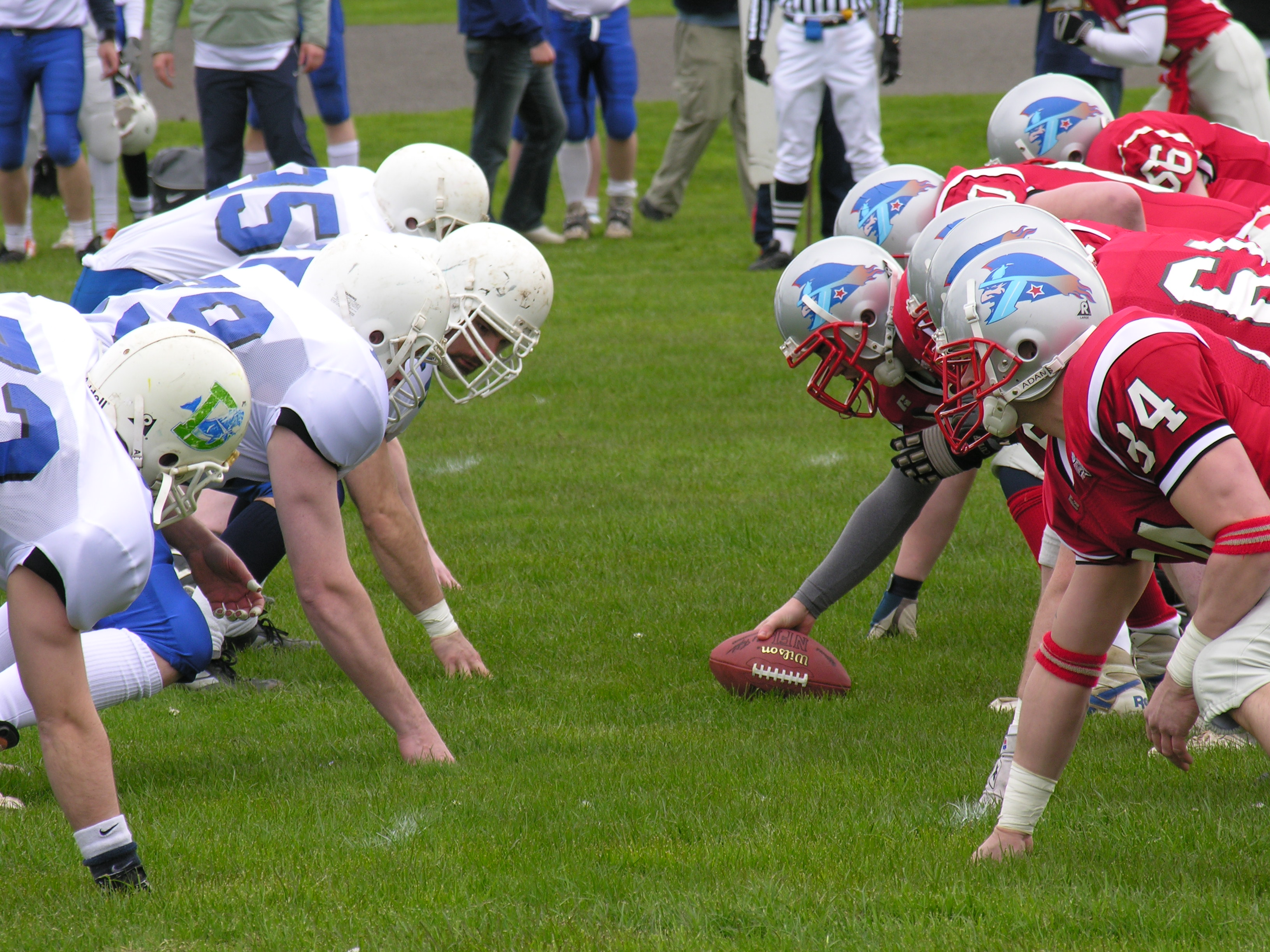
The Trojans offence lines up against the defence of the Dundee Hurricanes

Home team	Score	Score	Away team
Trojans	56	6	Nighthawks
Trojans	12	6	Hurricanes
Tigers	20	34	Trojans
Hurricanes	13	20	Trojans
Trojans	62	6	Tigers
Tigers	0	84	Trojans
Trojans	1	0	Hurricanes(Forfeit)
Trojans	72	12	Romans (Div 2 1/4 Final)
Redditch	32	38	Trojans (Div 2 Semi Final, Northern Championship Game)
Trojans	28	29	Saints (Britbowl XX)

Trojans Management Team
Trojans Committee	Gary McNey, Ross Cavanagh, Iain McVeigh, Murray Hogg, David Strachan, Stuart Miller

Trojans Coaching Staff
Head coach — Off Coordinator: Gary McNey
Quarterback — Wide Receiver — Tight End

Coach: Gary McNey

Offensive Line Coach: Neil Irvine
Running Backs Coach: Jordan Falconer
Defensive Coordinator: Bob Lynch
Linebackers Coach: Bob Lynch
Defensive Backs Coach: Brian McFerren

Trojans Gameday Staff
Team Sports Therapist: Kai McClintock
Game Stats: Kenny Milroy
Sideline Assistant: George McClintock

Trojans Official Photographer
Official Team Photographer: Iain MacIntosh

=== 2007 season ===
The Trojans competed in the BAFL Division 1 Northern Conference, winning nine games and losing only one to the Redditch Arrows at home and winning their second consecutive title. The team lost their semi-final to the Ipswich Cardinals going down 28–13 at home.

Home team	Score	Score	Away team
Trojans	36	0	Mustangs
Trojans	56	16	Romans
Mustangs	6	8	Trojans
Trojans	8	16	Arrows
Trojans	52	6	Surge
Romans	0	59	Trojans
Arrows	26	28	Trojans
Rams	7	43	Trojans
Surge	0	1	Trojans
Trojans	1	0	Rams
Trojans	13	28	Cardinals

=== 2008 season ===
The team posted a 4–4–2 record but missed the playoffs for the first time in their history after an end of season defeat at the hands of the Redditch Arrows. One of the tied games was awarded by the BAFL after an away visit to the Dundee Hurricanes, but was never rescheduled after initially being postponed in the late part of the season.

=== 2009 season ===
The offseason was promising, with the Trojans bringing in a large number of rookies through their coaching connections with nearby University side, the Paisley Pyros. Filling the gaps in the roster which plagued them in 2008, West Coast were expected to be back to their best as they opened their campaign against the team whose split in 2004 caused their formation, the East Kilbride Pirates. Two early scores gave the Trojans a 12–0 lead, however reality bit hard as the Pirates scored 62 points without reply, handing the Trojans the worst defeat in their history.

Game two saw the Trojans visit Leeds to take on the Yorkshire Rams. Injuries from the season opener had taken their toll on the Trojans and the home team recorded a comfortable 21-point victory.

The third game of their campaign saw the Trojans hosting a team who were yet to beat them in seven meetings, the Dundee Hurricanes. In yet another blow to the home side, the Hurricanes strong running game overpowered the Trojans, leading to Dundee recording their first ever victory over West Coast.

In game four, the Trojans finally broke their duck, recording an away victory over former Division Two club, the Merseyside Nighthawks. However, this success didn't last and the Trojans lost again in game five. The return of long-time running back Jon Sutherland for game six meant that they were able to record their second victory of the year. Their return fixture against the Dundee Hurricanes had to be postponed due to a lack of referees and, due to a lack of available players for the fixture, the Trojans were caused to forfeit the return fixture against the East Kilbride Pirates. In their next played game, the Trojans fell to a crushing home loss from the Merseyside Nighthawks, dropping them to second bottom in Division One North.

Their penultimate game of the season saw the Trojans crushed by the Doncaster Mustangs, leaving only the rescheduled game against the Dundee Hurricanes to save them from finishing bottom of Division One North.

Date	Home team	Score	Score	Away team
03/05/2009	Trojans	12	62	Pirates
17/05/2009	Rams	27	6	Trojans
31/05/2009	Trojans	12	27	Hurricanes
07/06/2009	Nighthawks	8	20	Trojans
14/06/2009	Mustangs	41	20	Trojans
28/06/2009	Trojans	36	8	Senators
12/07/2009	Hurricanes	P	P	Trojans
02/08/2009	Pirates	1	0	Trojans
09/08/2009	Trojans	0	57	Nighthawks
16/08/2009	Trojans	6	58	Mustangs

=== 2010 season ===
The Trojans' home games were played at Scotstoun Stadium in Glasgow. The 2010 season was classed as a rebuilding year and nothing much was expected of the Trojans, but they finished strong and secured 2nd spot behind the Wolves. The Trojans went on to lose to the eventual finalists, the Titans.

=== 2011 season ===
The Trojans' home games were played at Portland Park in Troon. On the back of the return of running back Jordan Falconer, the Trojans returned to form emphatically in 2011, tearing through their conference with a 10–0 record, making it all the way to the British finals in Crystal Palace, London. Despite being heavy favourites, the Trojans suffered a crushing defeat at the hands of the South Wales Warriors.

=== 2012 season ===
The Trojans' home games were again played at Portland Park in Troon, where the club hoped to set-up a permanent base including a training & development academy for American football.

Having made it to the 2011 Division 2 final, the Trojans were promoted to Division One as part of a restructure of the top segment of the game. They started poorly, losing their opener to the Coventry Jets in awful weather conditions, but then went on a 10-game winning streak, taking the top seed in the North and beating the Berkshire Renegades convincingly in the National semi final. This gave them their third shot at a British final as they took on the Sussex Thunder at Don Valley Stadium, Sheffield. The Trojans had the better record, a significantly more potent offense and a defense which was almost twice as stingy as the Thunder's, giving them the tag of favourites for the game. But this was again just down to the Trojans playing ball in the North, but everyone connected to the game knew the former Premier Thunder would be a hard nut to crack, more so with the return of many players. Under horrendous conditions the Trojans out ran, out passed but failed to outscore the Thunder who took the Bowl with a 10–7 win.

=== 2013 season ===
The Trojans were promoted to the Premier Division, in a restructure which saw the sport move to a two-tier format after the 2012 season. It was to prove the hardest season for the team since it first entered the league in 2005, the team lost a lot of players during pre-season, but they continued to battle on in games many would have forfeited, they played with 17 v Caesars, 22 v Rams and on their last game, faced the #3 team in the UK with 23 players.

Fixtures and Results:

27/04 vs Birmingham Bulls - L 0 - 3

05/05 @ Sheffield Predators - L 46 - 24

12/05 vs East Kilbride Pirates - L 0 - 34

09/06 @ Tamworth Phoenix CANCELLED

16/06 @ Doncaster Mustangs CANCELLED

14/07 vs Lancashire Wolverines - L 32 - 54

21/07 @ Nottingham Caesars - L 42 - 14

04/08 vs Yorkshire Rams - L - 36 - 6

10/08 vs Coventry Jets CANCELLED

17/08 @ East Kilbride Pirates - L - 63 - 0

=== 2014 season ===
With the leagues being restructured the Trojans were put in an all Scotland league, with Aberdeen Roughnecks, Clyde Valley Black hawks, Dundee Hurricanes, Edinburgh Wolves, and Glasgow Tigers. The team were optimistic about their chances, with a high number of rookies joining and especially with the return of influential players such as Jordan Falconer RB and Fabio Maturano DB. In the end the team finished 7-0-3, with the losses coming twice from Clyde Valley and once from Edinburgh Wolves, nonetheless, it was a vast improvement from the season before.
