= BAFA National Leagues =

British American football league

- Formerly: British American Football League (1985–2010)
- Sport: American football
- Founded: (1983) reformed in 2010
- First season: reformed 2010
- Commissioner: Joe Walker
- No. of teams: 60
- Country: England (52 teams); Scotland (7 teams); Wales (1 team)
- Headquarters: Kidderminster, Worcestershire, England
- Most recent champions: Britbowl: Bristol Aztecs; Premier North: Manchester Titans; Premier South: Bristol Aztecs; NFC 1 Scotland: Glasgow Tigers; NFC 1 North: Yorkshire Rams; NFC 1 Midlands: Sandwell Steelers; SFC 1 East: East Kent Mavericks; SFC 1 West: Solent Thrashers; NFC 2 North: Humber Warhawks; NFC 2 Midlands: Leicester Panthers; SFC 2 East: Oxford Saints; SFC 2 West: Hereford Stampede
- Most titles: London Warriors (7 titles)
- Related competitions: Britbowl

The BAFA National Leagues (BAFANL) is the primary American football domestic league competition in Great Britain. Originally formed in 1983, the league is run by the British American Football Association to coordinate contact football within England, Scotland and Wales. The top level is the Premier Division and the BritBowl is the annual final championship game. The league was reformed in 2010 following the collapse of the British American Football League, which had run in a number of different guises since the early 1980s. Previous names of the league were the UKAFL (UK American Football League), the Budweiser League and the BNGL (British National Gridiron League). From 1998 until 2005 the league was known as the BSL (British Senior League). Tensions grew throughout 2009 between the directors of BAFL and those of the governing body the British American Football Association, and at the beginning of 2010 the BAFL formally, but unconstitutionally, withdrew from BAFA. This led to uproar from the teams within BAFL, ultimately signalling the end for BAFL as an entity. The league ceased operations on 1 April 2010 and was replaced by the BAFA Community Leagues for the 2010 season, rebranding in 2011 to become the BAFANL. Notable players to have come from the BAFANL who have gone on to play in the NFL are Efe Obada, Aden Durde, Jermaine Allen and Marvin Allen.

The league operates a summer season and begins in April and plays through until August, with play-off games running into September. There are currently 60 teams who compete in 12 regional divisions across three levels of football. The 12 teams who contest both the two BAFA Premier Divisions compete to reach the annual Britbowl final, whereas teams in the second and third level aim to earn promotion to the Division above, attempting to reach one of the Divisional bowl finals. The current champions are the Bristol Aztecs who won the 2026 Britbowl as well as the Premier Division South, after defeating the Manchester Titans 49–10 in the 2026 Britbowl final.

== History ==
=== Origins ===
American football was introduced to the United Kingdom during the early part of the 20th century by American servicemen stationed in the country. The first recorded match took place on 23 November 1910 at Crystal Palace, London, where a team made up of the crew from USS Idaho defeated their counterparts from USS Vermont 19–0. During the Second World War, matches were played by American and Canadian servicemen stationed in the UK at venues throughout the country. This included the 'Tea Bowl' game played at the White City Stadium in 1944, and this was followed by the creation of the United States Armed Forces Europe (USAFE) league in 1946. This league consisted of teams from American military bases throughout Europe, with one of the league's three conferences made up of teams based in the UK – teams from this conference won the league championship thirteen times until the competition ceased in 1993.

=== Early history ===
The first teams open to British players were established in 1983, and competition began the following year in the form of a series of one-off games. The match results were compiled into a 'Merit Table', with teams playing more than three games eligible for the championship—the first champions were the London Ravens, who won all ten of their matches. Previous names of the league were the UKAFL (UK American Football League), the Budweiser League and the BNGL (British National Gridiron League). From 1998 until 2005 the league was known as the BSL (British Senior League).

=== Split from the BAFL ===
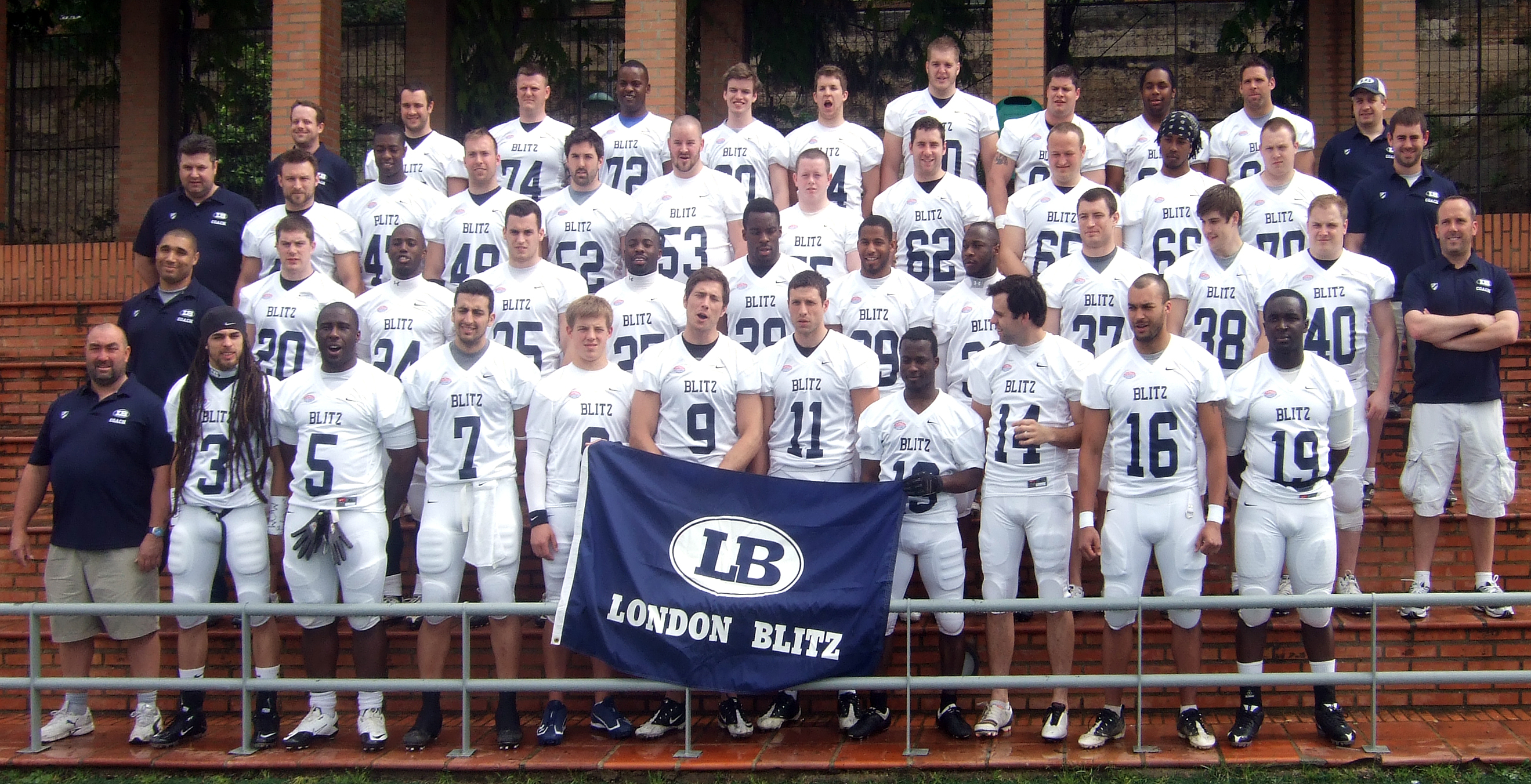
The London Blitz prior to their 2011 EFAF Cup match in Spain

Tensions grew throughout 2009 between the directors of the British American Football League and those of the governing body the British American Football Association, and at the beginning of 2010 the BAFL formally, but unconstitutionally, withdrew from BAFA. This led to uproar from the teams within BAFL, ultimately signalling the end for BAFL as an entity. The league ceased operations on 1 April 2010. The league was replaced by the BAFA Community Leagues for the 2010 season. This organisation, run under the umbrella of the governing body, rebranded in 2011 to become the BAFA National Leagues. Hundreds of clubs have since been formed, playing both full contact football and flag football at senior, university and youth level. Many of these clubs have since folded, renamed or merged with other local teams, but a few of the older clubs survive today.

=== Recent developments ===
In 2023, the British American Football Association (BAFA) announced it would bring the Flag Football National Leagues under its direct governance beginning with the 2025 season. The move aimed to unify oversight of both contact and non-contact disciplines, streamline regulations, and provide more development opportunities for youth and female athletes.

=== NFL Partnership ===
That same year, BAFA entered into a strategic partnership with the NFL to grow grassroots participation in the UK. The agreement included investment in infrastructure, access to coaching resources, and branding support, particularly in schools and underserved regions. It also aligned with the International Federation of American Football's (IFAF) Olympic development goals, especially in advance of flag football's inclusion in the 2028 Summer Olympics in Los Angeles.

== Season format ==
=== Regions ===
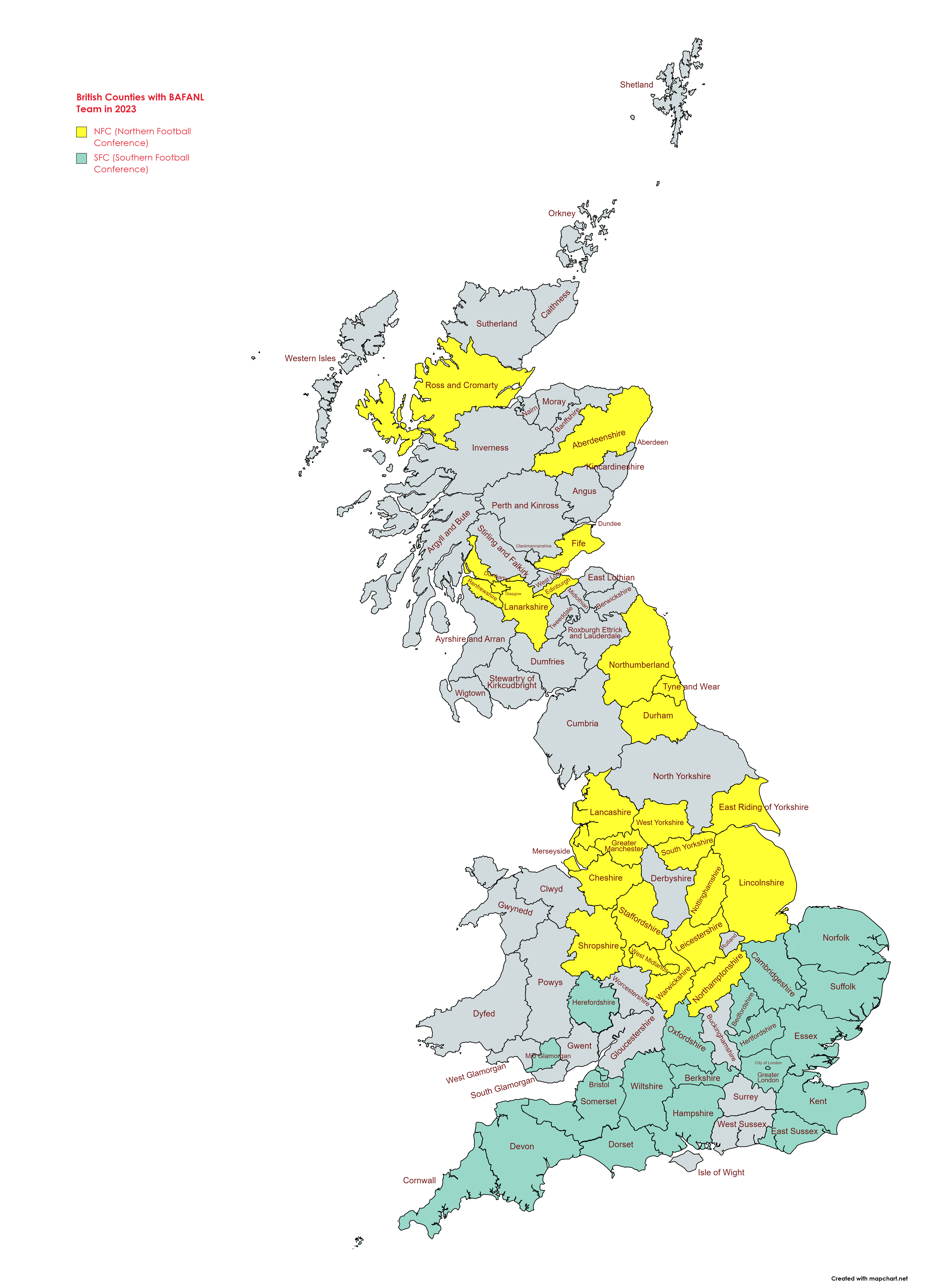
British counties with BAFANL teams in 2023 NFC (Northern Football Conference) SFC (Southern Football Conference)

The BAFANL is contested by teams from England, Scotland, and Wales. Teams from Northern Ireland compete under competition from American Football Ireland and therefore do not compete with teams from the rest of the United Kingdom. The regular season format consists of two Conferences, the Northern Football Conference (NFC) and Southern Football Conference (SFC), within each Conference there are three levels of competition starting at Premier Division and filtering down to Divisions One and Two. Teams can be switched between the NFC and SFC depending on the geographic location of each team at the beginning of the season. In the past when Division One has been loaded with teams from the middle of England there has been a designated Midlands Football Conference (MFC), although this is currently defunct.

=== Game Day ===
The current format consists of a ten-game season for Premier Division teams and Division One teams, with Division Two now playing eight games. The league is a summer sport in the UK and runs opposite to the NFL, with teams beginning pre-season training in January to compete in the regular season that takes place between April and August. The play-off games usually running into September, with the finals taking place towards the middle of the month. Following the climax of the regular season, the eventual winners and runners-up from both Premier Divisions make up the semi-final round in which they will compete to win a place in the Britbowl. Since 2014, the Britbowl winners will automatically qualify to play in the IFAF Europe Champions League for the following season. European games run aside the clubs domestic season, prior to 2014 qualification was for the EFAF Cup.

In 2024, BAFA confirmed that the BritBowl champions would become eligible once again to participate in the IFAF Europe Champions League, reintroducing international competition for British clubs for the first time since the mid-2010s.

For the 2025 season, BAFA introduced a formal promotion and relegation play-off structure between Division One and Division Two. This replaced the previous application-based promotion process with on-field competition, giving second-place Division Two teams the opportunity to earn promotion through head-to-head fixtures against lower-ranked Division One teams. Financial and logistical support was also introduced for clubs hosting these matches.

Unlike American football competitions in North America such as the NFL, NCAA and CFL, American football in the UK runs a similar promotion and relegation format to that of association football (soccer) in the United Kingdom. Teams from the Division One and Division Two aim to win promotion to the Division above by attempting to reach their respective play-off final. The team that finishes bottom of their division (excluding Division Two) are relegated to their relevant regional division in the level below. Although there is no active on-the-field promotion process to Division Two, there are a number of non-league sides who operate in the "associate process". Instead of playing to win promotion to the league these teams must gain entry by application to the British American Football Association and must meet a number of different criteria from playing a number of assessed exhibition games, sustainability, facilities and good coaching practice. BAFA have the ability to relegate any BAFANL team back to associate status if that club are failing to make the standard expected of them. If a team withdraws from the season but indicate their wish to continue operating then they will spend the following season at associate level. The game itself is run following the latest NCAA rules, this has been in practice since the 2005 season.

== Players and staff ==
=== Rosters ===
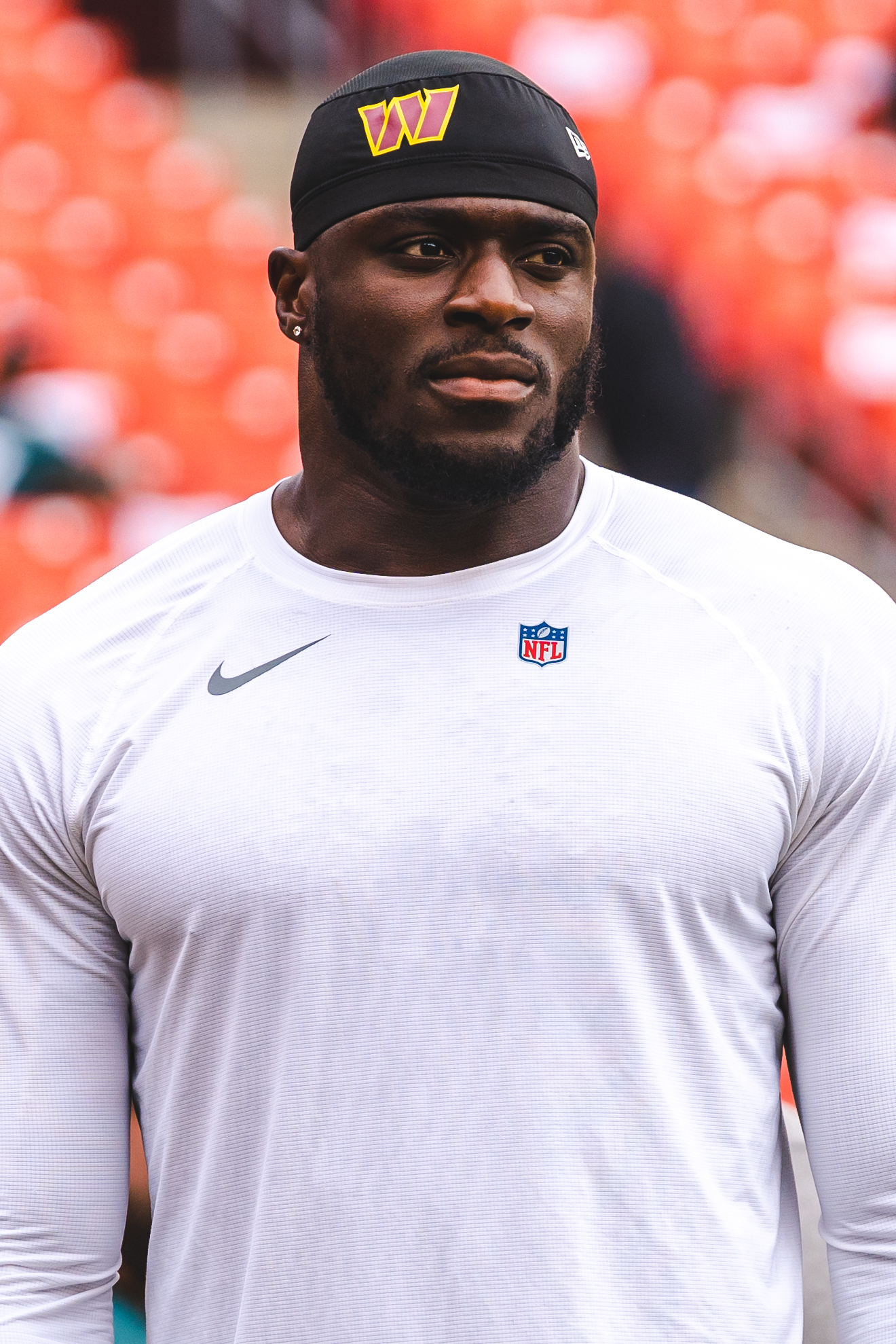
Efe Obada started his career in the BAFANL.

There is currently no limit on roster size, unlike the NFL's 53 man setup. Unlike the majority of top European leagues, British American football is currently amateur as opposed to pro or semi-professional. Clubs largely operate and turnover financially through sponsorship and player subscriptions. Whereas it is not currently illegal for a team to pay a wage to coaches, they are forbidden from paying a wage to players. Players currently have to pay a yearly fee to BAFA as well as contributing to the club they play for, regardless of stature or whether the player has been a professional elsewhere. The transfer window for players being allowed to move teams usually opens in October and closes midway through the season in July. Transfers are all handled through an online portal registration system in which the player requests the move and has to wait for both teams to accept the deal before finalisation is sent to BAFA.

Players in the BAFANL are largely made up of British nationals who due to the league's current status have to pay a subscription fee to both the league and their respective clubs. British league teams in earlier years were allowed to pay players and most teams had paid US import professionals. Clubs are currently not permitted to pay a wage to any player, but coaches and other staff members are able to receive a wage. There are currently no limits on roster size unlike the NFL's 53 man roster. The minimum age of BAFANL contact player is 18 years old, however players are allowed to play to youth football until the age of 19. Female players are currently permitted to participate in the league as well as the BAFA ran Women's National Football League. Premier League and some Division One sides tend to operate a try-out basis to recruit potential players over several training sessions, where as other sides tend to operate an inclusive grassroots approach with any player wishing to compete taken on board as long as they are fit enough to do so. A lot of football recruitment tends to come from other sports largely former rugby union players.

In 2019 BAFA announced all non-British players who play within the league have to have a permanent residence address in the UK and had to have been residing in the country for six months and suspended all players who did not meet these criteria, this was largely brought in due to Leicester Falcons partnership with US College side Baker Wildcats who in turned signed a significant number of U.S. athletes to their side following promotion to the BAFA Premier North. [[Tamworth Phoenix]] flagged an incident with BAFA in which a Baker player had attempted to broker a deal to play with them, with the player reported Leicester had offered to pay a wage of £1,000 per month and a free master's degree. Leicester were forced to cut ties with the Baker athletes prior to the first game of the 2019 season; they were eventually relegated back to Division 1 with a 2–8 record.

=== Notable players ===
Famous players to have played in the BAFANL include Efe Obada, who played for the London Warriors in 2014 and later played in the NFL. Aden Durde and Jermaine Allen of the London Olympians played in both the NFL Europe and the NFL, with Durde later staying in the NFL as a positional coach. Marvin Allen of the London Warriors also later moved to play in the NFL. Players to have come from the NFL to the BAFANL include Denver Broncos quarterback Bradlee Van Pelt and San Diego Chargers linebacker Jason Brisbane.

England's Rugby Union World Cup winning captain Martin Johnson and GB Olympics sprinter Dwain Chambers also played the sport briefly, as well as television presenters Dermot O'Leary and Vernon Kay and actors Ricky Whittle and Chris Fountain.

The following is a list of notable players and coaches who have featured either in the BAFA National Leagues or any of its predecessor leagues that have at any time represented the domestic game of American football in the United Kingdom.

Player	Team	Notes
(United Kingdom) Phil Alexander	Farnham Knights	Kicker for the London Monarchs, former professional association football player for Norwich City and chief executive of Crystal Palace
(United Kingdom) Jermaine Allen	London Olympians, London Warriors	Played in the NFL for Chicago Bears and New Orleans Saints
(United Kingdom) Marvin Allen	London Olympians (2001–2004), London Warriors (2008–2011)	Played in the NFL for Pittsburgh Steelers and Miami Dolphins
(Canada) Marcel Bellefeuille	Crawley Raiders	OC at CFL sides including Montreal Alouettes, Hamilton Tiger-Cats and the Winnipeg Blue Bombers
(United Kingdom) Roderick Bradley	London Blitz	Played "Spartan" on ITV game show Gladiators
(United Kingdom) Jason Brisbane	London Blitz	Played in the NFL for San Diego Chargers
(United Kingdom) Dwain Chambers	Farnham Knights	British Olympic Athletics track sprinter and former NFL Europe player with Hamburg Sea Devils
(United Kingdom) Charles Dagnall	Leicester Falcons	Former professional cricketer and BBC Radio presenter
(United Kingdom) Aden Durde	London Warriors	Defensive coordinator in the NFL with Seattle Seahawks and played for Kansas City Chiefs
(United Kingdom) Victor Ebubedike	London Ravens, London Olympians	NFL Europe player with the London Monarchs
(United Kingdom) Chris Fountain	Manchester Titans	Actor who had regular roles in Hollyoaks and Coronation Street
(United States) Mike Grossner	Nottingham Caesars, Leicester Falcons	Former NCAA coach with Western Colorado Mountaineers
(United States) Sean Payton	Leicester Panthers (1988)	Super Bowl winning head coach.
(United States) Christian Holmes	Tamworth Phoenix (2016)	Played in NCAA Division I for Mississippi State from 2011 to 2014
(United Kingdom) Stephen Hutchinson	London Blitz	Played in NFL Europe for London Monarchs and Hamburg Blue Devils
(United Kingdom) David Izinyon	London Warriors	Plays in the CFL for the Hamilton Tiger Cats
(United Kingdom) Martin Johnson	Leicester Panthers	Professional rugby union player and Rugby World Cup winning captain of the England team
(United Kingdom) Vernon Kay	London Warriors (2011–2014)	Television presenter, formerly of Channel 4's NFL show
(United Kingdom) Lorn Mayers	London Blitz (2004–2005)	Worked out for the Oakland Raiders before playing in NFL Europe for Berlin Thunder
(Nigeria) Efe Obada	London Warriors (2014)	Plays in the NFL with the Washington Commanders, previously with Dallas Cowboys, Kansas City Chiefs, Atlanta Falcons, Carolina Panthers and Buffalo Bills
(United Kingdom) Bamidele Olaseni	London Blitz	Plays in the NFL for the Las Vegas Raiders
(United Kingdom) Ayo Oyelola	London Olympians	Plays in the NFL with the Pittsburgh Steelers, previously with the Jacksonville Jaguars and the Winnipeg Blue Bombers in the CFL
(Sierra Leone) Tigie Sankoh	London Warriors, Kent Exiles	Played in the NFL for the Cleveland Browns, now with the Toronto Argonauts in the CFL
(United States) Phoebe Schecter	Staffordshire Surge, GB Lions Women	Intern coach in the NFL with the Buffalo Bills
(United States) Bradlee Van Pelt	Leicester Falcons (2010)	Quarterback in the NFL for Denver Broncos and Houston Texans, graduate of Colorado State
(United Kingdom) Ricky Whittle	Manchester Titans	Actor who notably had lengthy roles in Hollyoaks and Dream Team
(United Kingdom) (Zambia) Mapalo Mwansa	Nottingham Caesars	Plays in the NFL with the Carolina Panthers

== Media coverage ==
The Britbowl as well as the divisional play-off finals have been on YouTube via DblCoverage.com and Onside Productions. The programmes feature in-game commentary and interviews. Onside began operating by streaming Nottingham Caesars games coined as "Caesars TV" in 2016 before being brought on by DblCoverage.com to broadcast the national finals as well as Great Britain national American football team games.

Double Coverage (DblCoverage.com) was the largest British American football-focused media outlet and community hub, it featured news, league results and standings for all formats of the contact game, as well as opinion articles and editorials, their social media pages represented the largest online community of British American Football players and fans. However the site was taken down at the end of the 2019 season and the social media platform is now dormant. Sportank (previously Gridiron Hub) is now the UK's main American football outlet and covers all of the topics that were previously featured on Double Coverage. Sportank also offers weekly livestreams of British American Football games, making them the first media outlet to do such.

As of mid-2025, DepthChartSports was created and have livestreamed multiple Britball games, with the forming a livestreaming partnership with the Coventry Phoenix in the Northern Premiership with DepthChartSports planning to livestream all of the Coventry Phoenix's home games in the 2026 season.

In 2019, Onside provided the livestream of the U19 Junior National Championship and BritBowl XXXIII for BBC Sport.

Other popular media platforms include the podcast Exs and O's and Britballin, the latter have also begun streaming games.

== Stadiums ==
The use of stadiums in the BAFANL is sporadic due to most clubs running on a budget that relies heavily on sponsorship and subscriptions. Most BAFANL clubs operate from rugby union clubs, university or secondary school sports fields or local athletics parks, however some teams do play inside larger sports stadiums which have seating capacities for spectators. The Britbowl itself has recently been played at Allianz Park in London and the Sixways Stadium in Worcester, while Division 1 and 2 finals are often hosted at the South Leeds Stadium. At present the Halton Spartans ground share of the Select Security Stadium with rugby league team Widnes Vikings constitutes as the highest capacity stadium within the BAFANL with 13,350 seats. Other prominent stadiums that are currently in use in Britball include Manchester Titans home field at the National Speedway Stadium. Notable stadiums that have been used in the past includes Doncaster Mustangs use of the Keepmoat Stadium, London Olympians former home at the Crystal Palace Athletics Stadium, the AJ Bell Stadium by the Manchester Titans and De Montfort Park by Leicester Falcons.

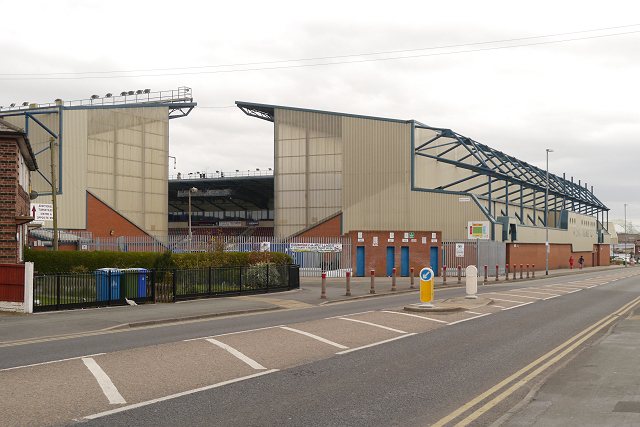
DCBL Stadium, Widnes, Cheshire

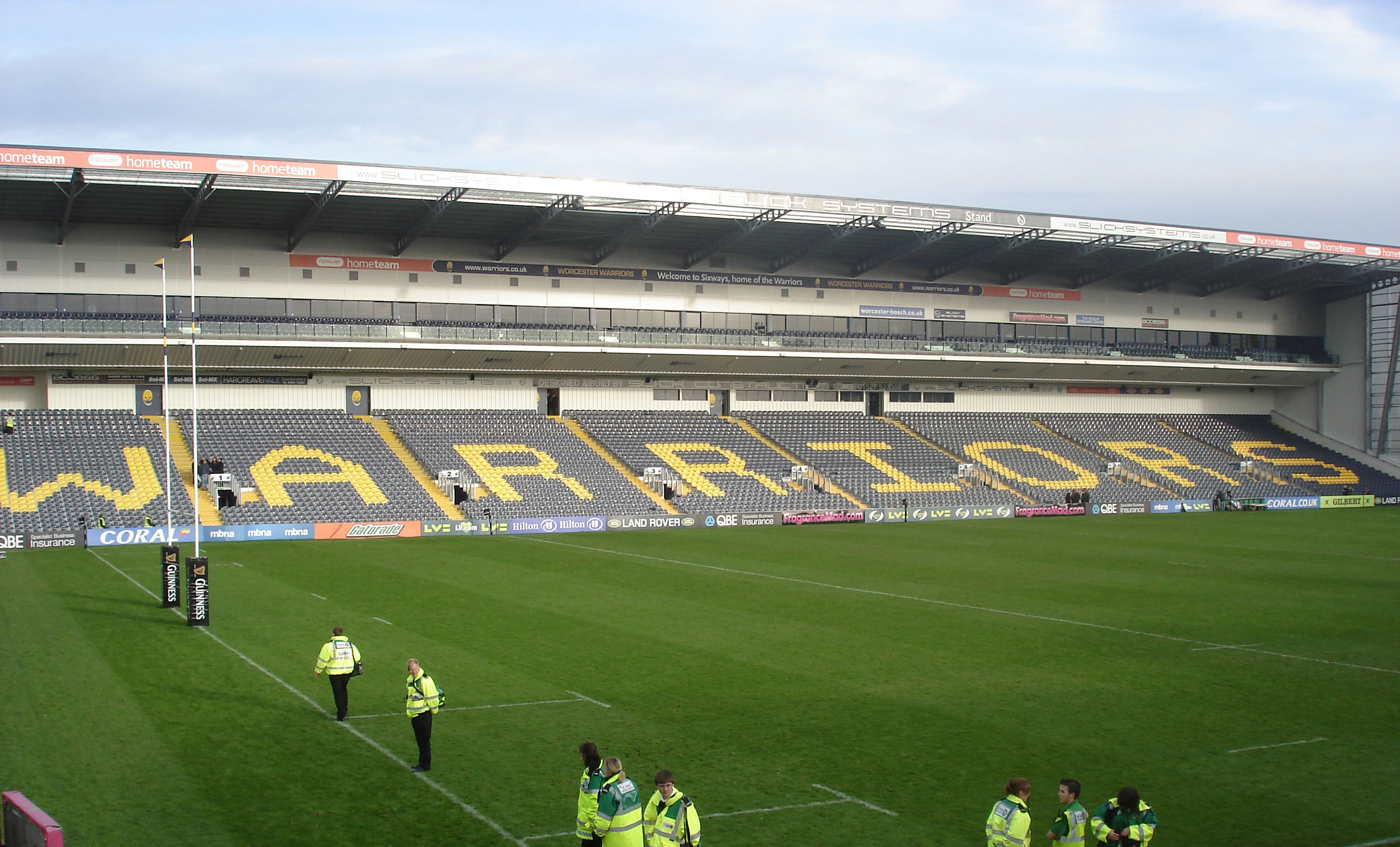
Sixways Stadium, Worcester

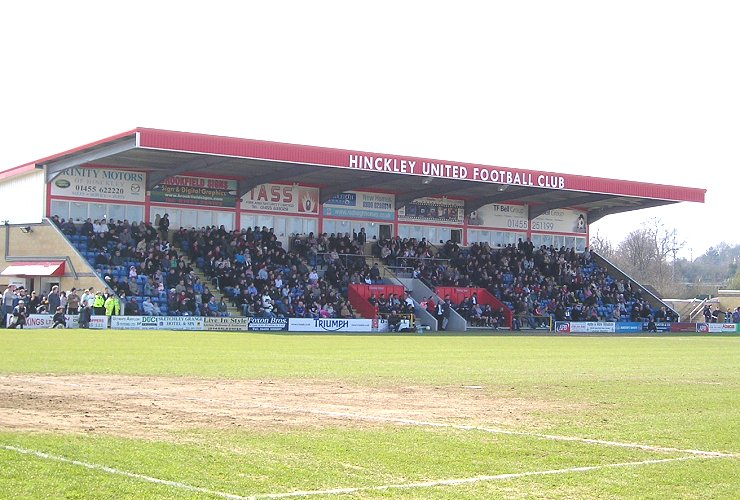
De Montfort Park, Hinckley

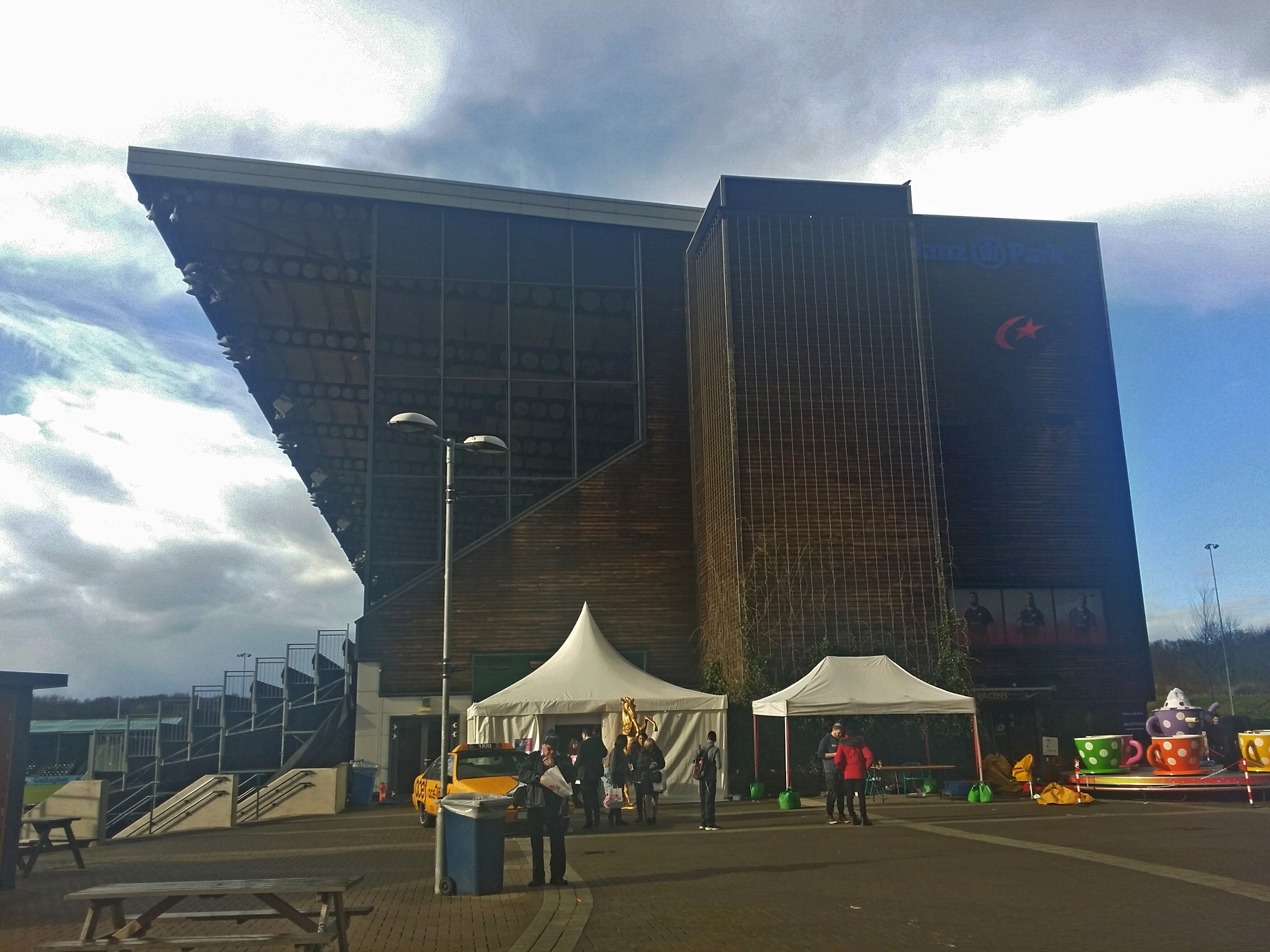
Allianz Park, London

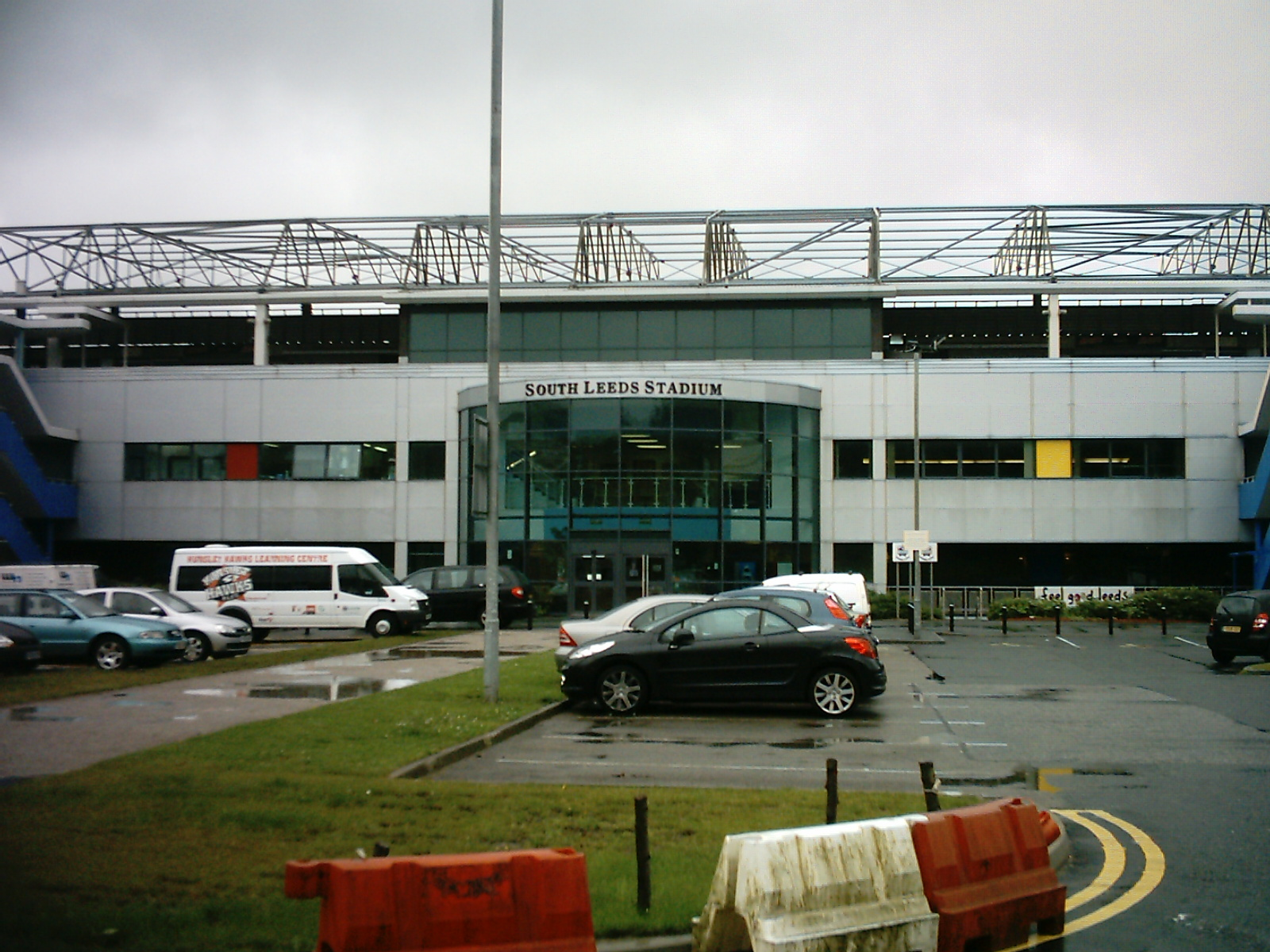
South Leeds Stadium, Leeds

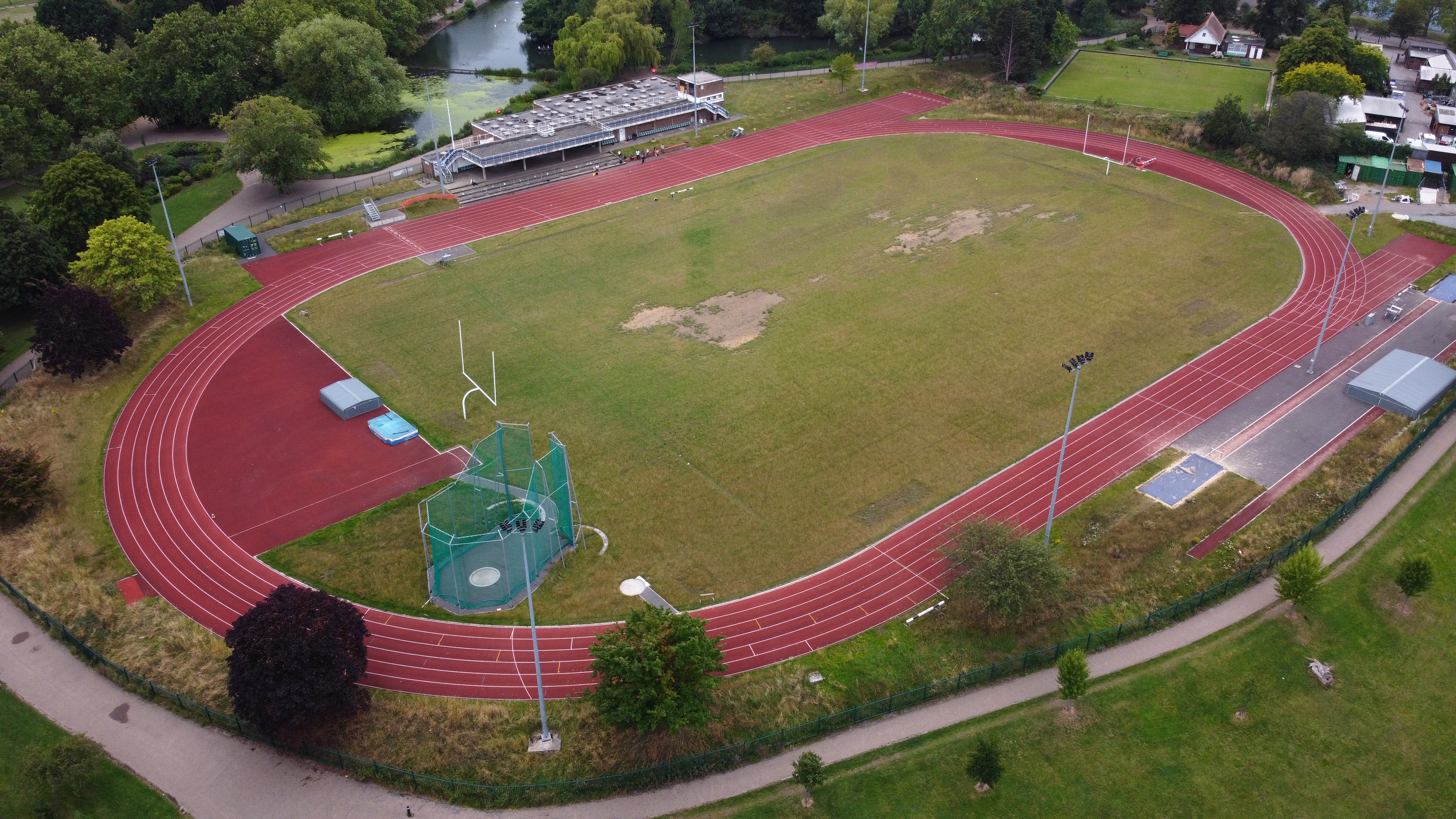
Finsbury Park, London

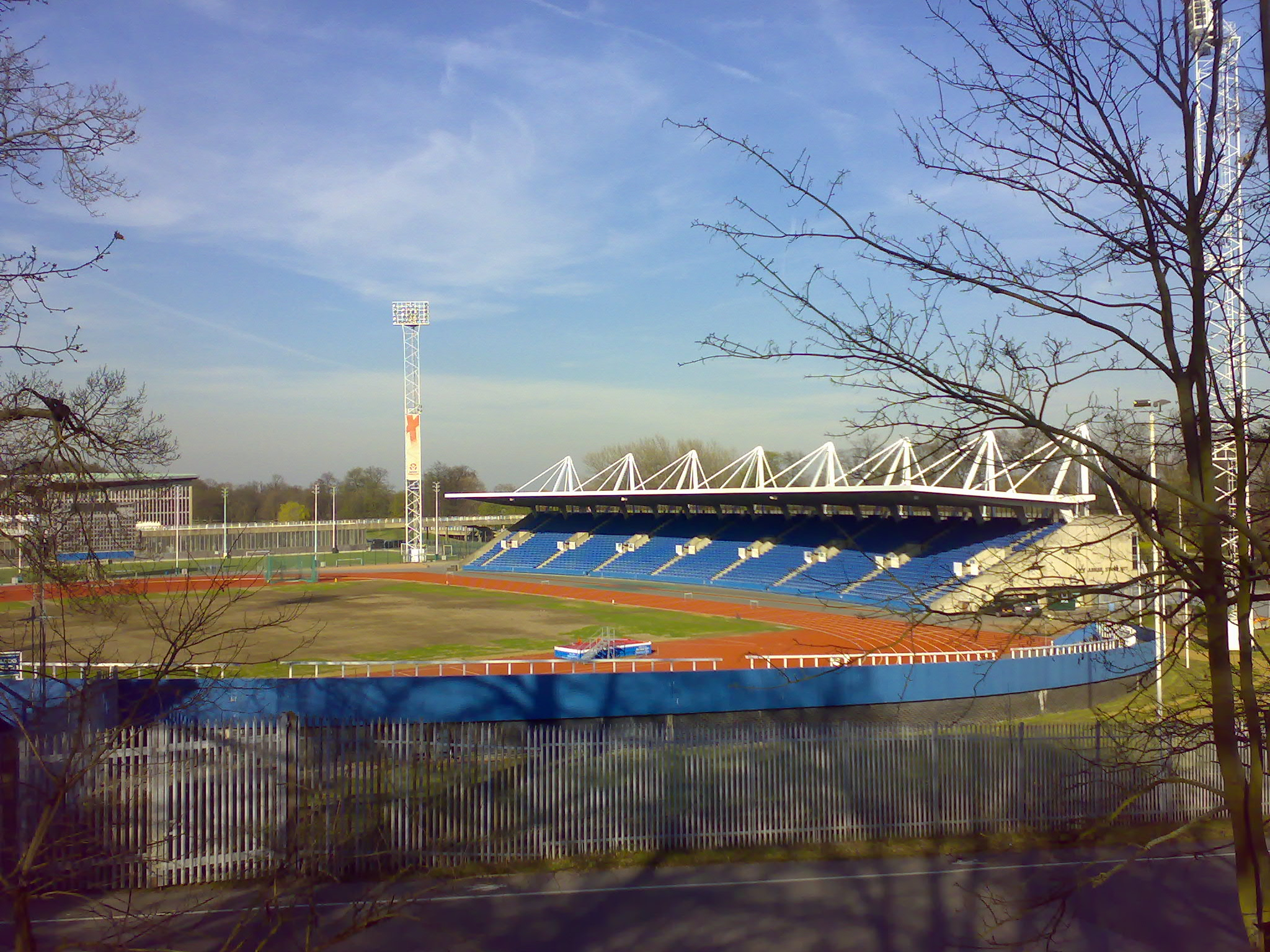
Crystal Palace, London

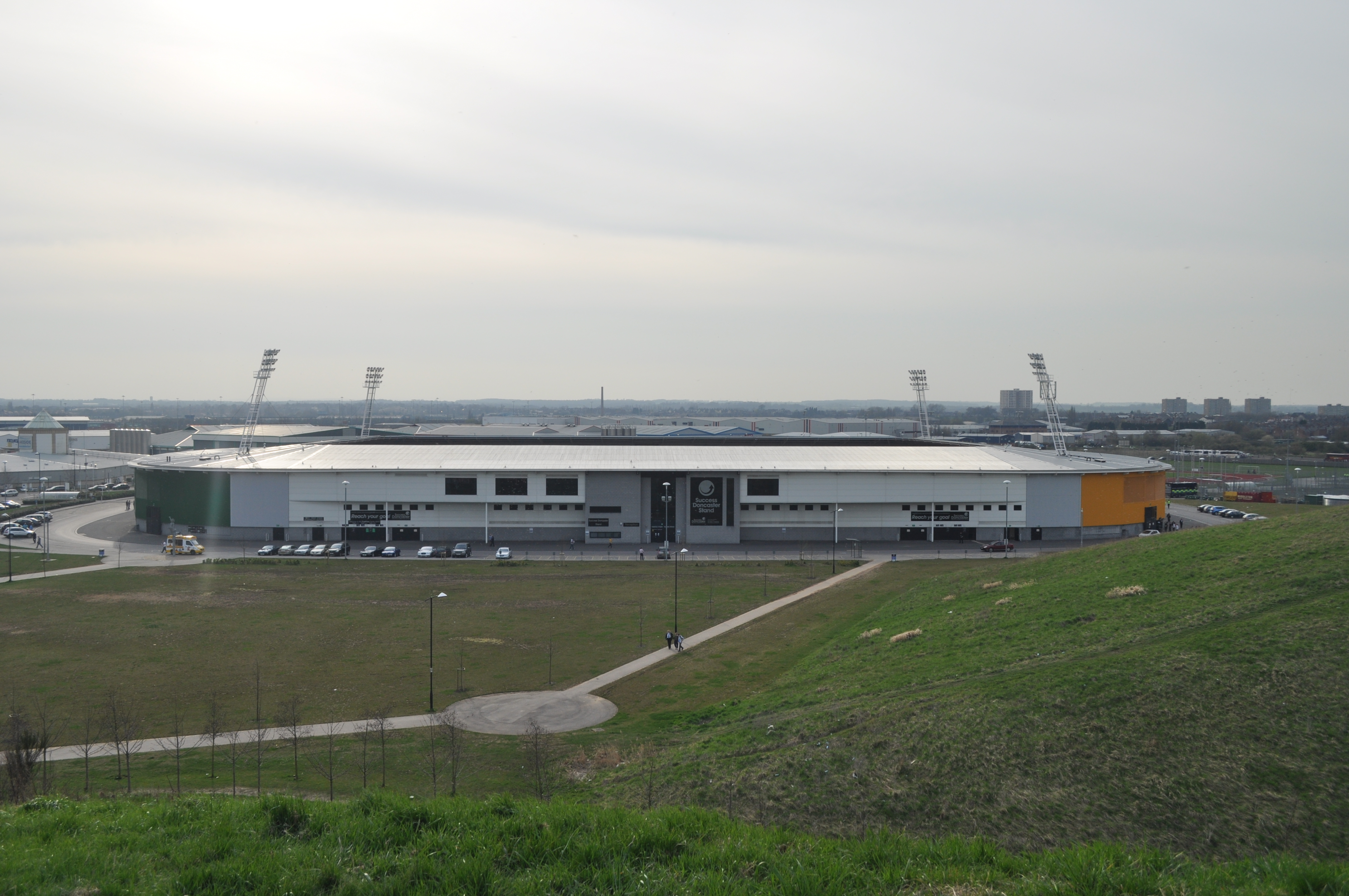
Keepmoat Stadium, Doncaster

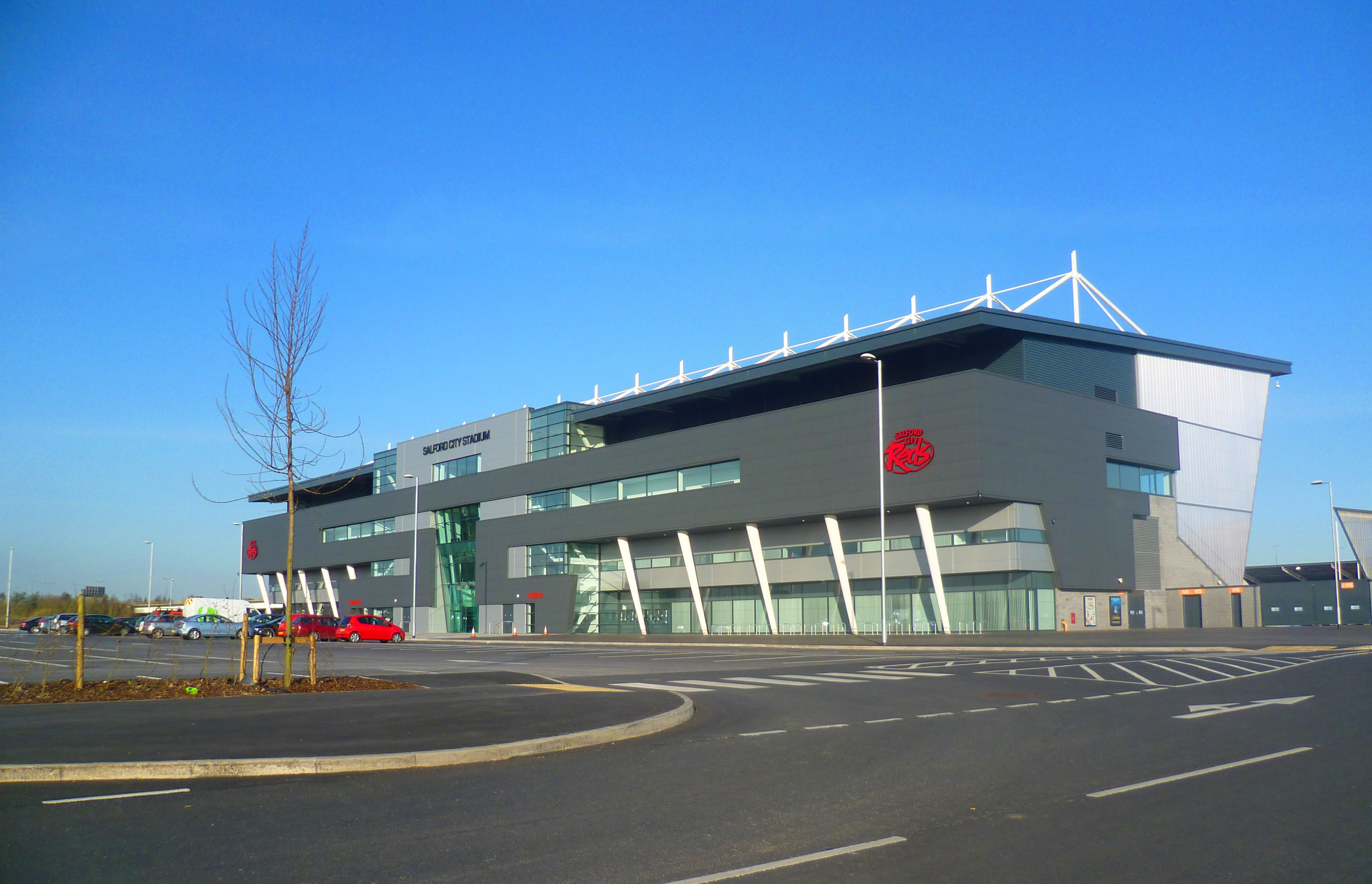
AJ Bell Stadium, Salford

== Teams ==
There are currently 60 teams in the BAFANL who have full membership status. Over the years many teams have formed and folded with only a small handful of original teams from the early 1980s remaining. A lot of teams trace their heritage back through predecessor teams and a large number of BAFA sides have changed their identity on one or sometimes two occasions. Colchester Gladiators (formed in 1983) of Division Two are the oldest team to be operating in their original identity. Other original sides include the Birmingham Bulls, Chester Romans, Nottingham Caesars, East Kilbride Pirates, Ipswich Cardinals and the Crewe Railroaders. Although the London Olympians are the most successful British side, the London Warriors hold the title following on from the BAFANL's official formation in 2010.

Having missed the 2020 season due to the COVID-19 pandemic, BAFA announced that for the 2021 season the BAFANL would be not using the three tier league system and operating from localised Divisions to minimize travel. This means that clubs will not return to their respective divisions until the 2022 season.

=== Premiership ===
2025 BAFA Premiership club locations

The BAFA National League Premiership is the highest level of American football competition in the United Kingdom. The 2025 season includes 11 teams from across England and Scotland, featuring some of the longest-standing and most competitive clubs in the UK gridiron scene.

The BAFANL Premiership for the 2024 season comprises twelve teams, split into the North and South Divisions. The BAFA Premiership North and the BAFA Premiership South. Within each division each team plays each other twice. There will be two rounds of playoff football with the top ranked team in the North hosting the second ranked team in the South, whilst the top ranked team in the South will host the second ranked team in the North. The winners will then compete for the BritBowl. The teams who finish bottom of each division are relegated to Division 1 for the following season and are replaced by both of the Division 1 winners. Teams can be swapped between the North and South Divisions for a following season depending on the geographical location of teams that may be promoted to the division.

==== Premiership North ====
Team	City	Stadium / Home Field	Founded	Head coach
Coventry Phoenix	(England) Coventry, Warwickshire	Nick Newbold Stadium	2004	Neale McMaster
East Kilbride Pirates	(Scotland) Giffnock, East Renfrewshire	Braidholm	1985	Matthew Davies
Manchester Titans	(England) Gorton, Manchester	National Speedway Stadium	2003	George Foster
Merseyside Nighthawks	(England) Skelmersdale, Lancashire	JMO Sports Park	1984	Craig Pennington
Nottingham Caesars	(England) Nottingham, Nottinghamshire	David Ross Sports Village, University of Nottingham	1984	Vanden Warner

==== Premiership South ====
Team	City	Stadium / Home Field	Founded	Head coach
Bristol Aztecs	(England) Filton, Gloucestershire	Stoke Gifford Stadium	1990	Pete Jones
Cambridgeshire Cats	(England) Cambridge, Cambridgeshire	Coldhams Common	1984	Russ Begbie
London Blitz	(England) Finsbury Park, London	Finsbury Park Stadium	1995	Heath Thomas
Rushmoor Knights	(England) Farnborough, Hampshire	Cove School	1985	Peter Fields
Wembley Stallions	(England) Harrow, London	LPOSSA Club	2013	Warren Smart

=== Division One ===
2025 BAFA Division One club locations

The BAFANL Division One is the second tier of British American football, for the 2024 season it holds 30 teams, now divided into 6 divisions, up from 5. The Division has a Northern Football Conference (NFC) and a Southern Football Conference (SFC). The current individual names of the divisions are the NFC 1 Scotland, the NFC 1 North, the NFC 1 Midlands, the SFC 1 West, the SFC 1 East and the SFC 1 Central. The Scottish division was introduced in 2023, in part due to East Kilbride's promotion to the Premier Division in 2022, coupled with Highland Stags' promotion to Division One. Initially this would have led to Highland and Glasgow's alignment with English teams as far south as the Midlands. To counteract this, BAFA automatically promoted the four remaining Scottish Division Two teams in order to make a complete Division One level. Each team plays the others in their division twice during the regular season as well as all teams playing two opponents on three occasions. There are no inter-division games until the play-offs with the top two teams in each division entering into what is potentially a three-game play-off campaign with the initial games being played regionally. The winner of both the northern and southern playoffs will win promotion to the Premier League and then face each other for the Division One bowl game in order to take home the trophy. The team who finishes bottom of each division is relegated to Division Two.

==== NFC 1 Scotland ====
Team	City	Stadium or home field	Founded	Head coach
Aberdeen Roughnecks	(Scotland) Aberdeen, Aberdeenshire	Woodside Sports Complex	2012	Connor Gray
Clyde Valley Blackhawks	(Scotland) Wishaw, North Lanarkshire	Beltane Park	2007	David Yates
Glasgow Tigers	(Scotland) Clydebank, West Dunbartonshire	Clydebank Sports Club	1986	Ryan McCluskey
Inverclyde Goliaths	(Scotland) Greenock, Inverclyde	Ravenscraig Stadium	2016	Martin McClintock

==== NFC 1 North ====
Team	City	Stadium or home field	Founded	Head coach
Chester Romans	(England) Chester, Cheshire	Cheshire County Sports Club	1986	Levi Edwards
Newcastle Vikings	(England) Newcastle upon Tyne	Druid Park	2014	Kevin O'Reagan
Sheffield Giants	(England) Sheffield, South Yorkshire	Sheffield Olympic Legacy Stadium	2008	Toby Chesters
Yorkshire Rams	(England) Leeds, West Yorkshire	South Leeds Stadium	1986	Jason Shaw

==== NFC 1 Midlands ====
Team	City	Stadium or home field	Founded	Head coach
Black Country Steelers	(England) Walsall, West Midlands	Willenhall RFC	2013	Ben Malbon
Leicester Panthers	(England) Leicester, Leicestershire	Leicester Forest East Rugby Club	2006	Stuart Franklin
Northants Knights	(England) Wellingborough, Northamptonshire	Wellingborough OG's Rugby Club	2016	Wayne Gumbs
Shropshire Revolution	(England) Telford, Shropshire	Telford Athletics Stadium	2006	John Angell
Staffordshire Surge	(England) Stoke-on-Trent, Staffordshire	Trentham Fields	2008	Anthony Charles

==== SFC 1 West ====
~ Denotes B/reserve team affiliated to another BAFANL team

Team	City	Stadium or home field	Founded	Head coach
Bournemouth Bobcats	(England) Bournemouth, Dorset	BU Chapel Gate	1985	Steve Rains
~ Bristol Apache	(England) Filton, South Gloucestershire	SGS Sports Field	1990	Pete Jones
Hereford Stampede	(England) Ledbury, Herefordshire	Ledbury RFC	2016	Paul Kent
Solent Thrashers	(England) Southampton, Hampshire	Solent University Test Park Sports Ground	2003	Dave Gibbs
South Wales Warriors	Llanharan, Wales	The Dairy Field	2001	Dean Jackson

==== SFC 1 East ====
~ Denotes B/reserve team affiliated to another BAFANL team

Team	City	Stadium / Home Field	Founded	Head coach
Colchester Gladiators	(England) Colchester, Essex	Corporal Budd VC Gymnasium	1983	Scott Taylor
East Kent Mavericks	(England) Canterbury, Kent	Simon Langton Grammar School	2002	John Moore
Essex Tridents	(England) Rayleigh, Essex	Deanes School	2024	Grant Sammers
Kent Exiles	(England) Bromley, London	Westcombe Park RFC	1990	Junior Hayden
London Olympians	(England) Greenwich, London	Well Hall Stadium	1984	Riq Ayub

==== SFC 1 Central ====
Team	City	Stadium / Home Field	Founded	Head coach
Hertfordshire Cheetahs	(England) Watford, Hertfordshire	Sun Sports Watford F.C.	1986	Rich Moult
~ London Blitz B	(England) Finsbury Park, London	Finsbury Park Stadium	2015	Jack Colleran
Oxford Saints	(England) Abingdon, Oxfordshire	Tilsley Park	1983	Greg Kennedy
Portsmouth Dreadnoughts	(England) Portsmouth, Hampshire	Norway Road, Portsmouth Rugby Football Club	2012	Luke Head-Rapson
Sussex Thunder	(England) Brighton, East Sussex	Sussex University Sports Complex	1997	Billy Walker

=== Division Two ===
2025 BAFA Division Two club locations

The BAFA Division Two is the third tier of British American football with 2024 holding 18 teams across 4 divisions. The Division has a Northern Football Conference (NFC) and a Southern Football Conference (SFC). The current individual names of the divisions are the NFC 2 Midlands, the NFC 2 North, the SFC 2 West and the SFC 2 East. Each team plays the others in their division twice during the regular season as well as all teams playing two opponents on three occasions. Previously teams in Central and East divisions played designated inter-divisional games, with these being the only cross-division games until the playoffs. The top two teams in each division enter into what is potentially a three-game play-off campaign with the initial games being played regionally. The winner of both the northern and southern play-offs will win promotion to Division One and then face each other for the Division Two bowl game in order to take home the trophy.

==== NFC 2 Midlands ====
Team	City	Stadium or home field	Founded	Head coach
Birmingham Bulls	(England) Birmingham, West Midlands	Spring Lane Playing Fields	1983	Matthew Sheldon
Doncaster Mustangs	(England) Doncaster, South Yorkshire	Wheatley Hills Rugby Club	2002	Paul Coley
Leigh Miners	(England) Tyldesley, Greater Manchester	St George's Park	2020	James Higham
Rossendale Bucks	(England) Rossendale, Lancashire	Rossendale Rugby Club, Marl Pits	2021	Alex Murton
Wakefield District Raiders	(England) Pontefract, West Yorkshire	Pontefract RUFC	2014	Zak Constance

==== NFC 2 North ====
Team	City	Stadium or home field	Founded	Head coach
Darlington Steam	(England) Darlington, County Durham	Maiden Castle	2013	Sean Carr
Humber Warhawks	(England) Hull, East Yorkshire	Costello Playing Fields	2014	Alex Moore
Gateshead Senators	(England) Jarrow, South Tyneside	Monkton Stadium	1985	Gary Marshall
Lancashire Buccaneers	(England) Chorley, Lancashire	Chorley Panthers RUFC	1987	Ian Nicolson
Lincolnshire Bombers	(England) North Hykeham, Lincolnshire	North Hykeham Rugby Club	2005	Michael Etheridge

==== SFC 2 West ====
Team	City	Stadium or home field	Founded	Head coach
Cornwall Monarchs	(England) Pool, Cornwall	Pool Academy	2005	Richard Atkinson
Plymouth Vanguard	(England) Plymouth, Devon	Sir John Hunt Community Sports Centre	2024	
Somerset Wyverns	(England) Taunton, Somerset	Victoria Park	2017	Lydon Ward-Best
Swindon Storm	(England) Swindon, Wiltshire	Southbrook Playing Fields	2012	Richard Westley

==== SFC 2 East ====
Team	City	Stadium or home field	Founded	Head coach
Berkshire Renegades	(England) Reading, Berkshire	Woodford Park Leisure Centre	1985	Paul Gordon
Ipswich Cardinals	(England) Ipswich, Suffolk	Northgate Sports Centre	1986	Ian Girling
Norwich Devils	(England) Norwich, Norfolk	Thorpe High School	1984	
Ouse Valley Eagles	(England) Bedford, Bedfordshire	Bedford International Athletics Stadium	2013	Nick Benning

=== Associate teams ===
New teams must undergo an indefinite associate period before they are granted full member status of the national leagues. A number of criteria must be met, involving successfully completing a number of games, recruiting a number of new players, proof of required finances and the creation of a club committee. Associate teams spend their seasons playing each other and League teams in what are essentially friendly fixtures. Some of the current Associate teams are also previous League teams that have dropped out of the BAFANL at some stage.

~ Denotes B/reserve team affiliated to another BAFANL team
* Denotes team that took voluntary demotion from the league back to the associate process
** Denotes team demoted from the league back to associate status by BAFA

Team	City	Stadium or home field	Founded	Head coach
*Edinburgh Wolves	(Scotland) Edinburgh	Peffermill Fields, University of Edinburgh	2002	Victor Peredo

=== Defunct teams ===
Former teams who competed in the BAFANL and have now ceased operating or have merged with other sides to form a current operating side within the present league structure.

Team	City	Founded	Folded	Highest division	Notes
London Warriors	(England) Thornton Heath, London	2007	2026	Premiership	Left BAFA in 2026, joined American Football League Europe.
Bedfordshire Blue Raiders	(England) Bedford, Bedfordshire	2006	2013	Division 1	Merged with the Milton Keynes Pathfinders to form the Ouse Valley Eagles
Burnley Tornados	(England) Burnley, Lancashire	2016	2019	Associate	Failed to gain entry from associate process, club continues at youth level
Bury Saints	(England) Bury St Edmunds, Suffolk	2013	2020	Premier League	Was promoted through the divisions but folded in 2020
Carlisle Border Reivers	(England) Carlisle, Cumbria	2009	2013	Division 2	Following their demise, former members formed the Carlisle Sentinels (renamed Kestrels) in 2014.
Carlisle Kestrels	(England) Carlisle, Cumbria	2014	2022	Division 2	Dropped out of the league before the start of the 2022 season.
Coventry Jets	(England) Coventry, Warwickshire	2004	2018	Premier League	All Jets teams transferred to the Etone Jaguars Youth Academy. The former Jets adult team folded in 2019.
Crewe Railroaders	(England) Crewe, Cheshire	1984	2024	Division 1	Resigned from the League in 2024.
DC Presidents	(England) Chester-le-Street, County Durham	1985	2023	Division 2	Team was not entered in to the 2024 schedule.
Dumfries Hunters	(Scotland) Dumfries, Dumfries and Galloway	2014	2022	Division 2	Folded due to low player retention numbers
Dundee Hurricanes	(Scotland) Dundee, Tayside	2002	2019	Division 1	Resigned league status in 2018, dropped into associate process before folding.
Dunfermline Kings	(Scotland) Dunfermline, Fife	2016	2023	Division 1	Resigned from League several games into 2023 season.
East Essex Sabres	(England) Rayleigh, Essex	2016	2023	Division 2	Merged with the Essex Spartans to form the Essex Tridents
Essex Spartans	(England) South Ockendon, Essex	1998	2023	Division 1	Merged with the East Essex Sabres to form the Essex Tridents
Etone Jaguars	(England) Nuneaton, Warwickshire	2018	2019	Associate	Absorbed the Jets team but folded mid-2019. Club renamed to Nuneaton and youth football continues.
Furness Phantoms	(England) Ulverston, Cumbria	2011	2020	Division 2	Resigned from the league prior to the 2020 season. In 2021 they announced they had merged with Morecambe Bay Storm.
Gloucester Centurions	(England) Gloucester, Gloucestershire	2007	2015	Division 1	Adult side folding in 2015 with the rest of the programme wound up in 2016.
Grimsby Scorpions	(England) Grimsby, North East Lincolnshire	2013	2014	Associate	Merged with fellow associate side Kingston Warhawks to form the Humber Warhawks.
Halton Spartans	(England) Widnes, Cheshire	2014	2023	Division 1	Took voluntary demotion to Associate process then folded.
Highland Stags	(Scotland) Invergordon, Ross and Cromarty	2016	2025	Division 1	Resigned from the League in 2025.
Hastings Conquerors	(England) Hastings, East Sussex	2013	2022	Division 2	Dropped out of the league before the start of the 2022 season.
Hull Hornets	(England) Hull, East Yorkshire	2005	2010	Division 2	Former members later formed the Kingston Warhawks.
Jurassic Coast Raptors	(England) Dorchester, Dorset	2016	2021	Division 2	Folded at the end of the 2021 season due to numbers
King's Lynn Patriots	(England) King's Lynn, Norfolk	2016	2020	Associate	Failed to win a place in the league and folded in 2020
Leeds Bobcats	(England) Leeds, West Yorkshire	2014	2021	Division 1	Adult team formed in 2014, announced merger with Yorkshire Rams to become their development team in 2021
London Hornets	(England) Camden Town, London	2011	2025	Division 1	Resigned from the League
Maidstone Pumas	(England) Maidstone, Kent	1997	2020	Division 2	Assets handed to the Kent Phoenix Youth side who in turn formed the South East Squadron
Manchester Bees	(England) Gorton, Manchester	2019	2021	Associate	Manchester Titans reserve team, never played a competitive game
Milton Keynes Pathfinders	(England) Milton Keynes, Buckinghamshire	2006	2013	Division 2	Merged with the Bedfordshire Blue Raiders to form the Ouse Valley Eagles
Morecambe Bay Storm	(England) Morecambe, Lancashire	2016	2022	Division 2	Folded before the 2022 season due to numbers.
Northumberland Lightning	(England) Ashington, Northumberland	2012	2017	Division 2	Merged with fellow BAFANL side Newcastle Vikings to form the Northumberland Vikings
Peterborough Saxons	(England) Peterborough, Cambridgeshire	2001	2016	Premier Division	Some former members went on to form the South Lincs Lightning in 2020.
Scunthorpe Alphas	(England) Scunthorpe, North Lincolnshire	2018	2026	Premier Division	Promoted to the Premier Division, folded to join forces with Humber Warhawks.
South East Squadron	(England) Maidstone, Kent	2020	2024	Division Two	Took voluntary demotion to Associate Process then folded.
South Lincolnshire Lightning	(England) Bourne, Lincolnshire	2020	2023	Division 2	Formed during the COVID-19 season, were demoted by BAFA back to the associate process in 2023 before folding
Sussex Thunderbolts	(England) Brighton, East Sussex	2020	2022	Division 2	B team for the Sussex Thunder, folded due to player numbers prior to 2022 season.
Torbay Trojans	(England) Torquay, Devon	1983	2023	Division 2	Dropped to Associate status then folded
Welwyn Hatfield Mosquitos	(England) Hatfield, Hertfordshire	2016	2019	Associate	Failed to gain entry into the league and folded as a result
West Coast Trojans	(Scotland) Irvine, North Ayrshire	2004	2018	Division 1	Full programme wound up in 2018. Several former players and coaches formed Inverclyde Goliaths.
Worcestershire Black Knights	(England) Droitwich Spa, Worcestershire	2016	2022	Division 2	Removed by BAFA in 2022.

== Winners ==
=== BritBowl ===
Winners of the Britbowl since the BAFA National Leagues 2010 formation

Team	Season
Bristol Aztecs	2025, 2026
London Warriors	2013, 2014, 2015, 2016, 2018, 2019, 2024
London Blitz	2010, 2011, 2012
Manchester Titans	2022, 2023
Tamworth Phoenix	2017

=== Division One Bowl ===
For some seasons there has been a separate North and South Bowl final.

Team	Season
Bury Saints	2016
Colchester Gladiators	2013
East Kent Mavericks	2026
East Kilbride Pirates	2011, 2022
Farnham Knights	2015
Hertfordshire Cheetahs	2023
Leicester Falcons	2018
Manchester Titans	2017
Merseyside Nighthawks	2014, 2015
Nottingham Caesars	2024
Solent Thrashers	2019
Sussex Thunder	2012
Tamworth Phoenix	2010

=== Division Two Bowl ===
For some seasons there has been a separate North and South Bowl final.

Team	Season
Aberdeen Roughnecks	2018
Berkshire Renegades	2017
Bristol Apache	2022
Bury Saints	2015
Colchester Gladiators	2024
East Kent Mavericks	2023
Hertfordshire Cheetahs	2018
Ipswitch Cardinals	2026
Leicester Falcons	2016
Oxford Saints	2016
Sandwell Steelers	2015
Shropshire Revolution	2017
South Wales Warriors	2011, 2019

== See also ==
- Britbowl
- NFL Europe
- American football in the United Kingdom
- British Universities American Football League
