= Dundee Hurricanes =

Former American Football team based in the United Kingdom (2002–2019)

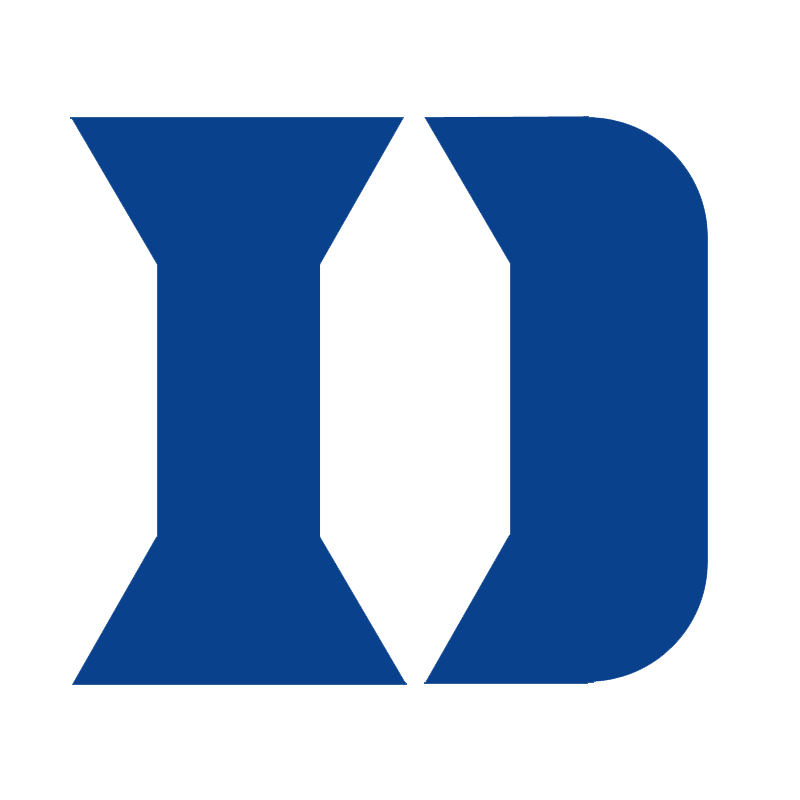
Logo

General information
- Founded: 2002
- Ended: 2019
- Stadium: Dundee North West Community Sports Club, Charlotte Street
- Headquartered: Dundee

League / conference affiliations
- BAFA National Leagues

Championships
- League championships: 0 None
- Division championships: 0 BSL Scottish Division 2 winners 2004 & BAFL Division 2 North winners 2007

Uniform
Home kit

Away kit

The Dundee Hurricanes were an American football team based in Dundee, Scotland who played in the BAFA National Leagues.

In late 2016, the Hurricanes pulled out of the BAFA leagues due to issues with low squad numbers. The Hurricanes are currently rebranding and rebuilding after an extensive overhaul of the club in 2017. The club is set to play several fixtures in 2018 with the ultimate aim being full membership of BAFA, and return to the national leagues. Prior to 2017, since joining the league in 2003, the Hurricanes had qualified for the playoffs in four of their seasons and won two conference championships (2004 & 2007).

== History ==
Hurricanes tackle Yorkshire Rams in 2010

American football in Dundee dates back to the 1980s with the founding of the amateur team, the Dundee Whalers. Later a youth flag football team known as the Dundee Storm was created in 1992. They quickly progressed into 9-on-9 youth kitted football and met with great success, winning four consecutive 9-on-9 Scottish Youth Flag Football championships, 1 Scottish Youth Kitted Championship and reaching the semi-finals of the British Youth championship.

Following these years of success many of the youth players became old enough to play senior football, and so the Dundee Hurricanes were formed in 2002. They immediately applied to enter the BAFL and were admitted into Division 2 North for the 2003 season. They met with initial success, recording consecutive shutouts in their first two matches against the Tees Valley Cougars and Edinburgh Wolves. After that their form was less consistent but they still finished an impressive fourth out of eleven teams in their debut season, recording a 6–4 record.

The club went on to build on that success during 2004, starting off in the best possible way by recording another shutout in their first match away to East Midland Saxons. They lost just twice during the regular season as they finished clear winners of the Scottish Conference. Their good form continued as they beat the Merseyside Nighthawks in their first playoff match, but they were eventually beaten in the semi-final by a single point by the eventual divisional champions Doncaster Mustangs.

In contrast to the previous year, the 2005 season was an inconsistent one. The team began badly, losing their first three games, but that bad start was followed up by five consecutive wins. They eventually finished with a 5-5 record, which was good enough to clinch second place in the Scottish Conference and ensure they qualified for the playoffs again. Unfortunately, they failed to register any points in their quarter-final, going down 0–35 to the Coventry Jets.

2006 was a fairly mediocre one for the Hurricanes as they finished with a 3–4 record. However, there were two positives that team were able to take – during their seven games, the team only conceded 38 points, and by virtue of there only being three teams in their conference, they finished second and therefore qualified for the playoffs again. Unfortunately, just as in the previous year they fell at the quarter-final stage again without scoring a single point, losing 0–6 to the Redditch Arrows.

The Hurricanes finally enjoyed real success in the 2007 season. As part of the divisional reshuffled, the Scottish and Northern conferences were combined into a single six-team conference. After recording a number of heavy wins and finishing with nine wins and just a single defeat, they finished clear winners of their group and so gained a home draw in the playoffs. They made that home advantage count, first defeating East Midland Saxons in the quarter-finals, then thrashing the Manchester Titans in the semi-final to book a place at the divisional final against the Norwich Devils, a team who had gone through the entire season unbeaten and were strongly fancied to win. In a match played at the Don Valley Stadium in Sheffield and broadcast on Five, their opponents scored early and raced into a 20–0 lead at half-time. Despite a second half fightback, the Hurricanes were unable to overturn this deficit. Even though they lost the final, they were still celebrating promotion for the first time in their history.

== Season records ==
Season	Division	Wins	Losses	Ties	PF	PA	Final position	Playoff record	Notes
2003	BAFL Division 2 North	6	4	0	258	128	4 / 11	–	–
2004	BAFL Division 2 North	6	2	1	243	81	1 / 3	Beat Merseyside Nighthawks 71–0 in quarter-final. Lost 12–13 to Doncaster Mustangs in semi-final.	–
2005	BAFL Division 2 Scottish	5	5	0	152	178	2 / 4	Lost 0–35 to Coventry Jets in quarter-final.	–
2006	BAFL Division 2 Scottish	3	4	0	170	38	2 / 3	Lost 0–6 to Redditch Arrows in quarter-final.	–
2007	BAFL Division 2 North	9	1	0	296	117	1 / 6	Beat East Midland Saxons 14–8 in quarter-final. Beat Manchester Titans 50–12 in semi-final. Lost 12–26 to Norwich Devils in final.	Promoted to Division 1 North
2008	BAFL Division 1 North	5	2	3	227	91	3 / 6	—	—
2009	BAFL Division 1 North	2	6	1	133	209	5 / 7	—	—
2010	-	-	-	-	-	-	-	—	—
2011	-	-	-	-	-	-	-	—	—
2012	BAFNL Division 2 North	6	4	0	180	124	3 / 6	—	—
2013	BAFNL National North	0	10	0	105	381	6 / 6	—	—
2014	BAFNL National North	1	8	1	133	349	5 / 6	—	—

== Ground ==
The Hurricanes play their home matches at Dundee Northwest Community Sports Club, located on Charlotte Street, Dundee.

== Documentary: Bend Don't Break ==
Bend Don't Break is a documentary being produced by Fife-based production company Buy The Ticket following the team through their 2014 season after their crushing whitewash season of 2013.
