= Reaver =

Reaver or Reavers may refer to:

== Fictional characters ==
- Reavers (comics), cyborgs in Marvel Comics
- Reaver (Firefly), in the 2002 TV series, and the related movie Serenity
- villains in the 2017 film Logan
- a group of monster hunters in Andrzej Sapkowski's 1992 short story collection Sword of Destiny, part of The Witcher series
- an enemy in The Runelords book series by David Farland
- a pirate lord in the video games Fable II (2008) and Fable III (2010)
- a class specialization in the video game Dark Age of Camelot
- a class specialization in the video game Dragon Age: Inquisition
- a unit in the video game StarCraft
- a bandit faction in the add on for The Elder Scrolls III: Bloodmoon and The Elder Scrolls V: Dragonbornin the video games Morrowind and Skyrim respectively
- an enemy type in the video game God of War 2018
- the New Conglomerate air superiority fighter in the video game PlanetSide 2

== Other uses ==
- The Reavers, a 2007 comic novel by George MacDonald Fraser
- Reaver, a tool used to exploit a vulnerability in Wi-Fi Protected Setup (2012)
- Reaver, an associate of the Reaver Mercenary Company in the mod DiscoveryGC of Freelancer (2003)

== See also ==
- The Reivers (disambiguation)
- Border reivers (disambiguation)
