= Sandwell Steelers =

American Football team based in the United Kingdom

- Founded: 2013; 13 years ago
- League: BAFA National Leagues
- Division: NFC 1 Midlands
- Stadium: Willenhall Rugby Club
- Colours: Black Helmets; White, Black and Yellow Jerseys; Black Pants
- Head coach: Ben Malbon
- Division titles: 4: 2015, 2016, 2019, 2024
- Playoff berths: 6: 2015, 2016, 2017, 2018, 2019, 2024
- Website: www.sandwellsteelers.com

Uniforms
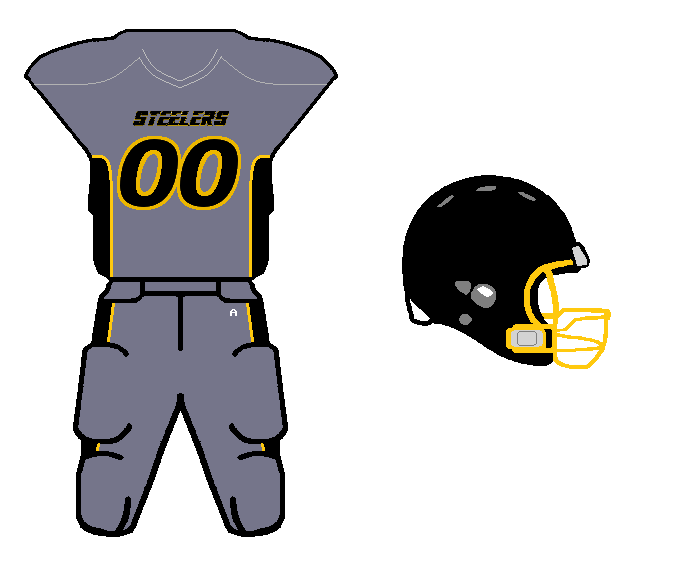

The Sandwell Steelers are an American football team based in Walsall, West Midlands, England, that competes in the BAFA National Leagues NFC 1 South, the second level of British American Football. They operate from Walsall Rugby Club and were formed in 2013. The Steelers earned promotion to Division One in their second ever season an have won 3 Division titles in their 5 years as a BAFA League team. In 2019 they were promoted to the Premier Division North beating Northumberland Vikings in the NFC 1 Bowl game. The club also operate a selection Youth, Junior and Women's American Football teams.

== History ==
The Steelers were formed in 2013, and lost their first game in the associate process to the Shropshire Revolution 42–12. In 2014, they were granted full BAFA status and placed in the National Leagues Central division, in the second tier of the British league structure. They would finish the season bottom of the division with a 2–8 record, defeating the Lincolnshire Bombers and Leicester Falcons in their debut season.

After a realignment in league structure for 2015, the Steelers were placed in the third tier in the NFC2 South. Under head coach Jay Alexander, The Steelers finished with a perfect 10–0 record atop their division, and beat the Leicester Falcons and Newcastle Vikings before defeating the Peterborough Saxons 24–7 in the NFC2 Bowl at the John Charles Centre for Sport in Leeds.

After promotion, they were placed in the Midlands Football Conference 1. They finished with a 9–1 record, and were eliminated from the playoffs by eventual Division 1 National Champions, the Bury Saints. Following this game, Jay Alexander stepped down as head coach, and was replaced by former Birmingham Lion and Steelers' O-Line and assistant head coach, Ross Barrow. After another realignment, the Steelers were placed in the Northern Football Conference 1 South, and were considered amongst the favourites for promotion to the Premier division.

In week two of the 2017 season, the Steelers set a new club record for their biggest victory, defeating the Coventry Jets 71–0. Ahead of the 2018 season, Ross Barrow stepped down from the role of head coach, and was replaced by former Brunel University defensive co-ordinator Maxwell Petitjean.

In 2019, the Steelers completed a perfect regular season in the NFC1 South. In the post-season, they came back from a twenty-point deficit to defeat the East Kilbride Pirates, and defeated the #2 seed Northumberland Vikings in the northern final to secure promotion to the premier division for the first time in their history.

== Facilities ==
The Steelers play their home games and train at Walsall Rugby Club.

== Youth yeam ==
In conjunction with the Birmingham Bulls and the Birmingham Lions, the Steelers field a junior team in national competition.

They field their own youth team in the regional under-17s league, and currently play in the Midlands division. They were entered into competition in 2016, but failed to complete their season.

== Women's team ==
The Sandwell Steelers Women's team was formed in January 2014 and compete in a number of different formats. In August 2014, the team competed in their first friendly game against the Chester Romans at home, securing their first ever victory winning 35–0. In 2015 the team entered the BAFA leagues competing in their first 5v5 full contact Sapphire Series finishing 11th out of 13 teams.

In 2016, the league was restructured due to the influx of new women's teams and the Steelers entered the 5v5 Sapphire Series in Division 2 South, competing in four rounds and eight games. In 2017, the Steelers competed in the 5v5 Sapphire Series in the Division 2 North & West Conference competing in four rounds and eight games and finished with their first ever winning season with a 5–3 record, placing third in the Division 2 North & West.

In 2018, the Steelers moved up to the 7v7 format of the game and competed in the Sapphire Series in the Division 2A North Conference taking part in four rounds and eight games. Sandwell went into Round 4 top of the North so skipped straight to the semi-finals, ultimately winning against the Wembley Stallions 27–7. Sandwell advanced to the finals against the Portsmouth Dreadnoughts and lost 18–14, securing second place in the Division. In 2018/19 the Steelers were promoted to Division 1. The Steelers won their opening game against Portsmouth but lost all subsequent games finishing 3rd in the Conference.

In 2019, some of the Steelers joined ranks with local rival the Birmingham Lions to play an 11v11 fixture against the Arlanda Jets in Stockholm. The game ending 7–0 to Arlanda. A number of the Steelers Women have represented the GB Lions since their inception. Steelers current head coach Sam Rafferty is also defensive line coach for the women's GB team for 2019.

== Hall of Fame ==
The Steelers announced the creation of a Hall of Fame in 2019, with former player, coach and club chairman Anthony Green the inaugural member.

Inductee	Year	Role
Anthony Green	2019	Player, Coach, Chairman
Liz Astley	2022	For her outstanding contributions and service to the Sandwell Steelers

== Seasonal records ==
=== Men's team ===
Season	League	Regular Season Record			Post Season?	Awards
Season	League	Wins	Losses	Ties	Post Season?	Awards
2014	BAFA National Central	2	8	0	No	-
2015	BAFA Northern Conference South 2	10	0	0	Yes	Division Champions, National champions
2016	BAFA Midlands Football Conference 1	9	1	0	Yes	Division Champions
2017	BAFA Northern Conference South 1	7	3	0	Yes	-
2018	BAFA Northern Conference South 1	7	2	1	Yes	-
2019	BAFA Northern Conference South 1	10	0	0	Yes	Division Champions, Conference Champions
2020	BAFA Premier Division North	0	0	0	n/a	Season cancelled due to COVID-19 pandemic
2023	BAFA Northern Conference South 1	0	10	0	No	-
2024	BAFA Northern Conference 2 West	7	1	0	Yes	Division Champions, Conference Champions
Total		52	25	1	All-time regular season record	
Total		1 National 2 Championship, 3 Conference Championships, 4 Divisional Championships				

=== Women's team ===
Season	League	Season Record			Position
Season	League	Wins	Losses	Ties	Position
2015	BAFA Sapphire Series 5v5	2	5	0	11th
2016	BAFA Sapphire Series 5v5, Division 2 South	4	4	0	3rd
2017	BAFA Sapphire Series 5v5, Division 2 North & West	5	3	0	3rd
2018	BAFA Sapphire Series 7v7, Division 2a North	3	2	1	2nd
2018/19	BAFA Sapphire Series 7v7, Division 1 South	1	7	0	3rd
Total		15	21	1	
