= Newcastle Vikings =

American football team based in the United Kingdom

- Founded: 2014; 12 years ago
- League: BAFA National Leagues
- Division: Premiership North
- Team history: Newcastle Vikings (2014–2017,2023–); Northumberland Lightning (2012–2017); Northumberland Vikings (2017–2023)
- Location: Newcastle upon Tyne
- Stadium: Druid Park
- Colours: Black Helmets; Black Jerseys; Black Pants
- Head coach: Connor Joyce; Peter Nichol
- Manager: Janis Ledger
- General manager: Lee Davison
- Championships: Division 1 2023
- Division titles: 2: 2016, 2023
- Playoff berths: 5: 2016, 2017, 2018, 2019, 2022, 2023

Uniforms
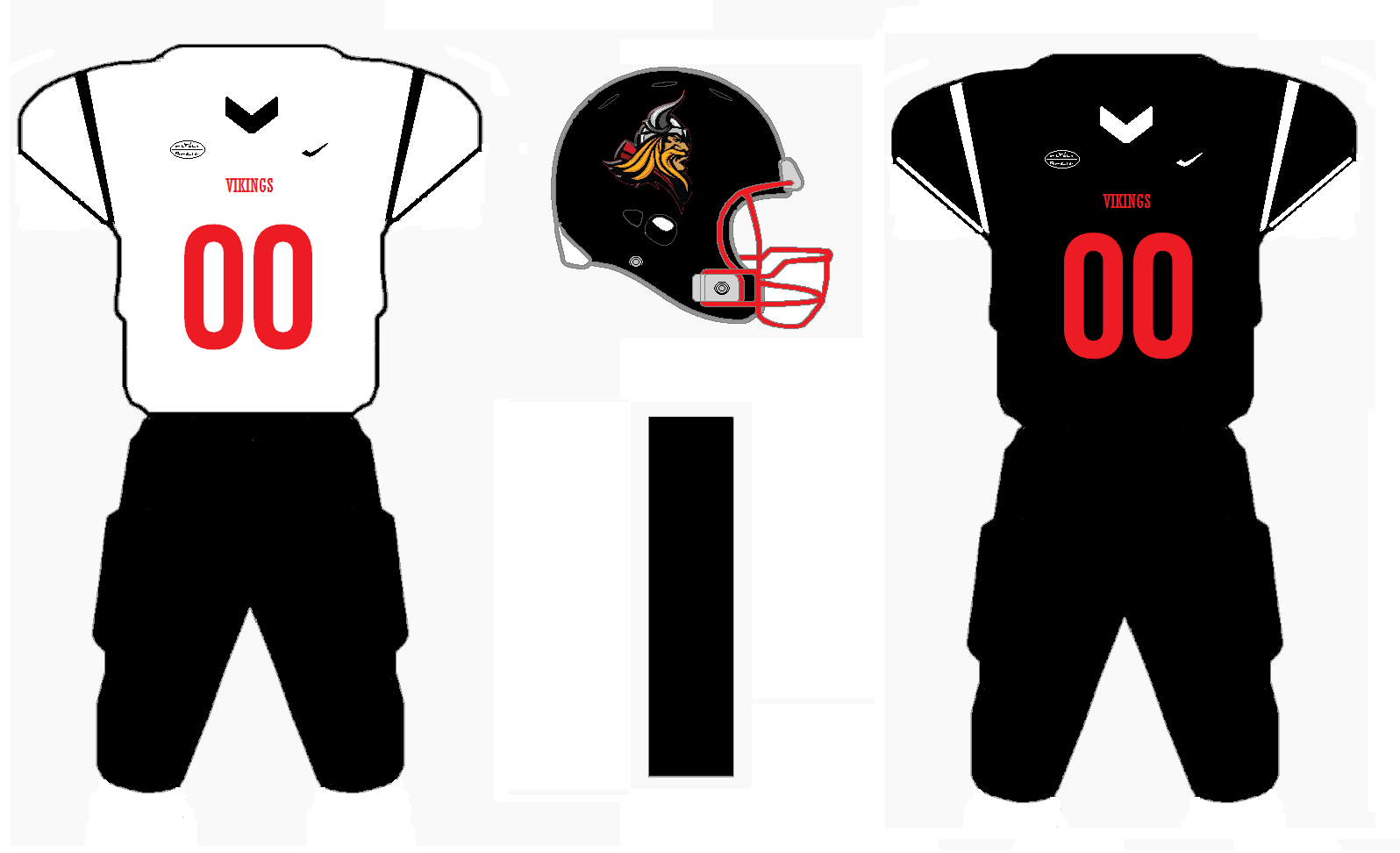

The Newcastle Vikings are an American football team based in Newcastle upon Tyne, United Kingdom, they compete in the BAFA National Leagues Premiership North.

== History ==
The Vikings were founded in 2014. They completed their associate period, playing games against the Yorkshire Rams, East Kilbride Pirates and fellow associate team, the Leeds Bobcats. In the summer of 2014, they announced a partnership with the nearby Northumbria University's American football team, the Mustangs, which saw a number of Viking coaches join the Mustang staff.

In 2014, the Vikings launched a school programme which has attracted over 250 cadet level players, while five youth teams were either formed or joined the Vikings' satellite programme this year. The North Durham Knights, Darlington Steam, Cramlington Phoenix, Washington Predators and the Team Valley Cavaliers have all played at least one fixture internally and provided players for the Vikings BAFANL Youth team.

They were accepted into the league in 2015, and were placed in the newly formed BAFANL Division Two NFC North. Following the 2017 season in which the Vikings were beaten in the Division 1 play-offs, they announced that the club had merged with Division 2 side the Northumberland Lightning and that the club would be known as the "Northumberland Vikings" from the start of the 2018 season.
