= The Reivers (disambiguation) =

The Reivers is a 1962 book by William Faulkner.

The Reivers can also refer to:

- The Reivers (band), an American band
- The Reivers (folkband), a Scottish band
- The Reivers (film), a 1969 film based on the Faulkner novel
- Border Reivers, raiders along the Anglo-Scottish border between the 13th and 16th centuries
- The Reivers, a Scottish cricket franchise in the North Sea Pro Series
- The Reivers, the nickname for sports teams at Iowa Western Community College

== See also ==
- Reaver (disambiguation)
