= Merseyside Nighthawks =

American football team in the United Kingdom

- Founded: 1984; 41 years ago (as Wirral Wolves)
- League: BAFA National Leagues
- Division: Premier Division North
- Team history: Wirral Wolves (1984–1988); Birkenhead Nighthawks (1988–1992); Merseyside Nighthawks (1992–)
- Location: Skelmersdale, Lancashire
- Stadium: JMO Sports Park
- Colours: Red Helmets; Red and Black Jerseys; Black Pants
- Head coach: Craig Pennington

The Merseyside Nighthawks are an American football team representing the county of Merseyside and based in Skelmersdale, Lancashire, England, who operate in the BAFA National Leagues Premier Division North. They play out of the JMO Sports Park. Playing all of their home games in Lancashire, the team train in Liverpool and represent the county of Merseyside.

== History ==
The Merseyside Nighthawks were formed in 1984, originally known as the Wirral Wolves. The team played a large part in the growing popularity of American football in the United Kingdom in the 1980s. The team were undefeated in the 2014 and 2015 season.

The Nighthawks struggled financially in 2020 due to the COVID-19 pandemic in the United Kingdom. They collaborated with a company called Give To Local to raise funds. The team later saw growth by 2023, which they attributed to the growing popularity of American football in the United Kingdom and programmes such as Sky Sports highlighting British players of the sport.
