= Highland Wildcats =

Logo

General information
- Founded: 2002
- Stadium: Bught Park
- Headquartered: Inverness

Personnel
- Head coach: Ben Senior

League / conference affiliations
- BAFA Community Leagues; Scotland

Championships
- League championships: 0 Youth 2011, 2014, 2015
- Division championships: 0 Youth 2010, 2011, 2012, 2013, 2014, 2015, 2018, 2019,2021,2022,2023,2024

Current uniform

Home

The Highland Wildcats is the brand of the Inverness Blitz Academy of American Football which is a registered charity with the Office of the Scottish Charity Regulator. The Inverness Blitz started in 1999 and since then has developed teams and programmes in the area.

In 2006 the Blitz gained charity status with the goals to increase public participation in sport and improve citizenship and community spirit through the use of American football. It was also at this time that the Blitz Development Project was established which saw the organisation employ a full-time development officer and run programmes in primary schools, secondary schools and in volunteer & club development.

The Highland Wildcats was established by the Inverness Blitz in 2002 as a 14- to 16-year-old contact team. In 2008 the brand of the Highland Wildcats was expanded to cover all of the regional teams that represented the Inverness Blitz at a national level. During their time in the National League the Highland Wildcats have won 11 Scottish Championships, one UK Flag Football Championship and three Youth UK Championships.

The Highland Wildcats currently have a Youth team (13-16) and Junior team (16-19) competing in the British American Football Association National League (BAFANL).

As well as this, the Wildcats work in the community in schools and to develop volunteers. Notable current projects include Positive Life Pathways, Young Champions, the Highland Academy Community League and the Development Cadet Camps.

In March 2025, Robert Paulin, a former coach of Highland Wildcats, was found guilty of two charges of arranging or facilitating the involvement in pornography of a person aged under 18. None of the events involved in the conviction took place during any training or group sessions involving the club.
