= Jason Brisbane =

American football player and coach

Profile
- Position: Linebacker

Personal information
- Born: 8 March 1983 (age 43); London, England
- Listed height: 6 ft 2 in (1.88 m)
- Listed weight: 234 lb (106 kg)

Career information
- College: Kingston University
- NFL draft: 2008: undrafted

Career history
- San Diego Chargers (2008)*; London Blitz (2000-2009); Seinajoki Crocodiles (2009); Calanda Broncos (2011)
- * Offseason or practice squad member only

Awards and highlights
- BAFL MVP (2004)

Jason Brisbane is the Chief Executive Officer of Great Britain Wheelchair Rugby and a former American football player and coach. He was signed by the San Diego Chargers as an undrafted free agent in 2008 and spent a year on their practice squad. He also played in the British League, Finland, Switzerland, and Spanish League. In May 2021 Jason was appointed the new CEO of Great Britain Wheelchair Rugby.

== Playing career ==
Brisbane began his playing career in England. Relatively small for the game, he compensated with extra speed, aggression and what coaches like to refer to as 'a nose for the ball' as a linebacker. He quickly played his way into the Great Britain teams at youth and then senior level and in 2004 he set a team record for the London Blitz by recording 22 tackles in a game. He was named the British American Football League's Most Valuable Player in 2004.

In 2008 Brisbane moved to the United States, and was picked up by the San Diego Chargers practice squad, but was released at the end of the season.

In 2009 Brisbane moved to Finland to join the Seinajoki Crocodiles who were midway through their season. Playing in 6 games Brisbane amassed a league leading 7 sacks, and 40 tackles (11 for loss).

At the end of 2009 Brisbane joined the Valencia Firebats (Spain) as a player/assistant defensive coordinator. Brisbane helped the Firebats to a historic win over the Elancourt Templier in the European Football League EFL group stages making them the first Spanish team to reach an EFL quarter-final. They were later defeated by the Swarco Raiders.

In 2011 Brisbane joined British American Football team Leicester Falcons as defensive coordinator. He later signed a contract to play in the Swiss league with the Calanda Broncos where they won the Swiss championship.

In 2012 Brisbane returned to his former team the London Blitz where they reached the quarter-finals of the EFL and defeated the London Warriors in the BritBowl final.
