= Clyde Valley Blackhawks =

American Football team based in the United Kingdom

General information
- Founded: 2007; 19 years ago
- Stadium: Beltane Park, Wishaw
- Headquartered: Wishaw, Scotland
- Colours: Vegas Gold, Black and White

League / conference affiliations
- BAFA National Leagues; NFC 1 Scotland

Current uniform
Home kit

Away kit

Clyde Valley Blackhawks are an American football club based in Wishaw, Scotland. The team operate in the BAFA National Leagues NFC 1 Scotland.

== History ==
The Clyde Valley Blackhawks were established in 2007 as a senior team of the Clyde Valley Hawks youth team. The Blackhawks joined Division 2 of the senior league in 2009 and had a 6–4 record in their first full season. The 2014 season saw the Clyde Valley Blackhawks claim the Division 2 Northern Conference Championship. Winning the title the previous year saw the Blackhawks promoted to Division 1 for the first time in 2015.

The Blackhawks withdrew from league football at the start of the 2016 season After successfully completing three associate games in 2016 the Blackhawks were re-admitted to the National Leagues in 2017. The 2020 season was cancelled due to the COVID-19 pandemic in the United Kingdom, and the 2021 season had a reduced number of games. The team had a full season again in 2022.
