= Halton Spartans =

American football team based in the United Kingdom

- Founded: 2014; 11 years ago
- League: BAFA National Leagues
- Division: NFC 1 Central
- Team history: Runcorn Spartans (2014); Halton Spartans (2015–)
- Location: Widnes, Cheshire
- Stadium: DCBL Stadium
- Colours: Black Helmets; Green and Black Jerseys; Black Pants
- Head coach: Husam Farraj
- General manager: Dave Quinn
- Playoff berths: 2: (2018, 2019)

Halton Spartans
Current uniform
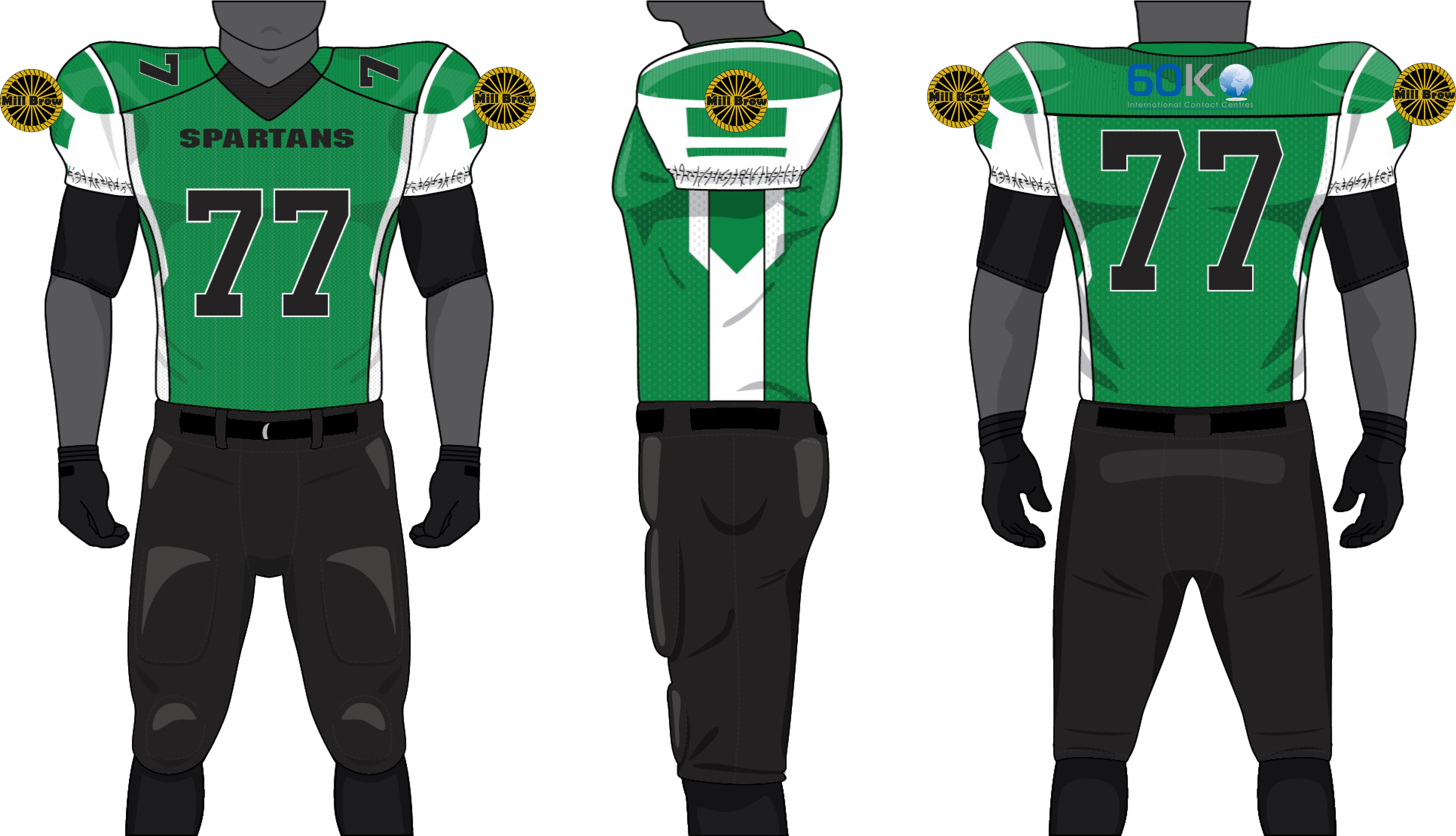

The Halton Spartans are an American football team based in Widnes, Cheshire, England, who compete in the BAFA National Leagues NFC 1 Central, the second level of British American football. They are currently homeless. Formed in 2014 as the Runcorn Spartans the club were elected to the League the following year and went on to win the NFC 2 West title in 2019 earning promotion to Division 1.

== History ==
Initially named the Runcorn Spartans, they were formed in early 2014. The organisation changed their name to their current guise, the Halton Spartans to better represent their recruitment area. They were also more likely to play in nearby Widnes than Runcorn.

Ahead of the 2015 season, Double Coverage, a site that covers American football in Britain made their annual predictions. Only one writer, Richard Penwright, predicted that the Spartans would win their division. This kick-started the "#InRichWeTrust" campaign on Twitter and Facebook. They won their first competitive game, away to the Crewe Railroaders, 24-15. The Spartans went on to complete their first season within the BAFANL with a 5-5 record. It was also noted how well managed the Spartans were for a young britball programme, most obviously for their ability to be able to draw a sizeable crowd for an amateur sport, with numbers varying from 300 to 600 at their peak.

Before the start of the 2017 season, offence coordinator Chris Henry left the Spartans due to work commitments outside of football. Halton recruited Jason Smith to take over, then head coach of Staffordshire Surge. The Spartans endured a disappointing campaign in their third season which ultimately left them with their first ever losing record finishing 4-6. Offence Coordinator Jason Smith left the Spartans midway through the season via mutual consent, with safety Doug Laughton taking the role after retiring from playing at the end of that season.
