= Edinburgh Wolves =

American football team in Scotland, 2002–2025

- Founded: 2002; 24 years ago
- Folded: 2025
- League: BAFA National Leagues
- Division: Premier Division North
- Location: Edinburgh, Scotland
- Stadium: Peffermill Playing Fields
- Colours: Grey Helmets; Grey and Red Jerseys; Grey Pants
- Head coach: Victor Peredo
- Division titles: 3: 2010, 2011, 2016
- Playoff berths: 5: 2010, 2011, 2012, 2014, 2016
- Website: www.edinburghwolves.com

The Edinburgh Wolves were an American football team based in Edinburgh, Scotland, that competed in the BAFA National Leagues Premier Division North, the highest level of British American Football. The team operated from the Peffermill Playing Fields. The team dissolved in early 2025.

== History ==
The Edinburgh Wolves were originally formed in 2002 by a group of eight people who had previously played flag football. The name of the team was adopted from the previous flag football team. The club was accepted into the British Senior League in November 2002. The club moved to the BAFA Community League in 2010 after BAFL went into administration.

The Wolves competed in the 2003, 2004 and 2005 seasons of the BAFL. The club left the league in 2006 due to a lack of linemen before returning to the BAFL in 2007.
