= Doncaster Mustangs =

American Football team based in the United Kingdom

- Founded: 2002; 24 years ago
- League: BAFA National Leagues
- Division: NFC 2 South
- Team history: South Yorkshire Mustangs (2008–2009); Doncaster Mustangs (2002–2008, 2009–)
- Location: Doncaster, South Yorkshire, England
- Stadium: Wheatley Hills RUFC
- Colours: Gold Helmets; Green and White Jerseys; Green pants
- Head coach: Martyn Richmond
- General manager: Mark Blyth
- Division titles: 1: 2004
- Playoff berths: 5: 2004, 2005, 2009, 2011, 2013

The Doncaster Mustangs are an American football based in Doncaster, South Yorkshire, England who compete in the BAFA National Leagues NFC 2 South, the third level of British American football. They play their games at Wheatley Hills Rugby Union club. They were formed in the autumn of 2002 and during the 2008 season they were known as the South Yorkshire Mustangs. During their history, the club has also been based out of Retford, Nottinghamshire.

== Team colours ==
Home Kit Vegas Gold Helmet - Black Face cage, Green Jersey, White numbers Green Pants, Black Socks.

Away Kit Vegas Gold Helmet - Black Face cage, White Jersey, Gold numbers Green Pants, Black Socks.

== Home field ==
They play their games at Wheatley Hills Rugby Union club, having previously used the Keepmoat Stadium Athletics Field, the home of Doncaster Rovers. During their history, the club has also been based out of Retford, Nottinghamshire.

== Season records ==
Season	League	Level	Regular season record			Postseason	Notes
Season	League	Level	Wins	Losses	Ties	Postseason	Notes
2003	BSL Division 2 North	2	4	6	0	–	–
2004	BSL Division 2 North	2	8	1	0	Yes	Division Two champions, Promoted to Division 1
2005	BAFAL Division 1A North	1	6	4	0	Yes	Semi-finalists
2006	BAFAL Division 1A North	1	2	8	0	–	–
2007	BAFAL Division 1A North	1	1	9	0	–	–
2008	BAFAL Division 1A North	1	3	7	0	–	–
2009	BAFAL Division 1A North	1	7	3	0	Yes	Quarter finalists
2010	BAFACL Division 1A North	1	4	6	0	–	–
2011	BAFACL Division 1A North	1	8	2	0	Yes	Quarter Finalists
2007	BAFANL Premiership North	1	6	3	0	Yes	Quarter Finalists
2013	BAFANL Premiership North	1	6	4	0	Yes	Quarter Finalists
2014	BAFANL Premiership North	1	0	9	0	–	Relegated to Division 1
2015	BAFANL NFC Division 1 North	2	4	6	0	–	–
2016	BAFANL MFC Division 1	2	4	6	0	–	–
2017	BAFANL NFC Division 1 North	2	2	7	1	–	–
2018	BAFANL NFC Division 1 South	2	2	7	1	–	–
2019	BAFANL NFC Division 1 South	2	0	10	0	–	Relegated to Division 2
2020	BAFANL NFC Division 2 South	3	0	0	0	–	Season cancelled due to COVID-19 pandemic.
2021	BAFANL White Rose	–	3	5	0	–	Exhibition season due to COVID-19 pandemic.
2022	BAFANL NFC Division 2 South	3	2	6	0	–	–
Total			72	102	2	All-time regular season record	

== See also ==
- British American Football League
- BAFA National Leagues (formerly BAFA Community Leagues)
- BritBowl
