= List of Birmingham Bulls seasons =

This is a list of seasons completed by the Birmingham Bulls American football team, currently of the BAFA National Leagues (BAFANL). The list documents the season-by-season records of the Bulls' franchise from 1985 to present, including postseason achievements.

The Bulls were founded in 1983 and first entered league competition in 1984. They have won 4 national championships and 19 division championships, although their last success in either forum came in 2006, last making the play-offs in 2011. Throughout their history, they have gone undefeated three times, and had no winless seasons.

They appeared in the inaugural 1986 Bud Bowl against the Glasgow Lions, and in Bud Bowl III against the London Olympians, winning both times. In 1991, they again defeated the London Olympians in the NDMA Coke Bowl and defeated them for a third time in the 1995 BAFA Division 1 Bowl. They were defeated by the Manchester Spartans in Bud Bowl IV in 1989, and by the London Olympians in the 1994 BAFA Division 1 Bowl and both the 1999 and 2000 BSL Division 1 Bowl.

== Seasons ==
Season	League	Regular Season Results			Post Season?	Awards
Season	League	Wins	Losses	Ties	Post Season?	Awards
1984	Merit Table	4	3	0	No	n/a
1985	AFL Midlands Division	12	0	0	Yes	Division Champions
1986	BAFL National League Central Conference	10	2	0	Yes	Division Champions, National champions
1987	Budweiser League National Division Western Conference	7	3	0	Yes	Division Champions
1988	Budweiser League National Division Midlands Conference	12	1	1	Yes	Division Champions, National champions
1989	Budweiser League Midlands Conference	9	1	0	Yes	Division Champions
1990	NDMA Northern Conference	9	1	0	Yes	Division Champions
1991	NDMA Northern Conference	9	1	0	Yes	Division Champions, National champions
1992	NDMA Southern Conference	9	1	0	Yes	Division Champions
1993	NDMA Central Conference	6	4	0	No	n/a
1994	BAFA Division One	6	4	0	Yes	Division Champions
1995	BAFA Division One	9	1	0	Yes	Division Champions, National champions
1996	BSL Division Two Northern Conference	10	0	0	Yes	Division Champions
1997	British Independent Gridirion Conference	3	3	0	Yes	n/a
1998	BSL Division One Northern Conference	9	1	0	Yes	n/a
1999	BSL Division One National Conference	5	2	0	Yes	Division Champions
2000	BSL Division One Northern Conference	7	1	0	Yes	Division Champions
2001	BSL Division One Northern Conference	5	3	0	Yes	Division Champions
2002	BSL Division One Northern Conference	8	2	0	Yes	Division Champions
2003	BSL Division One Northern Conference	7	3	0	Yes	Division Champions
2004	BSL Division One Northern Conference	8	1	1	Yes	Division Champions
2005	BSL Division One Northern Conference	10	0	0	Yes	Division Champions
2006	BSL Division One Northern Conference	7	3	0	Yes	Division Champions
2007	BSL Premier Division	5	4	1	No	n/a
2008	BSL Premier Division	1	7	0	No	n/a
2009	BAFA Community Leagues Division One	4	6	0	No	n/a
2010	BAFA Community Leagues Division One	2	8	0	No	n/a
2011	BAFA Community Leagues Division One	9	1	0	Yes	n/a
2012	BAFA Premier Division Northern Conference	1	7	2	No	n/a
2013	BAFA Premier Division Northern Conference	2	8	0	No	n/a
2014	BAFA Premier Division Northern Conference	4	5	0	No	n/a
2015	BAFA Division One SFC North	4	6	0	No	n/a
2016	BAFA MFC1	4	6	0	No	n/a
2017	BAFA NFC 1 South	1	8	0	No	n/a
2018	BAFA NFC 2 South	7	1	0	Yes	n/a
2019	BAFA NFC 2 South	8	0	0	Yes	Division Champions
Total		233	108	5	All-time regular season record (1984–2016)	
Total		4 National Championships, 20 Divisional Championships				
