= NFL London =

NFL London may refer to:

- A potential London NFL franchise
- NFL London Games, played as part of the NFL International Series
