= Russ Jensen =

American football player (born 1961)

No. 18
- Position: Quarterback

Personal information
- Born: July 13, 1961 (age 65); La Mirada, California, U.S.
- Listed height: 6 ft 2 in (1.88 m)
- Listed weight: 215 lb (98 kg)

Career information
- College: California Lutheran University
- NFL draft: 1983: undrafted

Career history
- Los Angeles Express (1983–85); Los Angeles Raiders (1985–86); San Diego Chargers (1987); Birmingham Bulls (1988–89)

Russ Jensen (born 13 July 1961) was a former professional American football player most noted for his time in the British leagues where he is considered one of the greatest players ever. He had also spent time in the NFL before his time in UK.

== College ==
Jensen was recruited to play at San Francisco State, but transferred to the Cal Lutheran Kingsmen in his senior year. As the starting quarterback, he led the Kingsmen to the Division II playoffs where they met the Linfield College Wildcats in the first round. Jensen set NAIA playoff records in pass attempts (57), pass completions (35) and passing yards (437), but also tied the record for interceptions with 7. They lost to the eventual 1982 champions 20-16.

Jensen was an NAIA All-American Honorable Mention in 1982 and set Kingsmen records in passing yardage and passing touchdowns.

== Professional career ==
=== Los Angeles Express ===
Jensen was not drafted in the 1983 NFL draft, but was selected in the USFL Territorial Draft by the Los Angeles Express.

He spent most of his time buried beneath Frank Seurer and future NFL Hall of Famer Steve Young, and during his time with the Express threw just 6 passes, for 2 completions of 33 yards, 0 touchdowns and 1 interception.

=== Los Angeles Raiders ===
Despite his limited playing time in the USFL, Jensen got a chance to make the Los Angeles Raiders roster in the 1985 off season. Jensen was in competition with Rusty Hilger and former first round draft pick Rich Campbell to back up Jim Plunkett and Marc Wilson. He suffered a broken thumb in a scrimmage with the Dallas Cowboys at his college's facilities in Cal Lutheran, and spent only a limited time on the roster.

=== San Diego Chargers ===
During the 1987 "strike" season, Jensen made the roster of the San Diego Chargers as a non-union player. He had been working in construction and minor acting roles on the show 1st & Ten when he was contacted by the Chargers.

=== Birmingham Bulls ===
In 1988, the GM of the Birmingham Bulls of the British Budweiser League, Frank Leadon, brought Jensen over to the UK. Jensen immediately made the Bulls national contenders again.

Jensen threw for 2925 yards, 35 touchdowns (including 7 in a single game against the Manchester Allstars) and rushed for another 13 in the 1988 season, setting franchise records. 2051 of those yards and 22 of those touchdowns were caught by fellow import Greg Harris. In 1988, the Bulls won their second national championship, defeating the London Olympians 30-6 at Loftus Road on the back of Jensen's three touchdown passes.

In 1989, Jensen initially refused terms with the Birmingham Bulls, but signed just before the start of the season, teaming up with another fellow import, this time wide receiver Bob Shoop, throwing 2276 passing yards and 20 touchdowns, leading the Bulls to another national championship game, against the Manchester Allstars at Crystal Palace. However, two days before the final, Jensen left the team due to a dispute with Bulls owner Dave Webb over medical bills. Jensen never played for the Bulls again and then GM and lineman James Thornton placed the blame on the Bulls management.

== Coaching career ==
During his time in the UK, Jensen also coached at the Bulls, and instilled much needed discipline and was known for being a "hard task master" who "craved perfection".

== Honours and records ==
- Britball Now Hall of Fame
- Most Touchdown Passes in Birmingham Bulls History
- Most Pass Completions in Birmingham Bulls History
- Most Pass Yards in Birmingham Bulls History

== Personal life ==
Jensen lives in La Mirada, California and has two children with his wife, Isabel.
