= Paul Roberts (American football) =

British gridiron football player (born 1963)

No. 23
- Position: Cornerback

Personal information
- Born: December 20, 1963 (age 62); Birmingham, United Kingdom

Career history
- Birmingham Bulls; Redditch Arrows

Awards and highlights
- 1991 All-Europe Team; Britball Now All–time British All star Squad

Paul Roberts (born 20 December 1963, Birmingham, United Kingdom) is a former British American football defensive back who played for the Birmingham Bulls, Redditch Arrows and also internationally for the GB Lions. Roberts is regarded by the Britball community as one of the best defensive backs to play the game in Britain.

== Playing career ==
Roberts joined the Bulls in 1985.

In 1988, Roberts picked off then-Leicester Falcons quarterback Sean Payton to secure a 19-14 win. In April of that year, Roberts, along with Joe St. Louis of the London Ravens were to be flown to Chicago for trials with the Chicago Bears and Pittsburgh Steelers. It was this year that Roberts set a record of 8 turnovers, 5 interceptions and 3 fumble recoveries, that would stand for 27 years.

Roberts was instrumental in the Bulls' win over the Nottingham Hoods in the 1991 semi-final, intercepting the ball twice and returning one for the winning score. In 1994, Roberts intercepted the ball 8 times, then a record, since matched by Gareth Thomas.

Roberts last played for the Bulls in 2006.

Following his move to the Arrows in 2008, Roberts came out of retirement and found himself on the active roster.

=== International career ===
Roberts made his debut for the GB Lions in 1986 against the Netherlands in a series of two victories in the European Nations Championship Qualifier.

Roberts was part of the Lions squad that defeated France 26-0 at the Alexander Stadium to secure their place in the 1987 European Nations Championship.

He was also selected to be a part of the final victorious squad for the 1991 European Nations Championship in Finland, and was one of eight Lions selected to the All-Europe team.

== Coaching career ==
Roberts joined former team, the Redditch Arrows, as a defensive backs coach in 2008.

Roberts returned to the Bulls in 2011 under head coach Steve Hannington as a defensive backs coach alongside former Bulls and Arrows teammate Mark Williams. When former Arrows coach Ian Hill took over the reins in 2012, Roberts stayed on as a defensive backs coach for the 2013 and 2014 seasons.

When new head coach Mark Pagett installed his staff for 2015, Roberts remained as defensive backs coach.

Under his tutelage, Bulls defensive backs have represented the GB Lions national team and others have broken Bulls records for interceptions and takeaways set by Roberts himself during his playing days. Several defensive backs to have played under Roberts have received Team or Defensive MVP awards.

== Achievements ==
=== Honours ===
- 1991 All-Europe Team
- BritballNow Alltime British Allstar Squad

=== Records ===
- Most Takeaways in Birmingham Bulls history
- T-Most Fumble Recovery Touchdowns in Birmingham Bulls history
- Most Interceptions in Birmingham Bulls history
- Most Kick Return Yards in Birmingham Bulls history
- T-Most Kick Return Touchdowns in Birmingham Bulls history
- Most Punt Return Yards in Birmingham Bulls history
- Most Punt Return Touchdowns in Birmingham Bulls history
