= Steve Pisarkiewicz =

American gridiron football player (born 1953)

No. 15, 19
- Position: Quarterback

Personal information
- Born: November 10, 1953 (age 72); Florissant, Missouri, U.S.
- Listed height: 6 ft 2 in (1.88 m)
- Listed weight: 205 lb (93 kg)

Career information
- High school: McCluer (MO)
- College: Missouri
- NFL draft: 1977: 1st round, 19th overall pick

Career history
- St. Louis Cardinals (1977–1979); Green Bay Packers (1980); Winnipeg Blue Bombers (1982); Philadelphia Stars (1983–1984); Orlando Renegades (1985); Cardiff Tigers (1986–1988); Birmingham Bulls (1989); Barcelona Boxers (1990)

Awards and highlights
- Second-team All-Big Eight (1975)

Career NFL statistics
- Passing attempts: 143
- Passing completions: 64
- Completion percentage: 44.8%
- TD–INT: 3–7
- Passing yards: 804
- Passer rating: 49.4
- Stats at Pro Football Reference

Stephen John Pisarkiewicz (/pɪˈzɑːrkəwɪts/ piz-AR-kə-wits; born November 10, 1953) is an American former professional football player who was a quarterback in the National Football League (NFL). He played college football for the Missouri Tigers and was selected by the St. Louis Cardinals in the first round of the 1977 NFL draft with the 19th overall pick. In addition to the NFL, Pisarkiewicz played in the Canadian Football League (CFL), United States Football League (USFL), BAFA National Leagues in Britain and Liga Nacional de Fútbol Americano in Spain during his career.

== College career ==
After graduating from McCluer High School in Florissant, Missouri, Pisarkiewicz was recruited by Tennessee but joined the Missouri Tigers; he was considered the best passer at Missouri since Paul Christman and drew attention from NFL scouts. In 1975, Pisarkiewicz led the Big 8 in passing yards, and was second in passing touchdowns.

== Professional career ==
=== NFL ===
Pisarkiewicz was drafted 19th overall by the St. Louis Cardinals in the 1977 NFL draft, apparently at the insistence of owner Bill Bidwill. Expected to take over the starting job from the aging Jim Hart, he failed to impress head coach Bud Wilkinson and started just four games in his time in St. Louis.

After leaving St. Louis, Pisarkiewicz played in one game in 1980 for the Green Bay Packers.

=== CFL ===
In 1982, Pisarkiewicz was picked up by the Winnipeg Blue Bombers. However, his opportunities there proved limited and he soon moved back to the US.

=== USFL ===
Pisarkiewicz spent 1983 with the Philadelphia Stars but again found playing time limited. He was given two years probation in the same year after pleading guilty to an incident of indecent exposure in Clayton, Missouri.

He spent time in 1985 with the Orlando Renegades.

== Europe ==
=== Cardiff Tigers 1986–1988 ===
In 1986, Pisarkiewicz moved to the United Kingdom and played for the Cardiff Tigers in the Welsh capital. The then-33 year old served as the starting quarterback and a coach. In 1987, the Tigers finished 7–5, while in 1988, Pisarkiewicz threw 44 passing touchdowns.

=== Birmingham Bulls ===
In 1989, following the dissolution of the Cardiff Tigers, Pisarkiewicz joined the Birmingham Bulls. Due to the absence of starting quarterback Russ Jensen. Pisarkiewicz salary was the highest in British American football. Pisarkiewicz played in one game for the Bulls, against the Dublin Celts before resigning due to internal strife.

=== Dublin Celts ===
Pisarkiewicz joined the Dublin Celts as their head coach and general manager. He coached the Celts to the playoffs, before swiftly departing for the United States where he presented the Celts with an ultimatum.

=== Barcelona Boxers ===
In 1990, after leaving the Celts, Pisarkiewicz became quarterback for the Barcelona Boxers in Spain.
