= Paul Roberts =

Paul Roberts may refer to:

- Paul Roberts (musician) (born 1959), British musician, ex-lead singer of The Stranglers
- Paul Roberts (choreographer) (1972/1973–2025), English choreographer
- Paul Roberts, British musician with rock group Sniff 'n' the Tears
- Paul Roberts, British musician with house music group K-Klass
- Paul Roberts (footballer, born 1962), English footballer for several teams in the Football League
- Paul Roberts (footballer, born 1977), Welsh footballer
- Paul Roberts (author), American journalist and author on resources such as oil and food
- Paul V. Roberts (1938–2006), American environmental engineer
- Paul H. Roberts (1929–2022), British physicist
- Paul Craig Roberts (born 1939), American economist
- Paul Roberts (cricketer) (1951–1977), English cricketer
- Paul William Roberts (1950–2019), Canadian writer born in Wales
- Paul Roberts (American football) (born 1963), British American football defensive back
- Paul Roberts (rugby league) (born 1962), Australian rugby league player

== See also ==
- Paul Robert (disambiguation)
