= Paul Robert =

Paul Robert may refer to:

- Paul Robert (lexicographer) (1910–1980), French lexicographer
- Paul Robert (fencer), Swiss Olympic fencer
- Léo-Paul Robert (1851–1923), Swiss painter

== See also ==
- Paul Roberts (disambiguation)
