= Mark Webb (placekicker) =

British gridiron football player (born 1960)

No. 20
- Position: Kicker

Personal information
- Born: 7 August 1960 (age 66); Birmingham, England

Career history
- Birmingham Bulls (1986–1992)

Awards and highlights
- Birmingham Bulls Hall of Fame; 1991 All-Europe Team

Mark "Spider" Webb (born 7 August 1960) is a former British American football kicker regarded by some as one of the best kickers in British history. He played his entire career for the Birmingham Bulls.

== Playing career ==
Webb was a former association football player who had become "bored and disillusioned" with the sport and answered a newspaper advert attempting to recruit players to the Birmingham Bulls.

At the start of his career, he was in direct competition with GB Lions kicker Richard Meanwell, who also played rugby for Moseley RFC, and had previously represented England at under-19 level. Webb was part of the 1986 Summer Bowl II winning side, but it was Meanwell who kicked a field goal in the final.

Despite thoughts of retirement, he returned for the 1988 season as the Bulls' lone placekicker, following the retirement of Meanwell and was part of another national championship winning side, but found himself on the losing side in 1989.

Webb cemented his place in Britball history in the 1991 NDMA Coke Bowl against the London Olympians by becoming the first kicker in British history to win a national championship with a field goal. Webb kicked a successful 23-yard field goal to put the Bulls ahead by a single point with 17 seconds left.

Following the departure of head coach Steve Moon in 1992, Webb retired from football altogether.

In 2008, Webb was inducted into the Birmingham Bulls Hall of Fame.

== International career ==
Following the 1991 title-winning season, Webb was called up to the GB Lions squad for the first time for the European Nations Championship in Finland by London Monarchs assistant coach and GB head coach Ray Willsey.

In the semi-final versus the Netherlands, Webb converted all seven of his extra-point attempts in a 49-3 victory. He also converted his two extra-point attempts in the final against Finland to maintain a 100% accuracy rate, on the way to a 14-3 victory over the hosts and favourites. Webb, along with several other Bulls, was selected to the All-Europe team.

== Coaching career ==
In 2013, Webb was appointed kicking and punting coach by incoming head coach Ian Hill, and was promoted to special teams co-ordinator by new head coach Mark Pagett in 2014, but stepped down part way through the season.

== Honours and records ==
- Birmingham Bulls Hall of Fame
- Alltime British Allstars
- 1991 All-Europe Team
- Most Field Goals and Most Extra Points in Birmingham Bulls History

== Statistics ==
=== Regular season ===
Season	Team	Games	Overall FGs			PATs			Points
Season	Team	GP	FG Att	FGM	Pct	XP Att	XPM	Pct	Points
1986	Birmingham Bulls	1	0	0	0	3	3	100	3
1987	Birmingham Bulls	10	6	1	16.6	21	14	66.7	7
1988	Birmingham Bulls	14	11	4	36.4	52	45	86.5	57
1989	Birmingham Bulls	10	3	2	66.7	29	21	72.4	27
1990	Birmingham Bulls	10	2	1	50.0	6	4	66.7	7
1991	Birmingham Bulls	10	7	4	57.1	57	50	87.7	62
1992	Birmingham Bulls	10	12	7	58.3	33	22	66.7	43
Total		65	41	19	46.3	201	159	79.1	196

=== Postseason ===
Season	Team	Games	Overall FGs			PATs			Points
Season	Team	GP	FG Att	FGM	Pct	XP Att	XPM	Pct	Points
1986	Birmingham Bulls	1	0	0	0	2	2	100	2
1988	Birmingham Bulls	3	2	1	50.0	12	10	83.3	13
1989	Birmingham Bulls	3	1	0	0.0	12	11	91.7	11
1990	Birmingham Bulls	2	0	0	0.0	3	2	66.7	2
1991	Birmingham Bulls	3	5	5	100.0	10	9	90.0	24
1992	Birmingham Bulls	2	4	2	50.0	4	4	100.0	10
Total		14	12	8	66.7	43	38	88.3	62

=== European competition ===
Season	Team	Games	Overall FGs			PATs			Points
Season	Team	GP	FG Att	FGM	Pct	XP Att	XPM	Pct	Points
1986	Birmingham Bulls	2	0	0	0	6	6	100.0	6
1989	Birmingham Bulls	2	2	2	100.0	3	2	66.7	8
1992	Birmingham Bulls	2	0	0	0	3	2	66.7	2
Total		6	2	2	100.0	12	10	83.3	16
