= Potential London NFL franchise =

Hypothetical American football team based in London

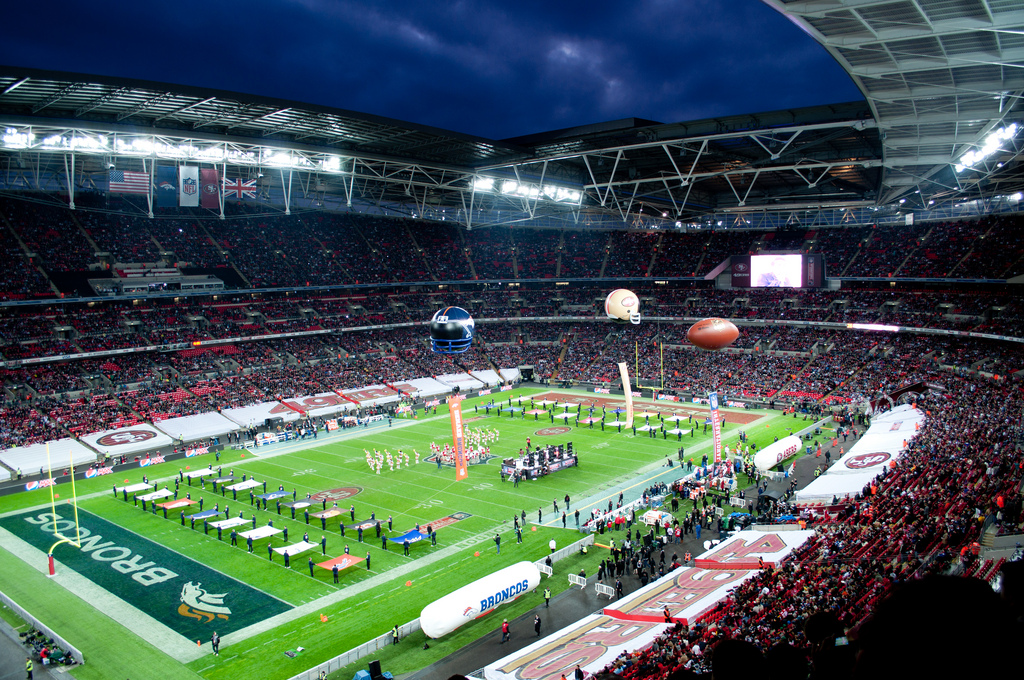
Opening ceremony at Wembley Stadium before the Denver Broncos vs. San Francisco 49ers game in the NFL International Series, 2010

A potential London NFL franchise is a hypothetical National Football League (NFL) American football team based in London, formed as a new expansion team or by relocating one of the existing 32 NFL teams currently based in the United States. Should the league establish a team in London, it would become the first of the major professional sports leagues in the United States and Canada to establish a franchise outside either of those two countries.

A London NFL franchise would be intended to grow the league's revenues and provide further access to the British and European markets. However, the agreement of league owners is needed to undertake an expansion or relocation, and a London franchise would face financial, legal and logistical challenges. Possible home stadiums for the London team include one or more of Wembley Stadium, Twickenham Stadium or Tottenham Hotspur Stadium.

Since 2007, the league has held multiple regular season games in London each season as part of the NFL International Series, allowing the league to test solutions to some of the challenges facing a hypothetical London franchise.

== Background ==
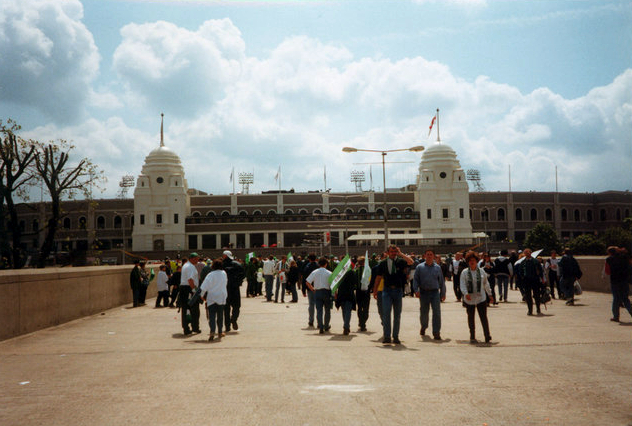
The original Wembley Stadium hosted NFL preseason games as part of the American Bowl from 1986 to 1993, and the London Monarchs during the 1991 and 1992 seasons of the World League of American Football, including World Bowl '91.

Although American football in the United Kingdom has historically been a niche sport, British interest in the NFL was piqued in 1982, when Channel 4 began to show game highlights, and London began to host preseason games, beginning with the American Bowl in 1986.

From 1991, the city hosted the London Monarchs in the league's developmental World League of American Football (WLAF), initially based out of the original Wembley Stadium, at which they won World Bowl '91 to become the inaugural champions. Following the 1992 season, the World League disbanded: however, after a restructuring that removed the North American teams, the League returned for 1995, and London gained a British rival with the creation of the Scottish Claymores, based at Murrayfield Stadium in Edinburgh. The Monarchs, meanwhile, left Wembley Stadium for reasons of cost, size and availability, and the team's home games were played at Tottenham Hotspur's White Hart Lane in the 1995 and 1996 seasons. White Hart Lane's field was only 93 yards long – nowhere near large enough to hold a full 120-yard field and end zones – so the WLAF had to grant an exemption from the usual rules. London left Tottenham one game early, playing their 1996 season closer at Chelsea's Stamford Bridge before moving there for the entirety of the 1997 WLAF season.

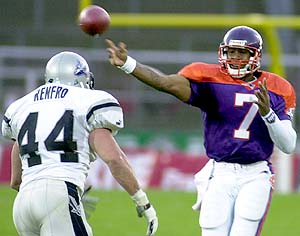
Scottish Claymores' Dusty Renfro (left) faces Frankfurt Galaxy's Michael Bishop in a 2001 NFL Europe game.

The WLAF became NFL Europe from the 1998 season, the year sweeping changes were brought to the UK teams. As the Monarchs rebranded to England Monarchs, playing at various venues across the country (Crystal Palace National Sports Centre in London, Bristol City's Ashton Gate and Alexander Stadium, an athletics stadium in Birmingham), the Scots' team began playing across not only Murrayfield but Hampden Park in Glasgow too. However, as all NFL Europe franchises outside Germany and the Netherlands, both British teams were ultimately relocated due to lack of public interest: Monarchs bound for Berlin for 1999, while the Claymores moved to Glasgow permanently from 2001 (save for one game in the 2002 season) before heading for Hamburg in 2004. The League would become NFL Europa for the final season in 2007.

Popular interest in the sport waned with the growth of the Association football Premier League in the 1990s, although it grew again from 2007 following the establishment of the International Series. It also led to steady increases in actual participation in amateur games.

== Mechanics ==
An affirmative vote of three-quarters of the owners of the NFL's 32 clubs is required before a new team can be created (known as expansion) or before an existing team is allowed to move to a new market (known as relocation), i.e. 24 or more clubs would have to approve of the decision.

According to The Guardian, as of 2015 it was "well-known" that a London franchise was a goal of NFL commissioner Roger Goodell, although "he tends to avoid specifics on the process to make that happen". The NFL's Executive Vice President International Mark Waller was more specific, expressing the goal as "to build a fanbase that would be able to support a franchise". According to Atlanta Falcons owner Arthur Blank speaking in 2014, "The approach that the international committee and the commissioner have taken is, 'Let's do London right, and then move from there to potentially somewhere else'."

=== Expansion franchise ===
In the opinion of former NFL executive Jim Bailey, the NFL would probably prefer to create a London-based franchise through the expansion route, since that would offer them more control over the process. According to CBS, however, as of 2012 the club owners were generally satisfied with the league's 32 team model, and would prefer a relocation. According to the Associated Press, the 32-team model is seen as advantageous as it offers "competitively balanced schedules and division alignments". CBS also argued that expansion teams generally struggle "for quite some time", suggesting a relocated team would be the better option from the standpoint of competitiveness.

Speaking in 2012, Goodell responded positively to the prospect of creating new teams through expansion "in the foreseeable future." At that time, it was speculated that the US market was saturated, and so it was unlikely that an expansion team within the US would generate the NFL's desired growth without a fundamental change in their funding model, such as the introduction of pay-per-view TV (which was also seen as unlikely since the league's existing broadcasting contracts ran to 2022).

=== Shared franchise ===
According to NFL.com, one possible way to achieve a London franchise in a way that overcomes the various issues facing a London operation, which has been considered by team owners and NFL executives, is the possibility of a shared franchise, with the team playing four home games in London and four in the US, although this was not considered ideal as it could potentially weaken the appeal given the split fanbase and ultimately not achieve critical mass, in addition it would be unlikely to be attractive to London fans if it were assumed in that scenario that any such team would always play its postseason games in its US base. Speaking in 2015, Waller stated "we've never had real discussions about a shared market".

=== Relocating a franchise ===
==== Jacksonville Jaguars ====
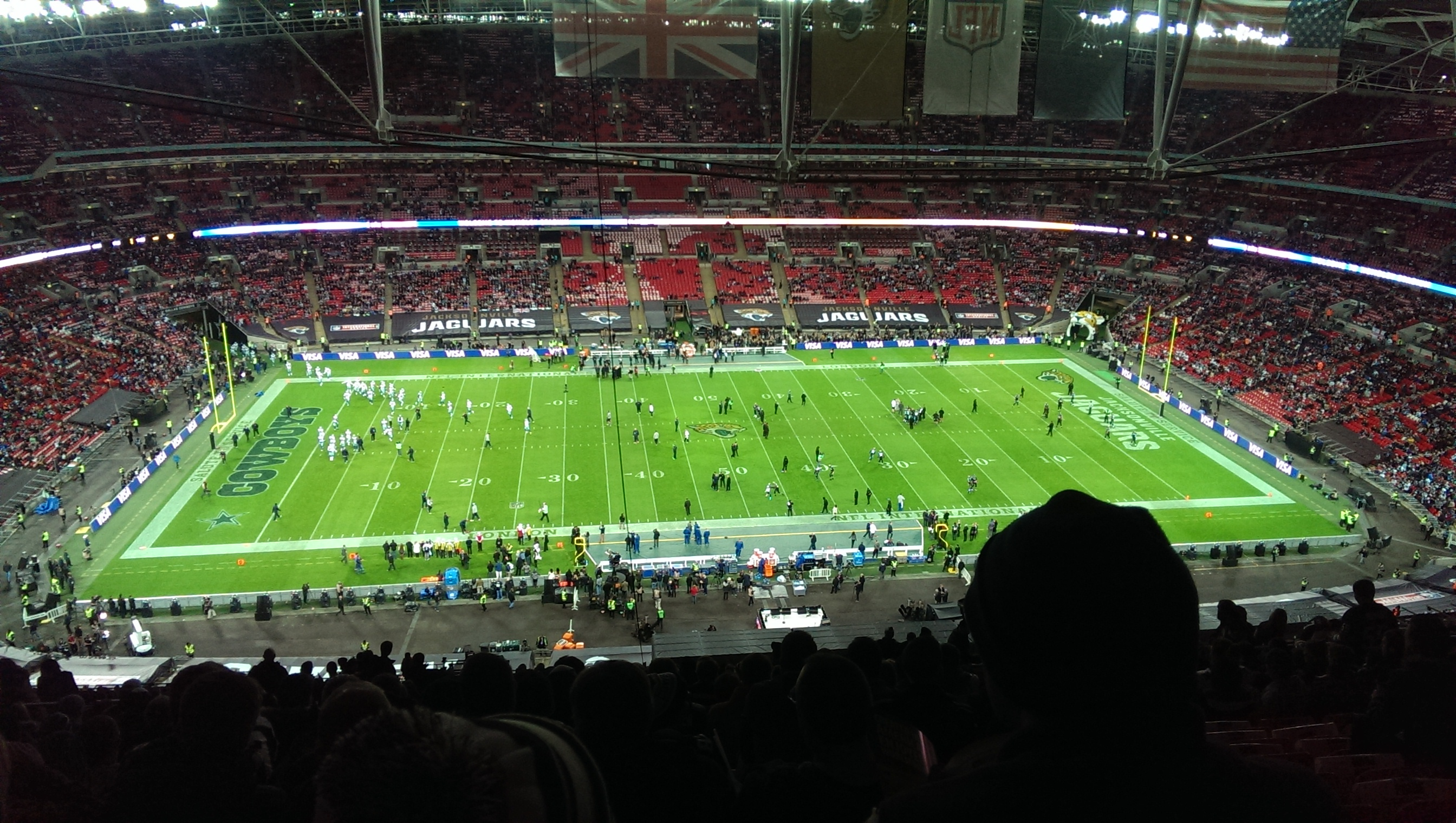
2014 NFL International Series game between Dallas Cowboys and Jacksonville Jaguars at Wembley

As the designated home team for the International Series, the Jacksonville Jaguars are often mentioned as the most likely existing NFL team to relocate to London, leaving their current home of EverBank Stadium in Florida. It is often pointed out in support that current Jaguars owner Shahid Khan is himself based in London, and also owns Fulham F.C. While Khan admits playing home games in London has been a success in terms of improving the finances and profile of what was a small and struggling franchise, he has nonetheless been reluctant to commit to a move, preferring the current arrangement. On March 27, 2017, it was reported by City A.M. that the Jaguars were in discussion to build a permanent training facility near Wembley Stadium. If done, the team would be the first NFL franchise to have a training facility built outside of the U.S. On April 26, 2018, it was reported that Khan had made an offer to The Football Association to buy Wembley Stadium, although he subsequently rescinded that offer.

==== Franchises with market knowledge ====
As well as the Jacksonville Jaguars, the fact that some other existing franchises have owners with knowledge of the British market due to also owning United Kingdom based sports teams, such as the Glazer family's ownership of the Tampa Bay Buccaneers based in Tampa, Florida and Manchester United leads to them being suggested as potential relocation candidates. Up until their move to Los Angeles was announced in January 2016, this also included the former St. Louis Rams owned by Arsenal F.C.'s majority shareholder, Stan Kroenke.

==== Franchises with short leases ====
The fact that the Jacksonville Jaguars have a short term lease on its stadium is also often used to support media speculation that the franchise may be the one to relocate to London. This was also the case for the former St. Louis Rams and San Diego Chargers until their respective moves to Los Angeles in 2016 and 2017 (even so, although the Rams own both teams' current home of SoFi Stadium and are almost certain to stay in Los Angeles for the long-term, the Chargers are leasing that stadium and have not yet established a fan base, leaving open the possibility for another relocation), and the former Oakland Raiders until relocation to Las Vegas was approved in 2017.

The Raiders, lacking a stadium for 2019, were said to have an "extreme long shot" at playing all of their home games in London that year, should all other options fail. Cost and logistics concerns made this scenario unlikely, and the Raiders ultimately decided to renew their agreement with the Oakland Coliseum after initially stating they would not do so.

==== Weaker franchises ====
As happened with the Buffalo Bills in 2014, even franchises with relatively long lease agreements but which are otherwise seen as struggling in their own market, are often named by the media as potential candidates for relocation to London, on the basis that those advocating relocation to a more lucrative market would be offering more money than those proposing to stay put. In the specific case of the Bills, it was however suggested that the NFL would oppose relocation since they were the only NFL team which played in New York state (the New York Jets and New York Giants being located in a shared stadium, the MetLife Stadium in New Jersey). The Bills constructed New Highmark Stadium, which ties the team to the Buffalo area for 30 years.

=== Multiple franchises ===
Given the size of London, it has been suggested by Atlanta Falcons owner Arthur Blank that there could ultimately be more than one franchise located in London, although not before a team in another European country.

During a press conference on October 8, 2022, the day before that year's second International Series game in London, Commissioner Goodell indicated that London – and all of Europe – could get at least two franchises and as much as a four-team division, saying: "There's no question that London could support not just one franchise, I think two franchises. We're trying to sort of see, could you have multiple locations in Europe where you could have an NFL franchise? Because it would be easier as a division."

== Potential stadiums ==
One potential advantage for London as a market for an NFL franchise is that all of the likely stadiums for the franchise have already been built, with two of them being built in the 21st century and having sufficient modern amenities to host such a team. This eliminates the expense, currently over $1 billion, of constructing a stadium for the team that meets NFL specifications.

=== Wembley Stadium ===
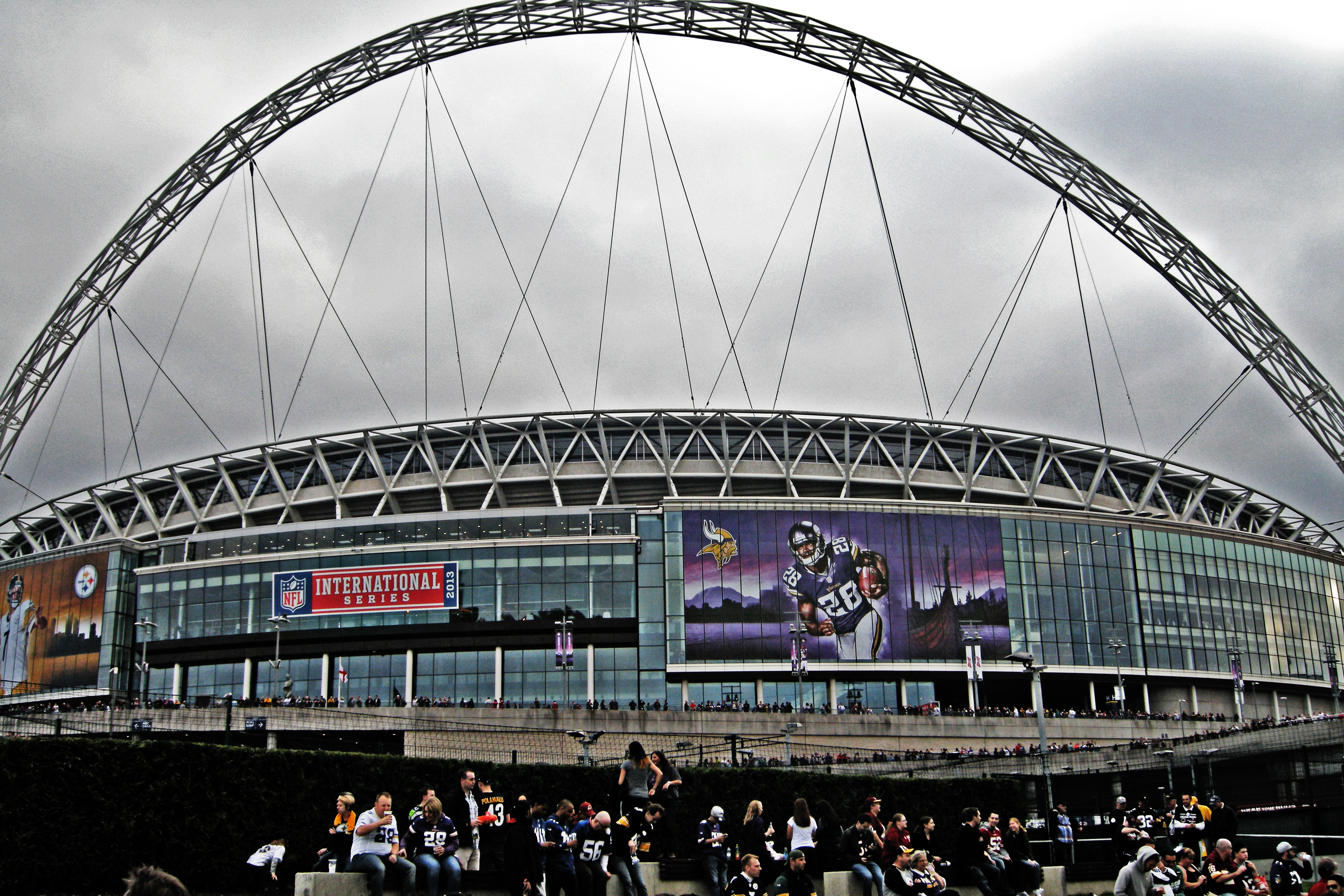
Wembley Stadium at the 2013 NFL International Series for the game between Pittsburgh Steelers and Minnesota Vikings.

Wembley Stadium, England's national association football stadium, was rebuilt and re-opened in 2007, and was the first venue for International Series games in that same year. It was built with locker rooms which are twice the size usually found in soccer venues, which allows them to accommodate a 53-man NFL roster.

Wembley hosted regular season games under agreements that extended its partnership through 2025. The stadium's owners, The Football Association, were reportedly interested in using Wembley as the base of a London team, but it was suggested by The Telegraph that they might struggle to accommodate a full programme of NFL games, as well as hosting the England national football team. Another potential issue is the natural grass pitch (following the first International Series game, the pitch was upgraded to a partly artificial Desso surface) – with previous England team manager Roy Hodgson having complained about the state of the surface after just two International Series games, claiming one player injured his ankle in 2014 because of the cut-up pitch. The issue of NFL markings still being partly visible during association football matches has also been criticized in the media.

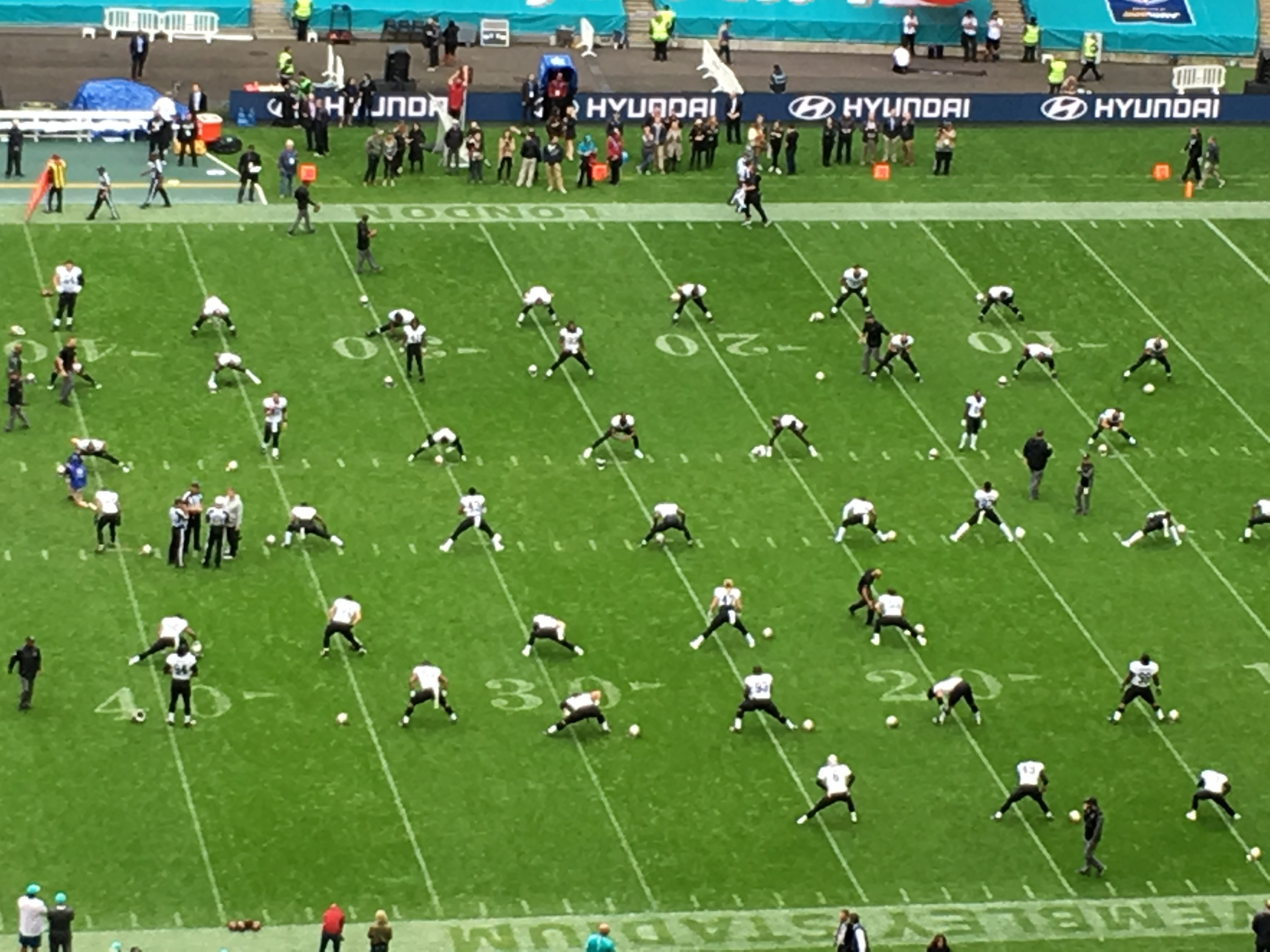
New Orleans Saints warm up on the Wembley pitch, complete with NFL markings, in 2017. Roy Hodgson, the England manager, complained of cut-up grass during the 2014 Series, while NFL markings still being visible during England's match with San Marino provoked negative media comment.

To test the implications of a full season at Wembley, the NFL scheduled two International Series games over two weekends, followed by an England association football game, to see how the surface copes. Wembley earns an estimated £500,000 to £1 million per NFL game in profit; due to the debt incurred in building it, the BBC commented that maximizing the number of other events staged at Wembley is vital to the FA's financial health, believing the benefit of the consistent revenue stream of 8 NFL games a year would not escape their attention. Although mindful of the calendar, according to the stadium's managing director speaking in 2013, "Football is our priority but yes, I'm absolutely confident that if Roger Goodell wanted to have a franchise here, we could absolutely deliver on it."

One possible method of accommodating the full schedule of an NFL franchise that the FA is investigating (as of 2014), is playing some home England games at other football stadiums around the country, something which had not been done since the stadium had been reopened. A 10-year restriction on having to play all home games at Wembley expired in 2017, although Wembley remains the regular home of the team. Supporting the idea, the BBC contrasted the low attendances of some England football friendlies at Wembley, which reached a record low of 40,181 in 2014, surpassing the previous record of 48,876 in 2011, with the 80,000 crowds for the 2014 three game International Series. The England team was taken back on tour in pre-tournament friendlies for UEFA Euro 2016, with Turkey scheduled at the City of Manchester Stadium on May 22, 2016, before facing Australia on May 27, 2016, at the Stadium of Light in Sunderland; sporadic international games have been taken to the regions in the years since, including a competitive match (a UEFA Euro 2020 qualifying match against Kosovo was held at St Mary's Stadium in Southampton in 2019).

In April 2018, Jaguars owner Shahid Khan placed a bid on Wembley Stadium in an effort to solidify the Jaguars' presence in the city; this offer was retracted in October 2018.

=== Tottenham Hotspur Stadium ===
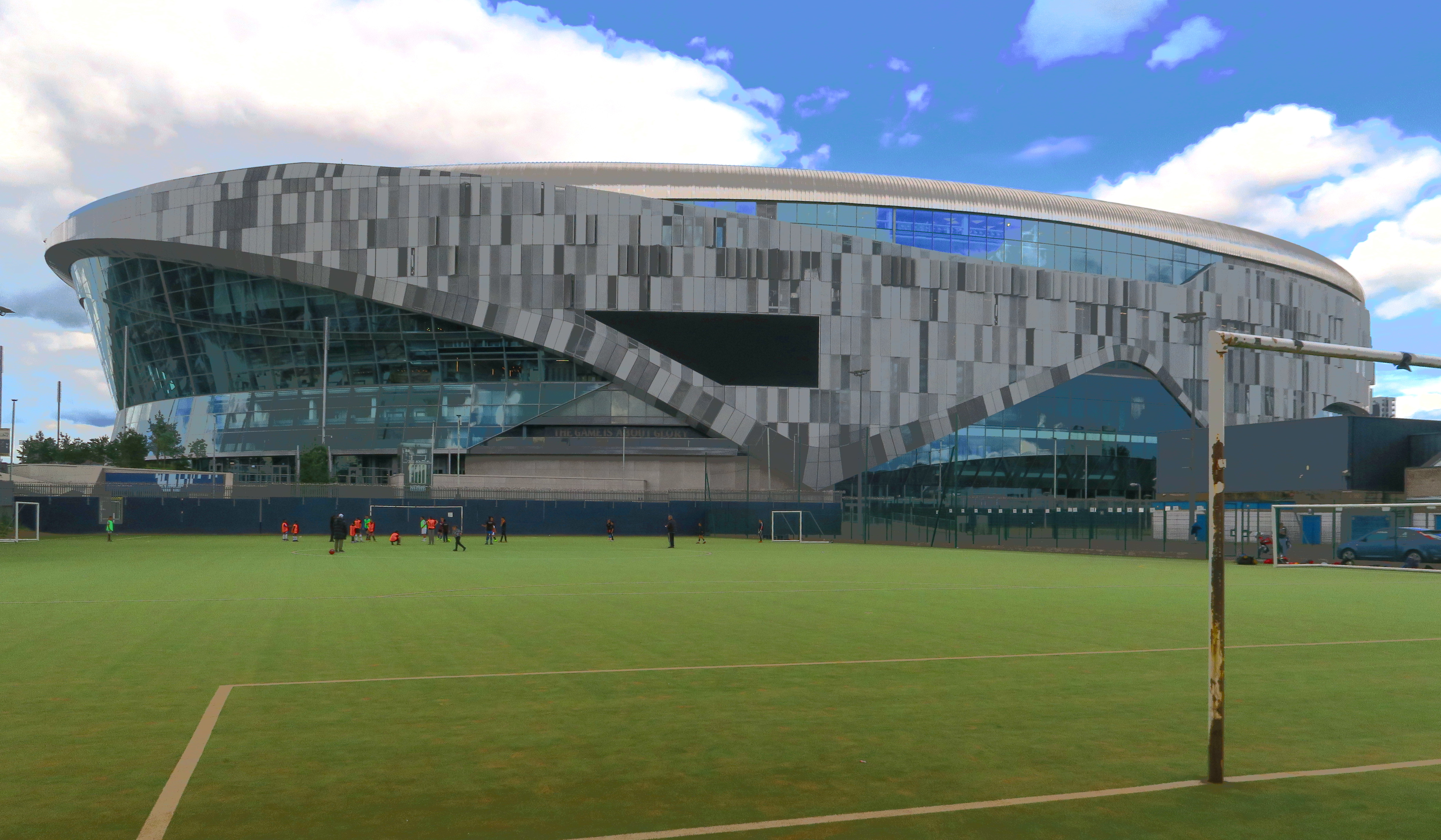
Tottenham Hotspur Stadium (2019 image) was built from the ground up for both football codes, and bears two playing surfaces: a retractable grass football pitch above artificial turf.

On July 8, 2015, it was announced that the NFL had agreed to stage a minimum of two games a season for a ten-year period at Tottenham Hotspur's new stadium in Northumberland Park, which opened nearly a year behind schedule in 2019. This was interpreted as boosting the chances of an eventual London franchise. As a result of the deal, the stadium was specifically designed for both American and association versions of football. It has a retractable natural grass pitch over an artificial surface used for NFL games (which should allow both soccer and NFL games to be played on the same weekend), and with locker rooms of sufficient size to accommodate the 53-man size of an NFL team roster. Its proposed capacity of 61,000 was described a being more appropriate for the day-to-day requirements of an NFL franchise than Wembley's 84,000. It has been suggested the design will also eliminate the issue at Wembley whereby the lowest 5,000 seats cannot be used because spectator views of the pitch are obstructed by the various officials, coaches and players who stand on the sidelines during an NFL game. The architect, Populous, had previously designed 14 NFL stadiums.

=== Twickenham Stadium ===
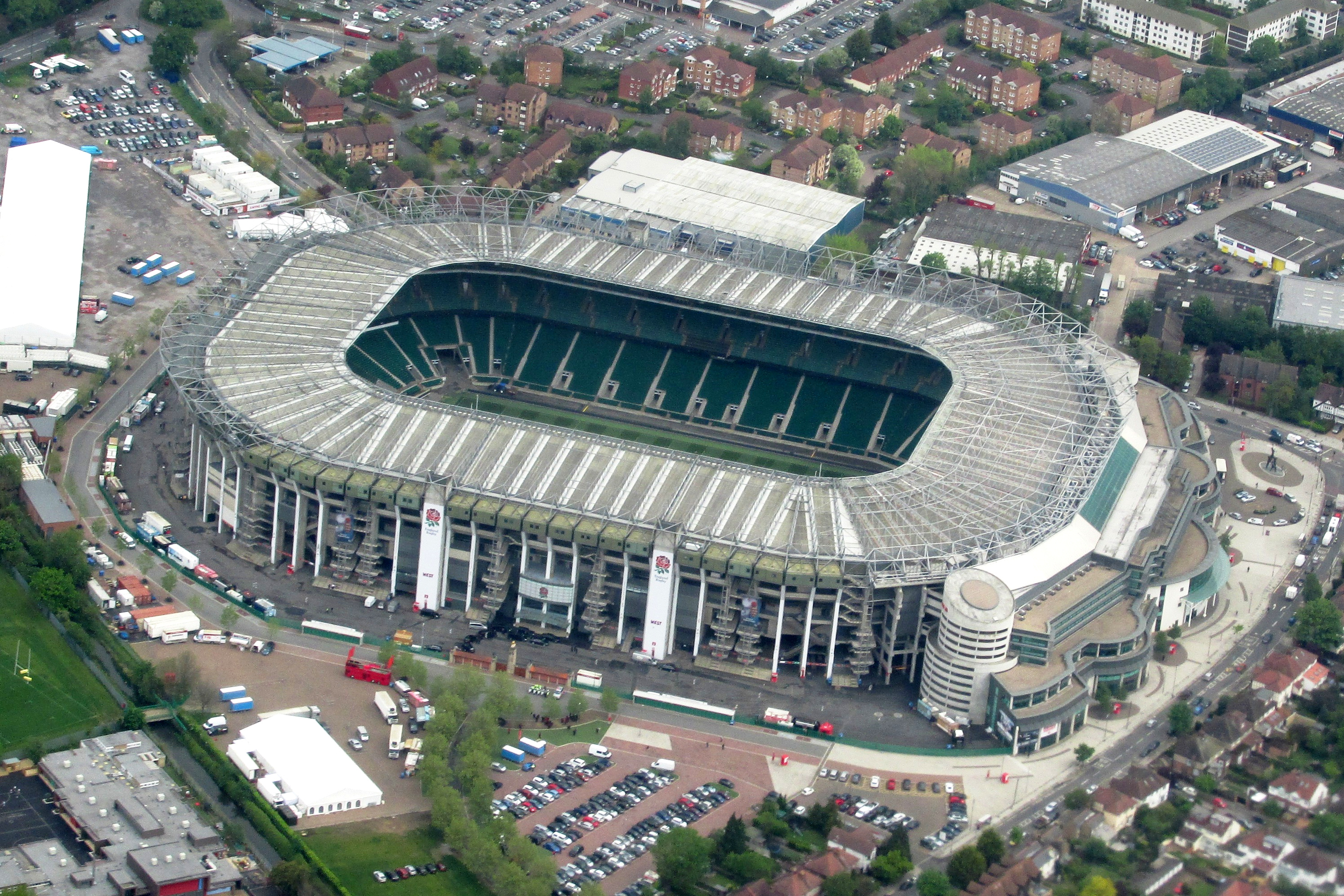
Twickenham Stadium hosted three NFL International Series games.

On November 3, 2015, the NFL also announced it had reached a deal with the Rugby Football Union to host a minimum of three games in three years at Twickenham Stadium, beginning from the 2016 International Series. The deal is designed to be flexible, i.e. it could involve two games in one year and none the next. The deal also includes an option to add two more games in the same period. The three-game commitment was fulfilled in two years. All three games were held in October, as the venue is home of the England national rugby team during the November test matches.

=== Multiple stadiums ===
To resolve some of the issues, it has also been suggested a London franchise may use more than one of the suggested venues as their home stadium.

== Issues ==
A number of issues need to be resolved before a London franchise can be set up; speaking in 2015 Waller stated "We feel very comfortable from a fan perspective, from a sponsor and a stadium perspective now, that we have all of the right things in place. The one thing that we’ve got to do more work on is how would it work from a team operational standpoint?"

=== Logistics ===
Speaking after talks with the UK government, Dan Marino argued that probably the biggest challenge facing a London franchise is the physical logistics of moving the staff and equipment across the Atlantic for every away game. To overcome this, he speculated that the NFL might follow the example of other sports like basketball and baseball, where some teams play away games in back to back series of three or four games, allowing the team to stay in the US for this part of their schedule. It has been noted that this approach may be problematic as it requires players to spend multiple weeks at a time away from home (whether home is in the US or London), something they would not have to do in a US based franchise. The NFL's use of a salary cap would also make using financial incentives to overcome this problematic. For the 2018 season, the league aimed for one of the teams to play back-to-back games in London.

=== Off-season and training camp ===
As well as the issue of a home stadium facility, the league has also been considering where a London franchise would hold their training camp, which begins in late July and normally involves several players not yet formally signed to the club. Similarly, another issue is whether or not it would have a base in the US for the off-season period, the gap between whenever their season ends until the start of the following training camp, in which the club will normally hold several meetings regarding staff and player contracts.

As of 2014 the NFL had investigated the possibility of a London team establishing a permanent base in conjunction with a Premier League club, but it was considered unlikely for reasons of infrastructure and scheduling. The league has also considered establishing a secondary base, probably in the Southeastern United States, for the London club to use for circumstances when returning to London is impractical.

=== Fanbase ===
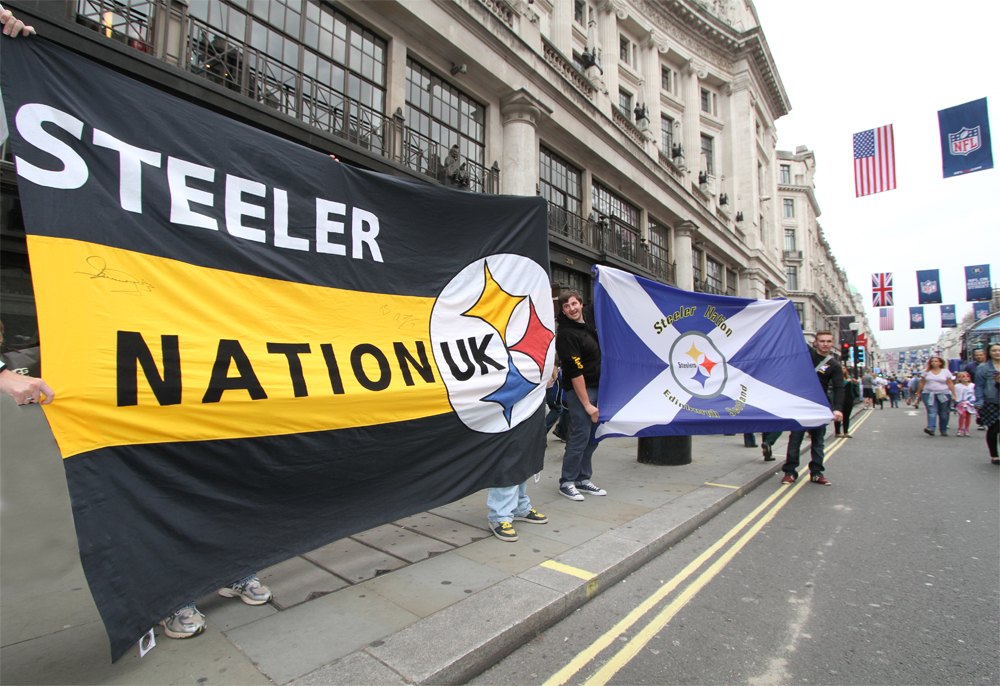
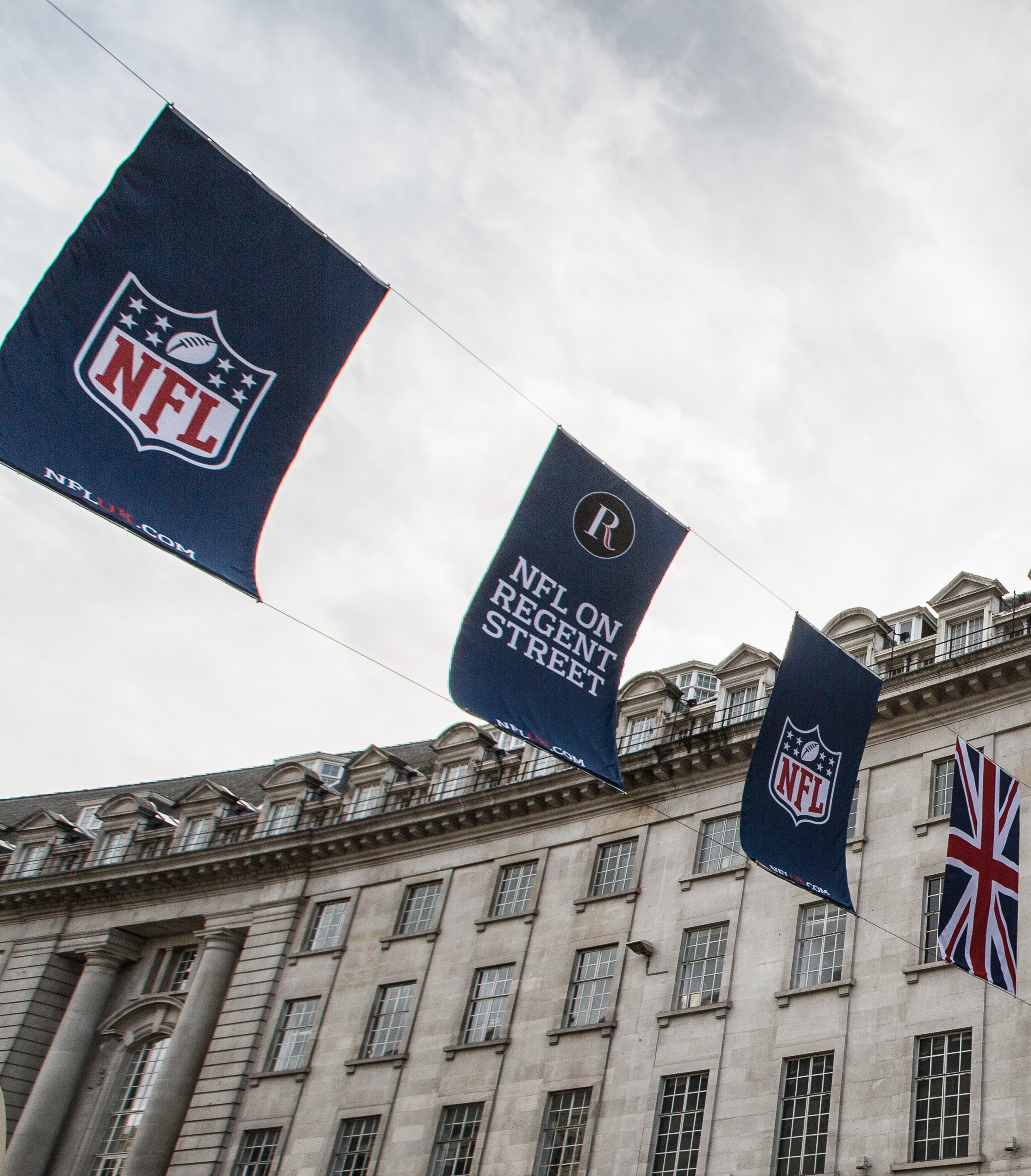
Two Steelers' supporters groups from the UK meet at a 2013 NFL rally on Regent Street in London's West End

The NFL set a target of reaching a total of 6 million "avid fans" in the UK before considering a London franchise viable, surveying the UK annually to assess this figure; an avid fan being defined by the NFL as someone who says they're "extremely interested" in the NFL or that it is their favorite sport. Speaking during the 2015 International Series, Waller stated "We're currently at 4 million, we were at about 2.3 million when the International Series started [in 2007]. We’re on track to reach that 6 million target by 2020." Speaking at the start of 2016, he said "The fan base is big enough and passionate enough that it can support a franchise".

It has been suggested that a significant stumbling block to creating the necessary fanbase is ironically the success of the NFL in promoting itself in the UK in the past. Many fans had been drawn into the NFL when the game was popularized in the 1980s, leading to evidence of support for all of the NFL's 32 teams in UK based fans, many of whom would be unlikely to support a London team as a first resort, i.e. being unlikely to consider them anything other than their favorite second team at best, and a potential rival at worst. As a result, while wishing to retain the support of anyone for a London team on a second favorite basis, the NFL's UK operation has been focussing on growing the fan base by reaching out to younger fans without an established allegiance, and others who are entirely new to the sport. The NFL's UK operation has pointed to the success of the 1995 expansion team the Carolina Panthers having grown a fanbase in a previously untapped market to support the idea that a London team could do the same.

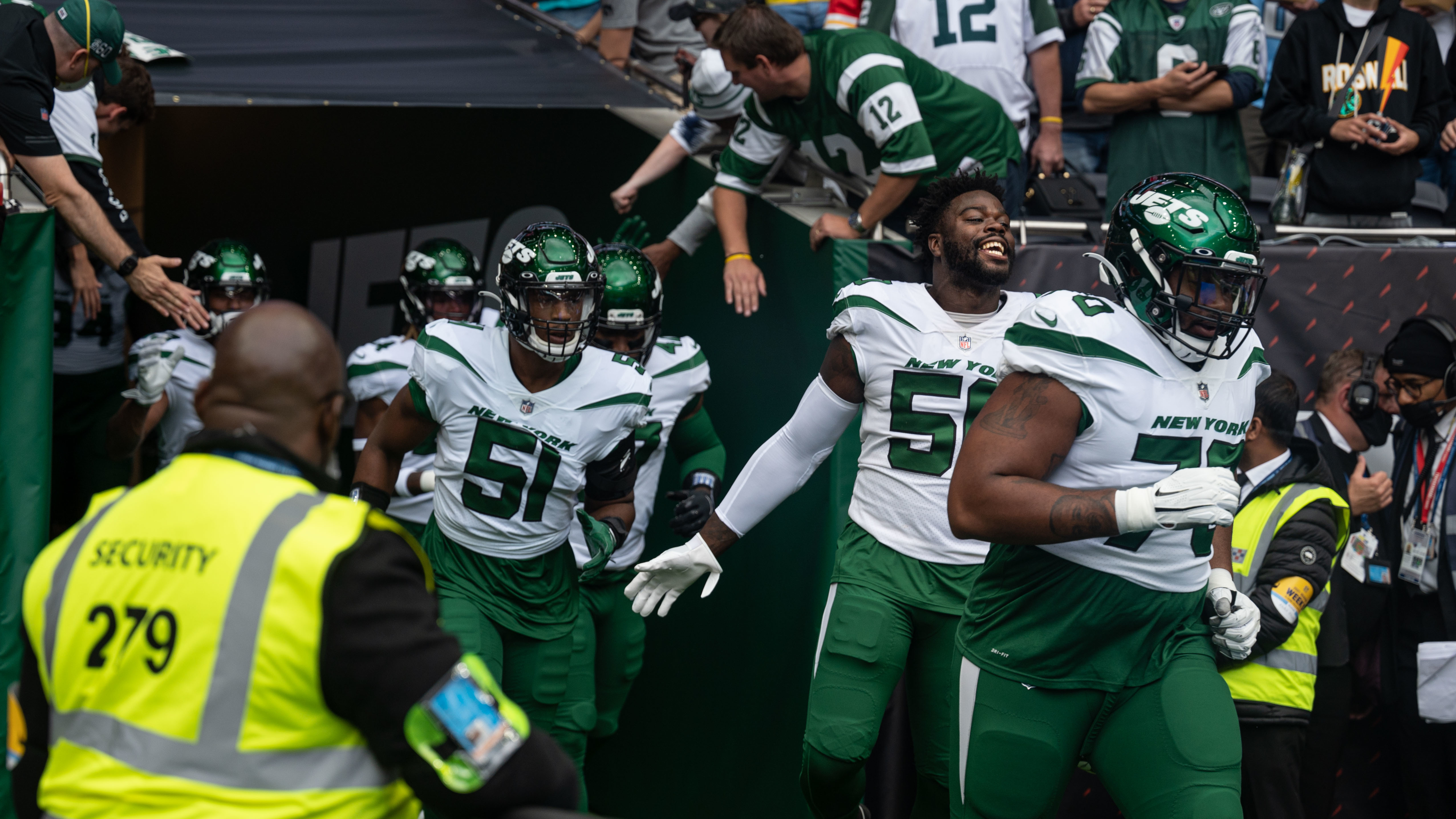
The New York Jets enter the field at the 2021 NFL London Games game against Atlanta Falcons at Tottenham Hotspur Stadium

In an attempt to gauge support for a London team, from the 2015 season the dates and times of the International Series games were adjusted to make them more closely resemble the home games of a London team, as opposed to casting them as one off special events being timed in a fashion more convenient for a US audience.

As of the 2014 International Series, 9 out of 10 tickets for the games were bought by people who lived within three hours' travel of London, with 33,000 people choosing to buy a package ticket for all three games. That number had risen to 40,000 repeat customers for the four-game package in 2017.

The league has been encouraged by the fact that the International Series games were still attracting over 80,000 fans for a game like the Detroit Lions versus the Kansas City Chiefs on October 31, 2015, the teams which had the 24th and 31st best records in the NFL at game time, leading The Telegraph to observe that Middlesbrough vs Brentford would be the equivalent English soccer game on the day (based on their positions in the Football League Championship).

=== League schedule ===
The NFL and others have also recognized that the current arrangement of giving all teams that play an International Series game the following week off (a bye week) as being impractical if a London franchise was created, leading to the need to either change the schedule, or persuade teams to play UK and US games in adjacent weeks. The arrangement practiced by the University of Hawaii football team, separated from the U.S. mainland by about 3,900 kilometres (2,400 mi), has been suggested as the model to follow for playing blocks of two to three games, home and away.

While still retaining the bye-week, as a test of the logistics, the first game of the 2015 International Series was the first time teams only traveled to London for the weekend, having previously spent a whole week in the UK.

=== Competitiveness ===
==== With other NFL teams ====
The NFL is mindful of avoiding the perception that any potential London franchise was being established simply to increase the profile and revenue of the league; any team based in London must be competitive and be able to win the Super Bowl.

The scheduling of the first back-to-back weekend games in the 2015 International Series was also a test of a potential London franchise on competitiveness. One potential issue affecting competition that has been identified (by an NFL team owner) is what happens should a London franchise reach the post-season, which could possibly involve a long trip for a west coast based team to London, and then back to the US for the next weekend. In addition to the travel, it is believed this also presents a challenge in terms of potentially leaving away teams only a week to plan a foreign trip (in contrast to teams knowing the regular season schedule months in advance).

While the International Series games have tested the effect on personnel of traveling east from the USA to the UK and then playing a game within a few days, because of the bye week it has yet to be established what the effect is when traveling the other way. It has been suggested this may be tested by scheduling one team to play back-to-back weekends in the International Series (as the notional home and away team).

Another issue considered is whether or not a London team would have an unfair competitive advantage compared to US-based teams, due to the extra distances away teams would have to travel to play them.

==== With the BAFA ====
The United Kingdom has its own national league for American football, the BAFA National Leagues (BAFANL), which is run by the British American Football Association (BAFA). The BAFA National League is organized on an "open pyramid" system of promotion and relegation, similarly to European association football and basketball leagues; it has five London-based teams, two of which are in the BAFANL premier division. The creation of a London-based NFL franchise would create a situation where a sports team plays outside the league pyramid of the country it is based in, an unprecedented situation in European sports. Similar concerns about the creation of a "closed league" of top-level teams separate from the European league pyramids led to the failure of the European Super League in association football.

=== Tax ===
As of 2013, players appearing in International Series games were subject to UK tax on their income and endorsements on a pro rata basis. If expanded to a full slate of regular season games, it has been suggested that unless the government granted exemptions to attract the NFL, which have been applied to some but not all sports/athletes, then the difference between the UK and US tax codes would have the effect of making the after-tax value of a player contract considerably less when signed by a UK-based team compared to a similar contract with a US-based team. Thus, if a London-based team was subjected to the same salary cap, it would difficult for the team to sign enough top-caliber free agents to make it a Super Bowl contender. The talks between the Chancellor and the NFL from 2014 onwards were interpreted by the media as a willingness to offer support in the form of promises of tax exemptions.

=== Visas ===
As of 2013, players appearing in International Series games were admitted on temporary working visas, a situation which would not be possible for players working a full home schedule, which would require visas to be issued by a UK government recognised governing body for the sport. Although the UK has a national governing body for the game, the British American Football Association (BAFA), it is not recognised by the UK government for visa purposes; in addition, the BAFA organizes its own National Leagues, which has five London-based teams. In order to clear these obstacles, it has been suggested the NFL would either have to create its own governing body in the UK, or work through BAFA after they gain approval. Although not expected to fail, it has been speculated that approval of the governing body could be conditional on restrictions being placed on the activities of the NFL in the UK that would not apply to the NFL's US teams, depending on the government's view of how the visas benefit sport in the country. Analogies have been drawn to soccer, where players from outside the European Union (which the UK was formerly part of) must be shown to be bringing something "special and different", and teams are required to comprise a minimum number of EU citizens. Individual visas may still also be denied due to issues such as criminal convictions.

=== European Union law ===
As a former member of the European Union (EU), much of the UK's laws are based on EU law. It has been suggested that the NFL's use of a draft system and a minimum age limit on players would come into conflict with the EU's laws regarding freedom of movement for workers and competition. Citing sports lawyer Andrew Nixon, ESPN suggested in 2013 that while the draft may be permissible for the same reasons it is in the US, the age restriction had no US analogy, and so how it would be interpreted by the European Commission would be difficult to predict. The impact of the Bosman ruling on players' contracts is also unclear. It also argued that while the UK government would have more interest in making adjustments to accommodate a London team, the EU as a whole would have less to gain by adjusting its laws. A suggested workaround of the team being based in the US and simply flying in for games, Nixon said this was "not something that has been done before and it is untested".

On June 23, 2016, the UK voted to leave the EU and on January 31, 2020, the UK formally left the EU although it remained in the European Union Customs Union and European Single Market until the end of 2020. A spokesperson for the NFL said that it was working closely with its UK offices and "monitoring" the situation closely. Nonetheless, some NFL owners were on alert for whether the UK would go into a recession following an exit from the EU.

=== Collective bargaining agreement ===
Many aspects of NFL players' benefits and conditions are set down by the National Football League collective bargaining agreement, negotiated by the National Football League Players Association (NFLPA), which could potentially impact the establishment of a London franchise. Last negotiated in 2020, the current version runs until the 2030 season.

Speaking in September 2014, George Atallah, the NFLPA assistant executive director of external affairs, said of the issue that "A permanent team in London would require collective bargaining between the league and the players’ union and the NFL have not got to the point where they have said we want to raise it." and "Most players enjoy the experience of going over to London and from our perspective a team based in the UK could be viable – but only if the working conditions and health and safety aspects are satisfactory". This followed a 2013 comment that "Expanding to London by definition is a change in working conditions, placing the conversation squarely in the context of collective bargaining".

NBC Sports has speculated that "It's possible that the NFLPA simply will never agree to a London move. If they realize that any of them could be traded to the London team, or could have a London-based team as their only option for ongoing NFL employment via free agency, keeping a team out of London would keep that from ever happening."

== See also ==
- List of NFL games played outside the United States
