= American football in the United Kingdom =

Overview of sport in UK

The sport of American football is played in the United Kingdom in domestic and international levels. Domestic games in England. Scotland and Wales are operated by British American Football Association who run the BAFA National Leagues for Adult Contact football and British Universities American Football League for the University contact game. Games in Northern Ireland are structured by American Football Ireland who are based in the Republic of Ireland. The UK has played host to games in association with the Americans' National Football League (NFL), including four regular-season NFL games, as of 2021.

== History ==
=== Early years ===
The first game of organised American football to be played in the UK was scheduled to be between US Navy servicemen from the USS Idaho on 23 November 1910, in a match sponsored by the Daily Mirror known as the Silver Cup. However, after the Michigan team pulled out, they were replaced by a team from the USS Vermont. The game, played at Crystal Palace, finished 19–0 to the team of the Idaho. The cup was played for two more times in 1910, won once more by the crew of the Idaho, and once by the crew of the USS Georgia.

During World War II, large numbers of US servicemen stationed in Europe meant that games were regularly played in the United Kingdom. The most prominent game was known as the "Tea Bowl", played at the White City Stadium, between US and Canadian troops. The game, watched by 30,000 spectators, saw the first half played under US rules, and the second under Canadian rules. Canada came out as 16–6 victors, including a 40-yard touchdown reception for Denis Whitaker. A rematch was hastily planned, known as the "Coffee Bowl", and thanks to Philadelphia Eagles quarterback Tommy Thompson, 50,000 spectators watched the US team cruise to a 18–0 victory. Thanks to the success of the Tea and Coffee Bowl games, a game between the US Army and US Navy was scheduled for 12 November 1944. The match finished 20–0 in favour of the US Army.

Following the war, US forces stationed around Europe formed the USAFE League. The league ran from 1946 until being disbanded in 1993.

=== 1980s: Surge in popularity and foundation of a league system ===
In 1982, terrestrial broadcaster Channel 4 began showing weekly NFL highlights, and interest in the sport surged, assisted by the problems association football was facing at the time such as hooliganism and decaying stadiums. An estimated 4 million people tuned into Super Bowl XX between the Chicago Bears and the New England Patriots.

It was around this time that interest in a domestic British league started, and teams were founded primarily in proximity to Air Force bases with a strong American presence, such as RAF Croughton in Northamptonshire. In 1983, the first game between two British teams, the London Ravens and the Northwich Spartans, ended in a 48–0 victory to the Ravens.

In February 1984, a meeting at the Post House Hotel in Bedford saw representatives of 35 teams meet to discuss the formation of an association. 26 teams attended a second meeting, and this saw the formation of two leagues – the British American Football Federation (BAFF) and the American Football League United Kingdom (AFLUK) – and soon there would be over 40 teams competing in fully kitted football. However, in part due to the recession, players and teams struggled for funding.

In 1985, a further conference was scheduled with the aim of merging the existing organisations. However, the two leagues were unable to resolve their differences, and a third league, the United Kingdom American Football Association, was born from the meeting in Birmingham.

Villa Park was the site of the first British championship, between the Streatham Olympians and the London Ravens. 7,000 fans watched the London Ravens become the first British champions. It was in 1985 that the GB Lions played their first ever international game against France, coming away with a 7–0 victory.

Following a study of feasibility, Budweiser announced a £300,000 fund to grow the sport in the UK. In 1986, the Leicester Falcons and the Birmingham Bulls played to determine which team would be Britain's inaugural entry into European competition. The Bulls came out on top in a 32–18 victory.

In the same year, the two leagues would become one after BAFL announced massive losses and began immediate liquidation. 102 teams in 18 divisions found themselves under the Budweiser banner for the coming season. 1986 also saw the first ever official NFL game at Wembley between the Chicago Bears and the Dallas Cowboys.

The late 1980s saw a high number of import players brought in from the US. 1989 was also a mixed year for Britball. The GB Lions saw success, winning their first European Championship, but in the national leagues, Budweiser announced the withdrawal of their sponsorship.

=== 1990s ===
In 1990, the NFL established the NFL Trust, designed to develop the game further. 1990 also saw the NDMA league announce a sponsorship deal with Coca-Cola. 1991 saw the foundation of the World League of American Football, and the UK-based London Monarchs took home the inaugural World Bowl. In the same year, the GB Lions once again won the European Championship.

In 1992, following a demotion to the NDMA Division 2, the pioneering London Ravens folded. The WLAF was suspended until 1995, but returned with the Scottish Claymores representing the UK alongside the Monarchs.

In 1998, the British American Football League (BAFL) was founded to govern the game at a national level. After years of struggling, the team then known as the England Monarchs were replaced in NFL Europe by the Berlin Thunder.

=== New millennium ===
In 2005, the last remaining British-based team in NFL Europe, the Scottish Claymores, were replaced by the Hamburg Sea Devils.

Following the collapse of BAFL in 2010, the British American Football Association (BAFA) was founded to govern the National Leagues and the national team.

== Domestic leagues ==
In England, Scotland and Wales, the domestic game is organised by the British American Football Association (BAFA), who operate a series of league competitions as the BAFA National Leagues. The championship game is known as the BritBowl.

Northern Irish teams compete in an amateur island-wide regional competition in Ireland, organised by the Irish American Football League (IAFL).

American football is also one of the sports organised under the umbrella of the British Universities and Colleges Sport, which operates a league competition as the British Universities American Football League.

== International teams ==
The Great Britain national American football team represents the United Kingdom in international competition. There are a number of teams under the GB Lions banner; the Men's Senior team, the Students team, the U-19 team, the women's team and men's, women's and U-19 flag football teams.

== National Football League ==
Various games of the National Football League (NFL), the main professional league for the sport in the United States, have been played in the United Kingdom.

=== American Bowl ===
The American Bowl was an NFL pre-season competition held from 1986 until 2005 in various locations around the world. The original Wembley Stadium in London hosted a total of 8 of these games in the 8 seasons from 1986 until 1993, originally being the only venue for the first three years in which the Bowl consisted of only one game, and then as one of the multiple venues as it expanded incrementally from two, three and four games.

=== Development league teams ===
Two British teams competed in the NFL sanctioned development league, set up in 1991 as the World League of American Football (pausing in 1993–94), renamed NFL Europe in 1998, before eventually being disbanded in 2007. The London Monarchs competed from 1991 until 1998 (renamed England Monarchs in for their final season). The Scottish Claymores competed from 1995 to 2004.

=== International Series ===
The NFL International Series was inaugurated in 2007 to host NFL regular season games outside the United States. Played at the new Wembley Stadium in London (rebuilt and reopened in 2007), the series increased from one to two games for the 2013 season, to three games for the 2014 season, and then to four games from the 2017 season. In 2019, the series moved to the new home of Tottenham Hotspur, although games may still be played at Wembley Stadium.

=== Potential London franchise ===
The success of the International Series has led to speculation that London will be chosen as home of an NFL franchise in the future.

== Broadcasting ==
Channel 4 was the first British channel to broadcast American football, in 1982. Coverage of the 1982 season involved broadcasting highlights of one game a week, and culminated in the first ever live broadcast of the Super Bowl in Britain, for which Channel 4 paid NBC £100,000. The sport became so popular in the mid-1980s that the Super Bowl regularly attracted more than 4 million viewers.

Channel 4 ceased coverage of NFL in 1997, before returning in 2010. In terms of free-to-air television, the Channel 4 deal to show 21 games of the 2014 NFL season live (17 regular season games, the three International Series games, and the Super Bowl) marked a high point in terms of number of game shown. Channel 4 opted not to renew its rights from the 2015 season after failing to reach a deal with the NFL.

Since the 2020/21 season, Sky Sports had broadcast Sky Sports NFL. The channel is a full time service and runs for the duration of the NFL season. As well as live and recorded coverage of games, output includes simulcasts of magazine shows from NFL Network such as Good Morning Football and NFL Total Access. The channel broadcasts until early February 2021. This has been repeated in subsequent years.

Sky had first shown NFL coverage in 1995 and over the years Sky had gradually built up its rights after entering the market in 1995 and by 2015, Sky Sports coverage comprised 103 live games, including Thursday Night Football, Sunday Night Football and Monday Night Football, plus two or three other daytime Sunday games, as well as the full post-season and the Super Bowl.

Free-to-air coverage is currently seen on ITV which took over the terrestrial coverage of the sport after seven years on the BBC. The deal includes the rights to show two of the three NFL London Games and the Super Bowl in addition to a weekly highlights programme.

Other channels which have previously broadcast NFL games in the UK have been Channel 5, ESPN UK and British Eurosport.
