= Bob Shoop =

American football player and coach (born 1966)

Current position
- Title: Senior defensive analyst
- Team: Vanderbilt
- Conference: SEC

Biographical details
- Born: August 18, 1966 (age 60); Oakmont, Pennsylvania, U.S.

Playing career
- 1985–1987: Yale
- 1988–1989: Birmingham Bulls
- Position: Wide receiver

Coaching career (HC unless noted)
- 1989: Yale (GA)
- 1990: Virginia (GA)
- 1991–1993: Northeastern (DB)
- 1994–1996: Yale (DC)
- 1997: Villanova (DC)
- 1998: Army (DB)
- 1999–2002: Boston College (DB)
- 2003–2005: Columbia
- 2006: UMass (DB)
- 2007–2010: William & Mary (DC/DB)
- 2011–2013: Vanderbilt (DC/S)
- 2014–2015: Penn State (DC/S)
- 2016–2017: Tennessee (DC)
- 2018–2019: Mississippi State (DC/S)
- 2020: Michigan (S)
- 2021: Miami (FL) (DA)
- 2022: South Florida (DC/S)
- 2023: Birmingham Stallions (DB)
- 2024: Marshall (S)
- 2025–present: Vanderbilt (senior defensive analyst)

Head coaching record
- Overall: 7–23

Bob Shoop (born August 18, 1966) is an American football coach who is currently a senior defensive analyst at Vanderbilt. He served as the defensive coordinator there from 2011 to 2013, also having served as defensive coordinator at Mississippi State, Tennessee, and Penn State. Shoop served as the head football coach at Columbia University from 2003 to 2005.

Shoop played for Yale and professionally in the British League BAFA National Leagues in 1988 and 1989.

== Playing career ==
Shoop is a 1988 graduate of Yale University and both played and coached under Carmen Cozza. In his senior year, he was an honorable mention selection to the 1987 All-Ivy League team.

In 1988, and the early part of 1989, Shoop played professionally in the United Kingdom for the Birmingham Bulls.

Shoop pitched for the Yale Bulldogs baseball team. He earned four varsity letters and twice won the Raymond W. "Ducky" Pond Pitching Award for outstanding pitching.

== Coaching career ==
He served as an assistant coach at Yale and as defensive coordinator from 1994 to 1996. He was hired by Tom O'Brien at Boston College in 1999.

In 2003, Shoop was hired by Columbia University with the hopes that he would turn around the struggling program. He was fired shortly after the end of the 2005 with a record of 7–23 in his three seasons with the team. His 2005 team went winless in the Ivy League and he never finished above 6th place.

From 2007 to 2010, Shoop served as the defensive coordinator at William & Mary. On January 31, 2011, he was named as the defensive coordinator for the Vanderbilt Commodores, under new head coach James Franklin. He followed Franklin to Penn State to be in the same capacity for the beginning of the 2014 season.

On January 9, 2016, Shoop was announced as the defensive coordinator for the Tennessee Volunteers.

On December 10, 2017, Shoop was announced as the defensive coordinator for Mississippi State.

On January 20, 2020, Shoop was named the new safeties coach for Michigan.

On January 30, 2021, Shoop was hired by Miami to serve as an off-field defensive analyst.

On December 6, 2021, Shoop was hired by Head Coach Jeff Scott to serve as the University of South Florida defensive coordinator. Following a 54-28 loss to Temple on November 5, 2022, Scott and Shoop were both relieved of their duties at South Florida.

== Personal ==
Bob's brother, John Shoop, is also a football coach, having had stints both at the collegiate level and with the NFL.

== Head coaching record ==
Year	Team	Overall	Conference	Standing	Bowl/playoffs
Columbia Lions (Ivy League) (2003–2005)
2003	Columbia	4–6	3–4	6th	
2004	Columbia	1–9	1–6	T–7th	
2005	Columbia	2–8	0–7	8th	
Columbia:		7–23	4–17		
Total:		7–23			
