= Birmingham Bulls (American football) =

American Football team based in the United Kingdom

- Established: 1983
- Based in: Birmingham
- Home stadium: Erdington RFC
- League: BAFA National Leagues
- Division: NFC 1 South

Personnel
- Head coach: Matthew Sheldon

Championships
- League titles (0): 4 (1986, 1988, 1991, 1995)
- Division titles (0): 20 (1985, 1986, 1987, 1988, 1989, 1990, 1991, 1992, 1994, 1995, 1996, 1999, 2000, 2001, 2002, 2003, 2004, 2005, 2006, 2019)

Current uniform
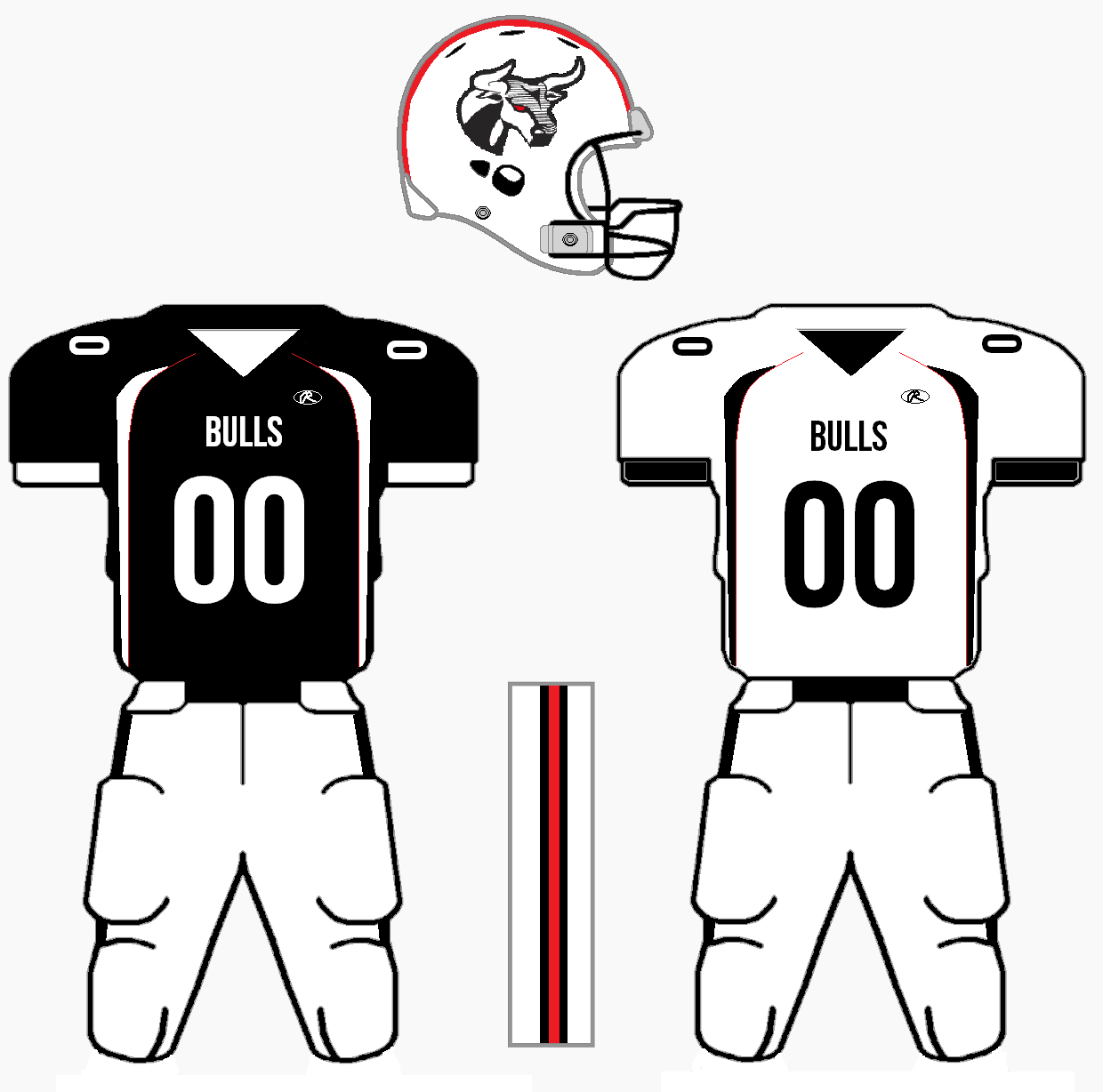

The Birmingham Bulls are an American football team based in Birmingham, United Kingdom. They play their home games at Kings Norton RFC in Hopwood. They are a member of the NFC Division One South in the BAFA National Leagues.

The Bulls are one of the longer established American football teams playing in the United Kingdom, having been founded in 1983, and are one of the most successful teams in British American Football, winning 4 British titles and 19 conference championships.

The Bulls field a senior team in the BAFA National Leagues with Matthew Sheldon the Head Coach since 2018.

They also field a youth team in the Under 17 system, and in 2019 they announced a partnership with the Black Country Vipers to provide Under 19s football in the Birmingham-Black Country region.

== History ==
=== Early years ===
Jerry Hartman, a former US military policeman and security guard for Howard Hughes with some College Football experience formed the team in a local park, and by April 1984, there was enough interest to begin a fully fledged adult team. They are named after the local landmark, The Bull Ring. and were financed by local businessman Dave Gill, who later became the Bulls' first chairman and would go on to become chairman of the British American Football Association.

On Friday 8 June, the Bulls played their first game against the Milton Keynes Bucks at the Alexander Stadium, losing 40–7. They later took residence in Salford Park, underneath the Gravelly Hill Interchange, and in later years, the club attempted to purchase the land from the local council.

In 1986, as members of the BAFL, under coach Warren Tate, the Bulls won their first national championship, and represented the UK in the inaugural Eurobowl, finishing third, losing to eventual runners-up, the Bologna Doves. In 1988, the Bulls won their second national championship, and first in the Budweiser League, beating the London Olympians at Loftus Road 30–6, and again qualifying for the Eurobowl. However, they once more lost to the eventual runners up, this time the Amsterdam Crusaders.

In 1989 off-season, the entire Bulls starting secondary was arrested on charges ranging from armed robbery to assault. Now owned by local businessman and Don Ho impersonator Frank Leadon, the team suffered internal strife with American lineman James Thornton regularly threatening to get himself deported, with Leadon himself leaving the club and returning multiple times. Businessman and father of nose tackle Andy Webb, Dave Webb took over ownership of the team part way through the season, with the Bulls' payroll the highest in the league.

the Bulls again made the Budweiser Bowl to challenge for the national championship, but just hours before the game, star quarterback and coach, Russ Jensen, left the team for financial reasons. The Bulls lost to the Manchester Spartans 21–14. In the same year, due to protests against Apartheid from the Bulls' supporters club, the team turned down the offer of a tour of South Africa, estimated at the time to be worth $100,000. It was in 1989 that former sportswriter for the Boston Herald, Michael Globetti, joined the Bulls and authored the book God Save The Quarterback!.

=== The nineties ===
Under the banner of the NDMA league, the Bulls took their third national championship in 1991, defeating the London Olympians 39–38 at the Alexander Stadium, with kicker Mark Webb scoring the winning field goal with just 17 seconds remaining. In 1992, the Bulls again faced Eurobowl disappointment, falling to the eventual winners, the Amsterdam Crusaders once more. The result of the loss was challenged by the Bulls due to player registration issues, but the appeal failed. This failed appeal was part of the reasoning given for the withdrawal of BAFA from the European governing body.

In 1995, the Bulls won their most recent national championship, defeating the London Olympians once more, in a 34–30 game. However, the Olympians got their revenge later in the year, knocking the Bulls out of the Eurobowl at the quarter-final stage, before going onto finish as runners-up. After a re-invention, the Bulls began life in Division 2 in 1996.

The Bulls reached the national championship again in 1999, but fell to the London Olympians in a close, defence-heavy 9–6 loss.

=== New millennium and recent years ===
The result of the 1999 Britbowl was repeated a year later in 2000, when the London Olympians again defeated the Bulls in the national championship game, 34–26.

There followed a down period in the Bulls history, marked by several play-off appearances, a lone conference championship in 2005, and emerging rivalries with the Coventry Jets and Tamworth Phoenix.

As the Bulls attempted to emerge from the mediocrity of the 2000s, they focused heavily on recruitment within the local area, but they still struggled in the BAFA Premier Division North. In 2013, the Bulls junior team finished an undefeated season by defeating the Woodham Warriors in the junior Britbowl at Keepmoat Stadium, and were crowned national champions.

This would be the last year that the Bulls fielded a junior team, as a new team was formed through links with the BUAFL team, the Birmingham Lions and the newly founded Sandwell Steelers.

In 2014, in the second and final year of former Redditch Arrows head coach Ian Hill's tenure, despite a large rookie contingent, the Bulls came within one game of making the play-offs. 2015 saw a league restructure and the Bulls found themselves placed in the Division One SFC North, with former player, Mark Pagett, taking over the reins.

Following a further restructure, the Bulls played the 2016 season in the Midlands Football Conference 1.

At the end of the 2017 season the Bulls were relegated into Division Two of the BAFA National League system after winning just one of their ten games. They finished with the same record as Coventry Jets but were relegated based on the head-to-head record having each won one of the two games but with the Bulls defeat to the Jets by a greater points margin.

Head Coach Mark Pagett resigned at the end of the 2017 season with long serving player Matthew Sheldon taking over the reins.

The Bulls were placed in the Division 2 NFC South. With an eight-game regular season schedule the Bulls finished with 7 wins and 1 defeat, losing their final league fixture 14–8 at home to Staffordshire Surge which ensure their rivals were crowned division winners. The Bulls entered into the play-offs as the number 4 seed and after a 16–6 win at home to Halton Spartans in the quarter-final they faced a long trip north to Aberdeen to face the Roughnecks for a place in the Northern Conference Final where the Bulls fell in a 16–14 defeat.

In the 2019 season, the Bulls completed a perfect regular season, finishing 8–0 in the NFC2 South moving into the play-offs as the number 1 seed in the Northern Conference. In the quarter-final they faced division rival Staffordshire Surge and won through to the semi-finals with a 43–6 victory. In the semi-final they once again fell to a Scottish team to miss out on promotion to Division 1, Inverclyde Goliaths securing promotion and Bowl place with a 30–12 victory.

In November 2019 the new league structure saw the Bulls moved into the SFC2 Central Division where they will face Ouse Valley Eagles, Worcestershire Black Knights, Northants Knights and Hereford Stampede.

== Staff ==
Birmingham Bulls staff

Senior Team

- Head coach – Matthew Sheldon
- Assistant head coach – Joe Blythe
- Offensive coordinator, Quarterbacks – Doug Cotterell
- Defensive coordinator – Colin Nash
- Special teams coordinator, Linebackers – Steve Brown
- Wide receivers – Ron Gifford
- Offensive line – Matthew Munslow
- Defensive line – Kevin Mills
- Linebackers – Joe Mattu
- Defensive backs – Paul Roberts
- Defensive backs – Travis Masters

== Logos and uniforms ==
The Birmingham Bulls traditionally play with white helmets, with one thicker black stripe surrounded by two thinner red stripes. Their facemask colour is black. A cut-out of the Bull from the full team logo is positioned on both sides of the helmet. In 2013, the Bulls celebrated their 30th anniversary and reverted to the use of their original "Three Legged Bull" logo for a season.

Their home jerseys are typically black, with white numbers and a red trim, while their away jerseys are reversed, being mainly white, with black numbers and maintaining the red trim. Their game pants for both home and away kits are white, with a black and red stripe running the length of the leg. The Bulls have traditionally worn mostly black socks.

As part of a new look for the club from the 2018 season onwards the Bulls play in all black uniforms with the changes making their debut in the opening league fixture with Knottingley Raiders on Sunday 15 April 2018.

The spring of 2019 also saw a new club logo announced as part of a move to re-brand the club for a new era.

== Facilities ==
The Bulls have played at Erdington RFC since 2025.

== Rivalries ==
=== London Olympians ===
The Bulls' rivalry with the London Olympians is largely historic, meeting several times in the late 1980s and early 1990s in both the league and playoffs, with the rivalry coming to a head in the 1988, 1991, 1994 and 1995 Britbowls, with the Bulls winning three to the Olympians one.

In recent years, the two have rarely, if at all, played each other due to league realignments and a relative lack of playoff success for both organisations.

=== Coventry Jets ===
Aside from being purely a local affair, the rivalry became significant when the Jets returned in their latest guise, initiated by several former Bulls, including quarterback Jamie Kilby and Paul Newey.

Thanks in part to geographical proximity, the Jets and Bulls faced each other often. In 2008, the Jets handed the Bulls their heaviest defeat, in a very one sided 67–0 affair. In 2017, the Bulls were relegated to Division 2 after a final day defeat to the Jets. In 2018, the Coventry Jets folded, and were incorporated into the Etone Jaguars.

=== Tamworth Phoenix ===
The Bulls' rivalry with the Tamworth Phoenix is not dissimilar to that of the Jets. Whilst they are geographically close, the rivalry was compounded by the fact that the Phoenix were, like many of the younger Midlands teams, founded by former Birmingham Bulls players.

== Notable former players ==
The following notable players appeared for the Birmingham Bulls during their career:

- David Stanton (United Kingdom) – Quarterback
- Russ Jensen (United States) – Quarterback
- Mark Cohen (United Kingdom) – Wide receiver
- Steve Pisarkiewicz (United States) – Quarterback
- Paul Roberts (United Kingdom) – Defensive back
- Colin Nash (United Kingdom) – Linebacker
- Bob Shoop (United States) – Wide receiver
- Pat Roach (United Kingdom) – Defensive lineman
- Mark Webb (United Kingdom) – Kicker

== Records ==
All-time Bulls leaders
Leader	Player	Record number
Total Points	Mark Cohen	336 Points
Passing yards	Russ Jensen	5,201 passing yards
Passing TDs	Russ Jensen	55 passing touchdowns
Rushing yards	Paul Duncan	2,856 rushing yards
Rushing TDs	Trevor Carthy	43 rushing touchdowns
Receiving yards	Mark Cohen	3,740 receiving yards
Receiving touchdowns	Mark Cohen	51 receiving touchdowns
Most Total Tackles	Colin Nash	673 tackles
Sacks	Ken Lewis	72.5 Sacks
Most Fumble Recoveries	Ken Lewis	19 fumble recoveries
Most Interceptions	Paul Roberts	30 interceptions
Most Field Goals	Mark Webb	18 field goals
Most Extra Point Kicks	Mark Webb	160 extra point kicks
Most Punt Yards	Andy Raffo	4,676 punt yards
Most Kick Return Yards	Paul Roberts	1,368 kick return yards
Most Punt Return Yards	Paul Roberts	909 punt return yards

== Youth & junior football ==
In 2013, the Bulls youth team finished as national champions.

The Bulls field a youth (13–17) and junior (17–19) teams in conjunction with the Black Country Vipers, with the youth team playing under the Bulls' name, and the junior team under the Vipers'.
