= 2015 Birmingham Bulls season =

- Head coach: Mark Pagett
- Home stadium: Erin Go Bragh

Results
- Record: 4–6
- Division place: 6th (SFC1)
- Playoffs: did not qualify
- Team MVP: Mark Bonazebi

Uniform
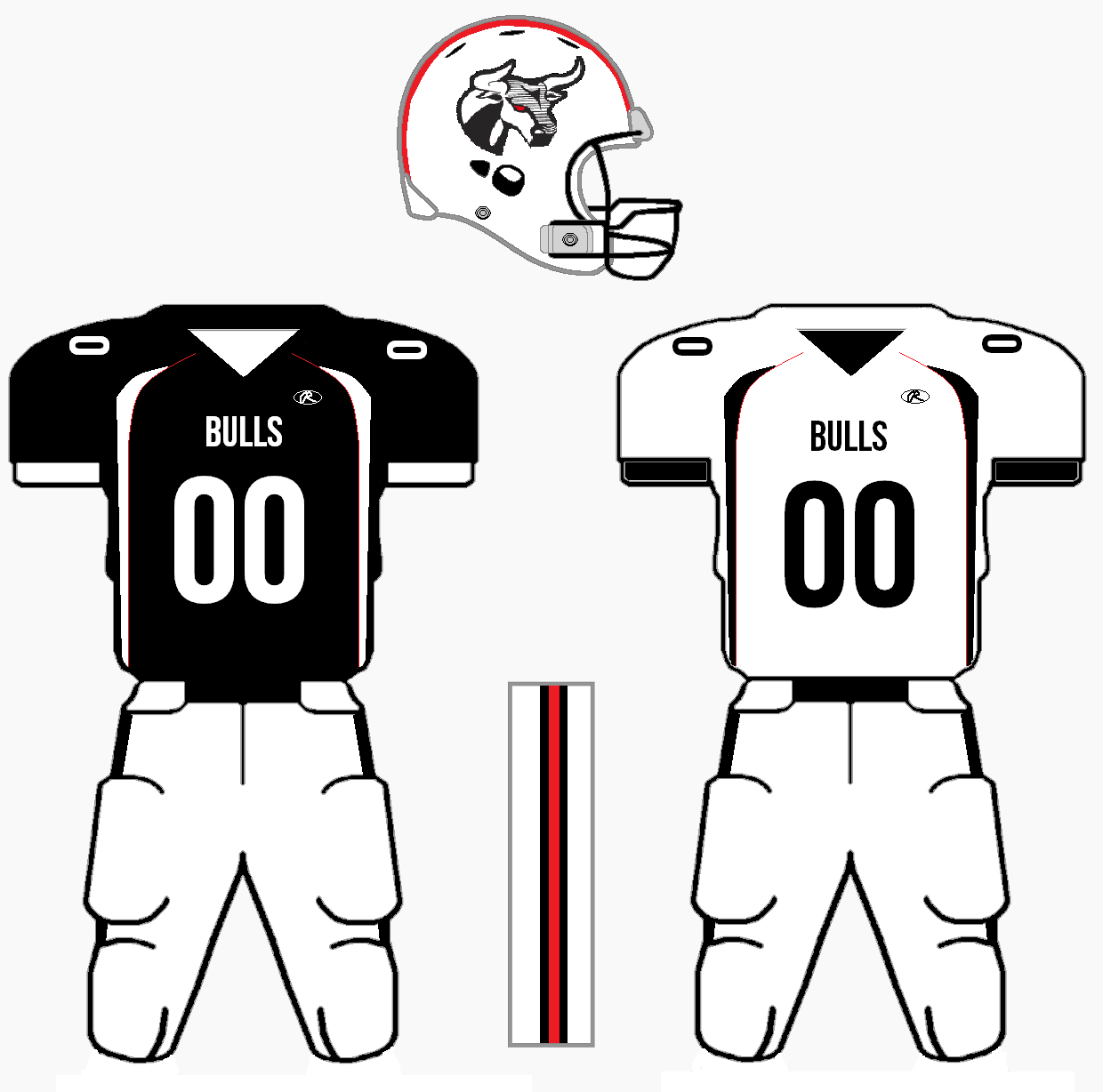

The 2015 Birmingham Bulls season was the team's 32nd season in competitive British American Football. It was also the first season under rookie head coach Mark Pagett and Chairman Richard Penwright, whilst Rob Amor returned for a fifth year as club secretary. The Bulls entered the 2015 season in the second tier following a league restructure, and were considered by some to be favourites for post-season success and immediate promotion back to the top tier.

Following the departure of the previous coaching staff, former player Matt Sheldon was appointed as Offensive coordinator, while Alan Steel, departing the Coventry Jets, was appointed as Defensive coordinator. Coaches Mark Webb and Paul Roberts were retained in their role as Special Teams and Defensive Back coaches respectively.

Part way through the season, Offensive coordinator Matt Sheldon stepped down from his role and was replaced by O-Line coach Gary Hodgen. Despite early season promise, including an away win against the eventual league champions Farnham Knights, a five-game losing streak put paid to any notion of post-season football in 2015.

== Recruitment ==
Following successful recruitment sessions in the winter of 2014, several rookies joined the team, along with former players returning from playing in Europe.

=== Rookies ===
Position	Player
FS	Dotun Ademiju
ILB	Mohammed Awil
WR	Joshua Boulton
DE	Matthew Brown
CB	Elliott Forster
DE	Gavin Henry
OLB	Dominic Taylor
OLB	Simon Taylor
DE	Jay Willis

=== Transfers ===
Position	Player	Previous Team
OLB	Dimeji Ademiju	Walney Terriers
FS	Oheeul Choudhury	Coventry Jets
WR	Marc Henry	Yorkshire Rams
OL	Andrew Kane	Glasgow Lions
OL	Tom Levick	Lura Bulls
CB	Calum Roberts	Colchester Gladiators
DT	Scott Robinson	Coventry Jets
K	Luca Zigliani	Lazio Marines

== Staff ==
Head coach

- Head coach: Mark Pagett

Offensive coaches

- Offensive coordinator: Matt Sheldon
- Quarterbacks coach: Doug Cotterell
- Running backs coach: Paul Williams
- Wide receivers coach: Graham Huber
- Offensive line Coach: Gary Hodgen

Defensive coaches

- Defensive coordinator: Alan Steel
- Linebackers coach: John McManus
- Defensive backs coach: Paul Roberts

Special teams

- Special teams coordinator: Mark Webb

== Playing staff ==
=== Final roster ===
Birmingham Bulls 2016
Quarterbacks: Richard Penwright; Dan Wilkes; Running backs & Full backs: Marc Bonazebi; Tyrone Johnston; Marcus Rey; Sam Scott; Dean Thomas; Wide receivers & Tight ends: Michael Beaty; Reece Bell; Joshua Boulton; Michael Doyle; Ben Fleet; Marc Henry; Kieron Hinds	Offensive linemen: Craig Chadwick; Andrew Kane; Tom Levick; David Pemberton; Tom Townend; Brendan Woulfe; Defensive linemen: Olu Amudipe; Matthew Brown; Anton Chisholm; Tom Durn; Lee Macken; Scott Robinson	Linebackers: Dimeji Ademiju; Mohammed Awil; Adam Fleet; Jake Harbon; Ilya Kaznachyeev; Stephen Stoakes; Dominic Taylor; Simon Taylor; Dan Williams; Defensive backs: Dotun Ademiju; Oheeul Choudhury; Elliot Forster; Jack Pemberton; Calum Roberts; Gareth Thomas	Special teams: Luca Zigliani; Injured Reserve: Gavin Henry; Aamir Saleem; Leon Simkin; _{Rookies in italics.}

=== Statistics ===
Offence

Category	Name	
Passing yards	Dan Wilkes	204
Passing TDs	Richard Penwright & Dan Wilkes	1
Rushing yards	Mark Bonazebi	1206
Rushing TDs	Mark Bonazebi	14
Receiving yards	Michael Beaty	187
Receiving TDs	Michael Doyle & Mark Bonazebi	1

Defence

Category	Name	
Total tackles	Olu Amudipe	57
Solo tackles	Olu Amudipe	29
Sacks	Olu Amudipe	6.5
Interceptions	Gareth Thomas	8
Forced fumbles	Jake Harbon, Domeni White, Lee Macken	2
Fumble recoveries	Olu Amudipe & Stephen Stoakes	2

Special teams

Category	Name	
Field goals	Luca Zigliani	1
Punt yards	Luca Zigliani	1317
Kick return yards	Gareth Thomas	304
Punt return yards	Gareth Thomas	240

Bulls players set or equalled several team records throughout the 2015 season. Mark Bonazebi recorded 1206 rushing yards, the most in Bulls history, and his 93-yard run against the Hertfordshire Cheetahs was the longest in team history. Gareth Thomas' 9 total takeaways was a new Bulls season record, and his 4 interceptions against the Hertfordshire Cheetahs was a record for most single game takeaways and interceptions. His 8 total interceptions equalled Hall of Famer Paul Roberts' single season record. His 125 punt return yards against the East Kent Mavericks was also a single-game record for the Bulls.

=== Award winners ===
The Bulls held their annual awards night on 20 September 2015.

Award	Winner
Team MVP	Mark Bonazebi
Player's Player	Mark Bonazebi
Offensive MVP	Mark Bonazebi
Defensive MVP	Gareth Thomas
Special teams MVP	Gareth Thomas
Coaches' MVP	Richard Penwright
Offensive Development Award	David Pemberton
Defensive Development Award	Stephen Stoakes

== Schedule ==
=== Preseason ===
Week	Opponent	Result	Record	Location
1	Coventry Jets	**L** 0–20	0–1	Erin Go Bragh

=== Regular season ===
Week	Opponent	Result	Record	Location
1	**Ouse Valley Eagles**	**L** 14–21	0–1	Erin Go Bragh
2	at **Cambridgeshire Cats**	**W** 34–12	1–1	Coldham's Common
3	**Hertfordshire Cheetahs**	**W** 17–9	2–1	Erin Go Bragh
4	at Farnham Knights	**W** 28–26	3–1	Farnham RUFC
5	Colchester Gladiators	**L** 7–9	3–2	Erin Go Bragh
6	Solent Thrashers	**L** 7–10	3–3	Erin Go Bragh
7	at East Kent Mavericks	**L** 0–14	3–4	Simon Langton Boys School
8	at **Hertfordshire Cheetahs**	**L** 8–28	3–5	St Albans Rugby Club
9	at **Ouse Valley Eagles**	**L** 18–23	3–6	Bedford International Athletics Stadium
10	**Cambridgeshire Cats**	**W** 50–0	4–6	Erin Go Bragh

Note: Intra-division opponents are in bold text.

=== Game Notes ===
Week 1: vs Ouse Valley Eagles
The Bulls lost a narrow opener to the visiting Ouse Valley Eagles by one score following a controversial touchdown at the end of the second quarter. The Eagles capitalised on Bulls turnovers in the fourth quarter to pull away and secure an opening day victory.

	Q1	Q2	Q3	Q4	
Bulls	0	8	6	0	**14**
**Eagles**	0	7	0	14	**21**

Player statistics

**Passers**

- Dan Wilkes: 0/4, 0 yards, 0 TD, 1 INT
- Stuart Williams: 0/13, 0 yards, 0 TD, 2 INT

**Rushers**

- Rob Brown: 14 carries, 85 yards, 0 TDs
- Marc Bonazebi: 3 carries, 36 yards, 1 TD

**Defenders**

- Jake Harbon: 10 total tackles, 7 solo, 1 INT, 1 FF, 1 FR, 1 TD
- Jack Pemberton: 5 total tackles, 4 solo, 2 INTs, 1 break up
- Stephen Stoakes: 6 total tackles, 3 solo, 1 FF
- Dominic Taylor: 7 total tackles, 6 solo

Week 2: at Cambridgeshire Cats
The Bulls travelled to Cambridge and won comfortably thanks to a strong ground attack from Rob Brown and Mark Bonazebi and pass rush from the defensive line.

	Q1	Q2	Q3	Q4	
**Bulls**	0	13	13	8	**34**
Cats	6	0	0	6	**12**

Player statistics

**Passers**

- Dan Wilkes: 3/12, 27 yards, 0 TD, 0 INT

**Rushers**

- Rob Brown: 20 carries, 157 yards, 3 TDs
- Marc Bonazebi: 21 carries, 114 yards, 2 TDs

**Receivers**

- Kieron Hinds: 1 rec, 14 yards, 0 TD

**Defenders**

- Scott Robinson: 4 total tackles, 3 solo, 3 sacks, 1 FR
- Lee Macken: 3 total tackles, 3 solo, 1 FF
- Jake Harbon: 10 total tackles, 5 solo, 0.5 sacks
- Tom Durn: 1 total tackle, 1 solo, 1.5 sacks

Week 3: vs Hertfordshire Cheetahs
Back at home, the Bulls secondary stepped up in a big way, picking the ball off seven times, including four interceptions by cornerback Gareth Thomas, while Bonazebi again carried the offence to move the Bulls to 3–1.

	Q1	Q2	Q3	Q4	
**Bulls**	3	14	0	0	**17**
Cheetahs	2	0	0	7	**9**

Player statistics

**Passers**

- Dan Wilkes: 3/15, 56 yards, 0 TD, 1 INT

**Rushers**

- Marc Bonazebi: 27 carries, 155 yards, 1 TD

**Receivers**

- Michael Beaty: 2 rec, 52 yards, 0 TD

**Defenders**

- Gareth Thomas: 0 tackles, 4 INT, 2 break ups
- Dominic Taylor: 3 total tackles, 1 solo, 1 INT, 1 TD
- Olu Amudipe: 7 total tackles, 3 solo, 1.5 sacks
- Jack Pemberton: 4 total tackles, 2 solo, 1 INT

Week 4: at Farnham Knights
The Bulls travelled to the favoured Knights but a 300+ yard display by running back Bonazebi paired with a last second pick by Thomas meant the Bulls came away with a signature win.

	Q1	Q2	Q3	Q4	
**Bulls**	6	0	16	6	**28**
Knights	0	10	8	8	**26**

Player statistics

**Passers**

- Dan Wilkes: 1/12, 16 yards, 0 TD, 4 INT

**Rushers**

- Marc Bonazebi: 32 carries, 310 yards, 4 TD

**Receivers**

- Michael Beaty: 1 rec, 16 yards, 0 TD

**Defenders**

- Gareth Thomas: 6 total tackles, 6 solo, 1 INT, 1 break up
- Jake Harbon: 7 total tackles, 3 solo, 1 INT, 1 break up
- Jack Pemberton: 4 total tackles, 3 solo, 1 INT, 1 break up
- Dotun Ademiju: 4 total tackles, 2 solo, 1 sack

Week 5: vs Colchester Gladiators
The Bulls came back down to earth with a bump, and despite signs of an improving passing game, a number of turnovers brought an end to the Bulls' winning streak.

	Q1	Q2	Q3	Q4	
Bulls	0	0	7	0	**7**
**Gladiators**	0	7	2	0	**9**

Player statistics

**Passers**

- Dan Wilkes: 2/15, 82 yards, 1 TD, 3 INT

**Rushers**

- Marc Bonazebi: 33 carries, 97 yards, 0 TD

**Receivers**

- Marc Bonazebi: 1 rec, 47 yards, 1 TD
- Michael Beaty: 1 rec, 35 yards, 0 TD

**Defenders**

- Tom Durn: 8 total tackles, 7 solo, 1 FF
- Domeni White: 5 total tackles, 3 solo, 1 FF, 1 break up
- Stephen Stoakes: 5 total tackles, 1 solo, 1 FR
- Dotun Ademiju: 6 total tackles, 3 solo, 2 break ups

Week 6: vs Solent Thrashers
The Bulls defence remained stout holding the visiting Thrashers to well below their season average, but a struggling offence meant back-to-back losses for the first time in 2015.

	Q1	Q2	Q3	Q4	
Bulls	7	0	0	0	**7**
**Thrashers**	7	7	0	0	**14**

Player statistics

**Passers**

- Dan Wilkes: 4/9, 23 yards, 0 TD, 1 INT

**Rushers**

- Marc Bonazebi: 21 carries, 74 yards, 1 TD

**Receivers**

- Michael Beaty: 4 rec, 23 yards, 0 TD

**Defenders**

- Jack Pemberton: 3 total tackles, 2 solo, 1 INT, 2 break ups
- Dotun Ademiju: 5 total tackles, 3 solo, 1 FR, 1 break up
- Olu Amudipe: 5 total tackles, 3 solo, 1 sack, 1 FF, 1 break up
- Gareth Thomas: 5 total tackles, 1 solo, 1 INT

Week 7: at East Kent Mavericks
The Bulls made the long trip as heavy favourites but were shut out on offence for the first time since July 2014 in a hard-fought defensive battle.

	Q1	Q2	Q3	Q4	
Bulls	0	0	0	0	**0**
**Mavericks**	10	0	0	0	**10**

Player statistics

**Passers**

- Richard Penwright: 6/15, 63 yards, 0 TD, 1 INT

**Rushers**

- Marcus Rey: 12 carries, 44 yards, 0 TD

**Receivers**

- Michael Beaty: 2 rec, 46 yards, 0 TD

**Defenders**

- Jake Harbon: 10 total tackles, 7 solo, 1 INT, 1 FF
- Olu Amudipe: 7 total tackles, 4 solo, 1 sack, 1 breakup
- Gareth Thomas: 3 total tackles, 1 solo, 1 INT, 2 breakups
- Adam Fleet: 8 total tackles, 5 solo, 0.5 sacks

Week 8: at Hertfordshire Cheetahs
The Bulls struggled on a hot day in St. Albans and fell to their third straight defeat putting their play-off chances in jeopardy.

	Q1	Q2	Q3	Q4	
Bulls	0	0	0	8	**8**
**Cheetahs**	7	14	0	7	**28**

Player statistics

**Passers**

- Richard Penwright: 1/3, 5 yards, 0 TD, 1 INT
- Daniel Maher: 2/16, 12 yards, 0 TD, 2 INTs

**Rushers**

- Marcus Rey: 3 carries, 71 yards, 1 TD
- Mark Bonazebi: 11 carries, 108 yards, 0 TD

**Receivers**

- Marcus Rey: 1 rec, 11 yards, 0 TD

**Defenders**

- Dotun Ademiju: 6 total tackles, 3 solo, 1 sack, 3 break ups
- Jack Pemberton: 5 total tackles, 4 solo, 1 INT
- Adam Fleet: 7 total tackles, 3 solo, 1 FF
- Ilya Kaznachyeev: 10 total tackles, 9 solo

Week 9: at Ouse Valley Eagles
A Bulls squad decimated by injury travelled to Bedford and kept it close in a rain-soaked return fixture against their divisional rivals, but ended their hopes of play off football with another defeat.

	Q1	Q2	Q3	Q4	
Bulls	0	6	0	12	**18**
**Eagles**	17	0	0	6	**21**

Player statistics

**Passers**

- Richard Penwright: 8/15, 67 yards, 1 TD, 2 INTs

**Rushers**

- Mark Bonazebi: 38 carries, 166 yards, 2 TDs

**Receivers**

- Michael Doyle: 1 rec, 47 yards, 1 TD

**Defenders**

- Olu Amudipe: 5 total tackles, 4 solo, 2 sacks, 2 FR
- Gareth Thomas: 4 total tackles, 3 solo, 1 INT, 1 FF, 3 break ups
- Simon Taylor: 5 total tackles, 4 solo, 1 FF
- Dotun Ademiju: 3 total tackles, 3 solo, 1 FF, 1 break up

Week 10: vs Cambridgeshire Cats
The Bulls stopped the rot on the final day of the season by shutting out the already-relegated Cambridgeshire Cats at home and putting up their highest score of the season.

	Q1	Q2	Q3	Q4	
**Bulls**	14	6	22	8	**50**
Cats	0	0	0	0	**0**

Player statistics

**Passers**

- Richard Penwright: 1/5, 8 Yards, 0 TD, 1 INT

**Rushers**

- Mark Bonazebi: 14 carries, 146 yards, 3 TD
- Dean Thomas: 5 carries, 60 yards, 1 TD
- Michael Doyle: 3 carries, 22 yards, 1 TD

**Receivers**

- Michael Beaty: 1 rec, 8 yards, 0 TD

**Defenders**

- Marcus Rey: 4 total tackles, 2 solo, 2 INT, 1 TD, 1 break up
- Lee Macken: 4 total tackles, 3 solo, 1 FF
- Dan Williams: 5 total tackles, 4 solo, 1 FR
- Gareth Thomas: 2 total tackles, 1 solo, 1 FR, 2 break ups
