= Redditch Arrows =

American football team

- Established: 1986
- Based in: Redditch/Birmingham
- Home stadium: Kings Norton Rugby Club

Championships
- Division titles (0): 9 (2004, 2000, 1998, 1996, 1995, 1993, 1990, 1989, 1987)

Current uniform
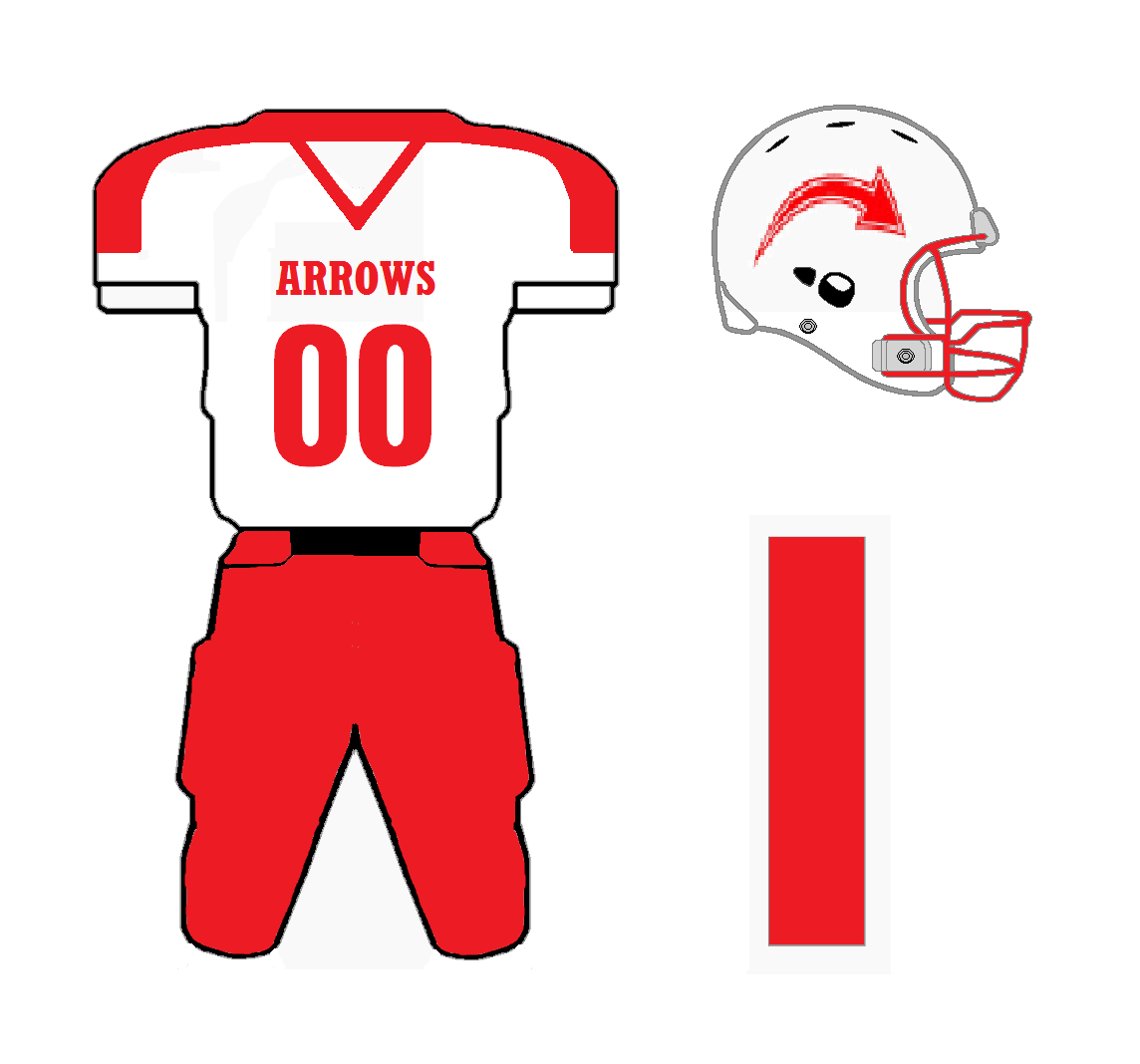

The Redditch Arrows were an American football team based initially in Redditch and later in Birmingham, United Kingdom. They were formed in 1986 and disbanded in 2009.

== History ==
The Arrows were established in early 1986. During the late 1980s, they played in three different leagues; the UKAFL, the Budweiser League and then BNGL, during which they made the playoffs twice. In 1989, after a playoff run, they reached the BNGL Premier Division Bowl Game, where they lost to the Kingston Thames Pirates, who were in their debut season, 66-8. During this time, they played their home games at the Abbey Stadium in Redditch.

After a down period, punctuated by being unable to compete in 1992 due to a player shortage, they reached the BAFL Division 3 final, where they lost to the Winchester Rifles. After again making the playoffs in 2000, they were promoted to Division One.

Finished with a creditable 3-5-0 record in 2001. Had a poor 2002 season finishing with a 0-9-1 record which resulted in them returning to Division Two in 2003, where they finished with a 4-6-0 record. Had a stunning regular season in 2004 finishing 9-0-1, but fell at the first hurdle in the playoffs in a thriller to Sussex Thunder 23-22. In the 2000s, the Arrows played their home games at Kings Norton RFC.

== Notable former players ==
All players listed below appeared for the Redditch Arrows during their career.

- QB Dave Stanton (United Kingdom)
- RB Anthony Perkins (United Kingdom)
- RB Charles Humphrey (United Kingdom)
- RB Dave Mills (United Kingdom)
- WR Mark Cohen (United Kingdom)
- OL/DE Matt Sheldon (United Kingdom)
- DB Mark Williams (United Kingdom)
- OL Gary Matthews (United Kingdom)
- OL David Robinson (United Kingdom)
- FL Darren Biddle (United Kingdom) .
- FS Karl Watkins🇬🇧
- WR Pete Morgan 🇬🇧
- LB Rich “Elmo” Wilby 🇬🇧

== Notable former coaches ==
- Ian Hill (United Kingdom)
- Mark Williams (United Kingdom)

== Season by season record ==
Year	Division	Record
2008	BAFL Division One Northern Conference	7–2–1*
2007	BAFL Division One Northern Conference	8–2–0*
2006	BAFL Division Two Central Conference	10–0–0*
2005	BAFL Division Two South Western Conference	4–6–0
2004	BSL Division Two South Western Conference	9–0–1*
2003	BSL Division Two South Western Conference	4–6–0
2002	BSL Division One Northern Conference	0–9–1
2001	BSL Division One Northern Conference	3–5–0
2000	BSL Division Two Northern Conference	7–1–0*
1999	BSL Division One Northern Conference	4–6–0*
1998	BSL Division Two North West Conference	8–2–0*
1997	BSL Division One South West & Midlands Conference	2–8–0
1996	BSL Division Three Midlands Conference	10–0–0*
1995	BAFA Division Three North West Conference	7–1–0*
1994	BAFA Division Three Northern Conference	6–3–1*
1993	BNGL First Division West Midlands Conference	9–1–0*
1992	NDMA Division Two Northern Conference	0–8–0
1991	NDMA Division Two Northern Conference	3-6-1
1990	BNGL National Division Midlands Conference	9–0–1*
1989	BNGL Premier Division Northern C Conference	7–2–1*
1988	Budweiser League Division One Central Conference	3–7–0
1987	UKAFL Central A Conference	9–1–0*
* qualified for playoffs
