= Nacionalna Liga Srbije =

Serbian American football league

Serbian National League
- Sport: American football
- Founded: 2003 (then in Serbia and Montenegro)
- First season: 2004
- Country: Serbia
- Most recent champion: Belgrade Vukovi (2024)
- Most titles: Wild Boars (9 titles)
- Website: safs.rs

The Nacionalna Liga Srbije (NLS) (Serbian National League) is the league of American football in Serbia. The current league champion is the Kragujevac Wild Boars.

== League history ==
=== League 2004 ===
The national league was founded 26 October 2003. First league game in Serbia was played in 2004 and 5 teams competed that year. Those teams were: Belgrade Vukovi, Kragujevac Wild Boars, Niš Steeds, Pančevo Panthers and Sirmium Legionaries.

Final game was played on November, 7th, 2004. in Kragujevac on Čika Dača football field, where home team Kragujevac Wild Boars defeated Belgrade Vukovi 21–6.

=== National Cup 2005 ===
Instead of a league in 2005, there was a cup held in Serbia. It was the first, and for now the only official cup played in this country. Ten teams took part in this competition. Those teams were: Belgrade Vukovi, Kragujevac Wild Boars, Sirmium Legionaries, Novi Sad Dukes, Kraljevo Royal Crowns, Pančevo Panthers, Belgrade Blue Dragons, Niš Steeds, Požarevac Outlaws, Čačak Mad Dogs.

Final game was played in Belgrade on FK Obilić field on Jun, 19th 2005. and this time Vukovi defeated Wild Boars, 20–7.

=== League 2006 ===
Four teams started South-Eastern League of American football, a.k.a. CEFL. Those teams were Vukovi, Wild Boars, Legionaries and Dukes.

An unofficial league without pad and helmets was also played in Serbia. The popularity of American football was rapidly increasing in Serbia by this time. 11 Team took part in this league, they were divided into two divisions North and South.

North:
1. Klek Knights
2. Pančevo Panthers
3. Sombor Celtis
4. Šabac Sharks
5. Kula Hunters

South:
1. Kraljevo Royal Crowns
2. Požarevac Outlaws
3. Električar
4. Smederevo Bedemi
5. Obrenovac Nebeski Gromovi
6. Jagodina Strawberry Celts

Klek Knights defeated Kraljevo Royal Crowns 16-7, in the final game that was played in Vršac on October 15, 2006.

=== National League 2007 ===
After one year when teams from CEFL did not play domestic league, in 2007 every team took part. From 2007 there was a domestic competition with full equipment. There was three competitions this year:

National Competition 07 which was made from teams that played domestic league in 2006, and new teams. It was played with equipment, and teams were divided in two divisions:

Division A:
Belgrade Blue Dragons
Sirmium Legionaries
Klek Knights
Pančevo Panthers

Division B:
Vrbas Hunters
Belgrade Vukovi
Vršac
Požarevac Outlaws
Obrenovac Sky Thunders

The final game was played on October 7, in Inđija where Klek Knights defeated Belgrade Blue Dragons, 21–14. These two teams played against two best CEFL teams in National Championship for the domestic title in 2007.

National Championship 07

There were three games played in National Championship, and two teams from National Competition played against two CEFL teams.

Semi-Final:
Klek Knights - Novi Sad Dukes 10–17
Vukovi Beograd - Beograd Blue Dragons 27–21

Final
Vukovi Beograd - Novi Sad Dukes 25–15
This game was played in Belgrade on November, 4th 2007.

SAFS League

This was the third league in Serbia in 2007. This was the league without necessary equipment. Seven teams made it, and they were divided into two divisions:

North
Šabac Sharks
Inđija Indians
Smederevo Bedemi

South
Čačak Angel Warriors
Niš Imperatori
Mladenovac Forestlanders
Jagodina Ćurani

Final game was played in Klek on September 29, and Čačak Angel Warriors defeated Niš Imperatori, by a large margin 42:6.

== Serbian First League ==
Every team from Serbia plays every one or two weeks. Teams are divided into two divisions - A and B. Both divisions have three teams.

Division A: Wild Boars Kragujevac, Blue Dragons Belgrade, Jagodina Black Hornets. Division B: Vukovi Belgrade, Wild Dogs Novi Sad, Inđija Indians.

=== System ===
In the regular season each team plays home and away game within the division (4 games), and one game against teams from the other division (3 games). Top two teams from each division advance to the playoff semifinals. Third-placed teams play in the play-out game. Loser of the play-out game plays against the winner of Serbian Second League for the spot in the Serbian First League 2020.

In the playoff semifinals division winners play against second-placed teams from the other division (A1 vs B2; B1 vs A2). Winners advance to the Serbian Bowl.

=== Season ===
Wild Boars went undefeated (7-0) in the regular season and won division A. Blue Dragons (3-4) finished second and Black Hornets (1-6) finished third in division A.

Vukovi Belgrade won division B (6-1), Wild Dogs finished second (4-3). Due to the organisational and financial problems Inđija Indians (0-7) withdrew from the competition. Therefore, play-out matches were canceled and the winner of Serbian Second League Banat Bulls qualified to play in the Serbian First League 2020.

In the semifinals Wild Boars defeated Wild Dogs 35:12. In the Belgrade Derby Vukovi defeated Blue Dragons 44:21.

In the Serbian Bowl XV Wild Boars defeated Vukovi 60:55 and won their ninth title.

== Serbian Pro Bowl ==
=== System ===
Serbian Probowl was introduced in 2008 Season.

It host best players from North and South divisions. These two teams play each other in the Probowl game.

=== History ===
Year	Winner	Loser	Result
2008 - Kragujevac	North	South	21 - 12

== Serbian Bowls ==
#	Year	Champion	Opponent	Result
I	2004 - SAFS League	Kragujevac Wild Boars	Belgrade Vukovi	21–6
	2005 - Serbian Cup	Belgrade Vukovi	Kragujevac Wild Boars	20–6
	2006 - SAFS League	Klek Knights	Kraljevo Royal Crowns	16–7
II	2006 - SELAF League	Kragujevac Wild Boars	Belgrade Vukovi	23–12
III	2007 - SAFS League	Belgrade Vukovi	Novi Sad Dukes	25–15
IV	2008 - SAFS League	Kragujevac Wild Boars	Belgrade Vukovi	39–33
V	2009 - SAAF League	Belgrade Vukovi	Novi Sad Dukes	46–0
5	2009 - SAFS League	Kragujevac Wild Boars	Belgrade Blue Dragons	67–33
VI	2010 - SAAF League	Belgrade Vukovi	Novi Sad Dukes	40–2
6	2010 - SAFS League	Kragujevac Wild Boars	Čačak Angel Warriors	69–26
VII	2011 - SAAF League	Belgrade Vukovi	Kragujevac Wild Boars	51–36
VIII	2012 - SAAF League	Belgrade Vukovi	Kragujevac Wild Boars	35–24
IX	2013 - SAAF League	Belgrade Vukovi	Kragujevac Wild Boars	42–0
X	2014 - SAAF League	Belgrade Vukovi	Kragujevac Wild Boars	27–17
XI	2015 - SAAF League	Novi Sad Dukes	Belgrade Vukovi	25–23
XII	2016 - SAAF League	Kragujevac Wild Boars	Belgrade Vukovi	53–29
XIII	2017 - SAAF League	Kragujevac Wild Boars	Novi Sad Dukes	24–16
XIV	2018 - SAAF League	Kragujevac Wild Boars	Belgrade Vukovi	54–36
XV	2019 - SAAF League	Kragujevac Wild Boars	Belgrade Vukovi	60–55
XVI	2021	Belgrade Vukovi	Banat Bulls	24–14
XVII	2022	Belgrade Vukovi	Kragujevac Wild Boars	24–17
XVIII	2023	Kragujevac Wild Boars	Belgrade Vukovi	48–7
XIX	2024	Belgrade Vukovi	Kragujevac Wild Boars	28–6
XX	2025	Kragujevac Wild Boars	Beograd Blue Dragons	27–12
