= Central European Football League =

European American football league

- Formerly: Southeast European League of American Football (SELAF)
- Sport: American football
- Founded: 2005; 21 years ago
- First season: 2006
- No. of teams: 10
- Countries: England; France; Italy; Northern Ireland; Poland; Serbia; Spain; Switzerland
- Most recent champion: (Switzerland) Calanda Broncos (1st title)
- Most titles: (Serbia) Belgrade SBB Vukovi (6 titles)
- Broadcaster: Sport Klub
- Website: european-league.com

The Central European Football League (CEFL) is a European organization of American football which hosts an international competition every year. The final game of the CEFL Championship playoffs is dubbed the CEFL Bowl.

Until the formation of the CEFL Cup in 2017, the name of the organization was synonymous with its flagship competition – CEFL Championship, or simply "the league". Initially named Southeast European League of American Football (SELAF), it featured teams from Serbia and Slovenia in its introductory 2006 season. The following year teams from other countries joined the ranks and the name was changed to Central European Football League (CEFL) before the 2008 season. The first four seasons of the league were played during the spring and autumn, with a month-and-a-half to a three-month summer break. However, since 2010, the competition has taken place during the spring, typically from April to June. Over its many years of existence, the league has seen teams from across Europe join, starting from the Balkans and expanding outward to the rest of the continent.

== History ==
=== 2006 ===
The inaugural season featured a total of five teams: Belgrade Vukovi, Kragujevac Wild Boars, Novi Sad Dukes and Sirmium Legionaries from Serbia, as well as Ljubljana Silverhawks from Slovenia.

| Pos | Team | Pld | W | L | PF | PA | PD | Qualification |
|---|---|---|---|---|---|---|---|---|
| 1 | Kragujevac Wild Boars | 8 | 6 | 2 | 147 | 44 | +103 | SELAF Bowl I |
| 2 | Belgrade Vukovi | 8 | 6 | 2 | 190 | 89 | +101 | SELAF Bowl I |
| 3 | Novi Sad Dukes | 8 | 5 | 3 | 204 | 115 | +89 | |
| 4 | Ljubljana Silverhawks | 8 | 2 | 6 | 43 | 175 | −132 | |
| 5 | Sirmium Legionaries | 8 | 1 | 7 | 54 | 215 | −161 | |

Source: 2006 Standings

==== Final ====
The first ever league champions were the Wild Boars who beat Vukovi 23–12 in SELAF Bowl I, played on FK Radnički stadium in Belgrade on October 8.

| SELAF Bowl I October 8 |
| (Serbia) Belgrade Vukovi | 12 |
| (Serbia) Kragujevac Wild Boars | 23 |

=== 2007 ===
The second season saw the entry of two new teams, the Budapest Wolves and the CNC Gladiators. Meanwhile, the Legionaries left the competition. For the first time teams were split into two conferences: North and South. The Northern Conference consisted of the Gladiators, Silverhawks, and Wolves, while the Southern Conference included the three remaining Serbian teams: Dukes, Vukovi and Wild Boars. This season also marked the CEFL's debut on live television, with the semifinal and CEFL Bowl II broadcast on TV Avala.

==== Northern Conference ====
| Pos | Team | Pld | W | L | PF | PA | PD | Qualification |
|---|---|---|---|---|---|---|---|---|
| 1 | Budapest Wolves | 7 | 6 | 1 | 256 | 132 | +124 | Semifinals |
| 2 | CNC Gladiators | 7 | 3 | 4 | 184 | 151 | +33 | Semifinals |
| 3 | Ljubljana Silverhawks | 7 | 1 | 6 | 48 | 257 | −209 | |

Source: 2007 Standings

==== Southern Conference ====
| Pos | Team | Pld | W | L | PF | PA | PD | Qualification |
|---|---|---|---|---|---|---|---|---|
| 1 | Belgrade Vukovi | 7 | 6 | 1 | 197 | 65 | +132 | Semifinals |
| 2 | Novi Sad Dukes | 7 | 5 | 2 | 172 | 111 | +61 | Semifinals |
| 3 | Kragujevac Wild Boars | 7 | 0 | 7 | 72 | 213 | −141 | |

Source: 2007 Standings

==== Final ====
The final game was titled CEFL Bowl II and was held in Ada Ciganlija Stadium in Belgrade on October 27, with the title won by Vukovi after beating the Wolves 28–27 in a dramatic fashion.

Semifinals; October 13–14
S1 | (Serbia) Belgrade Vukovi | 28
N2 | (Austria) CNC Gladiators | 3
N1 | (Hungary) Budapest Wolves | 21
S2 | (Serbia) Novi Sad Dukes | 14

CEFL Bowl II; October 27
S1 | (Serbia) Belgrade Vukovi | 28
N1 | (Hungary) Budapest Wolves | 27

=== 2008 ===
In 2008, the league changed its name from SELAF to Central European Football League. This season, three new teams joined: Bratislava Monarchs, Budapest Cowboys, and Zagreb Thunder, while the Wild Boars did not return. The Cowboys and Thunder joined the Southern Conference, while the Monarchs were placed in the Northern Conference.

==== Northern Conference ====
| Pos | Team | Pld | W | L | PF | PA | PD | Qualification |
|---|---|---|---|---|---|---|---|---|
| 1 | CNC Gladiators | 10 | 9 | 1 | 277 | 121 | +156 | Semifinals |
| 2 | Budapest Wolves | 10 | 5 | 5 | 230 | 203 | +27 | Semifinals |
| 3 | Ljubljana Silverhawks | 10 | 3 | 7 | 125 | 188 | −63 | |
| 4 | Bratislava Monarchs | 10 | 3 | 7 | 145 | 232 | −87 | |

Source: 2008 Standings

==== Southern Conference ====
| Pos | Team | Pld | W | L | PF | PA | PD | Qualification |
|---|---|---|---|---|---|---|---|---|
| 1 | Belgrade Vukovi | 10 | 9 | 1 | 446 | 90 | +356 | Semifinals |
| 2 | Novi Sad Dukes | 10 | 8 | 2 | 188 | 142 | +46 | Semifinals |
| 3 | Budapest Cowboys | 10 | 3 | 7 | 111 | 323 | −212 | |
| 4 | Zagreb Thunder | 10 | 0 | 10 | 91 | 314 | −223 | |

Source: 2008 Standings

==== Final ====
In CEFL Bowl III, the CNC Gladiators beat Vukovi 14–8 at the Football-Zentrum Ravelin in Vienna on October 25.

Semifinals; October 11–12
N1 | (Austria) CNC Gladiators | 28
S2 | (Serbia) Novi Sad Dukes | 21
S1 | (Serbia) Belgrade Vukovi | 21
N2 | (Hungary) Budapest Wolves | 7

CEFL Bowl III; October 25
N1 | (Austria) CNC Gladiators | 14
S1 | (Serbia) Belgrade Vukovi | 8

=== 2009 ===
In the 2009 season, the Cineplexx Blue Devils replaced the non-returning Monarchs, joining a newly formed conference with the Thunder, Vukovi and Wolves. The other conference consisted of the 2008 champions, Gladiators, along with the Cowboys, Dukes and Silverhawks. The season was also a considerable milestone for the league, as multiple league games were televised on Sport Klub.

==== Conference 1 ====
| Pos | Team | Pld | W | L | PF | PA | PD | Qualification |
|---|---|---|---|---|---|---|---|---|
| 1 | Ljubljana Silverhawks | 8 | 5 | 3 | 191 | 158 | +33 | Semifinals |
| 2 | CNC Gladiators | 8 | 3 | 5 | 118 | 219 | −101 | Semifinals |
| 3 | Novi Sad Dukes | 8 | 3 | 5 | 187 | 173 | +14 | |
| 4 | Budapest Cowboys | 8 | 3 | 5 | 182 | 212 | −30 | |

Source: 2009 Standings

==== Conference 2 ====
| Pos | Team | Pld | W | L | PF | PA | PD | Qualification |
|---|---|---|---|---|---|---|---|---|
| 1 | Cineplexx Blue Devils | 8 | 7 | 1 | 343 | 84 | +259 | Semifinals |
| 2 | Belgrade Vukovi | 8 | 7 | 1 | 296 | 167 | +129 | Semifinals |
| 3 | Budapest Wolves | 8 | 4 | 4 | 184 | 130 | +54 | |
| 4 | Zagreb Thunder | 8 | 0 | 8 | 30 | 388 | −358 | |

Source: 2009 Standings

==== Final ====
CEFL Bowl IV was played at Ada Ciganlija Stadium in Belgrade on October 24, with Vukovi reclaiming the title after beating the Blue Devils 39–20.

Semifinals; October 10–11
N1 | (Slovenia) Ljubljana Silverhawks | 13
S2 | (Serbia) Belgrade Vukovi | 28
S1 | (Austria) Cineplexx Blue Devils | 70
N2 | (Austria) CNC Gladiators | 0

CEFL Bowl IV; October 24
S2 | (Serbia) Belgrade Vukovi | 39
S1 | (Austria) Cineplexx Blue Devils | 20

=== 2010 ===
In 2010, following the entry of the Turkish national champion Istanbul Cavaliers and departure of the Cowboys, Gladiators, and Thunder, the CEFL changed its format. The two conferences would be cut down to just one division with the Dukes, Silverhawks, Vukovi, and Wolves, while the Cavaliers were scheduled to face the Blue Devils in the Wild Card, with the winner taking the final playoff spot. However, the 2010 Central European floods prevented the Blue Devils from traveling to Istanbul, giving the Cavaliers an automatic advance to the semifinals.

| Pos | Team | Pld | W | L | PF | PA | PD | Qualification |
|---|---|---|---|---|---|---|---|---|
| 1 | Belgrade Vukovi | 6 | 6 | 0 | 197 | 67 | +130 | Semifinals |
| 2 | Ljubljana Silverhawks | 6 | 4 | 2 | 151 | 85 | +66 | Semifinals |
| 3 | Budapest Wolves | 6 | 2 | 4 | 126 | 121 | +5 | Semifinals |
| 4 | Novi Sad Dukes | 6 | 0 | 6 | 41 | 242 | −201 | |

Source: 2010 Standings

==== Final ====
CEFL Bowl V was played in Ivančna Gorica, Slovenia on July 18, where Vukovi beat the Silverhawks 42–20 to win their third CEFL title.

Wild Card; June 12
WC1 | (Turkey) Istanbul Cavaliers (Note: Game canceled due to the 2010 Central European floods, Cavaliers advance to the next round) | 35
WC2 | (Austria) Cineplexx Blue Devils | 0

Semifinals; July 3
2 | (Slovenia) Ljubljana Silverhawks | 31
3 | (Hungary) Budapest Wolves | 14
1 | (Serbia) Belgrade Vukovi | 48
4 | (Turkey) Istanbul Cavaliers | 0

CEFL Bowl V July 18
2 | (Slovenia) Ljubljana Silverhawks | 20
1 | (Serbia) Belgrade Vukovi | 42

=== 2011 ===
The 2011 season saw the departure of the Blue Devils and Dukes. Competition consisted of four teams, which were all national champions of their respective countries.

| Pos | Team | Pld | W | L | PF | PA | PD | Qualification |
|---|---|---|---|---|---|---|---|---|
| 1 | Belgrade Vukovi | 6 | 5 | 1 | 206 | 88 | +118 | CEFL Bowl VI |
| 2 | Budapest Wolves | 6 | 4 | 2 | 156 | 106 | +50 | CEFL Bowl VI |
| 3 | Ljubljana Silverhawks | 6 | 3 | 3 | 154 | 143 | +11 | |
| 4 | Istanbul Cavaliers | 6 | 0 | 6 | 28 | 207 | −179 | |

Source: 2011 Standings

==== Final ====
Vukovi earned their fourth CEFL title after beating the Wolves 34–33. CEFL Bowl VI was played at Margaret Island Athletic Center in Budapest on July 23.

| CEFL Bowl VI; July 23 |
| (Hungary) Budapest Wolves | 33 |
| (Serbia) Belgrade Vukovi | 34 |

=== 2012 ===
In 2012, the Zagreb Patriots joined the league and the Blue Devils rejoined, while the Cavaliers folded. The league was renamed to Sport Klub CEFL after its main sponsor.

| Pos | Team | Pld | W | L | PF | PA | PD | Qualification |
|---|---|---|---|---|---|---|---|---|
| 1 | Belgrade SBB Vukovi | 6 | 6 | 0 | 225 | 92 | +133 | Semifinals |
| 2 | Ljubljana Silverhawks | 6 | 5 | 1 | 220 | 66 | +154 | Semifinals |
| 3 | Cineplexx Blue Devils | 6 | 2 | 4 | 99 | 168 | −69 | Semifinals |
| 4 | Budapest Docler Wolves | 6 | 2 | 4 | 160 | 204 | −44 | Semifinals |
| 5 | Zagreb Patriots | 6 | 0 | 6 | 67 | 241 | −174 | |

Source: 2012 Standings

==== Final ====
CEFL Bowl VII was played at Ada Ciganlija Stadium in Belgrade on July 21, where the Silverhawks won their first title after beating Vukovi 34–21.

Semifinals; July 1–7
1 | (Serbia) Belgrade SBB Vukovi | 35
4 | (Hungary) Budapest Docler Wolves | 14
3 | (Austria) Cineplexx Blue Devils | 0
2 | (Slovenia) Ljubljana Silverhawks | 43

CEFL Bowl VII; July 21
1 | (Serbia) Belgrade SBB Vukovi | 21
2 | (Slovenia) Ljubljana Silverhawks | 34

=== 2013 ===
2013 saw the return of the Kragujevac Wild Boars, one of the original inaugural teams. Meanwhile, the Patriots left the league, while the Blue Devils would move down to the new CEFL Cup, bringing the total number of teams back down to four.

| Pos | Team | Pld | W | L | PF | PA | PD | Qualification |
|---|---|---|---|---|---|---|---|---|
| 1 | Belgrade SBB Vukovi | 6 | 6 | 0 | 288 | 110 | +178 | CEFL Bowl VIII |
| 2 | PBB Kragujevac Wild Boars | 6 | 4 | 2 | 195 | 163 | +32 | CEFL Bowl VIII |
| 3 | Ljubljana Silverhawks | 6 | 2 | 4 | 173 | 196 | −23 | |
| 4 | Budapest Docler Wolves | 6 | 0 | 6 | 112 | 299 | −187 | |

Source: 2013 Standings

==== Final ====
CEFL Bowl VIII was held at Ada Ciganlija Stadium in Belgrade on July 7, with Vukovi reclaiming the title after obliterating the Wild Boars 42–0.

| CEFL Bowl VIII; July 7 |
| (Serbia) Belgrade SBB Vukovi | 42 |
| (Serbia) PBB Kragujevac Wild Boars | 0 |

2013 would also introduce the CEFL Cup. Consisting of the Blue Devils and the Belgrade Blue Dragons, the match was played on March 16 at Ada Ciganlija Stadium in Belgrade, where the Blue Devils took down the Blue Dragons 49–26.

| Cup Finals; June 10 |
| (Serbia) Belgrade Blue Dragons | 26 |
| (Austria) Cineplexx Blue Devils | 49 |

=== 2014 ===
The 2014 season saw the return of all four teams from 2013 with no format change within the league. This was the first time in league history that no change occurred between seasons. However, the CEFL Cup would go on hiatus until 2017, with the Blue Devils and Blue Dragons departing from the league.

| Pos | Team | Pld | W | L | PF | PA | PD | Qualification |
|---|---|---|---|---|---|---|---|---|
| 1 | Belgrade SBB Vukovi | 6 | 4 | 2 | 209 | 114 | +95 | CEFL Bowl IX |
| 2 | Ljubljana Silverhawks | 6 | 4 | 2 | 194 | 109 | +85 | CEFL Bowl IX |
| 3 | Kragujevac Wild Boars | 6 | 4 | 2 | 156 | 126 | +30 | |
| 4 | Budapest Docler Wolves | 6 | 0 | 6 | 61 | 271 | −210 | |

Source: 2014 Standings

==== Final ====
CEFL Bowl IX was played in Ivančna Gorica on July 20, where Vukovi won the title beating the Silverhawks 27–17.

| CEFL Bowl IX; July 20 |
| (Slovenia) Ljubljana Silverhawks | 17 |
| (Serbia) Belgrade SBB Vukovi | 27 |

=== 2015 ===
The 2015 season once again held league play with four teams. Belgrade Vukovi and Ljubljana Silverhawks extended their membership, while the Kragujevac Wild Boars and Budapest Docler Wolves departed. In their places, both the Novi Sad Dukes and the Cineplexx Blue Devils rejoined.

| Pos | Team | Pld | W | L | PF | PA | PD | Qualification |
|---|---|---|---|---|---|---|---|---|
| 1 | Novi Sad Dukes | 3 | 2 | 1 | 85 | 52 | +33 | Semifinals: Higher ranked seed |
| 2 | Ljubljana Silverhawks | 3 | 2 | 1 | 93 | 58 | +35 | Semifinals: Higher ranked seed |
| 3 | Belgrade SBB Vukovi | 3 | 2 | 1 | 96 | 75 | +21 | Semifinals: Lower ranked seed |
| 4 | Cineplexx Blue Devils | 3 | 0 | 3 | 50 | 139 | −89 | Semifinals: Lower ranked seed |

Source: 2015 Standings

==== Final ====
CEFL Bowl X was played at FK Kabel stadium in Novi Sad on July 5, with the Dukes hoisting their first trophy after beating Vukovi in a nailbiter 25–23.

Semifinals; June 27–28
1 | (Serbia) Novi Sad Dukes | 35 (Note: Game forfeited due to unknown reasons, Dukes advance to the next round)
4 | (Austria) Cineplexx Blue Devils | 0
3 | (Serbia) Belgrade SBB Vukovi | 21
2 | (Slovenia) Ljubljana Silverhawks | 14

CEFL Bowl X July 5
1 | (Serbia) Novi Sad Dukes | 25
3 | (Serbia) Belgrade SBB Vukovi | 23

=== 2016 ===
The 2016 season marked a major expansion of the CEFL, with 8 new teams joining. The Budapest Cowbells and Zagreb Patriots rejoined the league after respective periods of hiatus. Former teams from the Alpe Adria Football League joined as well, including the Domžale Tigers, Kranj Alp Devils, Niš Imperatori, Inđija Indians, and Sarajevo Spartans. The Graz Giants also joined the league.

==== Western Conference ====
| Pos | Team | Pld | W | L | PF | PA | PD | Qualification |
|---|---|---|---|---|---|---|---|---|
| 1 | Graz Giants | 2 | 2 | 0 | 60 | 20 | +40 | CEFL Bowl XI |
| 2 | Ljubljana Silverhawks | 2 | 1 | 1 | 46 | 35 | +11 | |
| 3 | Cineplexx Blue Devils | 2 | 0 | 2 | 26 | 77 | −51 | |

Source: 2016 Standings

==== Central Conference ====
| Pos | Team | Pld | W | L | PF | PA | PD | Qualification |
|---|---|---|---|---|---|---|---|---|
| 1 | Zagreb Patriots | 6 | 6 | 0 | 212 | 76 | +136 | Semifinals |
| 2 | Kranj Alp Devils | 6 | 3 | 3 | 156 | 131 | +25 | |
| 3 | Sarajevo Spartans | 6 | 3 | 3 | 122 | 154 | −32 | |
| 4 | Domžale Tigers | 6 | 0 | 6 | 99 | 228 | −129 | |

Source: 2016 Standings

==== Eastern Conference ====
| Pos | Team | Pld | W | L | PF | PA | PD | Qualification |
|---|---|---|---|---|---|---|---|---|
| 1 | Belgrade SBB Vukovi | 4 | 4 | 0 | 203 | 64 | +139 | Semifinals |
| 2 | Novi Sad GAT Dukes | 4 | 3 | 1 | 165 | 64 | +101 | |
| 3 | Budapest Cowbells | 4 | 2 | 2 | 148 | 89 | +59 | |
| 4 | Inđija Indians | 4 | 1 | 3 | 35 | 121 | −86 | |
| 5 | Niš Imperatori | 4 | 0 | 4 | 6 | 219 | −213 | |

Source: 2016 Standings

==== Final ====
CEFL Bowl XI was played at ASKÖ Stadium in Graz on July 3, where the Giants claimed the title after beating Vukovi 52–49.

| Semifinals; June 18 | | CEFL Bowl XI; July 3 |
| | | (Austria) Graz Giants | 52 |
| (Serbia) Belgrade SBB Vukovi | 49 | (Serbia) Belgrade SBB Vukovi | 49 |
| (Croatia) Zagreb Patriots | 0 |

=== 2017 ===
The CEFL continued to gain traction as 2017 approached. The Cineplexx Blue Devils, Domžale Tigers, Graz Giants, and Niš Imperatori would not return for the 2017 season, and the Ljubljana Silverhawks would leave for the Austrian Football League, but fall into financial problems two years later and merge with the Tigers. Meanwhile, problems with the IFAF leadership starting in 2016 led to the discontinuation of the IFAF Europe Champions League. Due to this, most of the Northern teams formed the Northern European Football League (NEFL), while some of the other members joined the CEFL, including the Triangle Razorbacks, Panthers Wrocław, and Istanbul Koç Rams. Meanwhile, Swarco Raiders Tirol left the BIG6 and joined the CEFL, too. With all these additions, the CEFL modified their format to consist of two conferences:

- Western Conference: Triangle Razorbacks, Panthers Wrocław, Swarco Raiders Tirol
- Eastern Conference: Belgrade SBB Vukovi, Kragujevac Wild Boars, Budapest Cowbells, Istanbul Koç Rams

==== Western Conference ====
| Pos | Team | Pld | W | L | PF | PA | PD | Qualification |
|---|---|---|---|---|---|---|---|---|
| 1 | Swarco Raiders Tirol | 2 | 2 | 0 | 68 | 20 | +48 | CEFL Bowl XII |
| 2 | Panthers Wrocław | 2 | 1 | 1 | 54 | 47 | +7 | |
| 3 | Triangle Razorbacks | 2 | 0 | 2 | 14 | 69 | −55 | |

Source: 2017 Standings

==== Eastern Conference ====
| Pos | Team | Pld | W | L | PF | PA | PD | Qualification |
|---|---|---|---|---|---|---|---|---|
| 1 | Kragujevac Wild Boars | 2 | 2 | 0 | 71 | 29 | +42 | CEFL Bowl XII |
| 2 | Belgrade SBB Vukovi | 2 | 2 | 0 | 62 | 52 | +10 | |
| 3 | Istanbul Koç Rams | 2 | 0 | 2 | 42 | 56 | −14 | |
| 4 | Budapest Cowbells | 2 | 0 | 2 | 39 | 77 | −38 | |

Source: 2017 Standings

2017 also saw the return of the CEFL Cup. All of the former Central Conference teams from 2016 with the exception of the Tigers were placed in the Western Group. Meanwhile, the Indians and Dukes carried over to play in the Eastern Group, joined by the returning Sirmium Legionaries and Belgrade Blue Dragons. These teams played in two groups as a developmental competition for the main championship:

- Western Group: Kranj Alp Devils, Sarajevo Spartans, Zagreb Patriots
- Eastern Group: Novi Sad GAT Dukes, Inđija Indians, Sirmium Legionaries, Belgrade Blue Dragons

==== Western Group ====
| Pos | Team | Pld | W | L | PF | PA | PD | Qualification |
|---|---|---|---|---|---|---|---|---|
| 1 | Kranj Alp Devils | 4 | 3 | 1 | 90 | 43 | +47 | CEFL Cup Finals |
| 2 | Sarajevo Spartans | 4 | 3 | 1 | 66 | 49 | +17 | CEFL Cup 3rd place matchup |
| 3 | Zagreb Patriots | 4 | 0 | 4 | 26 | 90 | −64 | |

Source: 2017 Standings

==== Eastern Group ====
| Pos | Team | Pld | W | L | PF | PA | PD | Qualification |
|---|---|---|---|---|---|---|---|---|
| 1 | Novi Sad GAT Dukes | 3 | 3 | 0 | 110 | 26 | +84 | CEFL Cup Finals |
| 2 | Belgrade Blue Dragons | 3 | 2 | 1 | 50 | 50 | 0 | CEFL Cup 3rd place matchup |
| 3 | Inđija Indians | 3 | 1 | 2 | 20 | 53 | −33 | |
| 4 | Sirmium Legionaries | 3 | 0 | 3 | 25 | 76 | −51 | |

Source: 2017 Standings

==== Final ====
CEFL Bowl XII was played at Tivoli Stadion Tirol in Innsbruck on June 10, where Raiders Tirol overpowered the Wild Boars 55–20.

| CEFL Bowl XII; June 10 |
| (Austria) Swarco Raiders Tirol | 55 |
| (Serbia) Kragujevac Wild Boars | 20 |

CEFL Cup Finals were played the same day at FC Naklo in Kranj, where the Kranj Alp Devils were shutout by the Dukes 0–59. In addition, the Blue Dragons took home third after taking down the Spartans 14–0.

Cup Finals; June 10
(Slovenia) Kranj Alp Devils | 0
(Serbia) Novi Sad GAT Dukes | 59
Third place
(Bosnia and Herzegovina) Sarajevo Spartans | 0
(Serbia) Belgrade Blue Dragons | 14

=== 2018 ===
2018 marked another prominent season in the league's existence. The Razorbacks left the league after one season, being replaced by the Prague Black Panthers. Both the Cowbells and Vukovi moved to the CEFL Cup and were replaced by the Moscow Patriots, making both conferences equal in number.

==== Western Conference ====
| Pos | Team | Pld | W | L | PF | PA | PD | Qualification |
|---|---|---|---|---|---|---|---|---|
| 1 | Swarco Raiders Tirol | 2 | 2 | 0 | 107 | 42 | +65 | CEFL Bowl XIII |
| 2 | Panthers Wrocław | 2 | 1 | 1 | 60 | 85 | −25 | |
| 3 | Prague Black Panthers | 2 | 0 | 2 | 43 | 83 | −40 | |

Source: 2018 Standings

==== Eastern Conference ====
| Pos | Team | Pld | W | L | PF | PA | PD | Qualification |
|---|---|---|---|---|---|---|---|---|
| 1 | Istanbul Koç Rams | 2 | 2 | 0 | 108 | 62 | +46 | CEFL Bowl XIII |
| 2 | Kragujevac Wild Boars | 2 | 1 | 1 | 75 | 67 | +8 | |
| 3 | Moscow Patriots | 2 | 0 | 2 | 41 | 95 | −54 | |

Source: 2018 Standings

Following the end of the 2017 season, all of the former CEFL Cup teams left the league. Due to this, the CEFL Cup was reformatted to be a knockout bracket. Both the Cowbells and Vukovi moved to the CEFL Cup, joined by the Gdynia Seahawks and Sakarya Tatankalari.

==== Final ====
CEFL Bowl XIII was played at Tivoli Stadion Tirol in Innsbruck on June 9, where the Swarco Raiders defended their title beating the Rams 49–20.

| CEFL Bowl XIII; June 9 |
| (Austria) Swarco Raiders Tirol | 49 |
| (Turkey) Istanbul Koç Rams | 20 |

CEFL Cup Finals took place the following day at BASK Stadium in Belgrade, where Vukovi beat the Seahawks 55–41.

Cup Semifinals; April 29, May 12
(Serbia) Belgrade SBB Vukovi | 56
(Turkey) Sakarya Tatankalari | 28
(Poland) Gdynia Seahawks | 28
(Hungary) Budapest Cowbells | 18

Cup Finals; June 10
(Serbia) Belgrade SBB Vukovi | 55
(Poland) Gdynia Seahawks | 41

A new championship match was put together following the creation of the Northern European Football League. Titled the Superfinal, the game between the CEFL and NEFL champions was played on June 30 at Gentofte Sportspark in Copenhagen, where the Swarco Raiders beat the Copenhagen Towers 45–20 to claim the title.

| Superfinal; June 30 |
| (Denmark) Copenhagen Towers | 20 |
| (Austria) Swarco Raiders Tirol | 45 |

=== 2019 ===
2019 saw a major shift in both conferences of the CEFL Championship. The Patriots would carry over to the CEFL Cup, while the Black Panthers left the league. Panthers Wrocław, a long-time team in the Western Conference, would be relocated to the Eastern Conference, joined by the Calanda Broncos. Meanwhile the vacancy left in the Western Conference would be filled by the Thonon Black Panthers and the Milan Seamen. This shift in league structure would bring the Eastern Conference back up to four teams.

==== Western Conference ====
| Pos | Team | Pld | W | L | PF | PA | PD | Qualification |
|---|---|---|---|---|---|---|---|---|
| 1 | Swarco Raiders Tirol | 2 | 2 | 0 | 91 | 30 | +61 | CEFL Bowl XIV |
| 2 | Thonon Black Panthers | 2 | 1 | 1 | 49 | 48 | +1 | |
| 3 | Milan Seamen | 2 | 0 | 2 | 30 | 92 | −62 | |

Source: 2019 Standings

==== Eastern Conference ====
| Pos | Team | Pld | W | L | PF | PA | PD | Qualification |
|---|---|---|---|---|---|---|---|---|
| 1 | Calanda Broncos | 3 | 3 | 0 | 119 | 53 | +66 | CEFL Bowl XIV |
| 2 | Panthers Wrocław | 3 | 2 | 1 | 128 | 47 | +81 | |
| 3 | Kragujevac Wild Boars | 3 | 1 | 2 | 99 | 143 | −44 | |
| 4 | Istanbul Koç Rams | 3 | 0 | 3 | 60 | 163 | −103 | |

Source: 2019 Standings

The 2019 season would have the CEFL Cup doubling its membership to eight teams, expanding the knockout bracket to include a quarterfinal stage. Although the Seahawks and Tatankalari would depart from the league after just one season, the Budapest Wolves would return after a five year hiatus and the Moscow Patriots would jump down to the Cup after competing in the CEFL Championship in 2018. Joining the Wolves and Patriots would be the incoming Bolzano Giants, Moscow Spartans, Bucharest Rebels, and Istanbul İTÜ Hornets.

==== Final ====
CEFL Bowl XIV was played at Sportplatz Ringstrasse in Chur on June 8 between the Broncos and Swarco Raiders. The win went to the Swarco Raiders in the final seconds, 46–42.

| CEFL Bowl XIV; June 8 |
| (Switzerland) Calanda Broncos | 42 |
| (Austria) Swarco Raiders Tirol | 46 |

Following CEFL Bowl XIV, the Spartans would outlast the Giants 15–14 in an exciting showdown on June 9.

Cup Quarterfinals; April 13
(Romania) Bucharest Rebels | 14
(Serbia) Belgrade SBB Vukovi | 28
(Italy) Bolzano Giants | 36
(Hungary) Budapest Wolves | 19
(Turkey) Istanbul İTÜ Hornets | 40
(Russia) Moscow Patriots | 19
(Hungary) Budapest Cowbells | 6
(Russia) Moscow Spartans | 24

Cup Semifinals; May 11–18
(Serbia) Belgrade SBB Vukovi | 27
(Italy) Bolzano Giants | 42
(Turkey) Istanbul İTÜ Hornets | 17
(Russia) Moscow Spartans | 43

Cup Finals; June 9
(Italy) Bolzano Giants | 14
(Russia) Moscow Spartans | 15

The ECTC Final, a successor of the Superfinal, was played at Tivoli Stadion Tirol in Innsbruck, where the Swarco Raiders and Vienna Vikings, two Austrian Football League rivals, faced off. The game would go to the Swarco Raiders after crushing the Vikings 35–10.

| ECTC Final; June 29 |
| (Austria) Swarco Raiders Tirol | 35 |
| (Austria) Dacia Vienna Vikings | 10 |

=== 2020 ===
2020 would bring major changes to the CEFL. Most notably, the league would ditch its round-robin format in favor of a knockout bracket with wild card matches. The Spartans would move from the Cup to join the Championship, joined by the incoming Badalona Dracs, Copenhagen Towers, Dacia Vienna Vikings, and Stockholm Mean Machines. The season was ultimately cancelled due to the COVID-19 pandemic.

Round 1 April 11–25
(Italy) Milan Seamen
(Russia) Moscow Spartans
(Turkey) Istanbul Koç Rams
(Serbia) Kragujevac Wild Boars
(Denmark) Copenhagen Towers
(Sweden) Stockholm Mean Machines
(France) Thonon Black Panthers
(Spain) Badalona Dracs

Round 2 May 9–10
(Austria) Swarco Raiders Tirol
(Austria) Dacia Vienna Vikings
(Poland) Panthers Wrocław
(Switzerland) Calanda Broncos

Semifinals; June 6

Finals; June 27

Similarly, the CEFL Cup was staged to be a knockout stage tournament. The Spartans would move to the Championship, and the Hornets, Patriots, and Rebels would not return for the 2020 season, instead being replaced by the Fehérvár Enthroners, Geneva Seahawks, La Courneuve Flash, and London Warriors. Like the Championship however, the Cup was ultimately cancelled due to the pandemic.

Cup Quarterfinals; May 9
(England) London Warriors
(France) La Courneuve Flash
(Switzerland) Geneva Seahawks
(Italy) Bolzano Giants
(Austria) Projekt Spielberg Graz Giants
(Hungary) Fehervar Enthroners
(Serbia) Belgrade SBB Vukovi
(Hungary) Budapest Wolves

Cup Semifinals

Cup Finals

=== 2021 ===
After taking 2020 off due to the COVID-19 pandemic, the CEFL announced its return for 2021. The CEFL Cup was once again suspended following 2020, with the league focusing on just one competition for the time being. Although the Rams, Panthers, and Mean Machines would depart after 2020, the CEFL welcomed the Carlstad Crusaders and Schwäbisch Hall Unicorns. The tournament was initially supposed to feature 11 teams from 10 countries, including 8 national champions.

Round 1
(Serbia) Kragujevac Wild Boars
(Russia) Moscow Spartans
(Denmark) Copenhagen Towers
(Sweden) Carlstad Crusaders
(France) Thonon Black Panthers
(Spain) Badalona Dracs

Round 2
(Italy) Milan Seamen
(Austria) Swarco Raiders Tirol
(Austria) Dacia Vienna Vikings
(Germany) Schwäbisch Hall Unicorns
(Switzerland) Calanda Broncos

Semifinals

CEFL Bowl XV

However, pandemic lockdowns forced the Spartans, Towers, Black Panthers, and Dracs to withdraw. Due to this, the Fehérvár Enthroners agreed to join the league while the CEFL decided to commence the tournament with only 8 teams. The Unicorns won the title for the first time after dominating the Swarco Raiders with a last second victory 22–16.

Quarterfinals; May 15–29
(Austria) Swarco Raiders Tirol | 41
(Italy) Milan Seamen | 14
(Austria) Dacia Vienna Vikings | 82
(Serbia) Kragujevac Wild Boars | 7
(Germany) Schwäbisch Hall Unicorns | 35 (Note: Game was cancelled because of travel issues due to the COVID-19 pandemic)
(Sweden) Carlstad Crusaders | 0
(Switzerland) Calanda Broncos | 35
(Hungary) Fehervar Enthroners | 0

Semifinals; May 29–June 13
(Austria) Swarco Raiders Tirol | 20
(Austria) Dacia Vienna Vikings | 13
(Germany) Schwäbisch Hall Unicorns (Note: Host changed because of travel issues due to the COVID-19 pandemic) | 35
(Switzerland) Calanda Broncos | 21

CEFL Bowl XV; June 26
(Austria) Swarco Raiders Tirol | 16
(Germany) Schwäbisch Hall Unicorns | 22

Source: european-league.com

=== 2022 ===
On December 22, 2021, the CEFL announced that the 2022 season would restore the original four round tournament format. Thirteen teams were invited, with nine national champions among the invitations including the defending CEFL Champions. Although the league would see the departure of the Crusaders, Seamen, Swarco Raiders, and Vikings, long-time veterans Belgrade SBB Vukovi and Budapest Wolves would return to the league after a short hiatus, joined by the E-R Parma Panthers, Flash de La Courneuve, LG OLED Las Rozas Black Demons, Örebro Black Knights, and Vienna Danube Dragons. The Unicorns would defend their title after beating the Panthers 42–17.

Wild Card; April 2, April 23
(Denmark) Copenhagen Towers | 25
(Sweden) Örebro Black Knights | 56
(France) Thonon Black Panthers | 12
(Spain) LG OLED Las Rozas Black Demons | 6
(Spain) Badalona Dracs | 7
(France) Flash de La Courneuve | 49
(Hungary) Budapest Wolves | 35 (Note: Game canceled due to the 2022 Russian invasion of Ukraine, Wolves advance to the next round)
(Russia) Moscow Spartans | 0
(Serbia) Belgrade SBB Vukovi | 21
(Austria) Vienna Danube Dragons | 35

Quarterfinals; May 7, May 14
(Germany) Schwäbisch Hall Unicorns | 58
(Sweden) Örebro Black Knights | 7
(France) Thonon Black Panthers | 27
(France) Flash de La Courneuve | 45
(Switzerland) Calanda Broncos | 35
(Hungary) Budapest Wolves | 28
(Italy) E-R Parma Panthers | 21
(Austria) Vienna Danube Dragons | 10

Semifinals; June 4
(Germany) Schwäbisch Hall Unicorns | 35
(France) Flash de La Courneuve | 21
(Switzerland) Calanda Broncos | 9
(Italy) E-R Parma Panthers | 21

CEFL Bowl XVI; June 25
(Germany) Schwäbisch Hall Unicorns | 42
(Italy) E-R Parma Panthers | 17

The CEFL Cup also returned after taking 2021 off, reintroducing its round-robin format with two groups. The Enthroners would return to the Cup, joined by four new teams: Banat Bulls, Prague Lions, Tychy Falcons, and Vysočina Gladiators, though the Bulls later withdrew before the season began. The Kragujevac Wild Boars moved over to the Cup after competing in the Championship in 2021.

==== Northern Group ====
| Pos | Team | Pld | W | L | PF | PA | PD | Qualification |
|---|---|---|---|---|---|---|---|---|
| 1 | Prague Lions | 2 | 2 | 0 | 63 | 39 | +24 | CEFL Cup Finals |
| 2 | Tychy Falcons | 2 | 1 | 1 | 56 | 35 | +21 | |
| 3 | Vysočina Gladiators | 2 | 0 | 2 | 26 | 71 | −45 | |

Source: 2022 Standings

==== Southern Group ====
| Pos | Team | Pld | W | L | PF | PA | PD | Qualification |
|---|---|---|---|---|---|---|---|---|
| 1 | Fehervar Enthroners | 1 | 1 | 0 | 34 | 12 | +22 | CEFL Cup Finals |
| 2 | Kragujevac Wild Boars | 1 | 0 | 1 | 12 | 34 | −22 | |
| 3 | Banat Bulls | 0 | 0 | 0 | 0 | 0 | 0 | Withdrew |

Source: 2022 Standings

==== Final ====
The Cup Final was held at First Field in Székesfehérvár, with the Lions topping the Enthroners in a close matchup 24–20.

| Cup Finals; July 23 |
| (Hungary) Fehervar Enthroners | 20 |
| (Czech Republic) Prague Lions | 24 |

=== 2023 ===
The 2023 season saw twelve teams entering the competition. The Black Knights, Dracs, Dragons, Spartans, and Towers would not return this season, being replaced by the Kuopio Steelers, Madrid Osos Rivas, Otel Guelfi Florence, and the returning Stockholm Mean Machines. The two French clubs would make it to the final, with the Flash succeeding with a 26–21 victory over the Black Panthers.

Wild Card; April 22–30
(Spain) LG OLED Las Rozas Black Demons | 22
(Spain) Madrid Osos Rivas | 13
(Serbia) Belgrade SBB Vukovi | 48
(Hungary) Budapest Wolves | 38
(Sweden) Stockholm Mean Machines | 31
(Finland) Kuopio Steelers | 28
(Switzerland) Calanda Broncos | 35
(France) Thonon Black Panthers | 38

Quarterfinals; May 13
(France) Flash de La Courneuve | 25
(Spain) LG OLED Las Rozas Black Demons | 14
(Italy) E-R Parma Panthers | 28
(Serbia) Belgrade SBB Vukovi | 10
(Germany) Schwäbisch Hall Unicorns | 29
(Sweden) Stockholm Mean Machines | 27
(Italy) Otel Guelfi Florence | 14
(France) Thonon Black Panthers | 27

Semifinals; June 3
(France) Flash de La Courneuve | 26
(Italy) E-R Parma Panthers | 21
(Germany) Schwäbisch Hall Unicorns | 14
(France) Thonon Black Panthers | 42

CEFL Bowl XVII; June 24
(France) Flash de La Courneuve | 26
(France) Thonon Black Panthers | 21

The CEFL Cup would once again ditch its round-robin format in favor of a knockout bracket. The Bucharest Rebels and Budapest Wolves would return to the Cup, while the Enthroners, Falcons, and Lions left the league. The Cup Finals were held in Donja Trnava, where the Wild Boars conquered the Wolves in the final 51–45. 2023 would mark the last official season of the CEFL Cup.

Cup Semifinals; April 22, May 13
(Serbia) Kragujevac Wild Boars | 49
(Czech Republic) Vysočina Gladiators | 33
(Hungary) Budapest Wolves | 45
(Romania) Bucharest Rebels | 6

Cup Finals; June 3
(Serbia) Kragujevac Wild Boars | 51
(Hungary) Budapest Wolves | 45

=== 2024 ===
The 2024 season would unfold with little change in league structure. Once again, twelve teams entered the competition. The Unicorns, one of the top teams in the league, would not return following 2023, joining the Black Demons, Osos Rivas, Steelers, and Wolves. In response, the league welcomed the Manchester Titans along with the returning Copenhagen Towers, Danube Dragons Vienna, and Thalheim Graz Giants. Following the dissolution of the CEFL Cup, the Kragujevac Wild Boars would also return to the Championship. CEFL Bowl XVIII was played at Obere Au in Chur, where the Dragons defeated the Broncos 27–14.

Wild Card; April 20
(Sweden) Stockholm Mean Machines | 42
(England) Manchester Titans | 14
(Switzerland) Calanda Broncos | 33
(Denmark) Copenhagen Towers | 10
(Austria) Thalheim Graz Giants | 21
(Serbia) Kragujevac Wild Boars | 6
(Italy) Guelfi Firenze | 37
(Serbia) Belgrade SBB Vukovi | 27

Quarterfinals; May 11
(France) Flash de La Courneuve | 34
(Sweden) Stockholm Mean Machines | 33
(Italy) Parma Panthers | 20
(Switzerland) Calanda Broncos | 34
(France) Thonon Black Panthers | 30
(Austria) Thalheim Graz Giants | 6
(Austria) Danube Dragons Vienna | 45
(Italy) Guelfi Firenze | 20

Semifinals; June 1
(France) Flash de La Courneuve | 0
(Switzerland) Calanda Broncos | 14
(France) Thonon Black Panthers | 7
(Austria) Danube Dragons Vienna | 12

CEFL Bowl XVIII; June 22
(Switzerland) Calanda Broncos | 14
(Austria) Danube Dragons Vienna | 27

=== 2025 ===
The 2025 season would have major change within the league. The reigning CEFL champs, the Dragons, would make their exit from the league, along with the Flash, Giants, Guelfi, Panthers, Titans, and Towers. These teams were replaced by the Amsterdam Crusaders, Bristol Aztecs, Eidsvoll 1814's, Warsaw Eagles and the returning Badalona Dracs, Carlstad Crusaders, and Schwäbisch Hall Unicorns. The Black Panthers would take home the gold after triumphing over the Broncos in a close battle 28–21.

Wild Card; April 26
(Serbia) Belgrade SBB Vukovi | 12
(Serbia) Kragujevac Wild Boars | 48
(Sweden) Stockholm Mean Machines | 21
(Poland) Warsaw Eagles | 40
(Sweden) Carlstad Crusaders | 37
(Norway) Eidsvoll 1814's | 0
(England) Bristol Aztecs | 46
(Netherlands) Amsterdam Crusaders | 7

Quarterfinals; May 10–11
(Switzerland) Calanda Broncos | 49
(Serbia) Kragujevac Wild Boars | 0
(Germany) Schwäbisch Hall Unicorns | 16
(Poland) Warsaw Eagles | 22
(France) Thonon Black Panthers | 41
(Spain) Badalona Dracs | 17
(Sweden) Carlstad Crusaders | 35
(England) Bristol Aztecs | 0

Semifinals; May 31
(Switzerland) Calanda Broncos | 17
(Poland) Warsaw Eagles | 7
(France) Thonon Black Panthers | 28
(Sweden) Carlstad Crusaders | 26

CEFL Bowl XIX; June 21
(Switzerland) Calanda Broncos | 21
(France) Thonon Black Panthers | 28

=== 2026 ===
The 2026 season would mark the return and departure of many former teams. Namely, the Belgrade SBB Vukovi, a long-time veteran of the league, would depart after rejoining in 2022. In their place came the Belgrade Blue Dragons, a long time CEFL Cup team. In addition, the Guelfi Firenze and Manchester Titans would rejoin the league, making up for the loss of the 1814's, Amsterdam and Carlstad Crusaders, Mean Machines, and Unicorns. In CEFL Bowl XX, the Broncos would get their revenge against the Black Panthers from last year's championship game, dominating them 21–7.

Wild Card; April 25–26
(Serbia) Kragujevac Wild Boars | 21
(Serbia) Belgrade Blue Dragons | 35
(England) Bristol Aztecs | 31
(Northern Ireland) Belfast Trojans | 0

Quarterfinals; May 16
(France) Thonon Black Panthers | 55
(England) Manchester Titans | 8
(Italy) Guelfi Firenze | 55
(Serbia) Belgrade Blue Dragons | 7
(Switzerland) Calanda Broncos | 48
(Spain) Badalona Dracs | 24
(Poland) Warsaw Eagles | 35
(England) Bristol Aztecs | 21

Semifinals; June 6
(France) Thonon Black Panthers | 45
(Italy) Guelfi Firenze | 41
(Switzerland) Calanda Broncos | 22
(Poland) Warsaw Eagles | 10

CEFL Bowl XX; June 27
(France) Thonon Black Panthers | 7
(Switzerland) Calanda Broncos | 21

== CEFL Bowls ==
| Year | | Host city | Home | Result | Visitor | MVP (winning team player) |
|---|---|---|---|---|---|---|
| 2006 | SELAF Bowl I | (Serbia) Belgrade | (Serbia) Belgrade Vukovi | 12–23 | (Serbia) Kragujevac Wild Boars | Marko Obradović |
| 2007 | SELAF Bowl II | (Serbia) Belgrade | (Serbia) Belgrade Vukovi | 28–27 | (Hungary) Budapest Wolves | Pavle Tasić |
| 2008 | CEFL Bowl III | (Austria) Vienna | (Austria) CNC Gladiators | 14–8 | (Serbia) Belgrade Vukovi | Peter de Gouw |
| 2009 | CEFL Bowl IV | (Serbia) Belgrade | (Serbia) Belgrade Vukovi | 39–20 | (Austria) Cineplexx Blue Devils | Jordan Green |
| 2010 | CEFL Bowl V | (Slovenia) Ivančna Gorica | (Slovenia) Ljubljana Silverhawks | 20–42 | (Serbia) Belgrade Vukovi | Brandon McDowell |
| 2011 | CEFL Bowl VI | (Hungary) Budapest | (Hungary) Budapest Wolves | 33–34 | (Serbia) Belgrade Vukovi | Vinnie Miroth |
| 2012 | CEFL Bowl VII | (Serbia) Belgrade | (Serbia) Belgrade SBB Vukovi | 21–34 | (Slovenia) Ljubljana Silverhawks | Anthony Gardner |
| 2013 | CEFL Bowl VIII | (Serbia) Belgrade | (Serbia) Belgrade SBB Vukovi | 42–0 | (Serbia) PBB Kragujevac Wild Boars | Mihailo Josović |
| 2014 | CEFL Bowl IX | (Slovenia) Ivančna Gorica | (Slovenia) Ljubljana Silverhawks | 17–27 | (Serbia) Belgrade SBB Vukovi | Shaun Rutherford |
| 2015 | CEFL Bowl X | (Serbia) Novi Sad | (Serbia) Novi Sad Dukes | 25–23 | (Serbia) Belgrade SBB Vukovi | William Powell |
| 2016 | CEFL Bowl XI | (Austria) Graz | (Austria) Graz Giants | 52–49 | (Serbia) Belgrade SBB Vukovi | Moritz Profant |
| 2017 | CEFL Bowl XII | (Austria) Innsbruck | (Austria) Swarco Raiders Tirol | 55–20 | (Serbia) Kragujevac Wild Boars | Sean Shelton |
| 2018 | CEFL Bowl XIII | (Austria) Innsbruck | (Austria) Swarco Raiders Tirol | 49–20 | (Turkey) Istanbul Koç Rams | Fabian Seeber |
| 2019 | CEFL Bowl XIV | (Switzerland) Chur | (Switzerland) Calanda Broncos | 42–46 | (Austria) Swarco Raiders Tirol | Darius Saint-Robinson |
| 2021 | CEFL Bowl XV | (Austria) Innsbruck | (Austria) Swarco Raiders Tirol | 16–22 | (Germany) Schwäbisch Hall Unicorns | Tyler Rutenbeck |
| 2022 | CEFL Bowl XVI | (Germany) Schwäbisch Hall | (Germany) Schwäbisch Hall Unicorns | 42–17 | (Italy) E-R Parma Panthers | Tyler Rutenbeck |
| 2023 | CEFL Bowl XVII | (France) La Courneuve | (France) Flash de La Courneuve | 26–21 | (France) Thonon Black Panthers | Angelo Druck |
| 2024 | CEFL Bowl XVIII | (Switzerland) Chur | (Switzerland) Calanda Broncos | 14–27 | (Austria) Danube Dragons Vienna | Paul Schachner |
| 2025 | CEFL Bowl XIX | (Switzerland) Chur | (Switzerland) Calanda Broncos | 21–28 | (France) Thonon Black Panthers | Adel Bafdile |
| 2026 | CEFL Bowl XX | (France) Thonon-les-Bains | (France) Thonon Black Panthers | 7–21 | (Switzerland) Calanda Broncos | Robin Sennrich |

== CEFL Cups ==
| Year | | Host city | Home | Result | Visitor |
|---|---|---|---|---|---|
| 2013 | CEFL Cup I | (Serbia) Belgrade | (Serbia) Belgrade Blue Dragons | 26–49 | (Austria) Cineplexx Blue Devils |
| 2017 | CEFL Cup II | (Slovenia) Kranj | (Slovenia) Kranj Alp Devils | 0–59 | (Serbia) Novi Sad GAT Dukes |
| 2018 | CEFL Cup III | (Serbia) Belgrade | (Serbia) Belgrade SBB Vukovi | 55–41 | (Poland) Gdynia Seahawks |
| 2019 | CEFL Cup IV | (Italy) Bolzano | (Italy) Bolzano Giants | 14–15 | (Russia) Moscow Spartans |
| 2022 | CEFL Cup V | (Hungary) Székesfehérvár | (Hungary) Fehervar Enthroners | 20–24 | (Czech Republic) Prague Lions |
| 2023 | CEFL Cup VI | (Serbia) Donja Trnava | (Serbia) Kragujevac Wild Boars | 51–45 | (Hungary) Budapest Wolves |

== Finalists ==
=== Championship finalists ===
| Rank | Team | Titles | Appearances | Years won | Years runner-up |
|---|---|---|---|---|---|
| 1 | (Serbia) Belgrade SBB Vukovi | 6 | 11 | 2007, 2009–2011, 2013, 2014 | 2006, 2008, 2012, 2015, 2016 |
| 2 | (Austria) Swarco Raiders Tirol | 3 | 4 | 2017–2019 | 2021 |
| 3 | (Germany) Schwäbisch Hall Unicorns | 2 | 2 | 2021, 2022 | — |
| 4 | (Switzerland) Calanda Broncos | 1 | 4 | 2026 | 2019, 2024, 2025 |
| 5 | (France) Thonon Black Panthers | 1 | 3 | 2025 | 2023, 2026 |
| 5 | (Slovenia) Ljubljana Silverhawks | 1 | 3 | 2012 | 2010, 2014 |
| 5 | (Serbia) Kragujevac Wild Boars | 1 | 3 | 2006 | 2013, 2017 |
| 8 | (Austria) Danube Dragons Vienna | 1 | 1 | 2024 | — |
| 8 | (France) Flash de La Courneuve | 1 | 1 | 2023 | — |
| 8 | (Austria) Thalheim Graz Giants | 1 | 1 | 2016 | — |
| 8 | (Serbia) Novi Sad GAT Dukes | 1 | 1 | 2015 | — |
| 8 | (Austria) CNC Gladiators | 1 | 1 | 2008 | — |
| 13 | (Hungary) Budapest Wolves | 0 | 2 | — | 2007, 2011 |
| 14 | (Italy) Parma Panthers | 0 | 1 | — | 2022 |
| 14 | (Turkey) Istanbul Koç Rams | 0 | 1 | — | 2018 |
| 14 | (Austria) Cineplexx Blue Devils | 0 | 1 | — | 2009 |

=== By country ===
| Championships | Country | Year |
|---|---|---|
| 8 | Serbia | 2006, 2007, 2009, 2010, 2011, 2013, 2014, 2015 |
| 6 | Austria | 2008, 2016, 2017, 2018, 2019, 2024 |
| 2 | France | 2023, 2025 |
| 2 | Germany | 2021, 2022 |
| 1 | Switzerland | 2026 |
| 1 | Slovenia | 2012 |

=== Cup finalists ===
| Rank | Team | Titles | Appearances | Years won | Years runner-up |
|---|---|---|---|---|---|
| 1 | (Serbia) Kragujevac Wild Boars | 1 | 1 | 2023 | — |
| 1 | (Czech Republic) Prague Lions | 1 | 1 | 2022 | — |
| 1 | (Russia) Moscow Spartans | 1 | 1 | 2019 | — |
| 1 | (Serbia) Belgrade SBB Vukovi | 1 | 1 | 2018 | — |
| 1 | (Serbia) Novi Sad GAT Dukes | 1 | 1 | 2017 | — |
| 1 | (Austria) Cineplexx Blue Devils | 1 | 1 | 2013 | — |
| 7 | (Hungary) Budapest Wolves | 0 | 1 | — | 2023 |
| 7 | (Hungary) Fehervar Enthroners | 0 | 1 | — | 2022 |
| 7 | (Italy) Bolzano Giants | 0 | 1 | — | 2019 |
| 7 | (Poland) Gdynia Seahawks | 0 | 1 | — | 2018 |
| 7 | (Slovenia) Kranj Alp Devils | 0 | 1 | — | 2017 |
| 7 | (Serbia) Belgrade Blue Dragons | 0 | 1 | — | 2013 |

=== By country ===
| Championships | Country | Year |
|---|---|---|
| 3 | Serbia | 2017, 2018, 2023 |
| 1 | Czech Republic | 2022 |
| 1 | Russia | 2019 |
| 1 | Austria | 2013 |

== Membership of CEFL Championship ==
| Team | Nat | Seasons | 2006 | 2007 | 2008 | 2009 | 2010 | 2011 | 2012 | 2013 | 2014 | 2015 | 2016 | 2017 | 2018 | 2019 | 2020 | 2021 | 2022 | 2023 | 2024 | 2025 | 2026 |
|---|---|---|---|---|---|---|---|---|---|---|---|---|---|---|---|---|---|---|---|---|---|---|---|
| Belgrade SBB Vukovi | (Serbia) | 2006–2017, 2022–2025 | | | | | | | | | | | | | | | | | | | | | |
| Novi Sad GAT Dukes | (Serbia) | 2006–2010, 2015–2016 | | | | | | | | | | | | | | | | | | | | | |
| **Kragujevac Wild Boars** | (Serbia) | 2006–2007, 2013–2014, 2017–2021, 2024–present | | | | | | | | | | | | | | | | | | | | | |
| Ljubljana Silverhawks | (Slovenia) | 2006–2016 | | | | | | | | | | | | | | | | | | | | | |
| Sirmium Legionaries | (Serbia) | 2006 | | | | | | | | | | | | | | | | | | | | | |
| Budapest Wolves | (Hungary) | 2007–2014, 2022–2023 | | | | | | | | | | | | | | | | | | | | | |
| CNC Gladiators | (Austria) | 2007–2009 | | | | | | | | | | | | | | | | | | | | | |
| Bratislava Monarchs | (Slovakia) | 2008 | | | | | | | | | | | | | | | | | | | | | |
| Budapest Cowbells | (Hungary) | 2008–2009, 2016–2017 | | | | | | | | | | | | | | | | | | | | | |
| Zagreb Thunder | (Croatia) | 2008–2009 | | | | | | | | | | | | | | | | | | | | | |
| Cineplexx Blue Devils | (Austria) | 2009–2010, 2012, 2015–2016 | | | | | | | | | | | | | | | | | | | | | |
| Istanbul Cavaliers | (Turkey) | 2010–2011 | | | | | | | | | | | | | | | | | | | | | |
| Zagreb Patriots | (Croatia) | 2012, 2016 | | | | | | | | | | | | | | | | | | | | | |
| Domžale Tigers | (Slovenia) | 2016 | | | | | | | | | | | | | | | | | | | | | |
| Inđija Indians | (Serbia) | 2016 | | | | | | | | | | | | | | | | | | | | | |
| Kranj Alp Devils | (Slovenia) | 2016 | | | | | | | | | | | | | | | | | | | | | |
| Niš Imperatori | (Serbia) | 2016 | | | | | | | | | | | | | | | | | | | | | |
| Sarajevo Spartans | (Bosnia and Herzegovina) | 2016 | | | | | | | | | | | | | | | | | | | | | |
| Thalheim Graz Giants | (Austria) | 2016, 2024 | | | | | | | | | | | | | | | | | | | | | |
| Istanbul Koç Rams | (Turkey) | 2017–2020 | | | | | | | | | | | | | | | | | | | | | |
| Panthers Wrocław | (Poland) | 2017–2020 | | | | | | | | | | | | | | | | | | | | | |
| Swarco Raiders Tirol | (Austria) | 2017–2021 | | | | | | | | | | | | | | | | | | | | | |
| Triangle Razorbacks | (Denmark) | 2017 | | | | | | | | | | | | | | | | | | | | | |
| Moscow Patriots | (Russia) | 2018 | | | | | | | | | | | | | | | | | | | | | |
| Prague Black Panthers | (Czech Republic) | 2018 | | | | | | | | | | | | | | | | | | | | | |
| **Calanda Broncos** | (Switzerland) | 2019–present | | | | | | | | | | | | | | | | | | | | | |
| Milan Seamen | (Italy) | 2019–2021 | | | | | | | | | | | | | | | | | | | | | |
| **Thonon Black Panthers** | (France) | 2019–present | | | | | | | | | | | | | | | | | | | | | |
| **Badalona Dracs** | (Spain) | 2020–2022, 2025–present | | | | | | | | | | | | | | | | | | | | | |
| Copenhagen Towers | (Denmark) | 2020–2022, 2024 | | | | | | | | | | | | | | | | | | | | | |
| Dacia Vienna Vikings | (Austria) | 2020–2021 | | | | | | | | | | | | | | | | | | | | | |
| Moscow Spartans | (Russia) | 2020–2022 | | | | | | | | | | | | | | | | | | | | | |
| Stockholm Mean Machines | (Sweden) | 2020, 2023–2025 | | | | | | | | | | | | | | | | | | | | | |
| Carlstad Crusaders | (Sweden) | 2021, 2025 | | | | | | | | | | | | | | | | | | | | | |
| Fehervar Enthroners | (Hungary) | 2021 | | | | | | | | | | | | | | | | | | | | | |
| Schwäbisch Hall Unicorns | (Germany) | 2021–2023, 2025 | | | | | | | | | | | | | | | | | | | | | |
| Danube Dragons Vienna | (Austria) | 2022, 2024 | | | | | | | | | | | | | | | | | | | | | |
| Flash de La Courneuve | (France) | 2022–2024 | | | | | | | | | | | | | | | | | | | | | |
| LG OLED Las Rozas Black Demons | (Spain) | 2022–2023 | | | | | | | | | | | | | | | | | | | | | |
| Örebro Black Knights | (Sweden) | 2022 | | | | | | | | | | | | | | | | | | | | | |
| Parma Panthers | (Italy) | 2022–2024 | | | | | | | | | | | | | | | | | | | | | |
| Guelfi Firenze | (Italy) | 2023–2024, 2026 | | | | | | | | | | | | | | | | | | | | | |
| Kuopio Steelers | (Finland) | 2023 | | | | | | | | | | | | | | | | | | | | | |
| Madrid Osos Rivas | (Spain) | 2023 | | | | | | | | | | | | | | | | | | | | | |
| **Manchester Titans** | (England) | 2024, 2026 | | | | | | | | | | | | | | | | | | | | | |
| Amsterdam Crusaders | (Netherlands) | 2025 | | | | | | | | | | | | | | | | | | | | | |
| **Bristol Aztecs** | (England) | 2025–present | | | | | | | | | | | | | | | | | | | | | |
| Eidsvoll 1814's | (Norway) | 2025 | | | | | | | | | | | | | | | | | | | | | |
| Warsaw Eagles | (Poland) | 2025–2026 | | | | | | | | | | | | | | | | | | | | | |
| **Belfast Trojans** | (Northern Ireland) | 2026 | | | | | | | | | | | | | | | | | | | | | |
| **Belgrade Blue Dragons** | (Serbia) | 2026 | | | | | | | | | | | | | | | | | | | | | |

- Note: teams whose names are in **bold** are current participants.

== Membership of CEFL Cup ==
| Team | Nat | Seasons | 2013 | 2014 | 2015 | 2016 | 2017 | 2018 | 2019 | 2020 | 2021 | 2022 | 2023 |
|---|---|---|---|---|---|---|---|---|---|---|---|---|---|
| Belgrade Blue Dragons | (Serbia) | 2013, 2017 | | | | | | | | | | | |
| Cineplexx Blue Devils | (Austria) | 2013 | | | | | | | | | | | |
| Inđija Indians | (Serbia) | 2017 | | | | | | | | | | | |
| Kranj Alp Devils | (Slovenia) | 2017 | | | | | | | | | | | |
| Novi Sad GAT Dukes | (Serbia) | 2017 | | | | | | | | | | | |
| Sarajevo Spartans | (Bosnia and Herzegovina) | 2017 | | | | | | | | | | | |
| Sirmium Legionaries | (Serbia) | 2017 | | | | | | | | | | | |
| Zagreb Patriots | (Croatia) | 2017 | | | | | | | | | | | |
| Belgrade SBB Vukovi | (Serbia) | 2018–2020 | | | | | | | | | | | |
| Budapest Cowbells | (Hungary) | 2018–2019 | | | | | | | | | | | |
| Gdynia Seahawks | (Poland) | 2018 | | | | | | | | | | | |
| Sakarya Tatankalari | (Turkey) | 2018 | | | | | | | | | | | |
| Bolzano Giants | (Italy) | 2019–2020 | | | | | | | | | | | |
| Bucharest Rebels | (Romania) | 2019, 2023 | | | | | | | | | | | |
| Budapest Wolves | (Hungary) | 2019–2020, 2023 | | | | | | | | | | | |
| Istanbul İTÜ Hornets | (Turkey) | 2019 | | | | | | | | | | | |
| Moscow Patriots | (Russia) | 2019 | | | | | | | | | | | |
| Moscow Spartans | (Russia) | 2019 | | | | | | | | | | | |
| Fehervar Enthroners | (Hungary) | 2020, 2022 | | | | | | | | | | | |
| Thalheim Graz Giants | (Austria) | 2020 | | | | | | | | | | | |
| Geneva Seahawks | (Switzerland) | 2020 | | | | | | | | | | | |
| La Courneuve Flash | (France) | 2020 | | | | | | | | | | | |
| London Warriors | (England) | 2020 | | | | | | | | | | | |
| Banat Bulls | (Serbia) | 2022 | | | | | | | | | | | |
| Kragujevac Wild Boars | (Serbia) | 2022–2023 | | | | | | | | | | | |
| Prague Lions | (Czech Republic) | 2022 | | | | | | | | | | | |
| Tychy Falcons | (Poland) | 2022 | | | | | | | | | | | |
| Vysočina Gladiators | (Czech Republic) | 2022–2023 | | | | | | | | | | | |
