= Guelfi Firenze =

Logo

General information
- Founded: 2000; 26 years ago
- Stadium: Guelfi Sports Center
- Headquartered: Florence, Italy
- Colors: Purple, maroon, black, gray
- Website: www.guelfifirenze.it

Personnel
- General manager: Edoardo Cammi

League / conference affiliations
- American Football League Europe; Italian Football League

Championships
- League championships: 3 IFL: 2022, 2025, 2026

The Guelfi Firenze are an American football team that plays in Florence. Since 2016, the club has played in the Italian Football League First Division, winning the championship three times since its founding. In 2026, the team announced their entry into the American Football League Europe, replacing the Firenze Red Lions who parted ways with the league.

== History ==
=== Early years ===
Guelfi Firenze was founded in 2000 by a group of players from the previous Florentine teams, the Apaches and Renegades, who folded in 1994 and 1997, respectively. With little time to prepare for their inaugural season, the Guelfi wore the old Renegades' yellow kit in their debut, before switching to the purple kit they use today.

In their inaugural season, they made it to the Snowbowl, Italy's Second Division final, losing to the Kings Gallarate 30–25. Following this, the team had a brief stint in the Nine League, a 9-a-side football league, winning the Ninebowl in 2003 after defeating Crusaders Cagliari 38–6 in their home stadium.

In 2005, Guelfi would go undefeated and win the Silver Bowl against Briganti Napoli. This success would carry on through the late 2010's, with Guelfi reaching two more finals in 2007 and 2010.

=== Renovations and promotion ===
A series of radical changes between late 2015 and early 2016 presented Guelfi with new challenges and significant results on and off the pitch. Most significantly, the team took a major step to join the First Division of the Italian Football League. To support this transition, Guelfi Sports Center, Guelfi Firenze's home stadium since 2011, underwent extensive renovations, including the installation of a new synthetic turf in preparation for their debut. In their inaugural season within the First Division, Guelfi went 6–4, losing to the Parma Panthers in the playoffs.

=== Championship years and international competition ===
Three years after joining the First Division, Guelfi Firenze made their debut at the Italian Bowl, ultimately falling to the Milano Seamen. However, this marked the beginning of a new era for Guelfi, as they returned to the championship game in 2022, avenging their defeat against the Seamen to claim their first ever title. 2023 and 2024 saw Guelfi lose back to back championships against the Panthers, but in 2025, Guelfi captured their second Italian Bowl title after beating the Ancona Dolphins 49–14 at the Glass Bowl in Toledo, Ohio. Guelfi continued this success, claiming the championship again in 2026 after getting revenge against the Panthers 53–43.

In 2023, Guelfi Firenze were announced as one of the teams participating in the Central European Football League. Despite receiving a bye to the quarter-finals, the team's debut campaign ended after being defeated at home to the Thonon Black Panthers. Nevertheless, Guelfi would return in 2024, securing their first international win in club history with a 37–27 win over the Belgrade Vukovi. The success was short-lived however, as they were once again eliminated in the quarter-finals following a 20–45 defeat to the Danube Dragons. After sitting out the following year, the team rejoined the CEFL, once again receiving a bye to the quarter-finals. This time, they faced the Belgrade Blue Dragons, securing a convincing 55–7 victory to advance to the semi-finals for the first time in club history. However, their run came to an end in the semi-finals as they suffered a narrow 41–45 defeat to the Black Panthers.

=== Move to AFLE and present day ===
On 4 November 2026, Guelfi Firenze announced their entry into the American Football League Europe. The club replaced the departing Firenze Red Lions, who finished the 2026 season winless amid low attendance. Guelfi will continue competing in the IFL while preparing for their AFLE debut, which will follow the conclusion of the 2027 IFL season.

== Season-by-season records ==
=== Domestic ===
Season	League	Finish	Wins	Losses	Postseason	Result	Ref
2000	Winter League	2nd (Central)	5	3	2–1	Lost Snowbowl (Kings) 25–30	
2001	Winter League	2nd (Central)	5	1	0–1	Lost Semi-finals (Kings) 6–12	
2002	Silver League	1st (Central)	4	1	1–1	Lost Silverbowl (Titans) 20–26	
2003	Nine League	1st	6	1	2–0	Won Ninebowl (Crusaders) 38–6	
2004	Serie B	1st (Eastern)	7	1	0–1	Lost Semi-finals (Panthers) 14–18	
2005	Serie B	1st (Group B)	6	0	3–0	Won Silverbowl (Briganti) 47–21	
2006	Serie A2	2nd (Central)	5	2	0–1	Lost Wild card (Corsairs) 0–8	
2007	Serie A2	3rd (Central–Northern)	2	4	3–1	Lost Silverbowl (Hogs) 13–40	
2008	Serie A	2nd (Central)	6	2	0–1	Lost Quarter-finals (Hogs) 9–22	
2009	LENAF	1st (Group A)	8	0	0–1	Lost Semi-finals (Sharks) 12–20	
2010	LENAF	1st (Central)	7	1	2–1	Lost Italian Bowl (Barbari) 12–14	
2011	LENAF	3rd (Central)	7	1	1–1	Lost Quarter-finals (Barbari) 14–21	
2012	LENAF	1st (Central)	8	0	1–1	Lost Semi-finals (Grizzlies) 6–21	
2013	LENAF	1st (Group C)	7	1	1–1	Lost Semi-finals (Lions) 6–27	
2014	Second Division	3rd (Group B)	5	3	Did not qualify		
2015	Second Division	1st (Group B)	8	0	1–1	Lost Semi-finals (Hogs) 20–28	
2016	First Division	3rd (Southern)	6	4	0–1	Lost Quarter-finals (Panthers) 14–35	
2017	First Division	9th	2	8	Did not qualify		
2018	First Division	6th	4	6	0–1	Lost Wild card (Giants) 0–50	
2019	First Division	3rd	6	2	2–1	Lost Italian Bowl (Seamen) 28–62	
2020	First Division	Not held					
2021	First Division	4th	4	4	0–1	Lost Semi-finals (Panthers) 20–55	
2022	First Division	3rd	6	2	3–0	Won Italian Bowl (Seamen) 21–17	
2023	First Division	2nd	7	1	1–1	Lost Italian Bowl (Panthers) 13–29	
2024	First Division	2nd	6	2	1–1	Lost Italian Bowl (Panthers) 26–38	
2025	First Division	1st (Group B)	10	0	2–0	Won Italian Bowl (Dolphins) 49–14	
2026	First Division	1st	8	0	2–0	Won Italian Bowl (Panthers) 53–43	
2027	First Division	TBD	0	0	TBD		

=== International ===
Season	League	Finish	Wins	Losses	Postseason	Result	Ref
2023	CEFL	–	–	–	0–1	Lost Quarter-finals (Black Panthers) 14–27	
2024	CEFL	–	–	–	1–1	Lost Quarter-finals (Dragons) 20–45	
2026	CEFL	–	–	–	1–1	Lost Semi-finals (Black Panthers) 41–45	
2027	AFLE	TBD	0	0	TBD		

=== Youth ===
Season	League	Finish	Wins	Losses	Postseason	Result	Ref
2005	Under 21	4th (Group E)	1	3	Did not qualify		
2006	Under 21	2nd (Group E)	3	1	1–1	Lost Quarter-finals (Warriors) 0–35	
2007	Under 21	2nd (Group A)	2	2	Did not qualify		
2008	Under 23	3rd (Group B)	3	2	Did not qualify		
2009	Under 21	2nd (Central)	4	2	0–1	Lost Quarter-finals (Giants) 6–13	
2010	Under 21	3rd (Central)	4	2	Did not qualify		
2011	Under 21	3rd (Group B)	3	3	0–1	Lost Wild card (Seamen) 14–40	
2012	Under 21	4th (Central)	1	5	Did not qualify		
2013	Under 19	4th (Group B)	1	5	Did not qualify		
2014	Under 19	3rd (Group F)	1	4	Did not qualify		
2015	Under 13	–	4	2	2–0	Won Youth Bowl (Doves) 26–25	
2016	Under 16	3rd (Group C)	3	3	0–1	Lost Wild card (Warriors) 6–16	
2017	Under 16	2nd (Group A)	4	2	0–1	Lost Wild card (Skorpions) 10–36	
