= Sirmium Legionaries =

American football team

The Sirmium Legionaries is the oldest American football team in Serbia, founded in 2002 in Sremska Mitrovica. From its inception the team grew rapidly, becoming one of the most organized and successful clubs in the region.

The city of Sremska Mitrovica (previously Sirmium), the home town of the Legionaries, has historical roots in the Roman period. This led to the club name (they were brave and fearless Roman soldiers).

== History ==
During the 2003 season, the club played only friendly games. First, the National League of Serbia took place in 2004. The Legionaries finished third in the regular season, reaching the playoffs, where they were beaten by Vukovi Beograd. Next year, the National League wasn’t played, but the National Cup was. The Legionaries finished third again, behind the Kragujevac Wild Boars and Vukovi Belgrade.

In 2006 the club entered the regional Southeastern European League of American Football, losing seven games and winning one game in Slovenia. At the end of the season the club won its first trophy – Crobowl in Zagreb, Croatia. The Legionaries beat the Ljubljana Silverhawks in the semifinal and the Trieste Mustangs in the final of the tournament.

In 2007, the team played in the National Championship of Serbia. In that competition the Legionaries finished second in regular season, but lost the semifinal playoff game against the Klek Knights.
