= Northern European Football League =

Former European American football league consisting of teams from the Nordics and England

- Sport: American football
- Founded: 2017; 9 years ago
- First season: 2017
- Folded: 2018; 8 years ago
- Countries: Denmark; England; Finland; Norway; Sweden
- Most titles: (Finland) Helsinki Roosters (Denmark) Copenhagen Towers (1 title)

The Northern European Football League (NEFL) was a short-lived organization involving American football in the Nordic countries and England. The league formed in 2017 following the collapse of the IFAF Europe Champions League in 2016. Former teams of this league rallied together to form the NEFL, eventually forming ties with the Central European Football League. While the league met its end in 2018, many teams would end up joining the CEFL, continuing the NEFL's legacy.

== History ==
=== 2017 ===
The inaugural season of the NEFL featured three former teams of the IFAF Europe Champions League: the Carlstad Crusaders, Copenhagen Towers, and Helsinki Roosters. Joining these teams were the London Warriors from the BAFA National Leagues and the Uppsala 86'ers. The 86'ers and Roosters were placed in Group 1, while the Crusaders, Towers, and Warriors were slotted into Group 2.

==== Group 1 ====
Pos	Team	Pld	W	L	PF	PA	PD	Qualification
1	Helsinki Roosters	2	2	0	89	57	+32	NEFL Final I
2	Uppsala 86'ers	2	0	2	57	89	−32	

Source: 2017 Results

==== Group 2 ====
Pos	Team	Pld	W	L	PF	PA	PD	Qualification
1	Carlstad Crusaders	2	2	0	57	20	+37	NEFL Final I
2	London Warriors	2	1	1	41	58	−17	
3	Copenhagen Towers	2	0	2	34	54	−20	

Source: 2017 Results

==== Final ====
NEFL Final I was held at Sola Arena in Carlstad, where the Roosters would outclass the Crusaders in overtime 21–15.

NEFL Final I May 22
(Sweden) Carlstad Crusaders	15
(Finland) Helsinki Roosters	21

=== 2018 ===
The 2018 season marked the final season of the league's existence. The league ditched its championship game and two conferences in favor of a single conference, with the top team becoming the 2018 champion and qualifying for the Superfinal. The Roosters, NEFL Final I champions, departed from the league due to scheduling conflicts, while the 86'ers and Warriors dropped out to pursue other opportunities, being replaced by the Oslo Vikings and Tamworth Phoenix. The Gdynia Seahawks were also a potential candidate to join the league for 2018, but instead shifted their attention to joining the CEFL Cup. The Copenhagen Towers would take home the gold after going undefeated on the season.

Pos	Team	Pld	W	L	PF	PA	PD	Qualification
1	Copenhagen Towers	3	3	0	115	60	+55	Superfinal
2	Carlstad Crusaders	3	2	1	133	75	+58	
3	Tamworth Phoenix	3	1	2	68	104	−36	
4	Oslo Vikings	3	0	3	47	124	−77	

Source: 2018 Results

==== Final ====
A final matchup colloquially called the Superfinal between the NEFL champion and the CEFL champion, the Swarco Raiders Tirol, was held on June 30 at Gentofte Sportspark in Copenhagen. The Swarco Raiders beat the Towers 45–20, claiming the Superfinal title.

Superfinal; June 30
(Denmark) Copenhagen Towers	20
(Austria) Swarco Raiders Tirol	45

=== Collapse ===
The NEFL since its founding was plagued by the 2015 IFAF leadership division. Legitimacy issues surrounding the ownership of IFAF led to many independent American football leagues in Europe being sanctioned, including the CEFL. This threat, combined with scheduling issues surrounding NEFL teams led to the league's demise following the 2018 season. While the Phoenix and Vikings returned to their respective leagues, the Crusaders and Towers later joined the CEFL, cementing the NEFL as an important cornerstone in the CEFL's development.

== Membership of NEFL ==
Team	Nat	Seasons	2017	2018
Carlstad Crusaders	(Sweden)	2017–2018		
Copenhagen Towers	(Denmark)	2017–2018		
Helsinki Roosters	(Finland)	2017		
London Warriors	(England)	2017		
Uppsala 86'ers	(Sweden)	2017		
Oslo Vikings	(Norway)	2018		
Tamworth Phoenix	(England)	2018		
