= Anthony Ratliff-Williams =

American football player (born 1996)

Örebro Black Knights
- Position: Wide receiver

Personal information
- Born: June 17, 1997 (age 29); Matthews, North Carolina, U.S.
- Listed height: 5 ft 11 in (1.80 m)
- Listed weight: 195 lb (88 kg)

Career information
- High school: David W. Butler (Matthews, North Carolina)
- College: North Carolina (2015–2018)
- NFL draft: 2019: undrafted

Career history
- Tennessee Titans (2019)*; Oakland / Las Vegas Raiders (2019–2020)*; Seattle Seahawks (2021)*; Houston Gamblers / Roughnecks (2022–2024); Örebro Black Knights (2026-present)
- * Offseason or practice squad member only

Awards and highlights
- All-ACC Honorable Mention - Wide Receiver (2018); All-ACC First Team - Specialist (2017); All-ACC Third Team - All-Purpose (2017)
- Stats at Pro Football Reference

Anthony Ratliff-Williams (born June 17, 1997) is an American football wide receiver. He currently plays for the Örebro Black Knights of the Superserien. He played college football at North Carolina.

== Early life ==
Ratliff-WIlliams grew up in Matthews, North Carolina, and attended David W. Butler High School. He played quarterback and passed for 1,783 yards and 25 touchdowns while also rushing for 1,200 yards with 16 touchdowns as a senior. He was named the 15th best player in North Carolina in the class of 2015 and committed to the University of North Carolina.

== College career ==
Ratliff-Williams redshirted his first season at Chapel Hill. As a redshirt freshman, he caught three passes for 21 yards. As a sophomore, he was named First-Team All-ACC as a returner and Third-Team as an all-purpose back. Led the Tar Heels in receptions (35), receiving yards (630) and receiving touchdowns (6). Against the Pittsburgh Panthers, Ratliff-Williams threw a TD pass, returned the opening kickoff, and caught the game winning touchdown. He threw two touchdowns as a sophomore. As a junior, he caught 42 passes for 689 and two TDs. He declared early for the 2019 NFL Draft.

== Professional career ==
Pre-draft measurables
Height	Weight	Arm length	Hand span	40-yard dash	10-yard split	20-yard split	20-yard shuttle	Three-cone drill	Vertical jump	Broad jump	Bench press
6 ft 0 1/5 in (1.83 m)	205 lb (93 kg)	30 3/4 in (0.78 m)	9 1/2 in (0.24 m)	4.57 s	1.60 s	2.56 s	4.38 s	6.90 s	35 in (0.89 m)	10 ft 6 in (3.20 m)	14 reps
All values from Pro Day

=== Tennessee Titans ===
Ratliff-Williams signed with the Tennessee Titans as a UDFA on May 10, 2019. He was released on August 31.

=== Oakland / Las Vegas Raiders ===
He signed with the Oakland Raiders on October 14, 2019. He spent the 2019 and 2020 seasons on the practice squad and was released on August 3, 2020.

=== Seattle Seahawks ===
Ratliff-Williams signed with the Seattle Seahawks on August 10, 2021. He was released on August 16.

=== Houston Gamblers / Roughnecks ===
Ratliff-Williams was drafted by the Houston Gamblers of the United States Football League (USFL) in the 14th round of the 2022 USFL draft. Ratliff-Williams signed with the Houston Gamblers of the United States Football League on May 31, 2022. He caught 28 passes for 243 yards and one touchdown with the Gamblers in 2022. In 2023, he caught 13 passes for 224 yards and three touchdowns. He stayed with the Gamblers when they became the Houston Roughnecks of the United Football League.

=== Örebro Black Knights ===
On February 6th, 2026, Ratliff-Williams signed with the Örebro Black Knights of the Superserien in Sweden.
