= Stockholm Mean Machines =

American football team in Sweden

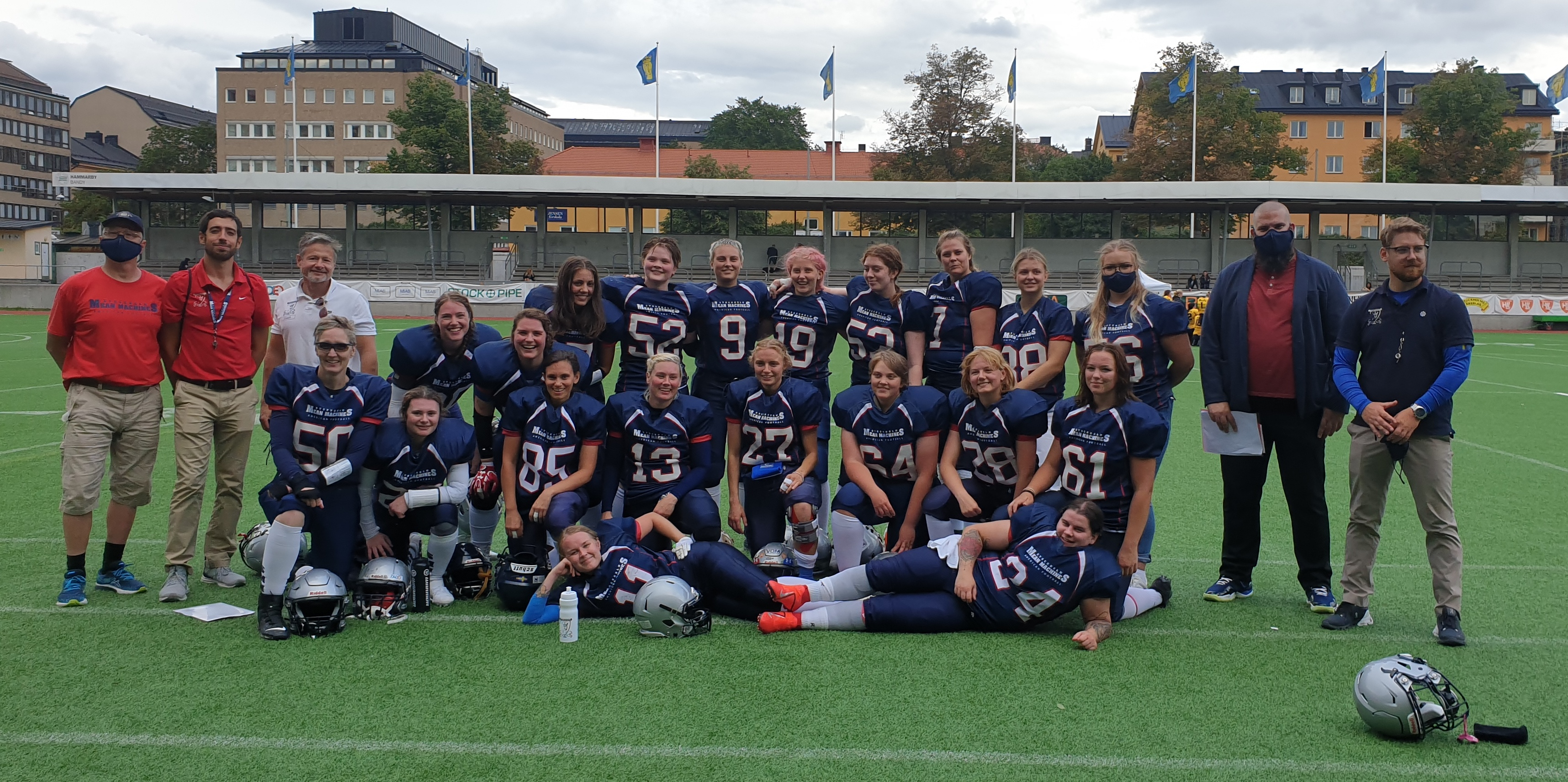
- Mean Machines, 2021
- Founded: 1982
- League: Superserien
- Based in: Stockholm, Sweden
- Stadium: Zinkensdamms IP
- Colors: Blue, red and white
- Championships: 1990, 1997–2000, 2002, 2004–2006, 2008, 2009, 2018, 2019, 2022, 2023
- Website: https://www.meanmachines.se/

The Stockholm Mean Machines is a Swedish American football team based in Stockholm. Founded in 1982, the Mean Machines is the oldest American football team in the country, and also the most successful with a total of 15 national titles.

== History ==
The Mean Machines was founded in 1982 in Danderyd near Stockholm as Danderyd Mean Machines. They lost their first game in the nationals in 1985. Five years later, the Danderyd Mean Machines won their first official national championship.

In 1995, the team changed name to Stockholm Mean Machines. From 1997 to 2000 the Mean Machines won the Superserien four times and became the most successful team in the country. Between 2002 and 2009 they won another six championships. That was followed by a period of eight years when they did not participate in the national finals.

During seasons 2018 and 2019, the Mean Machines won two additional championships, the second one with a perfect season. After two losses in the finals, they won again in 2022, after having enjoyed a perfect season.

== Recent seasons ==
Year	Division	Finish	Points	Pct.	Games	W	D	L	PF	PA	Postseason
2018	Superserien	1st	8–8	0.500	8	4	0	4	238	245	Won SF: Örebro Black Knights (35–14) Won SS: Carlstad Crusaders (42–41)
2019	Superserien	1st	16–0	1.000	8	8	0	0	177	47	Won SF: Örebro Black Knights (31–6) Won SS: Carlstad Crusaders (49–35)
2020	Superserien	1st	10–2	0.833	6	5	0	1	174	75	Won SF: Uppsala 86ers (41–6) Lost SS: Carlstad Crusaders (12–14)
2021	Superserien	3rd	4–2	0.667	3	2	0	1	87	55	Won SF: Carlstad Crusaders (16–14) Lost SS: Örebro Black Knights (14–28)
2022	Superserien	1st	12–0	1.000	6	6	0	0	220	129	Won SF: Tyresö Royal Crowns (35–22) Won SS: Örebro Black Knights (52–8)
2023	Superserien	1st	12–0	1.000	6	6	0	0	177	70	Won SS: Tyresö Royal Crowns (55–35)
2024	Superserien	2nd	12–2	0.857	7	6	0	1	255	113	Won SF: Tyresö Royal Crowns (30–27) Lost SS: Carlstad Crusaders (22–51)
2025	Superserien	6th	8–8	0.500	8	4	0	4	221	234	—
