= Graz Giants =

Austrian gridiron football team

- Founded: 1981
- Based in: Graz, Austria
- Stadium: ASKÖ Stadium (8,500)
- Colors: Blue and Gold
- Championships: AFL 1986, 1987, 1988, 1990, 1991, 1992, 1995, 1997, 1998, 2008, 2026, CEFL 2016, EFAF 2002, 2006, 2007
- Website: https://www.grazgiants.at/

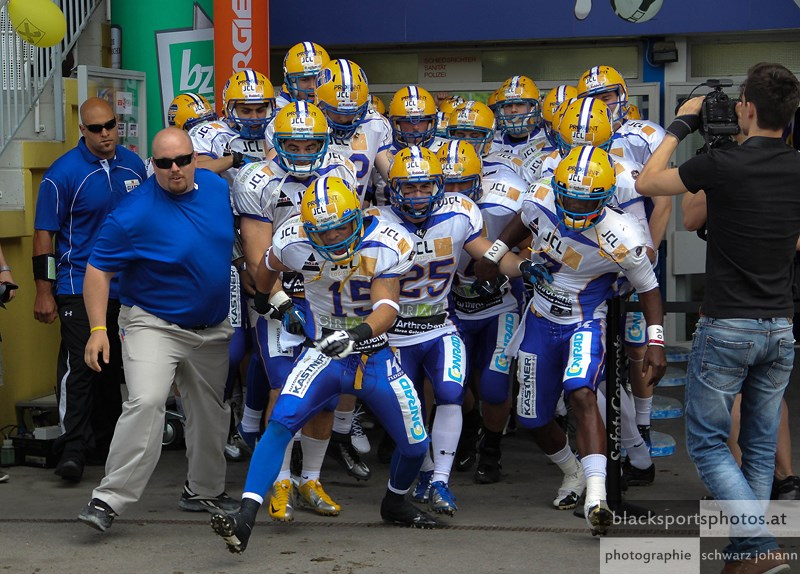

The Graz Giants are an American football team in Graz, Austria, founded in 1981. The Giants play in the Austrian Football League and are ten time Austrian Bowl champions. The Giants home games are at ASKÖ Stadium in the Eggenberg district of Graz.

== History ==
Inspired by a March 1981 broadcast of the first Austrian football team, the Vienna Ramblocks, Stefan Herdey decided to found an American football team. After an advertisement was placed in a local newspaper, a dozen potential players attended the first meeting and founded the Graz Football Team. That team would be renamed the Graz Giants. The Giants took part in the first game between two Austrian teams, in which they lost 44–12 to the Ramblocks. With the dissolution of the Ramblocks, the Graz Giants are the oldest existing American football team in Austria.

The Giants were the first known team from Europe to win a match against a US college team. In 1991, the Giants defeated Albany State University 32–23 in an exhibition game played August 31, 1991 in the USA.

== Championships ==
=== Austrian Bowl ===
The Giants are eleven-time Austrian Bowl Champions having won the championship in 1986, 1987, 1988, 1990, 1991, 1992, 1995, 1997, 1998, 2008, and 2026.

=== Central European Football League ===
In 2016, the Giants won the International Central European Football League CEFL Bowl championship final defeating the Belgrade Vukovi 52-49.

=== EFAF Cup ===
The Giants are three-time winners of the EFAF Cup. In the 2002 season, the Giants won the EFAF Cup with a 37–20 victory over the Badalona Dracs, which made the club the first European Cup winner in Austrian football history. This was repeated in 2006 with a 37–20 victory against the Eidsvoll 1814s from Norway. In 2007, the Giants won the EFAF Cup for the third time with a 28–26 victory over the Cineplexx Blue Devils from Hohenems.

=== Eurobowl ===
The Giants competed in the European Football League playoffs several times. They failed to reach the Eurobowl championship final game.

=== Notable alumni ===
- Eric Beavers, QB 1991-93
- Doug Wilkerson, OL 1987 (former NFL All Pro)
- Paul Kujawa, RB/LB 1994-1996 (former Iowa Hawkeyes)
- Rick Rhoades, Head Coach 2007-2011
- Dave Dunn, DT 1991-92
- Chris Gunn, QB 2008-2012
