= IFAF Europe Champions League =

American football tournament

- Sport: American football
- Founded: 2014; 12 years ago
- Folded: 2016
- No. of teams: 13
- Country: Europe
- Last champion: (Poland) Panthers Wrocław
- Most titles: Panthers Wrocław; Carlstad Crusaders; Helsinki Roosters (1 each)
- Website: www.ifafeurope.org

The IFAF Europe Champions League was a European Cup-inspired tournament for European Gridiron teams affiliated to IFAF Europe. It has been held annually between 2014 and 2016.

== History ==
In 2014, the IFAF Europe Champions League was formed in the same year the BIG6 European Football League initiated in taking the place of the Eurobowl tournament. The format involved 13 teams from Europe. The Group Stage format borrowed from the IFAF World Championship while the Final Four format came from the NCAA Division I men's basketball tournament.

After the 2016 season the competition was replaced by the IFAF Northern European Football League 2017. The number of participating teams was reduced to 5, all from Northern Europe.

== Champions ==
=== Championship winners ===
Season	Venue	Winner	Result	Runner-up	Reference
2014	(France) Elancourt	(Finland) Helsinki Roosters	36–29	(Serbia) SBB Vukovi Beograd	
2015	(Serbia) Belgrade	(Sweden) Carlstad Crusaders	84–49	(Serbia) SBB Vukovi Beograd	
2016	(Poland) Wrocław	(Poland) Panthers Wrocław	40–37	(Italy) Seamen Milano	

=== Conference champions ===
Season	Northern Group	Central/Southern Group	Eastern Group	Western/Southern Group
2014	(Finland) Helsinki Roosters	(France) Elancourt Templiers	(Serbia) SBB Vukovi Beograd	(France) Thonon Black Panthers
2015	(Sweden) Carlstad Crusaders	(United Kingdom) London Blitz	(Serbia) SBB Vukovi Beograd	(France) Thonon Black Panthers
2016	(Poland) Panthers Wrocław	(Italy) Milano Seamen	(Turkey) İstanbul Koç Rams	(Austria) Danube Dragons

== Teams ==
Team	Seasons	2014	2015	2016	2017	Final Four	Titles won
(Austria) Cineplexx Blue Devils	1	RS				0	0
(Austria) Danube Dragons	1			SF		1	0
(Czech Republic) Prague Lions	1			RS		0	0
(Denmark) Copenhagen Towers	2	RS	RS			0	0
(Denmark) Triangle Razorbacks	1			RS		0	0
(Finland) Helsinki Roosters	2	C	RS			1	1
(France) Aix-en-Provence Argonautes	1		RS			0	0
(France) Dauphins de Nice	1	RS				0	0
(France) Elancourt Templiers	1	SF				1	0
(France) Thonon Black Panthers	2	SF	SF			2	0
(United Kingdom) London Blitz	2	RS	SF			1	0
(Hungary) Budapest Wolves	1			RS		0	0
(Italy) Parma Panthers	1	RS				0	0
(Italy) Milano Seamen	2		RS	RU		1	0
(Poland) Panthers Wrocław	1			C		1	1
(Portugal) Lisboa Devils	1			RS	X	0	0
(Russia) Moscow Patriots	1				X	0	0
(Russia) Sankt Petersburg Griffins	1			RS		0	0
(Slovenia) Ljubljana Silverhawks	1		RS			0	0
(Serbia) Kragujevac Wild Boars	1				X	0	0
(Serbia) Novi Sad Dukes	1			RS		0	0
(Serbia) SBB Vukovi Beograd	3	RU	RU	RS		2	0
(Spain) L'Hospitalet Pioners	2	RS	RS			0	0
(Spain) Rivas Osos	1		RS			0	0
(Sweden) Carlstad Crusaders	3	RS	C	RS		1	1
(Sweden) Örebro Black Knights	1	RS				0	0
(Turkey) Boğaziçi Sultans	4	RS	RS	RS	X	0	0
(Turkey) Koç Rams	2			SF	X	1	0

== See also ==
- BIG6 European Football League
- IFAF Europe
- European Football League
- Eurobowl
