= Danube American Football League =

- Most recent season or competition: 2026 DAFL season
- Sport: American football
- Founded: 2026
- No. of teams: 5
- Countries: Bulgaria, Romania, Serbia, Turkey
- Continent: Europe
- Most recent champion: Kragujevac Wild Boars (2026)

The Danube American Football League (DAFL) is an American Football league in Southeastern Europe, launched in 2026. It is composed of teams from Romania, Bulgaria, Serbia, and Turkey.

== Teams ==
Country	Team	2026
Romania	Bucharest Rebels	Romanian champions
Romania	Bucharest Titans	exhibition games only
Bulgaria	Sofia Bears	Bulgarian champion
Serbia	Kragujevac Wild Boars	Serbian champion
Turkey	İTÜ Hornets	Turkish champion

=== 2026 season ===
The regular season took place between 4 April and 13 June 2026, followed by the semi final and the championship game.

=== Regular season ===
Pos	Team	Pld	W	L	PF	PA	PD	Qualification
1	Kragujevac Wild Boars	6	6	0	241	41	+200	DAFL Bowl I
2	Bucharest Titans	6	3	3	98	139	−41	Semi-final
3	Sofia Bears	6	2	4	108	160	−52	Semi-final
4	Bucharest Rebels	6	1	5	52	159	−107	

After the regular season, Bucharest Rebels were suspended by the league, after forfeiting two away games.

=== Postseason ===
Semifinals; June 27			DAFL Bowl I July 11
			1	(Serbia) Kragujevac Wild Boars	56
2	(Romania) Bucharest Titans	34	2	(Romania) Bucharest Titans	19
3	(Bulgaria) Sofia Bears	13
