= Belgrade Blue Dragons =

- Founded: 2003
- League: HFL; CEFL
- Based in: Belgrade
- Head coach: Srđan Aleksandrović
- Championships: Balkan Football League: 2021, 2022, 2023; Balkan Football League Championship Challenge 2025

The Rubikon Blue Dragons are an American football team from Belgrade, Serbia.

== History ==
Blue Dragons was founded in July 2003 in Belgrade. Together with six other clubs, they founded the Serbian Association of American Football.

The Dragons played their first game at the beginning of November 2003, just a month after the first training session, and achieved their first win in December of the same year against the team from Novi Sad.

However, like all teams in Serbia, the Dragons played American football without protective equipment (helmets and pads) until the 2007 season. A year before 2007, the Dragons merged with the only varsity team in Serbia, the Electricians. In the same season, the Dragons were the first team in Group A of the national championship, eventually reaching the semi-finals. The defeat in the semi-final came against the city rivals (Vukovi Belgrade) after 3 overtimes.

In the 2008 season, the senior team had no notable success while our junior team reached the finals.

In the 2009 season, we reached the finals of the national league, we played in the EFAF Cup, and our junior team won the championship title.

In the 2010 season, we reached the semi-finals of the national league and participated in the EUROBOWL competition.

Apart from the domestic championship (SAAF Sportklub Superliga Serbia) in 2011, in which we won fifth place, we also played in the Central-Eastern European Interleague, in which we recorded third place.

In 2012 and 2013, we were semi-finalists of the SAAF Sportklub Superliga of Serbia, while in 2013 we were also vice-champions of the CEFL Cup.

During the 2014 season, the Dragons competed in both the domestic championship and the Central European Interleague. The club recorded two victories and, for the first time in its history, was relegated to a lower division.

In the 2015 season, the Dragons played in the Second League of Serbia, winning all their matches. In addition to the domestic competition, they also played in the third and final season of the Alpe Adria Football League.

In the 2016 season, the Dragons were promoted back to the SAAF First League, reaching the semi-finals of the championship.

In the 2017 season, the Dragons reached the semi-finals of the domestic championship and also took part in the CEFL Cup for the second time. In the match for third place, played away from home, the Dragons defeated the Sarajevo Spartans.

In 2018 and 2019, the Dragons reached the semi-finals of the domestic Championship for the sixth and seventh time.

In 2020, the entire world was hit by the pandemic of the COVID-19 virus, so instead of the regular season, a non-contact version (touch football) was played.

After permission to play in the regular season in the years 2021 and 2022, they reached the semi-finals of the domestic championship for the first time. They then won the Balkan League for the second time.

After two difficult seasons and the departure of head coach Željko Novak to Italy, Blue Dragons appointed long-time offensive lineman Srđan Aleksandrović as the head coach for the Senior and the Junior teams. In the 2025 SAAF Serbian First League, the Dragons finished with the same score as the Kragujevac Wild Boars (5-1), defeated Vukovi in the semifinal and secured their first Serbian Bowl appearance. However, the Wild Boars won on their home field 25-12.

At the start of the 2026, the SAAF announced that the senior tackle football season won't be played. Blue Dragons applied and received permission from MAFSZ to compete in the HFL, the highest division of Hungarian American Football. The club also returned to CEFL, and in the 1/8-finals against the Wild Boars defeated the home team to advance to quarterfinals against Firenze Guelfi.

Since its inception, the club has been represented by more than 500 people.

== History ==
- 2003 (1 W - 1 L)
- 2004 4 City Cup runners-up (3 W - 2 L)
- 2005 SAFS Cup - 7th place (1 W - 1 L)
- 2006 (1 W - 1 L)
- 2007 SAFS National League runners-up, SAFS Super National league semi-final, 4th team in Serbia (6 W-5 L)
- 2008 (3W - 4L)
- 2009 (6W - 5L) SAFS NLS runners-up, SAFS vice-champions, EFAF Cup contenders, Champions of Junior League SAFS JLS
- 2010 (4W - 3L) SAFS NLS runners-up, Eurobowl contenders
- 2011 (3W - 4L) 5th place in SAAF Superleague
- 2012 (3W - 4L) SAAF NLS runners-up
- 2013 (3W - 4L) SAAF NLS runners-up
- 2014 (1W - 6L) SAAF NLS 6th place, moving to 2nd Division 3rd place in CEI Interleague
- 2015 (6W - OL) SAAF runners-up, champions of 2nd Division 4th place in ALPE Adria League
- 2016 (3W-4L) SAAF Superleague 5th place
- 2017 (4W-3L) SAAF Superleague runners-up, CEFL Cup 3rd place
- 2018 (4W-3L) SAAF Superleague runners-up
- 2019 (4W-3L) SAAF Superleague runners-up
- 2021 Balkan Football League champions
- 2022 Balkan Football League champions
- 2023 Balkan Football League champions
- 2025 (6W-2L) SAAF Serbian Bowl runners-up
- 2025 Balkan Football League Champions Challenge Winner

== Roster ==
For 2026 Blue Dragons play the following players:

Blue Dragons Belgrade Team roster
| Quarterbacks: Michael Cornwell; Mihailo Đokić; Andrej Tasić; Running backs: Željko Kostić; Varsey Bright (DB); Wide receivers: Aleksandar Demić; Mateja Minić; Igor Rokvić; Elijah Smoot; Andrej Horn; Aleksey Shestopalov; Vadim Bruss; Strahinja Kosovac; Vlado Rukavina | Offensive linemen: Nikola Davidović; Igor Milošević; Svetislav Đorđić; Miljan Džogazović; Uroš Pap; Mateja Đorović; Pavle Vučenović; Nikola Lazić; Đorđe Jovićević; Andrei Dragos; Defensive linemen: Miloš Injac; Lazar Bogićević; Miloš Janković; Luka Škorić; Tomislav Cicvarić; Lazar Segedinac; Miloš Savić; Marko Francuski; Nemanja Guzina | Linebackers: Marko Božić; Stefan Irić; Miloš Pejović; David Radomirović; Luka Armuš; Slavko Jovanović; Defensive backs: Nikola Stojanović; Nikola Lekić; Varsey Bright (RB); Bogdan Stupar; Jovan Teslić; Nikola Adamović; Nikola Boškov; Marian Budean | Special Team: Zdravko Vujanov; Coaching staff: Srđan Aleksandrović (HC/OC/ST); Marko Božić (DC/LB); Predrag Trajković (Strength and conditioning); Position/Assistant coaches: Andrej Tasić (QB/WR); Nikola Davidović (OL); Miloš Injac (DL); Nemanja Stanić (DB); Ilija Jakšić (QC/AST) |

== Interesting ==
- They played 4 years without pads and helmets, and in their first season with equipment they were 4th in Serbia
