= Eric Beavers =

American football player (born 1964)

No. 5
- Position: Quarterback

Personal information
- Born: October 3, 1964 (age 62)
- Listed height: 5 ft 11 in (1.80 m)
- Listed weight: 175 lb (79 kg)

Career information
- High school: Davis (Davis, California)
- College: Nevada (1982–1986)
- NFL draft: 1987: undrafted

Career history
- Los Angeles Cobras (1988); Graz Giants (1991–1993)

Awards and highlights
- 2× All-Big Sky (1985, 1986); Big Sky Conference Offensive MVP (1986); 2× Austrian Bowl champion (1991, 1992); Austrian Football League MVP (1992)

Career AFL statistics
- Comp. / Att.: 5 / 15
- Passing yards: 71
- TD–INT: 1–0
- QB rating: 66.25
- Stats at ArenaFan.com

Eric Beavers (born October 3, 1964) is an American former football quarterback. He played college football for the Nevada Wolf Pack. Professionally, he played for the Graz Giants of the Austrian Football League and the Los Angeles Cobras of the Arena Football League.

== Early life ==
Beavers earned four letters in baseball and football at Davis High School in Davis, California. He played free safety and quarterback as a junior in football. He was not a full-time starter at quarterback until his senior year when he threw for 1,600 yards and twelve touchdowns while leading Davis to a 6–2–1 record and the Delta League championship. Beavers was named the league's Offensive Player of the Year and also earned second-team All-Metro honors in the Sacramento area. He had a .340 batting average in baseball his senior season.

== College career ==
Beavers played for the Nevada Wolf Pack of the University of Nevada from 1983 to 1986. He redshirted in 1982. He helped the Wolf Pack advance to the NCAA Division I-AA semifinals in 1983, passing for 832 yards and nine touchdowns while also rushing for 199 yards and a touchdown. Beavers led the Big Sky Conference in passing efficiency in his first full season as a starter in 1984 while passing for 2,370 yards and 16 touchdowns. He also rushed for 195 yards and three touchdowns in 1984. In 1985, he led the Big Sky in passing efficiency for the second straight year and threw for 27 touchdowns and 2,617 yards. Beavers also led the Wolf Pack to the quarterfinals of the NCAA Division I-AA playoffs and earned honorable mention All-Big Sky honors. He recorded 26 passing touchdowns his senior year in 1986, earned All-Big Sky and Big Sky Conference Offensive MVP honors, and led the Wolf Pack to a 13–1 record. He helped the Wolf Pack advance to the semifinals of the NCAA Division I-AA playoffs for the second time in 1986. Beavers finished his college career as the school's career leader in touchdown passes with 78, passing yards with 8,629, total offense with 9,028 yards and pass completions with 642. He was also named to the Big Sky All-Academic Team in 1985 and 1986. He was inducted into the University of Nevada Athletics Hall of Fame in 1999.

== Professional career ==
Beavers played for the Los Angeles Cobras of the AFL in the team's only season in 1988. He relieved starting quarterback Matt Stevens in the fourth quarter of a 66–32 win over the Pittsburgh Gladiators and threw a 27-yard touchdown pass to Joe Kelly.

Beavers played for the Graz Giants of the Austrian Football League from 1991 to 1993. Beavers was named league MVP 1992 and Giants team MVP in 1991, leading the Giants to win the Austrian Bowl league championship defeating the Vienna Vikings.

== Coaching career ==
Beavers later spent a year each as a graduate assistant for the Nevada Wolf Pack and UCLA Bruins. He also coached and played in Austria for three years. He has served as an assistant coach at Woodland High School in Woodland, California, Davis High School in Davis, California, Terra Linda High School in San Rafael, California and South Tahoe High School in South Lake Tahoe, California. Beavers has also been the head coach at South Tahoe and the junior varsity head coach for one year at Woodland. He has also taught history at South Tahoe.
