= Barbari Roma Nord =

Barbari Roma Nord
Championship	A2 LENAF
Founded	29 December 1999
Stadium	Stadio Ernesto Dezi, Rome
Città	Rome, Italy
Colors	Black and White
Chairman	Daniele Napoli
Head coach	Manuel Schollmeier
Awards	NineBowl III (2005) Young Bowl XXIII (2005), Italian Bowl (2008, 2009)
Uniform	Team uniform
Official Website	www.barbariromanord.com

Barbari Roma Nord (barbarians in Italian) is an american football team from Rome, Italy. C

The team practices in the Ernesto Dezi sports center, and has won three national awards.
