= EFAF Cup =

European American football club competition

The EFAF Cup was an international competition for European American football clubs. It was the second highest level of club competition in the European Federation of American football (EFAF), behind the European Football League (EFL),.

== EFAF Cup ==
Organised by EFAF, this competition was comparable to football's Europa League. American football teams from the strongest leagues in Europe competed annually to achieve results good enough to qualify them for the EFAF Cup competition.

The format dated from 2002 and offers top-division European clubs who have not qualified for the highest level of competition (EFL) a chance to play internationally.

Participants were Champions and Vice-Champions of the "smaller" American football nations, and those finishing just behind EFL qualification places in the "bigger" American football leagues.

The competition was folded after the 2013 edition. The reason was, in 2014 the Big6 European Football League was established as the new top tier competition. So in fact, the EFL took the place of the EFAF Cup.

== Competition format ==
In the group phase, four groups consist each of three teams. Each team plays each other once and has a home game and an away game. The winners of these groups qualify directly for the semi-final phase.

Should more teams qualify for and enter the EFAF Cup competition, more groups are created and a quarter-final phase introduced.

== Players ==
Participating teams must submit a roster of at most 60 players to EFAF by March 31 of the competition year. These players, and no others, are permitted to play for the club within the competition that year. No changes can be made to the list.

On each game day, the roster must be reduced to 45 players who will actually participate in the game. This number must include no more than 3 "American" players. In EFAF rules an "American" is defined as a player with an American, Canadian, Mexican, or Japanese passport. There is no restriction on how many of these 3 can be on the field at the same time.

== EFAF Cup Finals ==
Year	Date	City	Winners	Score	Runners-up	Attendance	MVP
2002	8 June 2002	Eggenberg, Austria	Graz Giants (Austria)	51–12	Badalona Dracs (Spain)		
2003	14 June 2003	Innsbruck, Austria	Carlstad Crusaders (Sweden)	28–7	Papa Joe's Tyrolean Raiders (Austria)	4,500	Johan Larsson, QB, (Crusaders)
2004	25 June 2004	Innsbruck, Austria	Papa Joe's Tyrolean Raiders (Austria)	45–0	Farnham Knights (United Kingdom)	4,700	
2005			Marburg Mercenaries (Germany)	49–14	Elancourt Templiers (France)		
2006	11 July 2006	Eggenberg, Austria	Turek Graz Giants (Austria)	37–20	Eidsvoll 1814s (Norway)	2,600	Darvin Lewis (Graz)
2007			Turek Graz Giants (Austria)	28–26	Cineplexx Blue Devils (Austria)		
2008	12 July 2008		Berlin Adler (Germany)	29–0	Parma Panthers (Italy)		Oliver Flemming (Berlin) and Alberto Lanzoni (Parma)
2009	4 July 2009		Prague Panthers (Czech Republic)	35–12	Thonon Black Panthers (France)		Stanislav Jantos (Prague)
2010	17 July 2010	Chur, Switzerland	Calanda Broncos (Switzerland)	17–3	Carlstad Crusaders (Sweden)	1,580	Tissi Robinson (Calanda)
2011	2 July 2011	London, United Kingdom	London Blitz (United Kingdom)	29–7	Kragujevac Wild Boars (Serbia)	2,000	Aaron Sanders-Percival (London)
2012	14 July 2012	Vejle, Denmark	Søllerød Gold Diggers (Denmark)	31–21	Triangle Razorbacks (Denmark)	1.300	Alexander Cimadon (Søllerød)
2013	13 July 2013	L'Hospitalet de Llobregat, Spain	Thonon Black Panthers (France)	66–6	L'Hospitalet Pioners (Spain)		

== Champions ==
=== by team ===
Championships	Team	Year
3	(Austria) Graz Giants	2002, 2006, 2007
1	(France) Thonon Black Panthers	2013
1	(Denmark) Søllerød Gold Diggers	2012
1	(United Kingdom) London Blitz	2011
1	(Switzerland) Calanda Broncos	2010
1	(Czech Republic) Prague Panthers	2009
1	(Germany) Berlin Adler	2008
1	(Germany) Marburg Mercenaries	2005
1	(Austria) Papa Joe's Tyrolean Raiders	2004
1	(Sweden) Carlstad Crusaders	2003

=== by country ===
Championships	Country	Year
4	Austria	2002, 2004, 2006, 2007
2	Germany	2005, 2008
1	France	2013
1	Denmark	2012
1	(United Kingdom) Great Britain	2011
1	Switzerland	2010
1	Czech Republic	2009
1	Sweden	2003
