= Donja Trnava (Topola) =

- Village
- Location within Serbia
- Coordinates: 44°12′N 20°48′E
- Country: Serbia
- District: Šumadija District
- Municipality: Topola

Population (2002)
  - Total: 921
- Time zone: UTC+1 (CET)
  - Summer (DST): UTC+2 (CEST)

Donja Trnava (Topola) (Serbian: Доња Трнава) is a village in the municipality of Topola, Serbia. According to the 2002 census, the village has a population of 921 people.
