= Danube Dragons =

American Football team from Vienna, Austria

- Founded: 1985; 41 years ago
- League: Austrian Football League
- Location: Vienna, Austria
- Stadium: Donaufeld Stadium
- Colors: Green and White
- Championships: CEFL: 2024 Austrian Bowl: 2010, 2022, 2023
- Website: danube-dragons.com

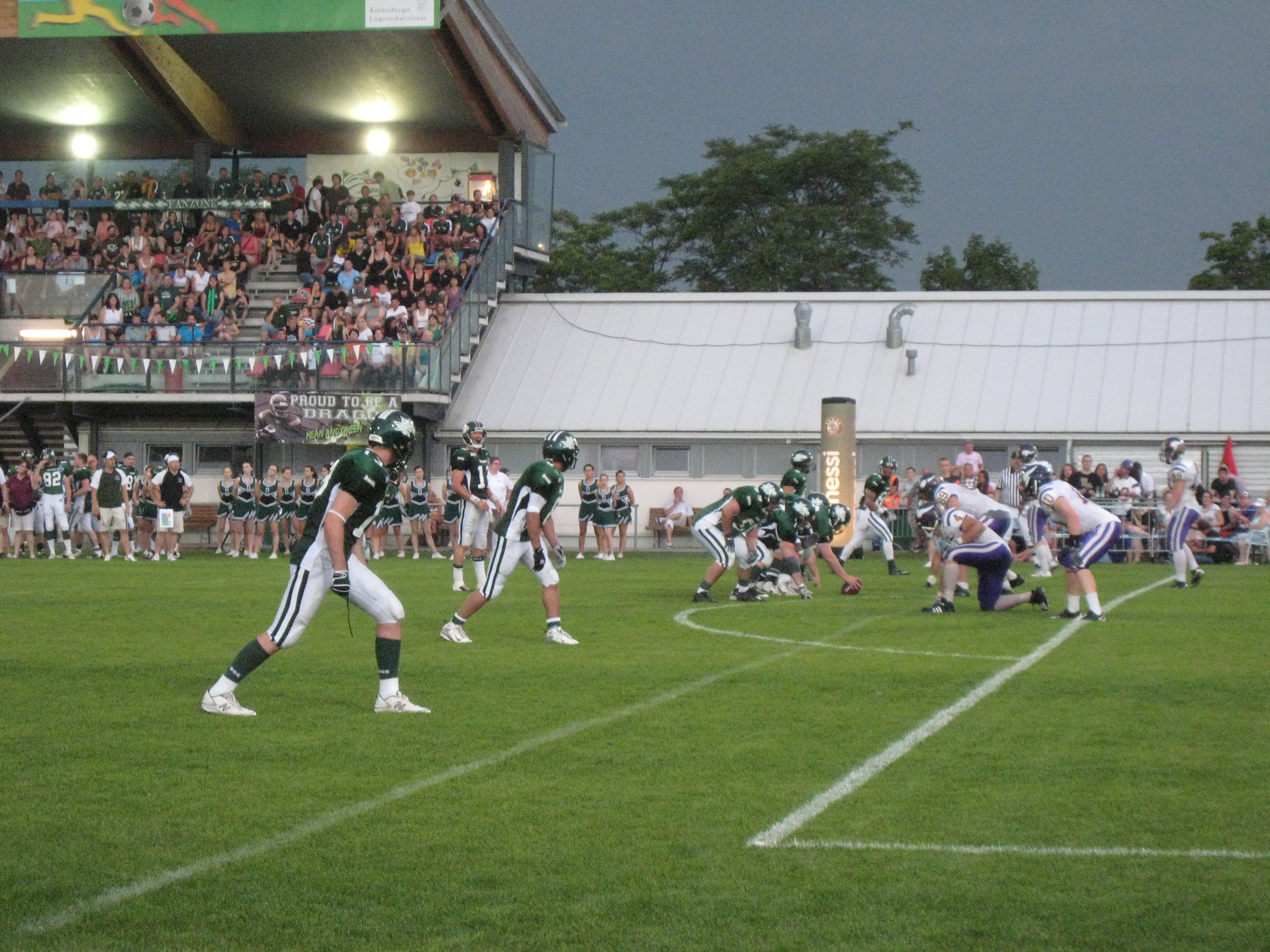
Blue River Bowl III: Danube Dragons vs. Raiffeisen Vikings Vienna (28–3) at Rattenfängerstadion (2010)

The Danube Dragons founded in 1985 (until 1999 as Klosterneuburg Mercenaries) are an American football club based in Vienna, Austria. They won the AFL championship four times and the Central European Football League championship in 2024.

== Honours ==
- Central European Football League
  - Champions: 2024
- Austrian Football League
  - Champions: 2010, 2022, 2023, 2025
  - Runners-up: 1990, 1997, 2026

== History ==
Under the name Klosterneuburg Mercenaries the Dragons were among the first American football teams in Austria and ascended up to the Austrian Football League, the highest league in Austria. During the 1990s they advanced into 2 Austrian Bowls (1990 and 1997), but they lost both against Graz Giants. In 2000 they changed their name into Danube Dragons. They have moved from Klosterneuburg into Korneuburg in 2008, and into Vienna in 2012 (playing in FC Stadlau field).

In 2010 they won the Austrian Bowl XXVI defeating the Swarco Raiders Tirol in the final. In 2022, the Dragons won the Austrian Bowl defeating the Vienna Vikings 51–29.

The team currently plays in Vienna at the Donaufeld stadium.

== Notable alumni ==
- Hugh Mendez, Head coach 1995 (won the first ever 1986 Eurobowl European championship final as head coach of Vantaa Taft from Finland)
- Eric Marty, QB 2010 (QB for Dragons first Austrian Bowl champion)
- Jonathan Dally, QB 2012-2013
- Joe Jordan, QB 1990-1991 (Won MVP of the first ever 1986 Eurobowl the final of the European Football League.
- Anthony Thompson, RB/LB 1995-1996 (former active NFL player with Denver Broncos) (AFL MVP for Salzburg Bulls in 1993)
- Geoff Stults, WR 1999 (current Hollywood Actor)
