= Örebro Black Knights =

Swedish American Football Team

General information
- Founded: 1989
- Stadium: Behrn Arena
- Headquartered: Örebro, Sweden
- Colors
- Website: https://blackknights.eu/ (in swedish)

Nickname
- Black Knights

League / conference affiliations
- SWE3 Amerikansk Fotboll; Superserien

Championships
- Division championships: 0; 2021

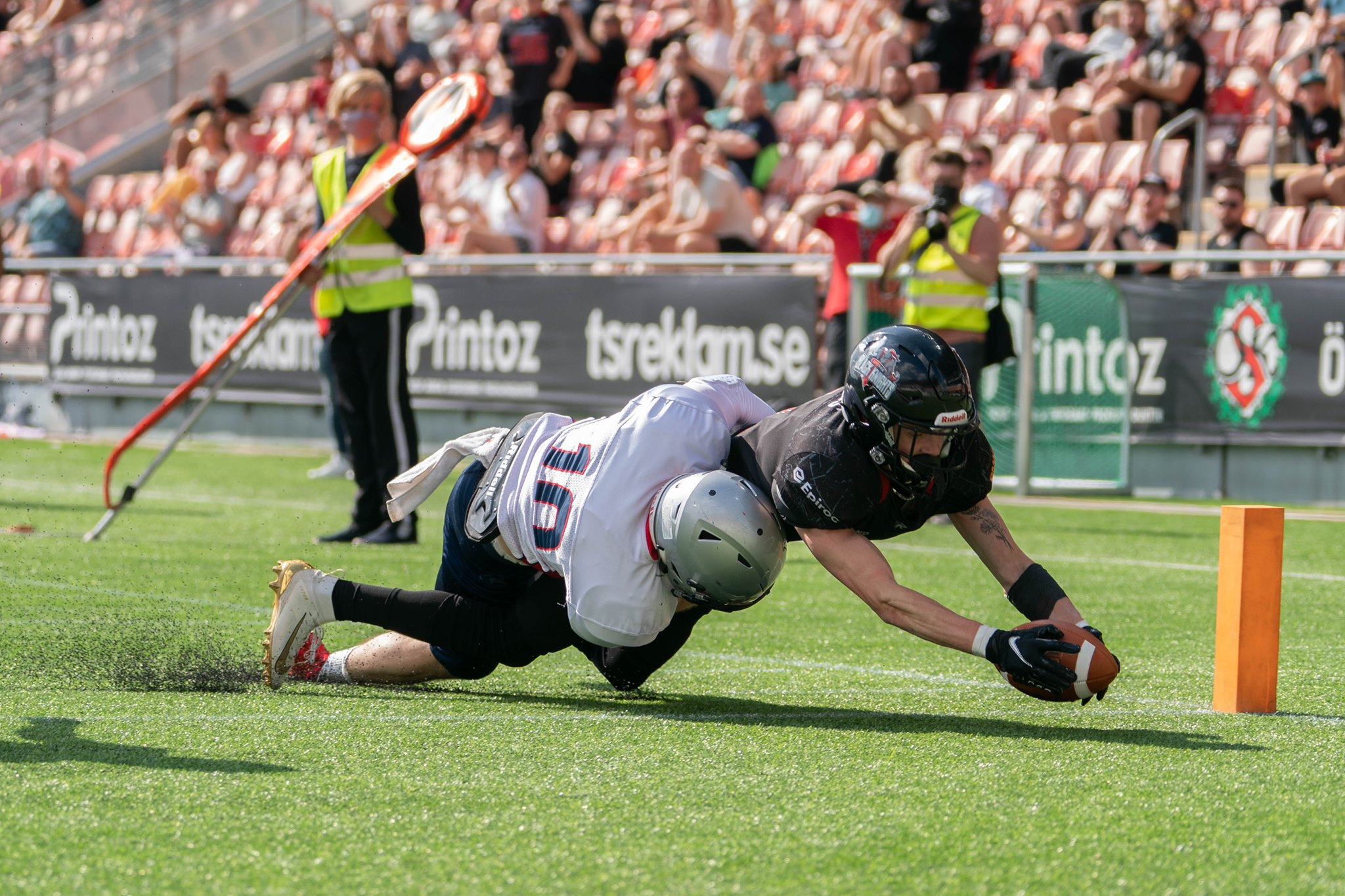
WR Johannes Lindéus for the Örebro Black Knights scoring a touchdown in the 2021 Superserien Final against the Stockholm Mean Machines.

The Örebro Black Knights are a Swedish American football team established in 1989 and based in Örebro, Sweden. The team plays in the Örebro in Sweden and their home field is the Behrn Arena. In 2014, the team competed in the IFAF Champions League in the Northern group together with Carlstad Crusaders, Copenhagen Towers and Helsinki Roosters. They have competed in the Swedish league, Swedish Superserien since 2011 which currently has 8 Swedish teams competing for the title. They reached the semi-final in the 2019 season being knocked out by Stockholm Mean Machines to later beat them in the final of 2021. The current head coach is Sam Eisenstadt.

== History ==
Black Knights were founded in 1989 by Niklas Karlsson and Trond Groth. The first meeting was held with the working name Örebro Eagles, and it was then decided that the team would be called Örebro Black Knights. The first players were trained at GIH, to later get Mark Hesse as coach for the 1991 season. The team went through the 3-2 unbeaten divisions.

The women's team won the SM finals in 2016 and 2017, but lost in the finals 2018 against Carlstad Crusaders. The men's team was in the SM final in 1998 and 1999, but both lost to Stockholm Mean Machines, and in 2013, 2014 and 2015 they lost to Carlstad Crusaders.

Their most recent championship season was in 2021 when they went on to beat the Stockholm Mean Machines 28–14 at Behrn Arena the 15th of July 2021. They were led by head coach Sam Eisenstadt.
