= Pančevo Panthers =

- Full name: KAF Pančevo Panthers
- Nickname(s): Panteri
- Founded: 2003
- Ground: Sportski Centar Mladost Pančevo, Serbia
- Capacity: 2,000
- Manager: Ivan Kosanović
- League: SAAF Superliga

The Pančevo Panthers are an American football club from Pančevo, Serbia, founded in 2003.
