= Kragujevac Wild Boars =

- Founded: 2003
- League: SAAF Serbian Superleague
- Based in: Kragujevac, Serbia
- Colors: Black and White
- President: Marko Vujanac
- Head coach: Predrag Šćekić (Serbia)
- Championships: SAFS Serbian League: 2004, 2006, 2008, 2009, 2010, 2016, 2017, 2018, 2019, 2023, 2025 SELAF Bowl: 2006 CEFL Cup: 2023 DAFL Bowl: 2026
- Website: www.wildboars.rs

The Kragujevac Wild Boars are an American football team from Kragujevac, Serbia.

As a team, Wild Boars arose from friendly tossing on the field. Organized play began in the winter of 2002–03 and culminated with first ever game in Serbia in spring 2003, in which the Wild Boars beat SBB Vukovi Beograd. After further games they founded together with other teams the Serbian Association of American Football in the same year.

This culminated in a Serbian League that had its first season in 2004. The Kragujevac Wild Boars finished this first season with the national championship. Since then, Wild Boars have won eleven national championships - 2004, 2006, 2008, 2009, 2010, 2016, 2017, 2018, 2019, 2023 and 2025 and participated in the final of the Serbian Cup in 2005.

In 2006, the Wild Boars won the Southeast European League of American Football (SELAF). In 2011, they played the EFAF Cup finals in London against the London Blitz. They were also champions of CEFL Cup in 2023.

After the demise of the Serbian Championship, the Wild Boars took part in the foundation of the Danube American Football League (DAFL), which they won in the inaugural season 2026.
