= SBB Vukovi Beograd =

- Founded: 2003
- League: CEFL, SAAF Serbian Superleague, IFAF Champions League
- Based in: Belgrade, Serbia
- Stadium: Stadium at Ada Ciganlija
- Colors: Maroon and Yellow
- President: Goran Nisavic
- Head coach: Ivan Nedeljkovic (Serbia)
- Championships: SAFS Serbian Cup: 2005 SAFS Serbian League: 2007 SAAF Serbian Superleague: 2009, 2010, 2011, 2012, 2013, 2014 SAAF Serbian First League: 2021, 2022 CEFL Bowl: 2007, 2009, 2010, 2011, 2013, 2014
- Website: www.vukovi.org

SBB Vukovi Beograd are an American football team from Belgrade, Serbia. After establishing in 2003, in just a few years SBB Vukovi have become one of the best-organized and most successful American football teams in Eastern Europe. Today SBB Vukovi are competing in the SAAF Serbian Superleague and the Central European Football League.

== Establishment ==
The interest in American football in Serbia grew rapidly after the first television broadcasts of the NFL season in 2001. The first meetings of several people who threw football began in the summer of 2002 in Belgrade Ada Ciganlija. The number of new players each week increased and, at the end of the year, was over 30 people. The club was officially founded on 14 January 2003 and was the second established American football club in Serbia. Shortly thereafter, all major cities in Serbia started with the establishment of new clubs. The first game was played in the spring of that year without helmets and shoulder pads, against the Kragujevac Wild Boars, which they won. During 2003, Vukovi played several informal games with teams from Serbia, and all were defeated, while the number of players in the team has reached over 50. The first Vukovi head coach was Igor Hoffmann.

== 2004–2005 ==
The first league game in Serbia was played in 2004, and 5 teams competed that year. This league was played without necessary equipment, pads, and helmets. The final game was played on November, 7th, 2004. In Kragujevac on the Čika Dača football field, the home team Kragujevac Wild Boars defeated Vukovi Beograd 21–6.

Instead of a league in 2005, there was a cup held in Serbia. Ten teams took part in this competition. The final game was played in Belgrade in the FK Obilić stadium on June 19th, 2005, and this time Vukovi defeated the Wild Boars, 20–6.

== 2006 – 2008 ==
In early 2006 a new club administration with the president, Goran Nisavic, helped Vukovi to buy equipment. With three more teams from Serbia and one from Slovenia new SELAF League was established (later renamed the CEFL). Vukovi and Wild Boars have again reached the finals, which was played 8 October 2006 at the Radnicki Stadium in New Belgrade in front of 3,000 spectators. The Serbian national anthem before the game is performed by famous actor Nikola Djuricko, and the group Nightshift was performing at halftime. Kragujevac was better and won 23–12. Vukovi quarterback Andrej Tasic was proclaimed SELAF League offensive MVP, but he was injured in the semifinals and could not help the Vukovi to win the title. During that season, several players were highlighted as team leaders in the future: the Tasic brothers, Petar Vitorovic, Ivan Ristic, Milos Todorovic, and Milos Stanimirovic.

Before the start of the 2007 season, a new domestic league, SAFS, was established. Ten teams competed, while competition in the CEFL increased with the joining of Hungarian and Austrian teams. At the beginning of the year Vukovi got use of the new field with artificial grass at Ada Ciganlija. The team also got a new head coach, Aleksandar Hadzi-Pavlovic, a Serbian American who had the experience of playing at the college. Together with him in the team came another American, Briton Burge, who became the starting quarterback, while Andrej Tasic joined younger brother Pavle at the wide receiver position. It turned out to be a winning combination. Vukovi lost only one game during the season and at the start of Novi Sad Dukes. In the semifinal match of the CEFL league, Vukovi defeated the Austrian team CNC Gladiators 28–3. The Serbian national anthem is performed by Aleksandra Kovac, MTV Europe Music Awards winner. It was the first Vukovi Beograd game that was broadcast on national TV Avala. In the final at 27 October 2007 at Ada Ciganlija, opponents were Budapest Wolves. Wolves are leading 27–13, 1:40 before the end, but Vukovi finished in a memorable turn and managed to win against the Hungarians 28–27. Finals MVP was WR Pavle Tasic, who caught 122 yards and a TD. Vukovi, a week later, won the title of the Serbian champions, beating Novi Sad Dukes 25–15 at Ada Ciganlija.

Before the start of the 2008 season, head coach Aleksandar Hadzi Pavlovic and QB Briton Burge left the team, but two new Americans Jordan Green and William Blocker, joined Vukovi, which had the feature player-coach. The season is well started for Vukovi; opponents have been falling in the order in the SAFS Serbian league as well as the CEFL Championship. But Vukovi first have lost in SAFS Serbian league finals of Kragujevac Wild Boars 38–31 and several months later in CEFL Bowl of CNC Gladiators 14–8 in Vienna. CEFL League MVPs were Vukovi QB Jordan Green and DB Ivan Nedeljkovic.

== 2009 – 2010 ==
Two miserable defeats in the finals have made clear that notice is necessary for Vukovi to have a head coach next season. John D. Harper joined Vukovi as a coach who has extensive experience coaching in Europe and has twice won the Eurobowl with the Bergamo Lions. Green and Blocker returned for next season, and into the team came another American RB, Brandon McDowell. Cineplexx Blue Devils of the Austrian Football League have joined CEFL, and since the beginning of the season everybody had already seen them with Vukovi in the finals. In the regular season, in the first match in April in Ada Ciganlija Vukovi won 49–48 in 2nd overtime after an amazing game full of twists. In the second season match in September, the Blue Devils were successful in Hohenems 35–20, Vukovi have experienced first defeat of the season. In the semifinals Vukovi won 28–13 over Ljubljana Silverhawks. In CEFL Bowl IV, Vukovi were again met with the Blue Devils, beating them 39–20 more than convincingly. It was the second CEFL title for Vukovi Beograd and the third consecutive season, as Vukovi have not lost a match at home – Ada Ciganlija. Jordan Green was the MVP of the finals, and DE Milos Lisanin was CEFL defensive player of the year. In the newly formed Serbian SAAF Super League (after separation from the Serbian American football association – SAFS) Vukovi have easily won the title, beating Novi Sad Dukes in the finals 46–0. Brandon McDowell was the offensive MVP in the SAAF Super League.

Almost all players have been remained in the team for 2010 season, only William Blocker came back to United States, and Tony Stubbs, former starting safety for Kansas Jayhawks football, joined Vukovi. One of the biggest additions in history of American football in Serbia was the arrival of former NFL star Reuben Droughns as Vukovi assistant coach.

Vukovi have started the season with a preseason game (with future Austrian Football League champions) Danube Dragons, and lost in an exciting finish 30–27. Season continues with games in the SAAF Serbian Superleague and in the Central Football European League. Vukovi were dominant, they have not lost a single game throughout the season. In SAAF Serbian Superleague title game, they won, beating Novi Sad Dukes 40–2 in Ada Ciganlija. League MVP was returnee QB/WR Andrej Tasic. In CEFL Bowl V held in Ljubljana 18 July 2010, Vukovi are playing excellent and defeated Ljubljana Silverhawks 42–20 and won a third CEFL championship. For the second time DE Milos Lisanin is chosen for Defensive MVP of league.

Despite the successful season, at the beginning of 2011, head coach John Harper was replaced by Rex Stevenson.

== 2011 ==
Switch in generations took place before the start of the season. Vukovi have lost approximately 10 starters. Also, at the beginning of the season, Vukovi best all around player Andrej Tasic retired from playing. Defense leaders LB Milos Todorovic and FS Ivan Ristic are also retired before the start of the season. Vukovi promoted their assistant coach to interim head coach Reuben Droughns, since new head coach, Rex Stevenson, was fired after just one game. Vukovi brought in new American qurtarback Vinnie Miroth (former University of Tennessee at Chattanooga quarterback), and many new players came up from junior team and other Serbian teams. Other American players, McDowell and Stubbs remained with the team in 2011.

Two Serbian federations were reunited after a two-year break, making the SAAF Serbian Superleague a lot harder competition in 2011. Before the season, the Vukovi were not considered favorites to win the championship. Big problems with injuries have further weakened the team during the season. However, the Vukovi were able to record only one loss in the CEFL league regular season (from Ljubljana Silverhawks) and one loss in the SAAF Serbian Superleague regular season (from the biggest rival Kragujevac Wild Boars).

After the victory over the Pancevo Panthers in the semifinals of SAAF Serbian Superleague, Vukovi advanced to the finals which was played in Kragujevac. Vukovi have played one of the best games in the history of the team, and won 51–36 over Kragujevac Wild Boars. The MVP of the finals was Bratislav Bosnjak, who came before the start of the season from Pancevo Panthers.

Vinnie Miroth played great all season, and was named CEFL league offensive MVP and also CEFL finals offensive MVP. Vukovi once again won CEFL Bowl, beating Budapest Wolves 34–33 in Budapest.

Vukovi Beograd remained undefeated in their home grounds, stadium at Ada Ciganlija for the fifth straight season.

== 2012 ==
Before the start of the season Vukovi promoted their new head coach Sean Embree, a coach with experience at Denver Broncos and Colorado Buffaloes. Reuben Droughns remained with the team as defensive coordinator. Once again, team had a change of generations and also many new players from other Serbian teams joined in. RB Brandon McDowell extended his contract and the team brought the new quarterback Lance Kriesien (Northern Arizona University).

On 13 March 2012, the biggest Serbian cable network Serbia Broadband became the main sponsor, and the team changed its name to SBB Vukovi Beograd.

After winning the national title against their fiercest rival, the Wild Boars, once again, Vukovi lost the CEFL finals against the Ljubljana Silverhawks with 34–21. It was their first-ever loss on home grounds at Ada Ciganlija.

Player awards went to linebacker Nemanja "Scholes" Lazarevic who was voted as Serbian Superleague defensive MVP. Wide receiver Filip Stojanovic received Superleague offensive MVP award. Lance Kriesien was voted as MVP of the Serbian finals and he also got award for best CEFL offensive player in 2012.

== 2013 ==
In season 2013 Vukovi have signed again head coach Sean Embree. Reuben Droughns could not come back for personal reasons. Vukovi had new additions in the coaching cadre getting respectable domestic coaches to help out Embree – Blazo Bojic, Igor Ilic, Bogdan Djurdjevic, Nick Zivkovic and Petar Vitorovic. Team was almost the same as in the previous season with couple of new additions such as national team players Josovic, Vezmar and Stanojev. Lance Kriesen was the QB again for the Vukovi and the two new players were brought in, receiver Tony Washington (Sacramento State University) and linebacker/db Paul Wright (Central Washington University)

2013 season will be remembered as one of the most dominant Vukovi performances both in the CEFL and Serbian Superleague up to date. Vukovi won both CEFL and Serbian Superleague finals with one game vs Kragujevac Wild Boars. Since both teams qualified for both finals, they decided to play one game in Belgrade and Vukovi won 42–0. Vukovi went undefeated 15–0 in that season. Lance Kriesen got offensive MVP awards together with newcomer runningback Mihailo Josovic as a best domestic player while defensive MVP was Milos Lisanin again in both CEFL and SAAF.

== 2014 ==
SBB Vukovi have signed a new coach, Kirk Mastromateo, long time offensive coordinator from Bethune Cook University and Norfolk State University. Also, a change in quarterback happened: Vukovi signed Shaun Rutherford from Texas State University. Besides Rutherford, Vukovi brought in Dextrell Simmons from Boise State and second-year returner, receiver Tony Washington.

SBB Vukovi applied to join the IFAF Champions League, a part of the new continental European Competition. As a result, two of the best ever domestic Vukovi players, WR/QB Andrej Tasic and OL Petar Vitorovic, decided to come out of retirement. They won the domestic championship once again upon defeating the Wild Boars 27–17, and then won the CEFL by defeating the Ljubljana Silverhawks 27–17. They finally played for the IFAF Champions League title but lost the finals against the Helsinki Roosters by 36–29, with a touchdown in the closing moments of the game.

== 2015 ==
Vukovi entered the 2015 season with a new head coach, Brian Mayper, and a younger team. Runner-ups in the IFAF European Championship with a final record of 12–3.

== Finals results ==
Serbian League	Champion	Opponent	Result
2004 – SAFS Serbian League*	Kragujevac Wild Boars	Vukovi Beograd	21–6
2005 – SAFS Serbian Cup*	Vukovi Beograd	Kragujevac Wild Boars	20–6
2007 – SAFS Serbian League	Vukovi Beograd	Novi Sad Dukes	25–15
2008 – SAFS Serbian League	Kragujevac Wild Boars	Vukovi Beograd	39–33
2009 – SAAF Serbian Superleague	Vukovi Beograd	Novi Sad Dukes	46–0
2010 – SAAF Serbian Superleague	Vukovi Beograd	Novi Sad Dukes	40–2
2011 – Serbian Bowl VII	Vukovi Beograd	Kragujevac Wild Boars	51–36
2012 – Serbian Bowl VIII	Vukovi Beograd	Kragujevac Wild Boars	35–24
2013 – Serbian Bowl IX	Vukovi Beograd	Kragujevac Wild Boars	42–0
2014 – Serbian Bowl X	Vukovi Beograd	Kragujevac Wild Boars	27–17
2015 – Serbian Bowl XI	Novi Sad Dukes	Vukovi Beograd	25–23
2016 – Serbian Bowl XII	Kragujevac Wild Boars	Vukovi Beograd	53–29
2018 – Serbian Bowl XIV	Kragujevac Wild Boars	Vukovi Beograd	54–36
2019 – Serbian Bowl XV	Kragujevac Wild Boars	Vukovi Beograd	60–55
2021 – Serbian Bowl XVI	Vukovi Beograd	Banat Bulls	24–14
2022 – Serbian Bowl XVII	Vukovi Beograd	Kragujevac Wild Boars	24–17
2023 – Serbian Bowl XVIII	Kragujevac Wild Boars	Vukovi Beograd	48–7
2024 – Serbian Bowl XIX	Vukovi Beograd	Kragujevac Wild Boars	28–6

* League played without equipment

CEFL	Champion	Opponent	Result
2006 – CEFL Bowl I	Kragujevac Wild Boars	Vukovi Beograd	23 – 12
2007 – CEFL Bowl II	Vukovi Beograd	Budapest Wolves	28 – 27
2008 – CEFL Bowl III	CNC Gladiators	Vukovi Beograd	14 – 8
2009 – CEFL Bowl IV	Vukovi Beograd	Cineplexx Blue Devils	39 – 20
2010 – CEFL Bowl V	Vukovi Beograd	Ljubljana Silverhawks	42 – 20
2011 – CEFL Bowl VI	Vukovi Beograd	Budapest Wolves	34 – 33
2012 – CEFL Bowl VII	Ljubljana Silverhawks	Vukovi Beograd	34 – 21
2013 – CEFL Bowl VIII	Vukovi Beograd	Kragujevac Wild Boars	42 – 0
2014 – CEFL Bowl IX	Vukovi Beograd	Ljubljana Silverhawks	27 – 17

IFAF Champions League	Champion	Opponent	Result
2014 – IFAF Champions League Finals	Helsinki Roosters	Vukovi Beograd	36 – 29
