= Carlstad Crusaders =

Swedish American football team

- Founded: 1991
- League: Superserien
- Based in: Karlstad, Sweden
- Stadium: Sola Arena (4,000)
- Colors: Black, Red and White
- Owner: Member owned
- President: Maria Magnelin
- Head coach: Men: Christian "Tjuren" Forsman Women: Henrik Dahl
- Manager: Jan-Sture Larsson
- Championships: 2003, 2010, 2011, 2012, 2013, 2014, 2015, 2016, 2017, 2020, 2024, 2025
- Website: http://www.crusaders.se/

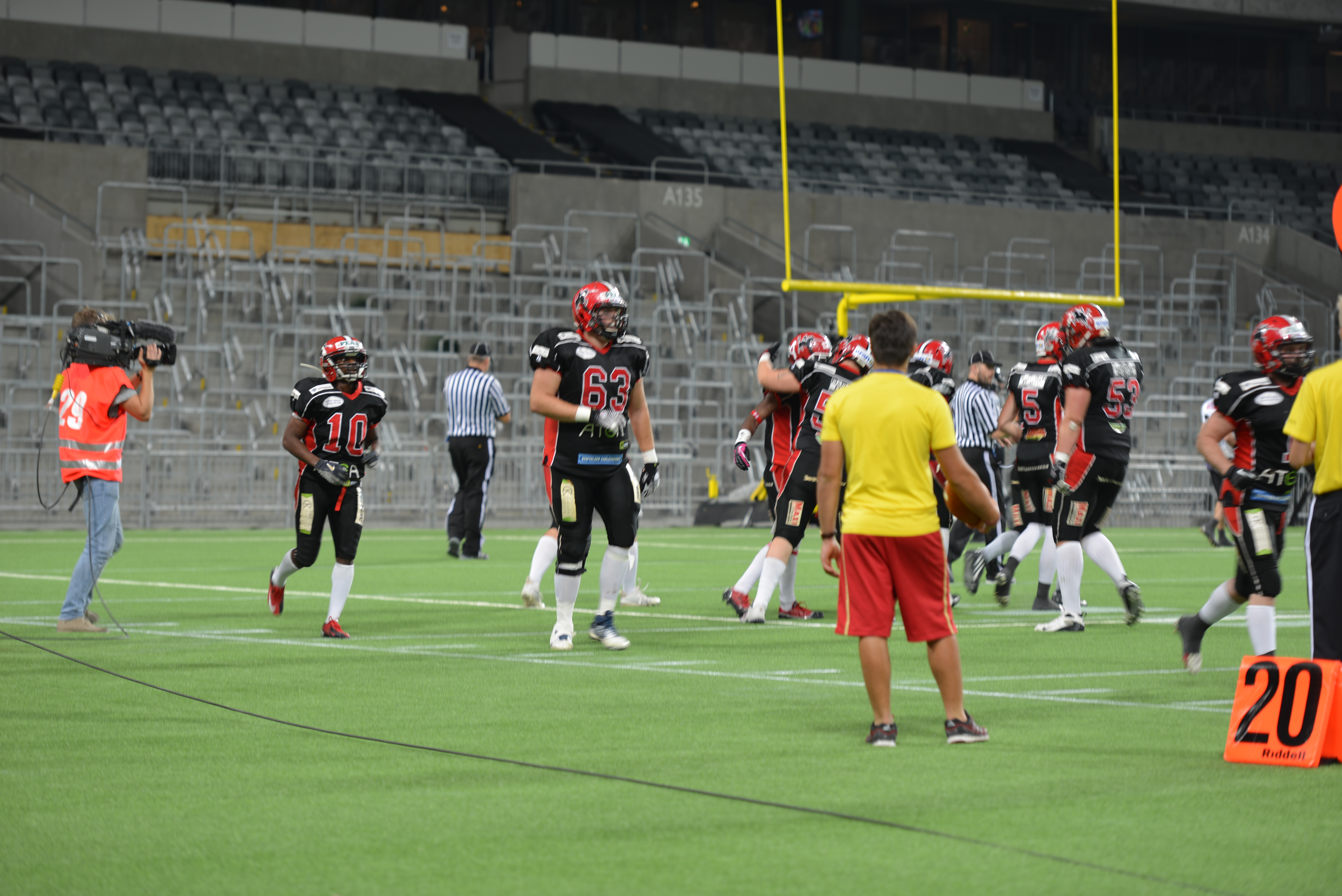

Carlstad Crusaders is a Swedish American football team, based in Karlstad, Sweden. The team plays at Sola arena in Karlstad.

== History ==
The club was founded in 1991 Forshaga. It played its first game in 1992 against the Uddevalla Ravens.

== Championships ==
=== Sweden Superserien ===
Sweden Superserien championships
The Crusaders are ten-time Swedish champions having won the championship in 2010, 2011, 2012, 2013, 2014, 2015, 2016, 2017, 2020, 2024 and 2025.

Sweden Superserien finals appearances
The team has been to nineteen national finals in 2002, 2003, 2004, 2005, 2006, 2007, 2009, 2010, 2011, 2012, 2013, 2014, 2015, 2016, 2017, 2018, 2019, 2020, 2024 and 2025.

=== EFAF Cup ===
The Crusaders won the EFAF Cup in 2003.

=== IFAF Europe Champions League ===
The Crusaders were IFAF Europe Champions League champions in 2015.

=== Scandinavian Cup ===
The Crusaders won the Scandinavian Cup in 2023.
