= Valentin Senn =

Austrian gridiron football player (born 2000)

No. 69 – Arizona Cardinals
- Position: Offensive tackle
- Roster status: Practice squad

Personal information
- Born: 23 April 2000 (age 26); Volders, Austria
- Listed height: 6 ft 7 in (2.01 m)
- Listed weight: 310 lb (141 kg)

Career information
- College: Colorado (2019–2020); UConn (2021–2024)
- NFL draft: 2025: undrafted

Career history
- Arizona Cardinals (2025–present)*
- * Offseason or practice squad member only

Career NFL statistics as of 2025
- Games started: 0
- Games played: 0
- Stats at Pro Football Reference

Valentin Senn (23 April 2000) is an Austrian professional American football offensive tackle for the Arizona Cardinals of the National Football League (NFL). He played for the Swarco raiders tirol through 2018, winning an Austrian bowl. Senn played college football for the Colorado Buffaloes and UConn Huskies.

== Early life ==
Senn was born 23 April 2001 in Volders, Austria. He mainly played soccer as a child and did not begin to play American football until 2015. Senn instead played trumpet for the Swarovski Orchestra and sang in the Stimmpfeffer choir. He attended BHAK Hall in Tirol, Austria, and was the only one in his class to receive an excellence award for maintaining a GPA of 3.5 or higher. Senn speaks German, English, and Italian. When he first played football, Senn played wide receiver, and then tight end. He switched to offensive tackle when he was on his way to college.

Senn played 3 years in Austria with the AFL SWARCO Raiders-Tirol. He won the Austrian Bowl with the team in 2018. He is the second member of the team to join an NFL team, after Sandro Platzgummer.

== College career ==
Senn was the number-two prospect in Europe and the number-one prospect in Austria. He received 9 different Division I scholarship offers on his third trip to America.

=== University of Colorado ===
He was recruited by the University of Colorado and spent two years there, becoming the first Austrian to join Colorado University. He was the scout of the week for both offense and special teams. Senn spent his first year as a redshirt before starting his redshirt-freshman year.

=== University of Connecticut ===
He transferred to University of Connecticut (UConn), where he played for three years. He assisted the team in winning a Fenway Bowl. Senn played 41 games at UConn, including 38 straight starts at left tackle. Senn started all 13 games for UConn in his sophomore year, and all 12 in his senior year, following which he was named to the East–West Shrine Bowl 1000 watchlist. Senn played in the Under Armour All-America bowl.

== Professional career ==
Pre-draft measurables
Height	Weight	Arm length	Hand span	Wingspan	40-yard dash	10-yard split	20-yard split	20-yard shuttle	Three-cone drill	Vertical jump	Broad jump	Bench press
6 ft 6 3/8 in (1.99 m)	308 lb (140 kg)	33 1/2 in (0.85 m)	10 in (0.25 m)	6 ft 7 in (2.01 m)	5.14 s	1.75 s	2.84 s	4.64 s	8.00 s	31.5 in (0.80 m)	9 ft 0 in (2.74 m)	25 reps
All values from Pro Day

=== CFL draft ===
He was drafted 9th overall in the Canadian Football League international draft by the Toronto Argonauts but did not sign with the team.

=== 2025 season ===
Senn changed his number from 71 to 69 and then signed as an undrafted free agent with the Arizona Cardinals. His signing bonus was $40,000 and his contract is part guaranteed. He was ranked as the 40th overall offensive lineman in the 2025 NFL draft by Dane Brugler. Senn was the 17th player on the practice squad under the international exemption rule (also known as the International Player Pathway). He suffered a neck injury before the 2025 NFL season and missed the entirety of the season.

=== 2026 season ===
Senn had some playing time in the preseason Hall of Fame Game against the Carolina Panthers. On August 30, 2026, Senn was waived by the Cardinals as a part of final roster cuts; he was re-signed to the team's practice squad the following day.
