= Budapest Wolves =

Logo

General information
- Founded: 2004; 22 years ago
- Stadium: Angyalföldi Sport- és Szabadidő Központ (Budapest)
- Headquartered: Budapest, Hungary
- Colors: Red and Black
- Mascot: Lupi
- Website: www.wolves.hu

Personnel
- General manager: Ferenc Sződy
- Head coach: Bálint Hegedűs

League / conference affiliations
- Hungarian Football League

Championships
- League championships: 0; 8 (2005, 2008, 2009, 2010, 2012, 2018, 2021, 2023)

Current uniform
Home

Away

The Budapest Wolves are an American football team from Budapest, Hungary. After establishing in 2004, in just few years the Wolves have become one of the best organized and most successful American football teams in Hungary. Today, the Wolves are competing in the Hungarian Football League.

== Brief history ==
The Budapest Wolves were formed in 2004 by the name of Budapest American Football Club. Founder manager was Attila Árpa, who played in the club until 2009 regularly. The Wolves became one of the most successful American football teams in Hungary, have been undefeated between 2004 and 2012 under head coach Lee Hlavka, and are 7-times Hungarian Bowl champions and 8-times Hungarian champions. The Wolves also participated in Austrian lower divisions and in the Central European Football League.

== Season summary ==
=== Hungarian championship ===
Year	Division	Finish	Games	W	L	PF	PA	Postseason
2005	MAFL	1st	3	3	0	173	14	Won SF: Nagykanizsa Demons (72–2) Won HB: Debrecen Gladiators (46–0)
2008	Div I (Group A)	1st	5	5	0	260	35	Won SF: Budapest Titans (55–0) Won HB: Budapest Cowboys (20–14)
2009	Div I	1st	4	4	0	173	14	Won SF: Nyíregyháza Tigers (26–7) Won HB: Győr Sharks (16–12)
2010	Div I	1st	6	6	0	282	24	Won SF: Újbuda Rebels (17–7) Won HB: Nyíregyháza Tigers (58–0)
2012	HFL	2nd	3	2	1	95	46	Won HB VII: Budapest Hurricanes (65–21)
2013	HFL	2nd	4	3	1	168	124	Lost HB VIII: Budapest Hurricanes (24–28)
2014	HFL	1st	6	4	2	237	166	Lost HB IX: Újbuda Rebels (9–19)
2015	HFL	3rd	6	4	2	295	122	Won SF: Budapest Cowbells (46–21) Lost HB: Bratislava Monarchs (34–55)
2016	HFL	6th	5	1	4	114	130	—
2017	HFL	4th	5	2	3	159	148	Lost SF: Miskolc Steelers (25–27)
2018	HFL	1st	7	6	1	209	76	Won SF: Nyíregyháza Tigers (35–20) Won HB: Miskolc Steelers (34–30)
2019	HFL	1st	5	5	0	152	66	Lost SF: Kyiv Capitals (27–35)
2021	HFL	2nd	4	2	2	53	68	Won HB: Fehérvár Enthroners (18–7)
2022	HFL	3rd	4	2	2	92	105	Won SF: Budapest Cowbells (21–14) Lost HB: Fehérvár Enthroners (24–31)

- SF = Semi finals
- HB = Hungarian Bowl

=== Austrian championship ===
Year	Division	Finish	Games	W	L	PF	PA	Postseason
2005	Div 2	1st	4	3	1			Won SF: Cinneplexx Blue Devils II (27–0) Lost CB II: Tyrolean Raiders II (6–24)
2006	Div 1		6	3	3			—
2007	Div 1	2nd	8	7	1			Lost SF: St. Pölten Invaders (20–22)
2014	Div 3 (Group A/B)	2nd	6	5	1	227	70	Won SF: Telfs Patriots (35–9) Won CB XI: Fürstenfeld Raptors (41–14)
2015	Div 2 (Group A)	1st	8	7	1	248	120	Won SF: Salzburg Bulls (37–20) Won IB VIII: Armstetten Thunder (24–21)
2016	Div 1 (East)	3rd	8	4	4	228	241	—
2017	Div 1 (Group B)	5th	8	1	7	127	271	—

- SF = Semi finals
- CB = Challenge Bowl
- IB = Iron Bowl

=== International ===
Year	Division	Finish	Games	W	L	PF	PA	Postseason
2007	SELAF (North)	1st	7	6	1	256	132	Won SF: Novi Sad Dukes (21–14) Lost SB II: SBB Vukovi Beograd (27–28)
2008	CEFL (North)	2nd	10	5	5	230	203	Lost SF: SBB Vukovi Beograd (7–21)
2009	CEFL (Conf. B)	3rd	8	4	4	184	130	—
2010	CEFL	3rd	6	2	4	126	121	Lost SF: Ljubljana Silverhawks (14–31)
2011	CEFL	2nd	6	4	2	156	106	Lost CB VI: SBB Vukovi Beograd (33–34)
2012	CEFL	4th	6	2	4	160	204	Lost SF: SBB Vukovi Beograd (15–34)
2013	CEFL	4th	6	0	6	112	299	—
2014	CEFL	4th	6	0	6	61	271	—
2016	IFAF ECL (Central)	3rd	2	0	2	13	85	—
2019	CEFL Cup							Lost QF Bolzano Giants 19–36

- QF = Quarter finals
- SF = Semi finals
- SB = SELAF Bowl
- CB = CEFL Bowl

== See also ==
- Hungarian American Football League
- Austrian Football League
- Central European Football League
