= Lisbon Navigators =

American football team in Lisbon, Portugal

- Founded: April 2007; 19 years ago
- League: Liga Portuguesa de Futebol Americano
- Based in: Lisbon, Portugal
- Stadium: Lisbon University Stadium
- Colors: Navy and White con Damiana
- President: Jason Resendiz
- Head coach: Amilcar Piedade
- Championships: LPFA Portuguese American Football Cup: 2010–2015
- Website: www.lisboanavigators.pt

Uniforms
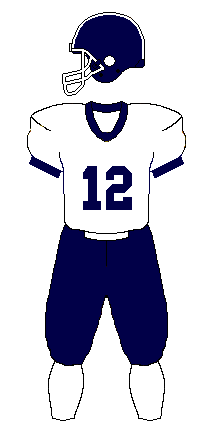

The Lisbon Navigators (Portuguese: Lisboa Navigators) is an American football team based in Lisbon, Portugal. Founded in April 2007, the Navigators compete in the Liga Portuguesa de Futebol Americano.

== History ==
The Lisbon Navigators are the third Portuguese-American Football team, established two years after the Porto Renegades and the Crusaders American Football Team (2005).

The Lisbon Navigators first played as a visiting team in the Liga Nacional de Fútbol Americano (LNFA) and joined the newly formed Liga Portuguesa de Futebol Americano (LPFA) the subsequent year. In its first season, the Navigators beat the Paredes Lumberjacks in the first Portuguese American Football Cup, becoming the first American Football champions of Portugal.

In their second season, the Navigators earned another LNFA title by defeating the Lumberjacks, 37-27 in the second Portuguese American Football Cup (2011). The Navigators won again in the third Portuguese American Football Cup, beating the Maximinos Warriors, 26-7.

During the 2013 – 2015 seasons, the Navigators continued dominating the field, defeating the Porto Mutts by 20-12 in 2013 and winning the next two Portuguese American Football Cups in 2014 and 2015. The Navigators have been compared to the Budapest Wolves of Hungary, the Bucharest Warriors of Romania, the Bratislava Monarchs of Slovakia, and the Ljubljana Silverhawks of Slovenia.

== Roster ==
QB - Quarterbacks: (Portugal) 12 Tiago Soares; (Portugal) 18 José Pedro; RB - Running Backs: (Portugal) 22 Filipe Pereira; (Portugal) 25 Rui Sineiro; (Portugal) 27 Marco Madeira; (Portugal) 5 Pedro Barbosa; (Portugal) 9 Ricardo Ladeira; FB - Fullbackers: (Portugal) 28 Filipe Grangeiro; (Portugal) 32 António Sineiro; WR - Wide Receivers: (Portugal) 2 David Simões; (Portugal) 16 Gonçalo Ramos; (Portugal) 17 Miguel Franco; (Portugal) 15 Nuno Pereira; (Portugal) 85 Paulo Monteiro; (Portugal) 20 Carlos Ferreira; T - Tackles: (Cape Verde) 62 Arnold Soares; (Portugal) 58 Elek Andrade; (Portugal) 64 Pedro Queiroga; (Portugal) 56 Vinicius Franco; G - Guards: (Portugal) 54 Filipe Campos; (Portugal) 73 Pedro Calado; (Portugal) 72 Carlos Cunha; (Portugal) 79 Miguel Pereira; (Portugal) 70 Tiago Baloca; C - Centers: (Portugal) 69 André Andrade; (Portugal) 76 Carlos Barranhas; TE - Tight Ends: (Portugal) 11 Francisco Malheiro; (Portugal) 4 Nélson Fidalgo; (Mozambique) 87 Casemiro Júnior; K - Placekickers: (Portugal) 81 Emanuel Morais	CB - Cornerbacks: (Portugal) 13 João Costa; (Portugal) 21 João Soares; (Portugal) 43 Flávio Barros; (Portugal) 47 João Vieira; (Portugal) 19 Francisco Xavier; (Portugal) 24 João Carneiro; (Portugal) 99 Fábio Laré; S - Safeties: (Portugal) 14 André Monteiro; (Portugal) 2 Pedro Simões; (Portugal) 46 Tiago Gomes; (Portugal) 52 Filipe Cunha; (Portugal) 15 Miguel Miranda; (Portugal) 29 Afonso Amaral; LB - Linebackers: (Portugal) 38 Paulo Silva; (Portugal) 48 João Fonseca; (Angola) 50 Miguel Matias; (Portugal) 55 Daniel Fernandes; (Portugal) 80 Amílcar Piedade; DT - Defensive Tackle: (Portugal) 8 Ivan Santana; (Brazil) 10 Michael Moreira; (Portugal) 63 Nuno Gaião; (Portugal) 75 Igor Almeida; (Portugal) 93 Daniel Lourenço; (Portugal) 88 Carlos Neves; (Portugal) 91 Pedro Quitério; (Portugal) 98 Ricardo Ramalho; DE - Defensive End: (Portugal) 33 Mário Gaião; (Portugal) 92 Bruno Settimelli; (Portugal) 57 Nuno Dâmaso; (Portugal) 39 Rui Costa; Staff Técnico: (Portugal) Daniel Silva; (Portugal) Luís Lopes

== Season Stats ==
=== Portuguese American Football Cup Finals Results ===
Liga Portuguesa de Futebol Americano	Champion	Opponent	Result
2010 - Portuguese Bowl I	Lisbon Navigators	Paredes Lumberjacks	45-26
2011 - Portuguese Bowl II	Lisbon Navigators	Paredes Lumberjacks	38-27
2012 - Portuguese Bowl III	Lisbon Navigators	Maximinos Warriors	25-7
2013 - Portuguese Bowl IV	Lisbon Navigators	Porto Mutts	20-12
2014 - Portuguese Bowl V	Lisbon Navigators	Maximinos Warriors	34-7
2015 - Portuguese Bowl VI	Lisbon Navigators	Crusaders American Football Team	34-7
