= SAAF =

SAAF may refer to:

== Military ==
- Saudi Arabian Air Force
- Saudi Arabian Armed Forces
- Small Arms Ammunition Factory, munitions factories run by the Australian Government
- South African Air Force
- South Arabian Air Force
- Syrian Arab Air Force

== Other uses ==
- SAAF (railway), a Romanian company
- Saaf (surname), list of people with the surname
- Slovak Association of American Football
- South Asian Athletics Federation
