= Max Pircher =

Italian gridiron football player (born 1999)

No. 67 – Houston Texans
- Position: Offensive tackle
- Roster status: Practice squad

Personal information
- Born: 7 September 1999 (age 27); Brixen, Italy
- Listed height: 6 ft 7 in (2.01 m)
- Listed weight: 320 lb (145 kg)

Career information
- College: Hildesheim
- NFL draft: 2021: undrafted

Career history
- Swarco Raiders Tirol (2019); Los Angeles Rams (2021–2022)*; Detroit Lions (2023)*; Seattle Seahawks (2024)*; Washington Commanders (2024)*; Minnesota Vikings (2025)*; Houston Texans (2026–present)*
- * Offseason or practice squad member only

Awards and highlights
- Super Bowl champion (LVI); 2019 Austrian Bowl champion; 2019 CEFL Bowl champion
- Stats at Pro Football Reference

Maximilian Pircher (born September 7, 1999) is an Italian professional American football offensive tackle for the Houston Texans. He began his professional career with the Swarco Raiders Tirol in the Austrian Football League in 2019 and signed with the Los Angeles Rams of the National Football League (NFL) in 2021 as part of the International Player Pathway program. Pircher has also been a member of the Detroit Lions, Seattle Seahawks, Washington Commanders, and Minnesota Vikings.

== Early career ==
Pircher started playing and developing football for the Hildesheim Invaders club in Germany.

== Professional career ==
Pre-draft measurables
| Height | Weight | Arm length | Hand span | Wingspan | 40-yard dash | 10-yard split | 20-yard split | 20-yard shuttle | Three-cone drill | Vertical jump | Broad jump | Bench press |
|---|---|---|---|---|---|---|---|---|---|---|---|---|
| 6 ft 7 5/8 in (2.02 m) | 309 lb (140 kg) | 33 1/2 in (0.85 m) | 9 3/4 in (0.25 m) | 6 ft 11 1/2 in (2.12 m) | 5.57 s | 1.96 s | 3.32 s | 4.78 s | 8.22 s | 31.5 in (0.80 m) | 8 ft 10 in (2.69 m) | 22 reps |
All values from Pro Day

=== Swarco Raiders Tirol ===
Pircher's pro football career began in 2019 with the Swarco Raiders Tirol in the Austrian Football League (AFL). He played right tackle, eventually winning the 2019 Central European Football League (CEFL) and the 2019 Austrian Bowl (AFL) championships with the Raiders.

=== Los Angeles Rams ===
In May 2021, the Los Angeles Rams signed Pircher as part of the NFL's International Player Pathway Program, making him the second member of the Tirol Raiders to join the NFL through the pathway program after Sandro Platzgummer. Pircher was a member of the Ram's practice squad for two seasons, including their victory in Super Bowl LVI, making Pircher a Super Bowl champion.

=== Detroit Lions ===
On May 29, 2023, Pircher was signed by the Detroit Lions as part of the 2023 International Player Pathway Program. He was released on August 29 during final roster cuts and signed to the practice squad the next day. He was not signed to a reserve/future contract after the season and thus became a free agent when his practice squad contract expired.

=== Seattle Seahawks ===
On April 9, 2024, Pircher was signed by the Seattle Seahawks. He was waived on August 27, and re-signed to the practice squad, but was released a few days later.

=== Washington Commanders ===
Pircher was signed to the Washington Commanders' practice squad on January 1, 2025. He was released on January 7 and re-signed the following day.

=== Minnesota Vikings ===
Pircher was signed to the Minnesota Vikings practice squad on August 27, 2025.

=== Houston Texans ===
On September 3, 2026, Pircher was signed to the Houston Texans' practice squad after a successful workout.
