= Maribor (disambiguation) =

Maribor is a city in Slovenia.

Maribor may also refer to:

- Maribor Edvard Rusjan Airport
- Maribor Generals, an American football club.
- NK Maribor, an association football club.
- Roman Catholic Archdiocese of Maribor
- Žametovka or Maribor vine, a red wine grape variety
