= Fehérvár Enthroners =

American football team in Hungary

- Current season
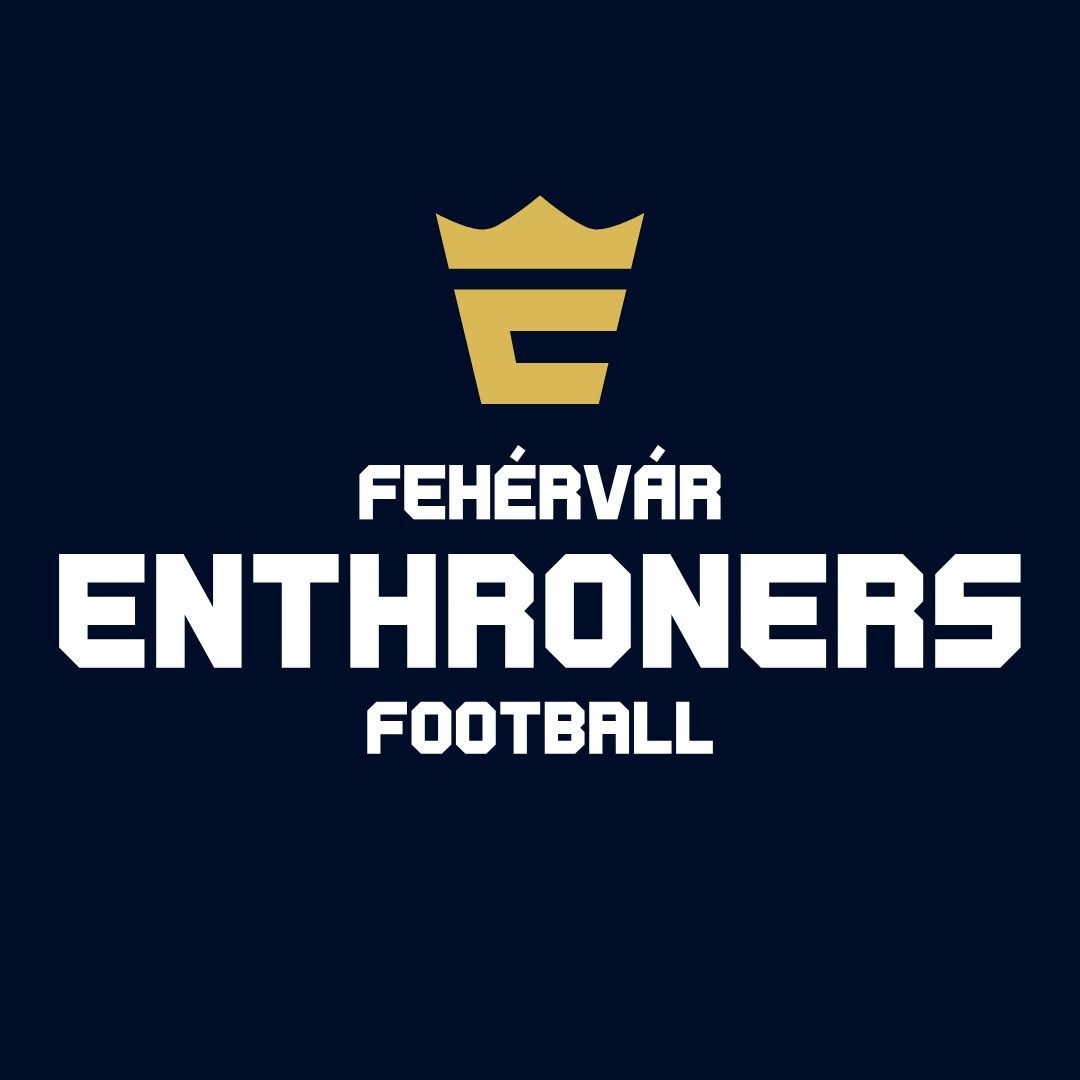
- Logo
- Uniforms

General information
- Founded: 2007; 19 years ago
- Stadium: First Field
- Headquartered: Székesfehérvár, Hungary
- Colors: Blue, Gold and White
- Website: enthroners.hu

Personnel
- General manager: Viktor Bóka
- Head coach: Augie Stevens

League / conference affiliations
- AFL

Championships
- Hungarian Bowl: 0; 2 (2019, 2022)

The Fehérvár Enthroners are an American football team from Székesfehérvár, Hungary, established in 2007. The Enthroners will compete in the Austrian Football League (AFL) in 2026.

Previously they played in the Hungarian Football League and won the Hungarian Bowl two times. Since 2018 the club has a team in the lower divisions of the Austrian Football League, where they had an unbeaten record from 2018 until early 2023.

== History ==
After establishing in 2007, the team participated in the lowest league without noticeable success until 2015, reaching play-off for the first time.

In 2016 a new football program started: the team moved to First Field, the first Hungarian American football stadium, and finished runners-up in tier 3, promoted into tier 2. In 2017 the Enthroners won Division I undefeated, and since then they participate in the HFL. In 2018 they finished in the 5th place, but in 2019, after finishing 3rd place in the regular season, they won Hungarian Bowl XIV. In 2021 they lost the final after an undefeated regular season, but in 2022 they won the HFL undefeated.

Since 2018 the Enthroners are participating in the Austrian lower leagues. By the rules they had to compete in Divisions 4, 3 and 2, before promoting to Division 1 (second highest division in Austria). Despite the winning lower divisions the Austrian Federation did not allowed to skip any divisions, so Enthroners had to play in all 4 lower tiers. As the since 2022 the Austrian Federation does not allow to promote teams into top level AFL to stabilize the 10 participating teams' positions, Enthroners were not allowed to play in the top division.

In 2021 they entered the Central European Football League, but because of the Covid-related travel issues the Calanda Broncos won the match without playing.

In 2022 the team participated in the CEFL Cup, won the Southern group and entered the final against Prague Lions. With a 24:20 victory on their home field they won the title.

=== European League of Football ===
On May 13, 2022, during a press conference it was announced than the Enthroners will enter the European League of Football in 2023. Jamie Hill continued to be the team's head coach. In addition, the Enthroners second team continued to play in the AFL Division 1. After three defeats in the first three games, the Enthroners fired [3] The Hungarians also struggled both under quarterback Jerod Evans and his successor Kevin Doyle. They received two victories at the green table, after the Prague Lions had canceled the game in Fehervar, and the Leipzig Kings withdrew from the league. On 19. August 2023, the Enthroners were able to celebrate the first victory on the field: 19–3 against the Lions in front of their own audience. A week later, the Enthroners were on the verge of the big sensation: against the reigning champion Vienna Vikings they lost by only one point less. After the 3–9 season, the Enthroners parted ways with Head Coach Hill.

In the spring of 2024, the franchise founded the Fehérvár Enthroners American Football Academy. In this newly founded junior center, young players are to receive both football and school education. The academy will also provide the team in the AFL Division I. The previous offensive coordinator Joe Ashfield took over as head coach. Jack Mangel, Concord University Mountain Lions, was signed as quarterback. In the 2024 season, the Enthroners won two home wins against the Prague Lions and the Milano Seamen, and were ranked 4th in the Eastern Conference.

Head coach for the 2025 season is Mark Ridgle, previously with the Madrid Bravos. The Enthroners struggled to 1–11 record, only defeating the Berlin Thunder 34–31 in overtime in the penultimate game of the season. Despite the team's weak season, Enthroners' wide receiver Jon Cole, who signed with the team mid-season, was named 2025 Comeback Player of the Year, while defensive back Aleksander Borkovic was awarded 2025 Homegrown Player of the Year.

Following the conclusion of the 2025 season, the Enthroners announced via their Facebook page that they would not be returning to the ELF in 2026, and had accepted an invitation by the American Football Bund Österreich to play in the Austrian Football League.

== Season summary ==
=== Hungarian championship ===
Year	Division	Finish	Games	W	L	PF	PA	Postseason
2009	Div III	7th	4	1	3	105	150	—
2010	Div II	3rd	6	4	2	170	34	—
2011	Div II	10th	5	0	5	45	127	—
2014	Div II	11th	4	0	4	47	104	—
2015	Div II	5th	4	2	2	60	79	Lost WC: Zala Predators (7–14)
2016	Div II	2nd	4	4	0	116	14	Won SF: Dabas Sparks (53–12) Lost DB VIII: Budapest Eagles (13–35)
2017	Div I	1st	7	7	0	248	45	Won PB XI: Budapest Eagles (28–7)
2018	HFL	5th	7	2	5	123	210	—
2019	HFL	3rd	5	3	2	117	67	Won WC: Miskolc Steelers (33–28) Won SF: Budapest Cowbells (16–13) Won HB: Kyiv Capitals (14–12)
2021	HFL	1st	4	4	0	109	21	Lost HB: Budapest Wolves (7–18)
2022	HFL	1st	4	4	0	150	51	Won SF: Miskolc Steelers (26–13) Won HB: Budapest Wolves (31–24)

- WC = Wild card
- SF = Semi finals
- HB = Hungarian Bowl
- PB = Pannon Bowl
- DB = Duna Bowl

=== Austrian championship ===
Year	Division	Finish	Games	W	L	PF	PA	Postseason
2018	Div 4 (Group B)	1st	6	6	0	302	6	Won SF: Wörgl Warriors (75–0) Won MB IV: Upper Styrian Rhinos (44–6)
2019	Div 3 (Group B)	1st	8	8	0	276	24	Won SF: Pinzgau Celtics (37–6) Won CB XVI: Upper Styrian Rhinos (32–6)
2021	Div 2 (Group A)	1st	6	6	0	274	35	Won SF: Styrian Hurricanes (70–0) Lost IB XIII: Schwaz Hammers (no game)
2022	Div 1 (Group A)	1st	8	8	0	262	38	Won SF: Hohenems Blue Devils (49–18) Won SB: Amstetten Thunder (42–7)
2023	Div 1 (Group A)	4th	8	1	7	59	232	–
2024	Div 1	6th	8	5	3	207	176	Lost WC: Vienna Knights (0–18)

- SF = Semi finals
- MB = Mission Bowl
- CB = Challenge Bowl
- IB = Iron Bowl
- SB = Silver Bowl

=== International ===
Year	Division	Finish	Games	W	L	PF	PA	Postseason
2021	CEFL	-	-	-	-	-	-	Lost QF Calanda Broncos (no game)
2022	CEFL Cup (South)	1.	1	1	0	34	12	Won F: Prague Lions (24–20)

=== European League of Football ===
Year	Division	Finish	Games	W	L	PF	PA	Postseason
2023	ELF (East)	4.	12	3	9	218	422	–
2024	ELF (East)	4.	12	2	10	168	422	–
2025	ELF (East)	4.	12	1	11	184	509	-

- QF = Quarter finals
- F = Final

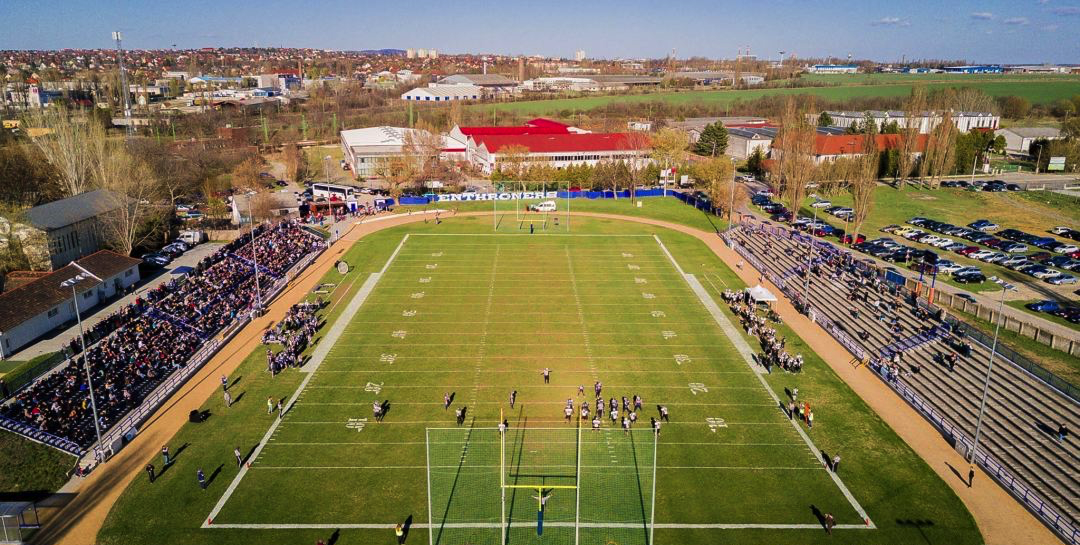
The Enthroners' home, the First Field in 2017

== First Field ==
First Field is the home of the Enthroners, as well as hosting select matches for the national team. It was built in 2016 in parallel with the reconstruction of the Sóstói Stadion, and sits on the site formerly occupied by MÁV Előre SC's stadium. Its name is derived from being Hungary's first, and to date, only stadium built specifically for American football.

== Team identity ==
The name Enthroners is a reference to the history of Szekesfehervar, as the city was the coronation and burial place of Hungarian kings from the 10th to the 16th Century.

== See also ==
- Hungarian American Football League
- Austrian Football League
- Central European Football League
