= Kevin Burke (quarterback) =

American football player and coach (born 1993)

Current position
- Title: Running backs coach
- Team: UC Davis
- Conference: Big Sky

Biographical details
- Born: February 24, 1993 (age 33); Westlake, Ohio, U.S.
- Education: University of Mount Union (2015)

Playing career
- 2011–2014: Mount Union
- 2015: United States national team
- 2017–2018: Dacia Vienna Vikings
- 2019: Memphis Express
- 2019: Bern Grizzlies
- Position: Quarterback

Coaching career (HC unless noted)
- 2015–2016: Mount Union (assistant)
- 2017: Case Western Reserve (RB)
- 2018: Case Western Reserve (QB)
- 2019: Case Western Reserve (PGC/QB)
- 2020: Mount Union (QB)
- 2021: UC Davis (OQC)
- 2022–present: UC Davis (RB)

Accomplishments and honors

Championships
- Austrian Bowl (2017)

Awards
- Austrian Bowl Game MVP (2017); Gagliardi Trophy (2013, 2014); D3Football.com Offensive Player of the Year (2013)
Medal record
Men's American football
Representing United States
World Championship
Gold medal – first place	2015 USA	Team competition

Kevin Burke (born February 24, 1993) is an American college football coach and former quarterback. He played college football for Mount Union where he was a two-time winner of the Gagliardi Trophy and won the NCAA Division III championship.

Burke played professionally in Europe for the Dacia Vikings in the Austrian Football League, the Memphis Express in the Alliance of American Football, as well as the Bern Grizzlies in Nationalliga A.

Burke previously coached for Mount Union, Case Western Reserve, and is the running backs coach for UC Davis, a position he has held since 2022.

== Early life ==
Burke led St. Edward High School to the 2010 OHSAA Division I state title, defeating Braxton Miller-led Huber Heights Wayne 35–28.

== College career ==
Burke led the Mount Union football team to three national championship games, winning in 2012 and losing in 2013 and 2014.

In 2013 and 2014, Burke won the Gagliardi Trophy, the award for most outstanding NCAA Division III college football player of the year, becoming the first junior winner and the first two-time winner.

=== Statistics ===
Year	Team	Games		Passing								Rushing			
Year	Team	GP	Record	Comp	Att	Pct	Yards	Avg	TD	Int	Rate	Att	Yards	Avg	TD
2011	Mount Union	DNP													
2012	Mount Union	15	15–0	249	359	69.4	3,772	10.5	38	7	188.6	138	776	5.6	9
2013	Mount Union	15	14–1	234	368	63.6	3,830	10.4	44	9	185.6	195	1,025	5.3	14
2014	Mount Union	15	14–1	290	452	64.2	4,412	9.8	52	9	180.1	117	599	5.1	10
Career		45	43−2	773	1,179	65.6	12,014	10.2	134	25	184.4	450	2,400	5.3	33

== Professional career ==
After his college career, Burke became a member of the United States national team for the 2015 IFAF World Championship, whom he led to the gold medal.

In 2017, he joined the Vienna Vikings of the Austrian Football League. That year, he recorded 2,990 passing yards (second-most in the league) and 36 touchdown passes as he led the Vikings to the Austrian Bowl championship. Against the Swarco Raiders, he threw for 375 yards and three touchdowns and recorded 121 rushing yards as the Vikings won 45–26; Burke earned game MVP honors for his performance. He also played for the Vikings in 2018 taking the team Austrian Bowl before losing to the Raiders.

Burke was signed by the Memphis Express of the Alliance of American Football (AAF) on February 21, 2019, following the benching of Christian Hackenberg. He was waived on February 27, replaced by Johnny Manziel. The AAF league folded midway through the season.

Later in 2019, Burke signed and played for the Bern Grizzlies of Switzerland Nationalliga A. The Grizzlies lost in the semi-final of the playoffs.

== Coaching career ==
During the 2017 season, Burke became the running backs coach for Case Western Reserve. The Spartans reached the playoffs, where they were eventually eliminated by Burke's alma mater, Mount Union, in the second round. For the 2018 season, he was named quarterbacks coach for Case Western Reserve, and added passing game coordinator to his role in 2019. In 2020, Burke rejoined his alma mater coaching staff as quarterbacks coach. In 2022, after serving as an offensive quality control coach for the UC Davis, he was promoted to running backs coach.
