= Stadium ŠKP Inter Dúbravka =

Football stadium in Dúbravka, Slovakia

Coordinates: 48°10′33″N 17°02′59″E

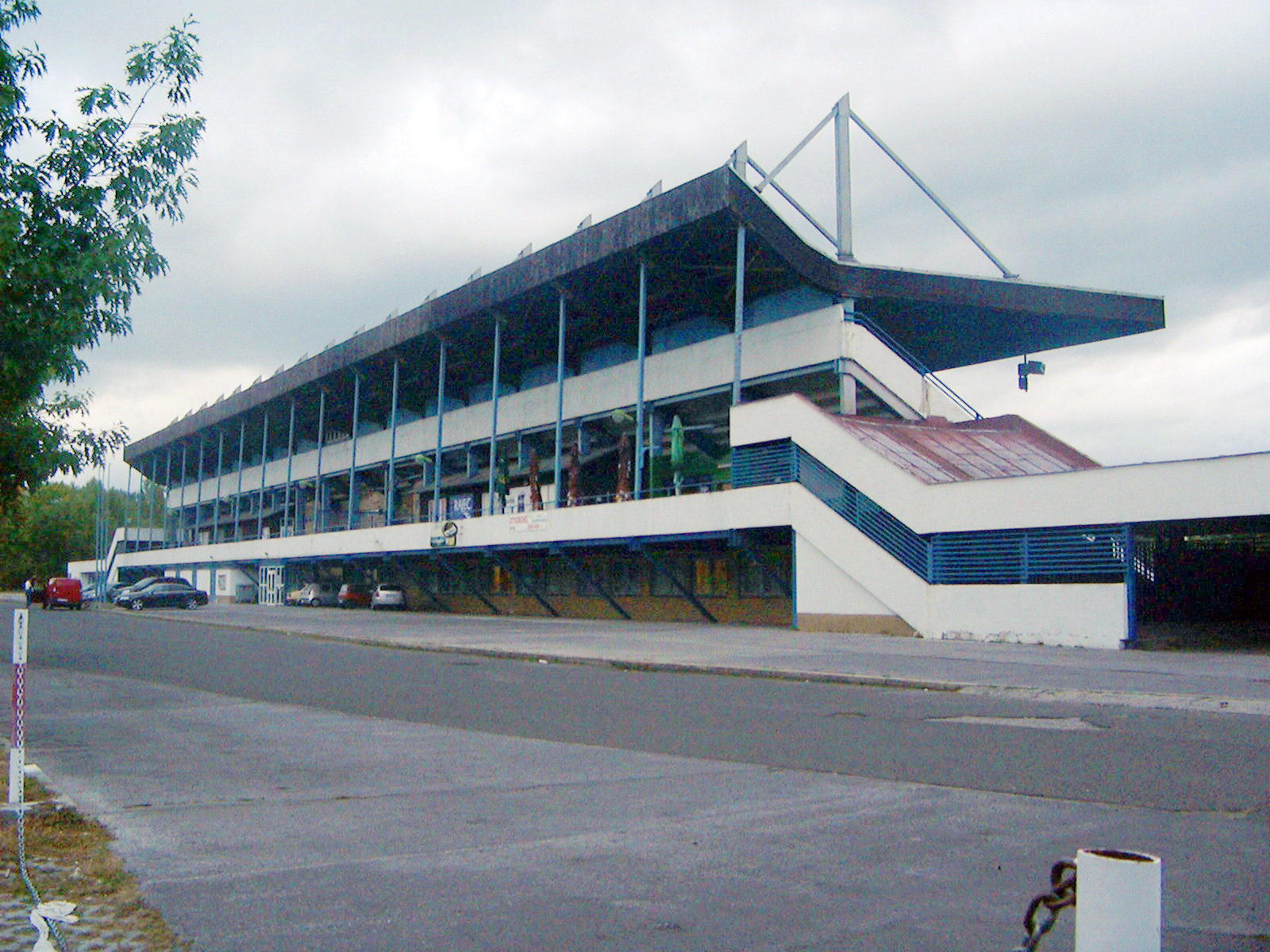
- Interactive map of Stadium ŠKP Inter Dúbravka
- Location: Dúbravka, Slovakia
- Capacity: 5000
- Surface: Grass
- Field size: 100 x 65m

Construction
- Groundbreaking: TBA
- Opened: 1976

Tenants
- FK ŠKP Inter Dúbravka Bratislava (1976–present), FK Inter Bratislava (2014–), Bratislava Monarchs (2014–present)

Stadium ŠKP Inter Dúbravka (Slovak: Štadión ŠKP Inter Dúbravka) is a football stadium in Dúbravka, Slovakia and is the home stadium of the FK Inter Bratislava and FK ŠKP Inter Dúbravka Bratislava. FK Inter Bratislava started playing at the stadium in Summer 2014. Stadium capacity is 5000, including 250 VIP seats. Stadium is currently used by most successful American football team in Slovakia - Bratislava Monarchs.
