= Slovene American Football Association =

- Formation: 2004
- Type: American football
- Headquarters: Domžale, Slovenia

The Slovene American Football Association (Slovene: Zveza za ameriški nogomet Slovenije) is the governing body of the sport of American football in Slovenia. Formed in 2004, the federation oversees the Slovenian Football League.

== History ==
American football in Slovenia began developing in 2002 when the first Slovenian team, the Ljubljana Silverhawks, were formed. Since then, six other tackle teams were formed in different regions of Slovenia, developing gridiron football on a national level.

In 2009–10, the association organized the first edition of the Slovenian Football League, the highest level of gridiron football in Slovenia.
