= Slovak Football League =

American Football League in Slovakia

- Sport: American football
- Founded: 2011
- Founder: Slovak Association of American Football
- No. of teams: 7
- Country: Slovakia
- Most recent champion: Nitra Knights
- Most titles: Bratislava Monarchs (5 titles)
- Website: saaf.sk

The Slovak Football League (Slovak: Slovenská futbalová liga) is a national American football league in Slovakia. The league was founded in 2011 by the Slovak Association of American Football; there are seven teams that compete in the league today.

== Teams ==
- Bratislava Monarchs
- Cassovia Steelers
- Nitra Knights
- Trnava Bulldogs
- Žilina Warriors
- Zvolen Patriots

=== Former teams ===
- Banská Bystrica Daemons
- Smolenice Eagles
- Topoľčany Kings

== Champions ==
Season	Champion	Runner-up	Third Place
2011	Bratislava Monarchs	Nitra Knights	Zvolen Patriots
2012	Bratislava Monarchs	Trnava Bulldogs	Nitra Knights
2013	Smolenice Eagles	Nitra Knights	Bratislava Monarchs
2014	Smolenice Eagles	Žilina Warriors	Zvolen Patriots
2015	Bratislava Monarchs	Trnava Bulldogs	Zvolen Patriots
2016	Trnava Bulldogs	Žilina Warriors	Nitra Knights
2017	Bratislava Monarchs	Žilina Warriors	
2018	Trnava Bulldogs	Žilina Warriors	
2019	Bratislava Monarchs	Nitra Knights	
2021	Nitra Knights	Žilina Warriors	Cassovia Steelers

== Historical Stats ==
Position.	Team	Championships	Runner-up Finishes	Third Place Finishes
1.	Bratislava Monarchs	5 (2011, 2012, 2015, 2017, 2019)		1 (2013)
2.	Trnava Bulldogs	2 (2016, 2018)	2 (2012, 2015)	
3.	Smolenice Eagles	2 (2013, 2014)		
4.	Nitra Knights	1 (2021)	3 (2011, 2013, 2019)	1 (2012)
5.	Žilina Warriors		6 (2014, 2016, 2017, 2018, 2021)	
6.	Zvolen Patriots			3 (2011, 2014, 2015)
7.	Cassovia Steelers			1 (2021)
