= Slovak Association of American Football =

Sports governing body in Slovakia

The Slovak Association of American Football (SAAF) is the governing body of American football in Slovakia. It takes part in the organization of all the competitions related to the Slovak Championship. SAAF is responsible for the expansion and popularization of the sport. In Slovakia, American football is played under the 7v7, 11v11 and flag football variants.

== History ==
The SAAF was formed in the year 2010 by the fusion of the SZAF and SAAF. In 2013, the SAAF became a member of the IFAF. The current president of the association is Ivan Labuda (since January 2014). Until 2013, the SAAF had 9 members:

- Bratislava Monarchs (founded in 1996)
- Nitra Knights (founded in 1997)
- Zvolen Patriots (founded in 2006)
- Trnava Bulldogs (founded in 2007)
- Topoľčany Kings (founded in 2009)
- Smolenice Eagles (founded in 2009)
- Žilina Warriors (founded in 2010)
- Banská Bystrica Daemons (founded in 2009)
- Cassovia Steelers (founded in 2011)

== Slovak Football League 7v7 ==
7v7 is a reduced variant of the original game played with 7 players instead of 11, with just a few adjustments to the original NCAAF rules. The so-called "Little League" has been played so far during the spring season (April–July). However, from the 2014 season, this league will be played during the fall.

== Slovak Champion 7v7 ==
- 2010 (SZAF)-Zvolen Patriots
- 2011-Bratislava Monarchs
- 2012-Bratislava Monarchs
- 2013-Smolenice Eagles

== Slovak Football League 11v11 ==
11v11 is classic American Football based on IFAF rules (NCAA rules). The Slovak 11v11 League was played during the 2011 and 2012 seasons. During the 2013 and 2014 the league will not take place. Due to the small number of teams able to provide an 11-man full roster, these ones are moving into international competitions.

== Slovak Champions 11v11 ==
- 2010 (SZAF)-Zvolen Patriots
- 2011-Bratislava Monarchs
- 2012-Bratislava Monarchs

== Slovak Flag Football League ==
Flag football is a 5-man variation of the non-contact sport based on American football; it is to be played during the early spring season in 2014.

== National team ==
The national team is under the scope of the SAAF. Up to 2013 it had played 3 games, with an average attendance of around 3000 people.

== Statistics ==
First game

- Czech Republic 24:14 Slovakia (Prague, 8 August 2010)

Further games

- Slovakia 24:30 Slovenia (Nitra, 16 September 2012, 3000 spectators)
- Slovakia 6:38 Czech Republic (Bratislava, 18 August 2013, 3000 spectators)

Team	G	W	T	L	GV	GI	+/−
Czech Republic	2	0	0	2	20	62	−42
Slovenia	1	0	0	1	24	30	−6
Sum	3	0	0	3	44	92	−48
