= Darius Saint-Robinson =

American football player (born 1991)

Profile
- Positions: Defensive back, return specialist

Personal information
- Born: November 17, 1991 (age 34); College Park, Georgia, U.S.
- Listed height: 5 ft 10 in (1.78 m)
- Listed weight: 175 lb (79 kg)

Career information
- High school: Westlake (Atlanta, Georgia)
- College: Clemson (2010–2013)
- NFL draft: 2014: undrafted

Career history
- Buffalo Bills (2014)*; New Yorker Lions (2018); Raiders Tirol (2019); Las Rozas Black Demons (2021); Panthers Wrocław (2021–2022); Munich Ravens (2023–2024); Helvetic Mercenaries (2024)
- * Offseason or practice squad member only

Darius Saint-Robinson (born November 17, 1991) is an American former professional football cornerback who played four seasons in the European League of Football.

== Early life ==
Darius Robinson attended North Clayton High School for his freshman and sophomore year and then transferred to the well known Westlake High School where he graduated. He was a letterman in football and basketball and finished high school as a four-star All-American in football in 2010.

== College career ==
Robinson, one of the nations top prospects committed and signed to Clemson University. During his time at Clemson he won four NCAA championships and was named team captain his senior year in 2013.

== Professional career ==
Pre-draft measurables
Height	Weight	Arm length	Hand span	Wingspan	40-yard dash	10-yard split	20-yard split	20-yard shuttle	Three-cone drill	Vertical jump	Broad jump	Bench press
5 ft 10 in (1.78 m)	181 lb (82 kg)	30 in (0.76 m)	8 3/8 in (0.21 m)	6 ft 0 in (1.83 m)	4.54 s	1.58 s	2.63 s	4.26 s	6.93 s	30.0 in (0.76 m)	9 ft 6 in (2.90 m)	9 reps
All values from Pro Day

=== Buffalo Bills ===
In 2014, Robinson signed a three-year contract as a undrafted free agent with the Buffalo Bills for $1,532,000. He suffered a severe shoulder injury in training camp and was released from the team.

=== European football ===
In 2018, Robinson signed with the New Yorker Lions in the German Football League for the 2018 season. He won his first European Championship in his first year by competing and winning the Eurobowl title. In 2019, Robinson went to the Austrian Football League where he added league and European (CEFL) championships to his resume with the Swarco Raiders Tirol. From 2021 to 2022 Robinson played for the Wroclaw Panthers in Poland who were competing in the 2021 season, where he was honored with AFI's All-Europe 1st-Team award and 2022 with being named an ELF all-star. Darius Saint-Robinson is now a part of the Munich Ravens franchise based in Munich, Germany.

=== ELF statistics ===
Year	Team	GP	Tackles						Interceptions				
Year	Team	GP	Cmb	Solo	Ast	TFL	Yds	Sck	FF	PD	Int	Yds	TD
European League of Football
2021	Panthers Wrocław	10	28	14	14	3		0	1	8	3	108	1
2022	Panthers Wrocław	11	31	16	15	1		0	1	5	0	0	0
2023	Munich Ravens	0	0	0	0	0	0	0	0	0	0	0	0
ELF total		21	59	30	29	4		0	2	13	3	108	1
Source: europeanleague.football
