= Charles Drake (American football) =

American football player (1981–2012)

Profile
- Position: Safety

Personal information
- Born: September 25, 1981
- Died: July 6, 2012 (aged 30)
- Listed height: 6 ft 1 in (1.85 m)
- Listed weight: 205 lb (93 kg)

Career information
- College: Michigan
- NFL draft: 2003: 7th round, 240th overall pick

Career history
- New York Giants (2003)*; Detroit Lions (2003–2004)*; Rhein Fire (2004)
- * Offseason or practice squad member only

Charles Edward Drake III (September 5, 1981 – July 6, 2012) was an American football player. He was selected by the New York Giants in the seventh round of the 2003 NFL draft after playing college football for the Michigan Wolverines. Drake played professionally in the Austrian Football League and NFL Europe.

== Early life ==
A native of Los Angeles, Drake played high school football at Westchester High School, where he was selected as an all-city running back.

== College career ==
Drake committed to play college football at the University of Michigan as part of the incoming class of 1999. He played at Michigan from 1999 to 2002. He was converted to a defensive back as a sophomore in 2000. He was the starting safety in nine games for the 2001 Michigan team and a starter at cornerback in 13 games for the 2002 team.

After his senior year at Michigan, Drake was selected to participate in the 2003 NFL Combine.

== Professional career ==
He was selected by the New York Giants in the seventh round of the 2003 NFL draft but was released by the Giants in late August 2003, prior to the start of the regular season. He was signed the Detroit Lions in December 2003 as a member of the team's practice squad. He remained with the team through the 2004 exhibition season. He was released by the Lions during the first week of September 2004. That fall, he played at the safety position for the Rhein Fire of the NFL Europe. He also played for the Frankfurt Galaxy of the NFL Europe and the Cineplexx Blue Devils of the Austrian Football League.

== Personal life ==
Drake died in July 2012 at age 30. He had a son, Charles Drake IV, and a daughter named Milaan Drake.
