= Hugh Mendez =

American football and baseball player and coach

Biographical details
- Born: 1935
- Died: 2013 (aged 77–78)

Playing career

Football
- 1957: Springfield

Baseball
- 1957–1958: Springfield
- 1958: McCook Braves
- 1959: Yakima Braves
- Positions: Halfback (football); Pitcher (baseball)

Coaching career (HC unless noted)

Football
- 1980–1989: Whittier

Baseball
- 1971–1987: Whittier

Head coaching record
- Overall: 52–44 (football)

Accomplishments and honors

Championships
- Football; 2 SCIAC (1981–1982)

Hugh Brooks Mendez (1935 – 2013) was an American football and baseball player and coach. He served as the head baseball coach at Whittier College in Whittier, California from 1971 to 1987. He also served as Whittier's head football coach from 1980 to 1989, winning two conference championships

Hugh B.Mendez stadium was dedicated in his honor by Whittier College in 2018. Mendez was also inducted to the Whittier College Athletic Hall of Fame.

== Overseas Europe ==
Mendez coached American football for well over a decade from the mid-1980s, 1990's into the early 2000s in several European countries including teams in the Austrian Football League, German Football League, Finland Vaahteraliiga, and in the Italian Football League.

The legendary Mendez won league championships as a head coach in multiple countries including, the 1993 Austrian Bowl title with the Feldkirch Dinos, the 1985 Finnish Maple Bowl Vaahteraliiga with Vantaa Taft, and won the first Eurobowl championship in 1986 with Taft Vantaa from Finland. Mendez also won an Italian League Championship.

Mendez also conducted coaching clinics throughout Europe, and wrote coaching books and manuals.

== Head coaching record ==
Year	Team	Overall	Conference	Standing	Bowl/playoffs
Whittier Poets (Southern California Intercollegiate Athletic Conference) (1980–1989)
1980	Whittier	5–5	3–2	3rd	
1981	Whittier	6–4	5–0	1st	
1982	Whittier	6–3	4–1	T–1st	
1983	Whittier	7–2	4–1	2nd	
1984	Whittier	6–4	3–1–1 (Note: From 1984 to 1990, the Southern California Intercollegiate Athletic Conference (SCIAC) football schedule included multiple head-to-head meetings each season. In 1984 and 1985, each conference member played two other conference members twice. From 1986 to 1990, each conference member played one other conference member twice. A head-to-head sweep of the two games in one season counted as one win for the winner and one loss for the loser in the conference standings. A split of the two games counted as a tie for each team.)	2nd	
1985	Whittier	7–3	3–1–1	2nd	
1986	Whittier	5–5	2–2–1	4th	
1987	Whittier	4–6	1–3–1	T–4th	
1988	Whittier	3–6	2–2–1	3rd	
1989	Whittier	3–6	2–2–1	4th	
Whittier:		52–44	29–15–6		
Total:		52–44			
National championship Conference title Conference division title or championship game berth
