= Zala Predators =

The Zala Predators or ZP for short, are an American football team based in the west of Hungary in the provincial town of Zalaegerszeg. They play in MAFL Veritas Division II and are a member of the nearly 20-team-strong Hungarian American Football League. Founded in 2004, the club played their first game against Nagykanizsa Demons in August 2005.

Since then, the club has grown and boasts a growing Booster Club, a development Junior team and a Cheerleading team.

ZP play in the West Division II group. The ZP defense are called 'A Kutya' which is Hungarian for 'The Dogs'. The ZP offense are called 'Pancélos' which is Hungarian for 'Armour'.

== Game history ==
Game Type	Home	Score	Away	Score	Date	Result	Location
Friendship	Predators	0	Demons	42	Aug-05	Loss	Teskand
Friendship	Wolves II	22	Predators	15	Sep-05	Loss	Budapest
Friendship	Black Knights	30	Predators	6	Nov-05	Loss	Budapest
Friendship	Predators	6	Stallions	53	Apr-06	Loss	Teskand
MAFL Div I	Demons	57	Predators	19	Apr-06	Loss	Nagykanizsa
MAFL Div I	Predators	7	Black Knights	27	May-06	Loss	Teskand
MAFL Div I	Gladiators	66	Predators	20	Jun-06	Loss	Debrecen
Friendship	Cowboys	51	Predators	7	Aug-06	Loss	Budapest
Friendship	Predators	19	Tigers	12	Nov-06	Win	Zalaegerszeg
MAFL Div II	Vipers	32	Predators	14	Apr-07	Loss	Budapest
MAFL Div II	Predators	36	Gringos	0	May-07	Win	Zalaegerszeg
MAFL Div II	Heroes	12	Predators	19	May-07	Win	Eger
MAFL Div II	Predators	17	Wild Fire	7	Jun-07	Win	Zalaegerszeg
Friendship	Predators	74	Bulldogs	0	Oct-07	Win	Zalaegerszeg
Friendship	Predators	20	Demons	0	Mar-08	Win	Zalaegerszeg
MAFL Div II	Predators	27	Wild Fire	6	Mar-08	Win	Zalaegerszeg
MAFL Div II	Predators	27	Steelers	12	May-08	Win	Zalaegerszeg
MAFL Div II	Gringos	6	Predators	33	May-08	Win	Pécs
