= Prague Black Panthers =

Professional American football team in the Czech Republic

- Founded: 1991; 35 years ago, as the Prague Panthers
- League: Austrian Football League; Czech League of American Football
- Based in: Prague, Czech Republic
- Stadium: Stadion SK Prosek
- Colors: Black, White and Silver
- President: Pavel Poříz
- Head coach: Spencer Ford
- Manager: David Krejbich
- Championships: 1994–1996; 1999–2003; 2007–2010 (as Prague Panthers); 2013–2018 (as Prague Black Panthers) 2024 AFL Champions
- Website: pragueblackpanthers.com

The Prague Black Panthers (formerly the Prague Panthers) are an American football team based in Prague, Czech Republic founded in 1991. The Prague Black Panthers are one of the most successful teams in Central Europe, having been named the Champions of the Czech Republic 18 times (1994–1996, 1999–2003, 2007–2010 as the Panthers, and 2013–2018 as the Black Panthers). After years of dominance in the Czech League of American Football, the Black Panthers have since 2010 also competed as members of the Austrian Football League (AFL).

Since 2019 the Panthers have only been members of the (AFL) choosing not to compete in the Czech league. Internationally the team has played in the European Football League (EFL) and the EFAF Cup and also in Central European Football League (CEFL).

== Successes ==
=== Czech League ===
- (Czech Bowl) Czech Republic Champions (1994–1996, 1999–2003, 2007–2010 as the Prague Panthers, 2013–2018 as the Prague Black Panthers)

=== International ===
- EFAF Cup
  - Winners (2009)
  - Semifinals (2008)
- Winners of German Bowl Ost (1994)
- Winners of Prague International Bowl (1998)

=== Austrian Football League ===
- Winners of Austrian Bowl (2024)
- Semi-finals (2014, 2015, 2019, 2022, 2023)
