= Czech League of American Football =

American football competition in the Czech Republic

Czech League of American Football (Česká Liga Amerického Fotbalu)
- Snapbacks liga
- Sport: American football
- Founded: 1994; 32 years ago
- Founder: Czech American Football Association (ČAAF)
- First season: 1994
- CEO: Lukas Baros
- No. of teams: 26 (6 in Division 1, 5 in Division 2, 8 in Division 3, and 7 in Division 4)
- Country: Czech Republic
- Most recent champion: Vysočina Gladiators
- Most titles: Prague Black Panthers (18 titles)
- Website: CAAF Online

The Czech League of American Football (ČLAF) (Czech: Česká Liga Amerického Fotbalu), known as the Snapbacks liga for sponsorship reasons, is a national American football competition in the Czech Republic. First held in 1994, it is organised by the Czech American Football Association (ČAAF).

== Seasonal structure ==
Location of the Teams

=== Divisions ===
Next to the "Paddock League" which is the first Division in Czech American Football there is in 2019; 5 more Divisions in Men's and 1 Division in Ladies' Football. The Trnava Bulldogs (from Trnava in Slovakia) are the only non-Czech participant in 2019.

League	year	Teams
Paddock League	2019	Příbram Bobcats, Prague Lions, Trnava Bulldogs (SK), Ostrava Steelers, Pardubice Stallions, Ústí nad Labem Blades
Division 2	2019	Prague Hippos, Pilsen Patriots, Brno Sígrs, Přerov Mammoths, Brno Alligators, Příbram Bobcats,
Division 3 – North	2019	Hradec Králové Dragons, Prague Mustangs, Liberec Titans, Trutnov Rangers
Division 3 – South	2019	Přerov Mammoths, Vysočina Gladiators, Budweis Hellboys, East Bohemia Bucks
Division 4 – West	2019	Prague Black Panthers 2, Teplice Nordians, Tabor Foxes
Division 4 – East	2019	Brno Sígrs 2, Šumperk Dietos, Třinec Sharks, Zlín Golems
Women's	2017	Brno Amazons, Prague Black Cats, Prague Harpies

== Format ==
=== Regular season ===
Divisions 1 and 2 uses a round-robin tournament system. Similar to Divisions 1 and 2, Division 3 also uses a same round-robin tournament system.

=== Playoffs ===
A semifinal bracket as follows 1. vs 4. and 2. vs 3., deciding the semifinals winners advanced into the finals. Whoever wins the semifinals, the team must advanced into the championship game, the Czech Bowl. Divisions 2 and 3 also has the final game, the Silver Bowl and the Bronze Bowl respectively, while Division 4 has the same championship game, the Iron Bowl, as the ČAAF does that.

=== Other information ===
In ČLAF A, a team must have 12 minutes, 10 minutes in ČLAF B and 4x8 minutes in ČLAF C. All games use the International Federation of American Football rule book.

== ČLAF winners ==
=== Czech Bowl winners ===
The Czech Bowl is the national American football game of the Czech Republic, where it had been held since 1995 after the Prague Panthers won the regular season championship when it swept the said season in 1994, the year the Czech Bowl was not held.

Bowl	Year	Champion	Runner-up	Score
I	1994	Prague Panthers	—	—
II	1995	Prague Panthers	Prague Lions	55–22
III	1996	Prague Panthers	Ostrava Steelers	48–30
IV	1997	Ostrava Steelers	Prague Panthers	35-21
V	1998	Prague Lions	Prague Panthers	29–8
VI	1999	Prague Panthers	Prague Lions	38–0
VII	2000	Prague Panthers	Prague Lions	15–13
VIII	2001	Prague Panthers	Brno Alligators	35–13
IX	2002	Prague Panthers	Brno Alligators	52–14
X	2003	Prague Panthers	Prague Lions	23–14
XI	2004	Prague Lions	Prague Panthers	13–3
XII	2005	Prague Lions	Prague Panthers	24–9
XIII	2006	Prague Lions	Bratislava Monarchs	38–21
XIV	2007	Prague Panthers	Prague Lions	28–13
XV	2008	Prague Panthers	Prague Lions	24–14
XVI	2009	Prague Panthers	Prague Lions	24–14
XVII	2010	Prague Panthers	Prague Black Hawks	74–0
XVIII	2011	Prague Black Hawks	Prague Panthers	32–31
XIX	2012	Prague Black Hawks	Prague Panthers	35–34
XX	2013	Prague Black Panthers	Prague Lions	48–9
XXI	2014	Prague Black Panthers	Příbram Bobcats	40–0
XXII	2015	Prague Black Panthers	Příbram Bobcats	52–13
XXIII	2016	Prague Black Panthers	Prague Lions	10–9
XXIV	2017	Prague Black Panthers	Ostrava Steelers	28–0
XXV	2018	Prague Black Panthers	Ostrava Steelers	30–7
XXVI	2019	Prague Lions	Ostrava Steelers	29–23
XXVII	2020	Season canceled because of the COVID-19 pandemic		
XXVIII	2021	Vysočina Gladiators	Prague Lions	23–0
XXIX	2022	Prague Lions	Vysočina Gladiators	35–29
XXX	2023	Vysočina Gladiators	Ostrava Steelers	42–28
XXXI	2024	Nitra Knights	Znojmo Knights	35–28
XXXII	2025	Vysočina Gladiators	Ostrava Steelers	60–10
XXXIII	2026	Vysočina Gladiators	Nitra Knights	32–6

=== Czech Bowl statistics ===
Rank	Team	Titles		Participations	
1	Prague Black Panthers	18	1994–1996, 1999–2003, 2007–2010, 2013–2018	23	1995–2005, 2007–2018
2	Prague Lions	6	1998, 2004–2006, 2019, 2022	15	1995, 1998–2000, 2003–2009, 2013, 2016, 2019, 2021
3	Vysočina Gladiators	5	2021, 2023, 2025, 2026	4	2021–2023, 2025
4	Prague Black Hawks	2	2011, 2012	3	2010–2012
5	Ostrava Steelers	1	1997	7	1996, 1997, 2017, 2018, 2019, 2023, 2025
6	Nitra Knights	1	2024	2	2024, 2026
7	Příbram Bobcats	0	–	2	2014, 2015
7	Brno Alligators	0	–	2	2001, 2002
9	Bratislava Monarchs	0	–	1	2006
9	Znojmo Knights	0	–	1	2024

=== Silver Bowl titleholders ===
Team	Times	Years
4x	Pardubice Stallions	2010–2011, 2015, 2023
3x	Brno Alligators	2006–2007, 2017
2x	Pilsen Patriots	2013, 2024
2x	Třinec Sharks	2021–2022
1x	Přerov Mammoths	2019
1x	Ústí nad Labem Blades	2018
1x	Budweis Hellboys	2012
1x	Brno Sígrs	2016

=== Bronze Bowl titleholders ===
Team	Times	Years
3x	Bílovice Sígrs	2012, 2014-2015
1x	Brno Alligators	2016
1x	Přerov Mammoths	2017

=== Iron Bowl titleholders ===
Team	Times	Years
1x	Znojmo Knights	2015
1x	Vysočina Gladiators	2016

=== Rose Bowl titleholders (female) ===
Team	Times	Years
1x	Prague Black Cats	2015
1x	Brno Amazons	2016
