= Liga Portuguesa de Futebol Americano =

- Current season, competition or edition: 2026
- Sport: American football
- Founded: 2009; 17 years ago
- CEO: Eduardo Brito
- No. of teams: 7
- Country: Portugal
- Most recent champion: Lisbon Devils (6th title)
- Most titles: Lisbon Navigators, Lisbon Devils (6 titles)
- Website: https://fpfa.pt/

Liga Portuguesa de Futebol Americano (LPFA) is the name of the top American football league which operates in Portugal.

== History ==
Year	Final Host	Champion	Runner-up	Score
2010	Lisbon	Lisbon Navigators	Paredes Lumberjacks	45–26
2011	Lisbon	Lisbon Navigators	Paredes Lumberjacks	38–27
2012	Braga	Lisbon Navigators	Maximinos Warriors	25–7
2013	Lisbon	Lisbon Navigators	Porto Mutts	20–12
2014	Abrantes	Lisbon Navigators	Maximinos Warriors	34–7
2015	Coimbra	Lisbon Navigators	Crusaders Futebol Americano	32–13
2016	Maia	Lisbon Devils	Algarve Sharks	28–26
2017	Évora	Lisbon Devils	Maia Renegades	40–35
2018	Torres Vedras	Portuscale Dragons	Porto Mutts CFA	6–0
2019	Mafra	Lisbon Devils	Porto Mutts CFA	23–6
2022	Oleiros	Crusaders Futebol Americano	Lisbon Devils	36–20
2023	Figueira da Foz	Crusaders Futebol Americano	Lisbon Devils	27–21
2024	Lisbon	Lisbon Devils	Lisbon Navigators	28–27
2025	Lisbon	Lisbon Devils	Cascais Crusaders	31–15
2026	Mafra	Lisbon Devils	Cascais Crusaders	24–20

== Teams ==
=== 2026 ===
Location of the seven teams in the 2026 season

Team	City	Stadium	Appearances
Braga Warriors	Braga, Braga District	Campo de Jogos da Caseta	13
Cascais Crusaders	Cascais, Lisbon District	Estádio de Futebol Fontaínhas	14
Lisbon Bulldogs	Alvalade, Lisbon District	Complexo Desportivo Mun. São João de Brito	4
Lisbon Devils	Benfica, Lisbon District	Estádio Francisco Lázaro	10
Lisbon Navigators	Alvalade, Lisbon District	Sport Futebol Palmense	14
Maia Mutts CFA	Maia, Porto District	Complexo Municipal de Cutamas	11
Salgueiros Renegades	Campanhã, Porto District	Complexo Desportivo de Campanhã	4

=== Former ===
Team	City	Stadium	Appearances
Algarve Pirates	Portimão, Faro District	Complexo Desportivo da Mexilhoeira Grande	4
Algarve Sharks	Faro, Faro District	Campo Municipal Horta da Areia	7
Black Knights - GDBM	Braga, Braga District	Campo de Jogos da Mata da Ordem	3
Candal Kings	Gaia, Porto District	Estádio Rei Ramiro	1
Canidelo Celtics	Canidelo, Porto District	Parque Jogos Manuel Marques Gomes	1
Évora Eagles	Évora, Évora District	Estádio Sanches Miranda	1
Galicia Black Towers	Teo, Galicia Community	Campo de A Cañoteira	3
Maia Mustangs	Maia, Porto District	Estádio Municipal Dr. José Vieira de Carvalho	3
Maia Renegades	Maia, Porto District	Estádio Municipal Dr. José Vieira de Carvalho	8
Paredes Lumberjacks	Paredes, Porto District	Cidade Desportiva de Paredes	11
Portuscale Dragons	Vila Nova de Gaia, Porto District	Parque Soares dos Reis	1
Santa Iria Wolves	Santa Iria de Azóia, Lisbon District	Clube Futebol Santa Iria	1
Santiago Black Ravens FA	Santiago de Compostela, Galicia Community	Campo Colexiata de Sar	5
