= Slovenian Football League =

American football league of Slovenia

- Sport: American football
- Founded: 2009; 17 years ago
- Founder: Slovene American Football Association
- First season: 2009–10
- Country: Slovenia
- Most recent champion: Domžale Tigers (2019)
- Most titles: Ljubljana Silverhawks (6 titles)

The Slovenian Football League (Slovene: Državno prvenstvo v ameriškem nogometu) was an American football competition in Slovenia, founded in 2009 by the Slovene American Football Association. Each season culminated with the Slovenian Bowl, the national bowl game of Slovenia.

== League history ==
=== 2009–10: The Initiation ===
The Slovenian national league was founded on 9 October 2009 by the Slovene American Football Association. The first league game in Slovenia was played in the said year and four teams competed that year. Those teams were the Ljubljana Silverhawks, Maribor Generals, Alp Devils, and Gold Diggers.

The final game of the season, the inaugural Slovenian Bowl was played on 26 June 2010, where the Ljubljana Silverhawks defeated Alp Devils 41–0.

=== 2011–2012: The Growth ===
In the following season, the league added teams from the Croatian Federation of American Football. Those teams were the Zagreb Raiders and Zagreb Thunder.

The next Slovenian Bowl games were played in 2011, 2012 and 2013, where the Ljubljana Silverhawks won the title three times in a row.

== Seasons ==
=== 2009–10 ===
Pos.	Team	P	W	L	Points For	Points Difference	Winning Percentage
1.	Ljubljana Silverhawks	6	6	0	358	338	1.000
2.	Alp Devils	6	3	3	110	–57	0.500
3.	Maribor Generals	6	3	3	143	–59	0.500
4.	Gold Diggers	6	0	6	46	–222	0.000

=== 2011 ===
Pos.	Team	P	W	L	Points For	Points Difference	Winning Percentage
1.	Ljubljana Silverhawks	6	6	0	277	185	1.000
2.	Zagreb Thunder	6	4	2	146	4	0.667
3.	Maribor Generals	6	2	4	200	14	0.333
4.	Alp Devils	6	0	6	25	–203	0.000

=== 2012 ===
Pos.	Team	P	W	L	Points For	Points Difference	Winning Percentage
1.	Ljubljana Silverhawks	5	5	0	155	141	1.000
2.	Maribor Generals	6	4	2	143	20	0.667
3.	Alp Devils	6	2	4	123	–2	0.333
4.	Zagreb Raiders	2	0	2	42	–48	0.000
5.	Zagreb Thunder	3	0	3	18	–111	0.000

== Slovenian Bowl champions ==
Year	Champions	Opponents	Result
2009–10	Ljubljana Silverhawks	Alp Devils	41–0
2011	Ljubljana Silverhawks	Zagreb Thunder	29–19
2012	Ljubljana Silverhawks	Maribor Generals	23–10
2013	Ljubljana Silverhawks	Maribor Generals	45–0
2016	Ljubljana Silverhawks	Alp Devils	55–6
2017	Ljubljana Silverhawks	Alp Devils	47–0
2019	Domžale Tigers	Maribor Generals	30–7
