= Hungarian American Football League =

American football competition in Hungary

Hungarian Football League
- Formerly: Hungarian American Football League (MAFL)
- Sport: American football
- Founded: 2005
- Founder: Hungarian Federation of American Football (MAFSZ)
- First season: 2005
- No. of teams: 6 (HFL); 7 (Division I); 4 (Division II)
- Country: Hungary
- Most recent champion: Budapest Cowbells (3rd title)
- Most titles: Budapest Wolves (8 titles)
- Broadcaster: Digi Sport
- Website: MAFSZ Online

The Hungarian Football League (HFL) is the top tier national American football competition in Hungary, organized by the Hungarian Federation of American Football (MAFSZ). The competition was formerly called Hungarian American Football League (MAFL) (Hungarian: Magyarországi Amerikai Futballcsapatok Ligája), the top tier as MAFL Division I and the second tier as MAFL Division II; since 2012 the top tier is HFL, the 2nd tier is MAFSZ Division I and the 3rd tier is MAFSZ Division II.

== History ==
Hungarian teams formed and began playing in the 1990's when the Budapest Cowboys and Budapest Lions played in lower level division leagues outside of Hungary. The Hungarian American Football League (MAFL) began in 2005 under the guidance of the Hungarian Federation of American Football (MAFSZ) with 4 teams (Budapest Wolves, Győr Sharks, Debrecen Gladiators, Nagykanizsa Demos. The game rules are the standard gridiron football (NCAA) rules. The first winner of the first Hungarian Bowl was the Wolves.

In the next 2 years, the Wolves participated only in the Austrian Football League 3rd tier. These 2 years the HFL was won by the Sharks. In 2006, eight teams participated. In 2007, the championship had been split into two divisions (6 teams at Division I and 9 at Division II).

In 2008, the Wolves returned, and they won 3 more championships undefeated. In 2009, 26 teams participated so Division III had been introduced (this year 5, 12, and 9 teams have been played in the three tiers). In 2010, they returned into the 2 tier format.

In 2011, MAFSZ restructured the championship format with the introduction of Hungarian Football League (HFL), which was intended to be an international competition with the top 4 Hungarian teams and 4 from abroad. Division I and Division II became the 2nd and 3rd tier competitions, which were played in the spring season. The HFL was scheduled as a fall season but only 3 teams were willing to participate, so in 2011, the Hungarian Bowl was canceled.

In 2012, the HFL finally started, and this year the Budapest Wolves suffered their first-ever defeat against a Hungarian team (against Budapest Hurricanes), but in the final, the Wolves defeated the Hurricanes. However, in 2013, the Hurricanes, in 2014 the Újbuda Rebels, and in 2015 the Bratislava Monarchs defeated the Wolves in the Hungarian Bowl. The 2015 season was the only one when a foreign team participated, and with the Monarchs' win, the official Hungarian champion was the HFL runners-up Wolves.

In 2016, the Miskolc Steelers became the first non-capital city team in HFL history to participate in the finals, and they won the trophy as well, becoming the 6th team to win HFL in the 6 years' HFL history. In 2017, the Cowbells won the trophy, being technically the 7th team to win the HFL, but as they are the successor of Újbuda Rebels, they are the first team to win 2 HFL trophies.

== Hungarian American Football League system ==
Season	HFL	Division I	Division II	Division III	Cup
2005		I. Hungarian Bowl			
2006		II. Hungarian Bowl			I. Blue Bowl
2007		III. Hungarian Bowl	I. Pannon Bowl		
2008		IV. Hungarian Bowl	II. Pannon Bowl		
2009		V. Hungarian Bowl	III. Pannon Bowl	I. Duna Bowl	
2010		VI. Hungarian Bowl	IV. Pannon Bowl		
2011	(Fall Bowl)	V. Pannon Bowl	II. Duna Bowl		
2012	VII. Hungarian Bowl	VI. Pannon Bowl	III. Duna Bowl		II. Blue Bowl
2013	VIII. Hungarian Bowl	VII. Pannon Bowl	IV. Duna Bowl		
2014	IX. Hungarian Bowl	VIII. Pannon Bowl	V. Duna Bowl		
2015	X. Hungarian Bowl	IX. Pannon Bowl	VI. Duna Bowl		
2016	XI. Hungarian Bowl	X. Pannon Bowl	VII. Duna Bowl		
2017	XII. Hungarian Bowl	XI. Pannon Bowl	VIII. Duna Bowl		
2018	XIII. Hungarian Bowl	XII. Pannon Bowl	IX. Duna Bowl		
2019	XIV. Hungarian Bowl	XIII. Pannon Bowl	X. Duna Bowl		
2020		XIV. Pannon Bowl	XI. Duna Bowl		
2021	XV. Hungarian Bowl	XV. Pannon Bowl	XII. Duna Bowl		
2022	XVI. VEOLIA Hungarian Bowl	XVI. Pannon Bowl	XIII. Duna Bowl		
2023	XVII. VEOLIA Hungarian Bowl	XVII. Pannon Bowl			
2024	XVIII. VEOLIA Hungarian Bowl	XVIII. Pannon Bowl	XIV. Duna Bowl		
2025	XIX. VEOLIA Hungarian Bowl	XIX. Pannon Bowl	XV. Duna Bowl		
2026	XX. VEOLIA Hungarian Bowl	XX. Pannon Bowl	XVI. Duna Bowl		

== Champions ==
Season	Division I	Division II	Division III
2005	ARD7 Budapest Wolves	—	—
2006	Győr Sharks	—	—
2007	Győr Sharks	Budapest Cowboys	—
2008	Budapest Wolves	Nyíregyháza Tigers	—
2009	Budapest Wolves	Dunaújváros Gorillaz	Újbuda Rebels
2010	Budapest Wolves	Miskolc Steelers	—
Season	HFL	Division I	Division II
2011	—	Nyíregyháza Tigers	Budapest Hurricanes
2012	Budapest Wolves	Dunaújváros Gorillaz	Budapest Cowboys
2013	Budapest Hurricanes	Budapest Cowboys	Újpest Bulldogs
2014	Újbuda Rebels	Újpest Bulldogs	Miskolc Renegades
2015	Bratislava Monarchs	Eger Heroes	Gladiators
2016	Miskolc Steelers	Dunaújváros Gorillaz	Budapest Eagles
2017	Budapest Cowbells	Fehérvár Enthroners	Nyíregyháza Tigers
2018	Budapest Wolves	Szombathely Crushers	Eger Heroes
2019	Fehérvár Enthroners	Szombathely Crushers	Miskolc Renegades
2020	—	Győr Sharks	VSD Rangers
2021	Budapest Wolves	Miskolc AFT	Budapest Wolves II
2022	Fehérvár Enthroners	Budapest Titans	Újpest Bulldogs
2023	Budapest Wolves	Dabas Sparks	—
2024	Budapest Titans	Hódkertész Guardians	DEAC Gladiators
2025	Diósd Saints	Tatabánya Mustangs	Budapest Cowbells 2
2026	Budapest Cowbells	Hódkertész Guardians	Dabas Sparks

== Championship games ==
=== Hungarian Bowl ===
The Hungarian Bowl is the Championship Game of the Hungarian American Football League. Between 2005 and 2010 it was the final of the MAFL Division I. In 2011, the new top-tier championship HFL was postponed, no Hungarian Bowl took place, and the Fall Bowl was an unofficial championship. Since 2012, the Hungarian Bowl has been the final of the Hungarian Football League.

==== Hungarian Bowl results ====
No.	Season	Winner	Opponent	Score
I	2005, MAFL	ARD7 Budapest Wolves	Debrecen Gladiators	46–0
II	2006, MAFL	Győr Sharks	Debrecen Gladiators	7–6
III	2007, MAFL Div I	Győr Sharks	Debrecen Gladiators	42–12
IV	2008, MAFL Div I	Budapest Wolves	Budapest Cowboys	20–14
V	2009, MAFL Div I	Budapest Wolves	Győr Sharks	16–12
VI	2010, MAFL Div I	Budapest Wolves	Nyíregyháza Tigers	58–0
Fall Bowl	2011	Budapest Wolves	Nyíregyháza Tigers	28–0
VII	2012, HFL	Budapest Wolves	Budapest Hurricanes	65–21
VIII	2013, HFL	Budapest Hurricanes	Docler Wolves	28–24
IX	2014, HFL	Újbuda Rebels	Docler Wolves	19–9
X	2015, HFL	Bratislava Monarchs (Slovakia)	Budapest Wolves	55–34
XI	2016, HFL	Miskolc Steelers	Budapest Cowbells	19–16
XII	2017, HFL	Budapest Cowbells	Miskolc Steelers	14–10
XIII	2018, HFL	Budapest Wolves	Miskolc Steelers	34–30
XIV	2019, HFL	Fehérvár Enthroners	Kiev Capitals (Ukraine)	14-12
XV	2021, HFL	Budapest Wolves	Fehérvár Enthroners	18–7
XVI	2022, HFL	Fehérvár Enthroners	Budapest Wolves	31–24
XVII	2023, HFL	Budapest Wolves	Újpest Bulldogs	49–28
XVIII	2024, HFL	Budapest Titans	Budapest Cowbells	51–29
XIX	2025, HFL	Diósd Saints	Újpest Bulldogs	56–21
XX	2026, HFL	Budapest Cowbells	Győr Sharks	21–14

==== Hungarian Bowl statistics ====
Position	Team	Champions	Runners-up
1.	Budapest Wolves	8 (2005, 2008, 2009, 2010, 2012, 2018, 2021, 2023)	4 (2013, 2014, 2015, 2022)
2.	Budapest Cowbells	3 (2014, 2017, 2026)	3 (2008, 2016, 2024)
3.	Győr Sharks	2 (2006, 2007)	2 (2009, 2026)
4.	Fehérvár Enthroners	2 (2019, 2022)	1 (2021)
5.	Miskolc Steelers	1 (2016)	2 (2017, 2018)
6.	Budapest Hurricanes	1 (2013)	1 (2012)
7.	Bratislava Monarchs (Slovakia)	1 (2015)	
7.	Budapest Titans	1 (2024)	
7.	Diósd Saints	1 (2025)	
10.	Debrecen Gladiators		3 (2005, 2006, 2007)
11.	Újpest Bulldogs		2 (2023,2025)
12.	Nyíregyháza Tigers		1 (2010)
12.	Kiev Capitals (Ukraine)		1 (2019)

=== Pannon Bowl ===
The Pannon Bowl is the MAFSZ's second-tier championship game that was first played in 2007.

==== Pannon Bowl results ====
No.	Season	Winner	Opponent	Score
I.	2007, Division II	Budapest Cowboys	North Pest Vipers	45–0
II.	2008, Division II	Nyíregyháza Tigers	Zala Predators	36–20
III.	2009, Division II	Dunaújváros Gorillaz	Zala Predators	10–0
IV.	2010, Division II	Miskolc Steelers		no playoffs
V.	2011, Division II	Nyíregyháza Tigers	Békéscsaba Raptors	42–7
VI.	2012, Division I	Dunaújváros Gorillaz	Békéscsaba Raptors	34–3
VII.	2013, Division I	Budapest Cowboys	Dunaújváros Gorillaz	12–6
VIII.	2014, Division I	Újpest Bulldogs	Miskolc Steelers	43–36
IX.	2015, Division I	Eger Heroes	Dunaújváros Gorillaz	19–16
X.	2016, Division I	Dunaújváros Gorillaz	Gladiators AFC	28–8
XI.	2017, Division I	Fehérvár Enthroners	Budapest Eagles	28–7
XII.	2018, Division I	Szombathely Crushers	Szekszárd Bad Bones	17–7
XIII.	2019, Division I	Szombathely Crushers	Eger Heroes	32–0
XIV.	2020, Division I	Győr Sharks	NBA Crushers	32–13
XV.	2021, Division I	Miskolc AFT	Budapest Cowbells II	43–22
XVI.	2022, Division I	Budapest Titans	Crushers	18–13
XVII.	2023, Division I	Dabas Sparks	Budapest Wolves II	17–14
XVIII.	2024, Division I	Hódkertész Guardians	Diósd Saints	34–33
XIX.	2025, Division I	Tatabánya Mustangs	Szombathely Crushers	36–31
XX.	2026, Division I	Szombathely Crushers	Hódkertész Guardians	22–7

=== Duna Bowl ===
The Duna Bowl is the third-tier championship game of the MAFSZ.

==== Duna Bowl results ====
No.	Season	Winner	Opponent	Score
I.	2009, Division III	Újbuda Rebels	Jászberény Wolverines	33–0
II.	2011, Division II	Budapest Hurricanes	Újpest Bulldogs	56–14
III.	2012, Division II	Budapest Cowboys	Újbuda Rebels II	33–7
IV.	2013, Division II	Újpest Bulldogs	Újbuda Rebels II	41–6
V.	2014, Division II	Miskolc Renegades	Budapest Hurricanes II	38–21
VI.	2015, Division II	Debrecen Gladiators	Szekszárd Bad Bones	21–14
VII.	2016, Division II	Budapest Eagles	Fehérvár Enthroners	35–13
VIII.	2017, Division II	Nyíregyháza Tigers	Szombathely Crushers	17–7
IX.	2018, Division II	Eger Heroes	Dabas Sparks	42-20
X.	2019, Division II	Miskolc Renegades	Tatabánya Mustangs	40-38
XII.	2021, Division II	Budapest Wolves II	Tatabánya Mustangs	34–14
XIII.	2022, Division II	Újpest Bulldogs	Budapest Wolves II	10–6
XIV.	2024, Division II	DEAC Gladiators	Eger Heroes	38–7
XV.	2025, Division II	Budapest Cowbells 2	Pécs Legioners	27–14
XVI.	2026, Division II	Dabas Sparks	Pécs Legioners	18–0

=== Blue Bowls ===
In 2006, the MAFSZ created the Blue Bowl, the national cup game.

==== Blue Bowl results ====
Table of Results
Season	Winner	Loser	Score
2006	ARD7 Budapest Wolves	Debrecen Gladiators	63–20
2012	Budapest Cowboys	Újpest Bulldogs	13–6

== Teams ==
Location of the teams

HFL teams

- Budapest Cowbells (2012–present)
- Budapest Titans (2023–present)
- Budapest Wolves (2012–present)
- Diósd Saints (2025–present)
- Győr Sharks (2012–present)
- Újpest Bulldogs (2023–present)
- VSD Rangers (2023–present)

Division I teams

- Dabas Sparks
- Diósd Saints II
- DEAC Gladiators
- Guardians
- Szombathely Crushers
- Tatabánya Mustangs

Division II teams

- Budapest Cowbells 2
- Cassovia Steelers (HFL: 2015–2022)
- Eger Heroes (HFL: 2016–2017)
- Pécs Legioners
- Sentinels
