= Ostrava Steelers =

- Founded: 1994; 32 years ago
- League: Česká Liga Amerického Fotbalu
- Based in: Ostrava-Poruba, Czech Republic
- Stadium: SAP Ostrava
- President: Jiří Dluhoš
- Head coach: Mark Priegnitz
- Manager: Michal Trajkov
- Championships: 1997
- Website: www.ostravasteelers.cz

Ostrava Steelers are an American football team based in Ostrava, Czech Republic. The Steelers play in the Czech League of American Football. The team formed in 1994. The team won the Czech Bowl in 1997, and were losing finalists in 2017, 2018, and 2019.
