= Maribor Generals =

- Founded: 21 May 2008; 18 years ago
- Folded: 2024; 2 years ago
- Based in: Maribor, Slovenia
- Stadium: Tabor Sports Park
- Colors: Green, gold, black
- Championships: AFL (Division 2): 2017; AAFL: 2013, 2014, 2015

The Maribor Generals were an American football team from Maribor, Slovenia.

== History ==
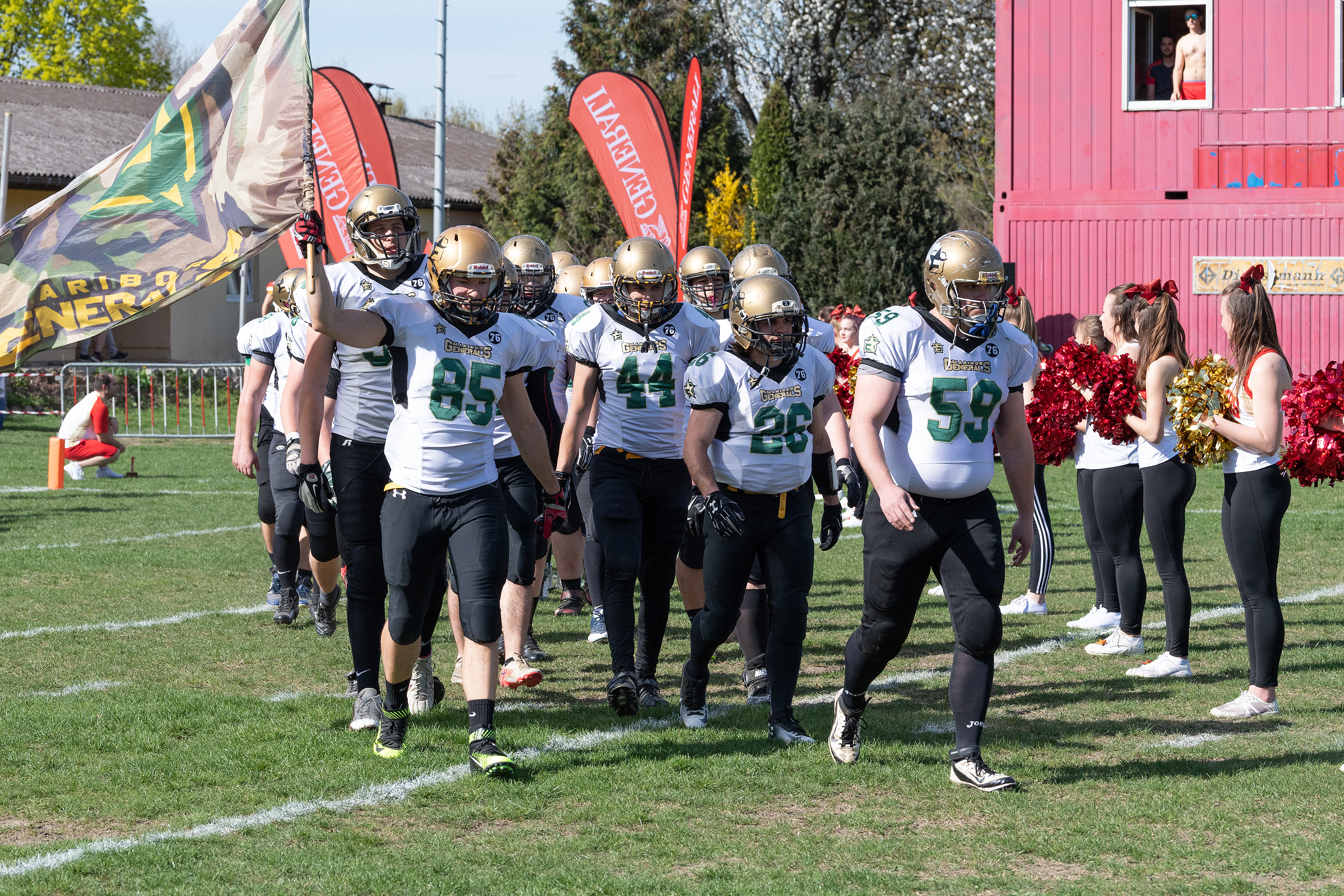
Maribor Generals in 2018

The Maribor Generals were founded on 21 May 2008.

In October 2009, the Generals, along with the Ljubljana Silverhawks, Alp Devils and Gold Diggers, organized the first Slovenian Football League. The Generals played their first official match of the Slovenian Championship against the Alp Devils, defeating them 25–13 and scoring the first touchdown of the championship with a kickoff return.

In 2012, the Generals reached the Slovenian Bowl II, where they were defeated by the Sliverhawks, 23–10. In the 2013 season, the difference in points made the Generals reached the Slovenian Bowl once again, but the Silverhawks defeated them again.

In 2016, the Generals played in the Division 2 of the Austrian Football League, where the team finished in first place without a single defeat after the regular part of the season, but were defeated by the Styrian Bears in the IX Iron Bowl, held in Graz. The next season, the Generals once again reached the finals of the Division 2. This time they defeated the Telfs Patriots to win the X Iron Bowl, securing promotion to the Austrian Division 1 (second tier).

== Honours ==
- Slovenian Football League

Runners-up: 2012, 2013, 2019
Third place: 2009–10, 2011, 2016

- Austrian Football League (Division 2)

Champions: 2017
Runners-up: 2016

- Alpe Adria Football League

Champions: 2013, 2014, 2015
