= Alp Devils =

American football team based in Slovenia

- Founded: 2008; 18 years ago
- Based in: Visoko, Šenčur, Slovenia
- Stadium: Stadion Oval
- Colors: Red, black

The Alp Devils were an American football team based in Visoko, Šenčur, Slovenia. They reached the inaugural Slovenian Bowl in 2010, where they lost to the Ljubljana Silverhawks.

== History ==
The Alp Devils were founded in 2008, together with the Maribor Generals and Gold Diggers. The Devils reached the inaugural Slovenian Bowl in 2010, where they lost 41–0 to the Ljubljana Silverhawks.

== Honours ==
- Slovenian Football League
  - Runners-up: 2009–10, 2016, 2017
- Alpe Adria Football League
  - Runners-up: 2014
  - Third place: 2013
- CEFL Cup
  - Runners-up: 2017
