= Domžale Tigers =

Slovenian American football team

- Founded: 2013; 13 years ago
- Based in: Domžale, Slovenia
- Stadium: Domžale Sports Park
- Colors: Orange, black, white
- President: Peter Kovač
- Championships: SFL: 2019
- Website: www.domzalskitigri.si

The Domžale Tigers are an American football team from Domžale, Slovenia. Their home games are played at the Domžale Sports Park.

== Honours ==
- Slovenian Football League

Champions: 2019
Third place: 2017
