= Bratislava Monarchs =

American football team in Slovakia

- Founded: April 1, 1995; 31 years ago
- League: Czech League of American Football
- Based in: Bratislava, Slovakia
- Stadium: Mladá Garda Stadium
- Colors: Cobalt Blue, New Century Gold, and White
- President: Peter Kočí
- Head coach: vacant
- Championships: Slovak Football League: 2011, 2012, 2015, 2017, 2019 Hungarian Football League: 2015 Austrian Football League Div. I: 2017
- Cheerleaders: M&M Cheerleaders
- Mascot: Maurice The Monarch
- Website: www.monarchs.sk

The Bratislava Monarchs are an American football team in Bratislava, Slovakia, established in 1996. The Monarchs compete in the Czech League of American Football.

== History ==
=== Establishment ===
The interest in American football in Slovakia grew rapidly after the first television broadcasts of the National Football League season in 1993. The first meetings for the team began in the summer of 1994 in Bratislava. The number of new players each week increased, and at the end of the year there were over 30 people. The club was officially founded on April 1, 1996, and was the first American football club in Slovakia.

The first game for the Monarchs was played in the spring of 2004 with helmets and shoulder pads, against the Kragujevac Wild Boars, which they won. During 2008, the Monarchs played in the Central European Football League, where they competed against the CNC Gladiators from Austria, Budapest Wolves and Budapest Cowboys from Hungary, Ljubljana Silverhawks from Slovenia, Belgrade Vukovi and Novi Sad Dukes from Serbia, and Zagreb Thunder from Croatia.

=== 2011: Bratislava's first major title ===
The first league game in Slovakia was played in 2011 with 5 teams competing. The final game of the Slovak Football League was played on August 6, 2011, at the ŠKP Štadión, where the Monarchs defeated the Nitra Knights, 21–6.

=== 2012: Bratislava's second major title ===
The 2012 season as they defeated the Trnava Bulldogs in the Slovak Football League finals, 38–31.

=== 2013–2014: Bratislava's Bronze Medal and Fourth Place Finish ===
The Monarchs started the season with a preseason game against Danube Dragons, and lost 30–27. In the Slovak Football League, they finished 3rd.

Despite a successful start to the 2014 Slovak Football League season, the Monarchs failed to make to the Slovak Football League finals, where the Smolenice Eagles beat the Žilina Warriors.

=== 2015: Bratislava's third major title ===
The Monarchs entered the 2015 Slovak Football League season with their new head coach, Christoph Dreyer. The Monarchs won their third Slovak Football League title after defeating the Trnava Bulldogs, 48–26. The Monarchs also became the first team outside Hungary to win the Hungarian American Football League by beating the Budapest Wolves.

== Season Stats ==
=== Slovak Bowl Results ===
Slovak Football League	Champion	Opponent	Result
2011 - Slovak Bowl I	Bratislava Monarchs	Nitra Knights	21-6
2012 - Slovak Bowl II	Bratislava Monarchs	Trnava Bulldogs	38-31
2015 - Slovak Bowl V	Bratislava Monarchs	Trnava Bulldogs	48-26

=== Hungarian Bowl Results ===
Hungarian Bowl	Champion	Opponent	Result
2015 - Hungarian Bowl IX	Bratislava Monarchs	Budapest Wolves	55–34

== Honours ==
- Slovak Bowl
  - Champions: (3) 2015, 2017, 2019
- Hungarian Bowl (Hungary)
  - Champions: (1) 2015
- Silver Bowl (2nd tier level) (Austria)
  - Champions: (1) 2017
