= Budapest Cowbells =

American football team from Budapest, Hungary

- Established: December 2013; 11 years ago
- Based in: Budapest, Hungary
- Home stadium: Tichy Lajos Sportcentrum (Budapest)
- Head coach: (Belgium) Karim Trabelsi
- League: HFL
- Colors: Dark blue, neon green and white
- League titles: 2 (2014, 2017)
- Website: www.cowbells.hu

Current uniform
Home

Away

The Budapest Cowbells are an American football team from Budapest, Hungary. The team was founded in December 2013 by merger of Budapest Cowboys and Újbuda Rebels. The Cowbells are two-time champions of Hungarian Football League.

== Brief history ==
=== Budapest Cowboys ===
The Cowboys were the first Hungarian American football team. American businessman Tom Kelly established it in 1991 as Budapest Starforce and they played the first American football match in Hungary against Munich Nightmare. In 1993, under new head coach Jeff Egan, they merged with the other Hungarian club Budapest Lions. That year they went undefeated in the Austrian Football League Third Division, losing only to the Vienna Vikings II (second team) from the second division (third tier) in the League Championship. In 1994 they changed their name into Budapest Cowboys. Due to their routing of third division teams the year prior they were moved up to the second division (third tier) where they again went undefeated during the regular season. They won most games by a wide margin, but lost in the League Championship game again to the second team of the Vikings; this time only by a point. The coaches rotated again before the 1995 season and played in the third tier level in Austria finishing with a losing season. As there were no other Hungarian teams they participated the Czech and lower Austrian leagues until 2000 when the club stopped working.

In 2004 with the establishment of the Budapest Wolves Hungarian American football went alive. Some old Cowboys joined the new team, some started to train again, and in 2006 the Budapest Cowboys have been re-established. In 2007, they won the 2nd Division, and in 2008 they finished as runners-up in the Hungarian Bowl. In 2008 and 2009 they participated in the Central European Football League.

The Cowboys participated in the IFAF CEI Interleague in 2011 and 2012.

=== Újbuda Rebels ===
In 2004 North Pest Vipers have been established. In 2006 some of the Vipers joined the Cowboys, and in 2008 the management decided to join the Budapest Titans. Most of the players decided not to join the Titans but to continue alone, so they founded a new team under the name Újbuda Rebels. As they were technically a new team, they had to start in the 3rd Division in 2009, and they won it without losing a single game. In 2010, they joined the 1st Division and in 2012 the Hungarian Football League.

The Rebels participated in the IFAF CEI Interleague in 2013.

=== Budapest Cowbells ===
In December 2013 the two clubs joined. In 2014 in the HFL they participated as Rebels, in the IFAF CEI Interleague they participated as Cowboys. In this year they won the Hungarian Football League and finished runners-up in the Interleague. In December they merged the names of the teams.

In 2016, they finished as runners-up in the HFL losing against Miskolc Steelers, and they re-joined to the CEFL. In 2017 they won the HFL by defeating the Steelers.

== See also ==
- Hungarian American Football League
- Central European Football League
