= Saaf (surname) =

Saaf is a surname, and people with the surname include:

- Abdallah Saaf (born 1949), Moroccan academic and politician
- Art Saaf (1921–2007), American comics artist
- Per-Anders Sääf (born 1965), Swedish volleyball player
- Randy Saaf, American businessman and activist
