= Budapest Hurricanes =

- Full name: Budapest Hurricanes
- Nicknames: 'Canes
- Founded: 2009
- Dissolved: 2014
- League: HFL (2012–2013); CEI (2013–2013); ADIV2 (2011–2012); HDIV2 (2011)
- Based in: Budapest, Hungary
- Stadium: Építok stadion
- Colors: Orange, White, Dark Green
- Owner: Péter Hajós, György Hajós
- President: Zsóka Hajós
- Head coach: Zsolt Kovács
- Championships: MAFSZ HFL (2013); MAFSZ DIV2 (2011); AFBÖ DIV2 (2011)
- Website: hurricanes.hu

The Budapest Hurricanes were an American football team based in Budapest, Hungary. The team competed in the Hungarian Football League and the IFAF CEI Cup. The Hurricanes were founded in 2009 and have become a dominant team of Hungary since. Although the team played only three friendly games in 2010, since 2011 they were a full member of the domestic American football competitions. After the Hurricanes were the champions of the HFL and the youth cup as well in 2013, the team had been dissolved in 2014.

== Seasons ==
=== 2010 ===
Based on the decision of the Hungarian American Football Federation (MAFSZ) the team could not take part in any competition. Consequently, the Hurricanes played three friendly games with foreign teams.

Date	Opponent	Score	Venue	Stats
2 October 2010	Team Slovenia	L 19–26	Építõk Sporthostel, Budapest, Hungary	
17 October 2010	@ Vienna Knights	L 30–14	Freizetpark Schmelz, Wien, Austria	
6 November 2010	@ Zagreb Patriots	W 11–21	Zagreb, Croatia	

=== 2011 ===
As a newcomer, the Hurricanes had to compete in the lowest division (Division II) of the Hungarian championships. The team won the Division II undefeated and beat the Újpest Bulldogs 56–14 in the finale. The team simultaneously competed in the Austrian league as well, where they finished the regular season with a 3–1 record. Excluding youth competitions, the Hurricanes became the first Hungarian American football team to win an international championship by defeating the Alpine Hammers 31–13 in the finale.

Competition	Date	Opponent	Score	Venue	Stats
MAFL DIV II.	12 March 2011	@ Fehérvár Enthroners	W 0–43	Fehérvár, Hungary	
MAFL DIV II.	26 March 2011	@ Debrecen Gladiators	W 6–49	Debrecen, Hungary	
MAFL DIV II.	9 April 2011	Újpest Bulldogs	W 61–0	Építõk Sporthostel, Budapest, Hungary	
AFBÖ DIV II.	16 April 2011	Zagreb Patriots	W 42–21	Építõk Sporthostel, Budapest, Hungary	
AFBÖ DIV II.	30 April 2011	@ Danube Dragons 2	W 7–37	Rattenfängerstadion, Wien, Austria	
MAFL DIV II.	7 May 2011	@ Budapest Eagles	W 7–42	Építõk Sporthostel, Budapest, Hungary	
MAFL DIV II.	22 May 2011	Tata Mustangs	W 57–12	Építõk Sporthostel, Budapest, Hungary	
AFBÖ DIV II.	28 May 2011	Danube Dragons 2	W 55–19	Építõk Sporthostel, Budapest, Hungary	
AFBÖ DIV II.	4 June 2011	@ Zagreb Patriots	L 26–20	Zagreb, Croatia	
AFBÖ DIV II.	18 June 2011	@ Carinthian Black Lions 2	W 34–36	Stadion Villach Lind, Villach, Austria	
AFBÖ DIV II.	3 July 2011	@ Alpin Hammers	W 13–31	Regionales Sportzenrum, Schwaz, Austria	
MAFL DIV II.	10 July 2011	Budapest Cowboys 2	W 40–0	Építõk Sporthostel, Budapest, Hungary	
MAFL DIV II.	17 July 2011	Újpest Bulldogs	W 56–14	Dunaújváros, Hungary	

=== 2012 ===
As the team was invited to the first season of the Hungarian Football League, it did not participate in the Division I championship. The Hurricanes achieved another historic feature in the regular season by defeating the Budapest Wolves who conceded their first defeat against a Hungarian team since being founded nearly ten years earlier. The Hurricanes, led by head coach Zsolt Kovács, won the regular season encounter 33–27. The team finished the regular season undefeated; however, lost 65–21 in a lopsided game against the Budapest Wolves, who, as a result, won the championship. The Hurricanes could not defend their title in Austria as they lost to the Cineplexx Blue Devils in the regular season and in the finale as well. Both games were decided by less than 9 points. Consequently, the team finished as the runners-up in both competitions in 2012.

Competition	Date	Opponent	Score	Venue	Stats
AFBÖ DIV II.	1 April 2012	@ Cineplexx Blue Devils	L 12–7	Herrenriedstadion, Hohenems, Austria	
AFBÖ DIV II.	8 April 2012	Styrian Bears	W 62–0	Építõk Sporthostel, Budapest, Hungary	
AFBÖ DIV II.	21 April 2012	Red Lions Hall	W 42–0	Építõk Sporthostel, Budapest, Hungary	
AFBÖ DIV II.	12 May 2012	@ Generali Invaders	W 6–23	Sankt Pölten, Austria	
AFBÖ DIV II.	20 May 2012	Amstetten Thunder	W 79–30	Építõk Sporthostel, Budapest, Hungary	
AFBÖ DIV II.	27 May 2012	@ Alpin Hammers	W 6–28	Regionales Sportzenrum, Schwaz, Austria	
AFBÖ DIV II.	17 June 2012	@ Amstetten Thunder	W 38–73	Umdasch Stadion, Amstetten, Austria	
AFBÖ DIV II.	24 July 2012	@ Cineplexx Blue Devils	L 14–6	Herrenriedstadion, Hohenems, Austria	
MAFL HFL	8 September 2012	@ Gyõr Sharks	W 41–7	Elektromos Sporttelep, Gyõr, Hungary	
MAFL HFL	29 September 2012	Budapest Wolves	W 33–27	Építõk Sporthostel, Budapest, Hungary	
MAFL HFL	6 October 2012	@ Újbuda Rebels	W 14–30	Építõk Sporthostel, Budapest, Hungary	
MAFL HFL	20 October 2012	Budapest Wolves	L 21–65	Sport utcai Stadion, Budapest, Hungary	

=== 2013 ===
In spring the team competed in the first IFAF CEI Cup. The team did not reach the finale of the competition as they finished with a 2–3 record, which earned them the third place among the four teams. The Hurricanes lost the three games with a combined margin of 10 points. Similarly to 2012, the Hurricanes finished the regular season of the HFL undefeated, which earned them a berth in the 2013 HFL finale. They played in the finale against the Budapest Wolves again. The team rallied and overcame a 10-point difference to win 28–24 and become Hungarian champions.

Competition	Date	Opponent	Score	Venue	Stats
IFAF CEI	20 April 2013	@ Bratislava Monarchs	L 35–33	Istrochem Stadium, Bratislava, Slovakia	
IFAF CEI	11 May 2013	Topolcany Kings	L 13–20	Építõk Sporthostel, Budapest, Hungary	
IFAF CEI	26 May 2013	@ Topolcany Kings	W 31–41	Mestsky Stadium, Topolcany, Slovakia	
IFAF CEI	8 June 2013	Bratislava Monarchs	L 13–14	Építõk Sporthostel, Budapest, Hungary	
IFAF CEI	22 June 2013	Újbuda Rebels	W 56–36	Építõk Sporthostel, Budapest, Hungary	
MAFL HFL	7 September 2013	@ Újbuda Rebels	W 27–35	Tungsram-pálya, Budapest, Hungary	
MAFL HFL	14 September 2013	@ Nyíregyháza Tigers	W 7–56	Nyíregyházi Városi Stadion, Nyíregyháza, Hungary	
MAFL HFL	28 September 2013	Gyõr Sharks	W 58–14	Építõk Sporthostel, Budapest, Hungary	
MAFL HFL	6 October 2013	Budapest Wolves	W 46–37	Építõk Sporthostel, Budapest, Hungary	
MAFL HFL	26 October 2013	Budapest Wolves	W 28–24	Szõnyi úti Stadion, Budapest, Hungary	

=== 2014 ===
Competition	Date	Opponent	Score	Venue	Stats
CEI	29 March 1014	@ Beograd Blue Dragons	L 7–17	Belgrade, Serbia	
CEI	12 April 2014	vs Bratislava Monarchs	L 28–35	Építõk Sporthostel, Budapest	
CEI	26 April 2014	vs Budapest Cowboys	L 0–20*	Építõk Sporthostel, Budapest	
CEI	18 May 2014	@ Budapest Cowboys	L 13–12	Budapest	
CEI	31 May 2014	vs Pančevo Panthers	W 55–28	Építõk Sporthostel, Budapest	
CEI	8 June 2014	@ Bratislava Monarchs	L 36–32	Bratislava, Slovakia	
HFL	7 September 2014	vs Docler Wolves	W 55–42	Budapest, Építõk Sporthostel	
HFL	14 September 2014	@ Győr Sharks		Győr	
HFL	27 September 2014	@ Újbuda Rebels		Budapest	
HFL	4 October 2014	vs Újbuda Rebels		Budapest, Építõk Sporthostel	
HFL	19 October 2014	vs Győr Sharks		Budapest, Építõk Sporthostel	
HFL	25 October 2014	@ Docler Wolves		Budapest	

- *The game was canceled due to weather conditions.

== Players ==
=== Current roster ===
Budapest Hurricanes Current Roster
Quarterbacks: 5 Márk Bencsics; 13 Márton Czirók; Running backs: 32 Dávid Danku; 37 Szabolcs Bóbis; 42 Ádám Szekeres; Wide receivers: 11 Bence Balog KR; 19 Péter Tokaji; 81 Béla Rinyu; 83 György Varga; 86 Kristóf Madarassy K; 87 Dávid Király; 89 Ádám Elek KR/PR	Offensive line: 50 Roland Fazekas; 60 Norbert Bakonyi; 64 Gábor Hartai; 65 Gábor Kovács; 66 Gergely Novák; 69 Ferenc Lipták; 76 Márton Hadzsi; Defensive line: 52 Szabolcs Bíró; 77 Ádám Németh; 92 Tamás Ambrus; 93 Álmos Illés; 96 Dr. Ferenc Borhegyi	Linebackers: 20 Ádám Hatlaczki; 22 Bence Szobonya; 54 Gyula Csehi; 54 Máté Szűcs; 56 Bertalan Nagy; 56 Csaba Kordován; 59 László Kapás; 80 Gábor Szűcs; 90 Ádám Sipiczki; Secondary: 9 Tibor Popovics; 14 Ádám Stefanidesz; 18 Gábor Puha; 21 András Sápi; 23 Bálint Slézia; 24 Richárd Madarassy; 26 Kristóf Szakács K/P; 39 Márk Mezei; 99 Roland Kovács

- Hurricanes Roster at hurricanes.hu

== Staff / Coaches ==
=== Current Staff / Coaches ===
Budapest Hurricanes Staff and Coaches
Staff: Owner – Péter Hajós; Owner – Görgy Hajós; President – Zsóka Hajós; International affair – Bea Letenyei	Offensive coaches: Head coach, offensive coordinator – Zsolt Kovács; Offensive line coach- Balázs Zagyva	Defensive coaches: Defensive coordinator – Ferenc Szõdy; Defensive line & linebacker coach – Sándor Kovács
