= Nitra Knights =

Slovak American football team

- Sport: American football
- Founded: 1997; 29 years ago
- Stadium: Štadión pod Zoborom, Nitra, Slovakia
- Colours: Black, white, grey

The Nitra Knights are an American football team based in Nitra, Slovakia, established in 1997. The Knights compete in the Czech League of American Football. In 2024, the Nitra Knights became the first team from Slovakia to win the Czech League. In the final, they defeated the Znojmo Knights on home soil. The final was played for the first time in Slovakia. The club plays its home game in the Štadión pod Zoborom.

== History ==
The club was founded in 1997, being one of the oldest clubs in this sport in Slovakia. The club then played several seasons in the Czech League until 2002, after which the team was disbanded. After a six-year break, the club was re-established in 2008. In the 2022 season, the club played in the highest Czech league, where it took 7th place with a record of 3 wins and 5 losses. In the 2023 season, its performances improved and it made it all the way to the semi-finals of the league. The club reached its highest peak in the 2024 season, when it won the Czech Bowl XXXI in front of its home audience of 2,500 spectators at its stadium, beating Znojmo Knights 35–28 to become the first team from Slovakia to win the competition.

== Stadium ==
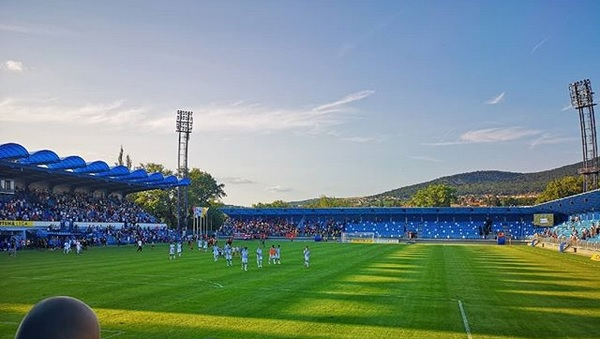
The stadium after its 2018 reconstruction

The Nitra Knights plays its home game in the Štadión pod Zoborom a stadium with a capacity of 7,480. The stadium's capacity increased from 5,050 to approximately 7,246 seats following reconstruction that began in early 2018 and was completed in August 2018. The project included rebuilding the main stand and installing turf heating, with a planned capacity of 7,480 seats and three new roofed stands. The reconstruction costed approximately 8 million euros.
