= Sandro Platzgummer =

Austrian American football player (born 1997)

No. 34 – Frankfurt Galaxy
- Position: Running back
- Roster status: Active

Personal information
- Born: March 10, 1997 (age 29); Innsbruck, Austria
- Listed height: 5 ft 11 in (1.80 m)
- Listed weight: 210 lb (95 kg)

Career information
- NFL draft: 2020: undrafted

Career history
- Swarco Raiders Tirol (2015–2019); New York Giants (2020–2022)*; Raiders Tirol (2023); Frankfurt Galaxy (2024–)
- * Offseason or practice squad member only
- Stats at Pro Football Reference

Sandro Platzgummer (born March 10, 1997) is an Austrian professional American football running back who is currently playing for the Frankfurt Galaxy in the European League of Football. He previously played for the New York Giants in the NFL. In Europe he originally played for the AFL team of the Swarco Raiders Tirol and the Austria national American football team.

== Career ==
=== Swarco Raiders Tirol ===
In Austria, Platzgummer played for his hometown club the Swarco Raiders Tirol of Innsbruck in the Austrian Football League(AFL). He played with the team for five seasons, won two European championships and was named the 2018 Austrian Football League Offensive Player of the Year.

=== New York Giants ===
In 2020, Platzgummer was allocated to the New York Giants via the NFL's International Player Pathway Program, breaking off a 48-yard run in a preseason game against the New York Jets the following year. He was a member of the team's practice squad for three seasons and was released in February 2023.

=== Raiders Tirol (Second stint) ===
After being cut from the New York Giants, Platzgummer re-signed with the Raiders Tirol on April 20, 2023, playing with his older brother and several former teammates. He suffered a season ending knee injury and only managed to play four games, attaining 60 yards on 13 carries.

=== Frankfurt Galaxy ===
Platzgummer signed with the Frankfurt Galaxy in March 2024.

== Personal life ==
Platzgummer has been studying to become a medical doctor since 2017 and currently studies in Frankfurt. He hopes to be an orthopedist or sports physician when his American football career is over.
