= Ljubljana Silverhawks =

- Founded: April 2002; 24 years ago
- Based in: Ljubljana, Slovenia
- Colors: Cobalt blue, silver, white
- Championships: SFL: 2009–10, 2011, 2012, 2013, 2016, 2017 CEFL Bowl: 2012

The Ljubljana Silverhawks were an American football team based in Ljubljana, Slovenia, founded in 2002 by a group of football fans from the Slovenian capital. The team won the Slovenian Football League a record six times (2009–10, 2011, 2012, 2013, 2016, and 2017). They also won the Central European Football League in 2012.

Before the 2019 season, Ljubljana Silverhawks merged with Domžale Tigers.

== History ==
The Ljubljana Silverhawks were established in April 2002, becoming the first American football team based in Slovenia. Initially, the Silverhawks were not affiliated with any league.

In 2006, the Silverhawks were one of the founding members of the Central European Football League (CEFL). In 2009, together with three other teams, the Silverhawks competed in the first-ever edition of the Slovenian Football League. On 26 June 2010, the Silverhawks defeated the Alp Devils 41–0 and thus became the first champions of Slovenia.

The Silverhawks retained the Slovenian Football League title in 2011, after defeating the Croatian team Zagreb Thunder, which competed as the guest team. The Silverhawks won the CEFL title in 2012, and then also won the Slovenian League title in 2012 and 2013, respectively.

In 2016, the Silverhawks joined the Austrian Football League (AFL) and reached the wild card playoffs three times in a row. After the 2018 season, the Silverhawks left the AFL due to financial problems.

== Honours ==
- Slovenian Football League

Champions (6): 2009–10, 2011, 2012, 2013, 2016, 2017

- Central European Football League

Champions (1): 2012
Runners-up (2): 2010, 2014

== Season statistics ==
=== Slovenian Bowl appearances ===
Bowl	Season	Champions	Opponents	Result
Slovenian Bowl I	2009–10	Ljubljana Silverhawks	Alp Devils	41–0
Slovenian Bowl II	2011	Ljubljana Silverhawks	Zagreb Thunder	29–19
Slovenian Bowl III	2012	Ljubljana Silverhawks	Maribor Generals	23–10
Slovenian Bowl IV	2013	Ljubljana Silverhawks	Maribor Generals	45–0
Slovenian Bowl V	2016	Ljubljana Silverhawks	Alp Devils	55–6
Slovenian Bowl VI	2017	Ljubljana Silverhawks	Alp Devils	47–0

=== CEFL Bowl appearances ===
Bowl	Season	Champions	Opponents	Result
CEFL Bowl V	2010	Vukovi Beograd	Ljubljana Silverhawks	42–20
CEFL Bowl VII	2012	Ljubljana Silverhawks	Vukovi Beograd	34–21
CEFL Bowl IX	2014	Vukovi Beograd	Ljubljana Silverhawks	27–17

=== Austrian Football League ===
Year	Finish	Pct.	Games	W	D	L	PF	PA	Postseason
2016	4th	0.400	10	4	0	6	237	272	Won WC: Mödling Rangers (65–18) Lost SF: Tirol Raiders (30–63)
2017	3rd	0.600	10	6	0	4	383	358	Won WC: Mödling Rangers (49–20) Lost SF: Tirol Raiders (27–45)
2018	6th	0.500	10	5	0	5	298	362	Lost WC: Graz Giants (21–28)

- WC = Wild card
- SF = Semi-final
