= Austrian Football League =

American football league in Austria

- Sport: American football
- Founded: 1982; 44 years ago
- First season: 1982
- No. of teams: 8 in top league AFL
- Country: Austria; Czech Republic; Hungary
- Most recent champion: Graz Giants (2026)
- Most titles: Vienna Vikings (15)
- Qualification: Pyramid Tier
- Broadcaster: ORF Sport
- Website: football.at

The Austrian Football League (AFL) is a professional American football league in Austria. The league currently comprises eight teams, and operates on a system of promotion and relegation. It plays by rules based on those of the U.S. National Collegiate Athletic Association (NCAA).

Founded in 1982, the AFL is the highest tier level of American football in the country; below is a tier pyramid system consisting of teams playing in divisions I through IV. Winners of each division move up to the next level of play. The AFL is considered among the best and strongest leagues in Europe.

== History ==
The AFL was founded in 1982 by the teams such as the Salzburg Lions, Graz Giants, Vienna Ducks and Vienna Ramblocks. The first Austrian Bowl was held in 1984 in Salzburg.

The AFL is commonly considered as one of the best American football leagues in Europe. This was especially so in the period from 2004 to 2011, when the European Football League final game the Eurobowl, was won seven out of eight times by an Austrian league AFL team.

In 2010, the Prague Panthers from the Czech Republic joined the league as the first team from outside of Austria. The Panthers were a member of the AFL until the 2016 season. In 2016, the Ljubljana Silverhawks from Slovenia joined, and in 2018, the Bratislava Monarchs from Slovakia entered the league.

The Tyrol Raiders and Vienna Vikings announced their intention to leave for the European League of Football for the 2022 season. However, unlike teams in other countries that have made this move, the reserve team of both remained a participant in the league.

== Foreign import rules and format ==
In the mid to late 1980's with the increase in talent and professionalism throughout the league, a more formalized mechanism was put in place to recruit and fly in former college and free agent football players to play in Austria for pay (salary) as well as room and board. Because homegrown players are one of the main focus points of the league, there are specific rule limitations for the numbers of foreigners. The rule has changed several times over the years. Currently, each roster can have a maximum of 6 American, Canadian, Mexican or Japanese professional import players, with two allowed on the field at the same time.

The regular season currently consists of ten games and starts in mid-March; the playoffs continue through July. The final game, the (Austrian Bowl), was held for the first time in 1984 in Salzburg, Austria.

== Teams ==
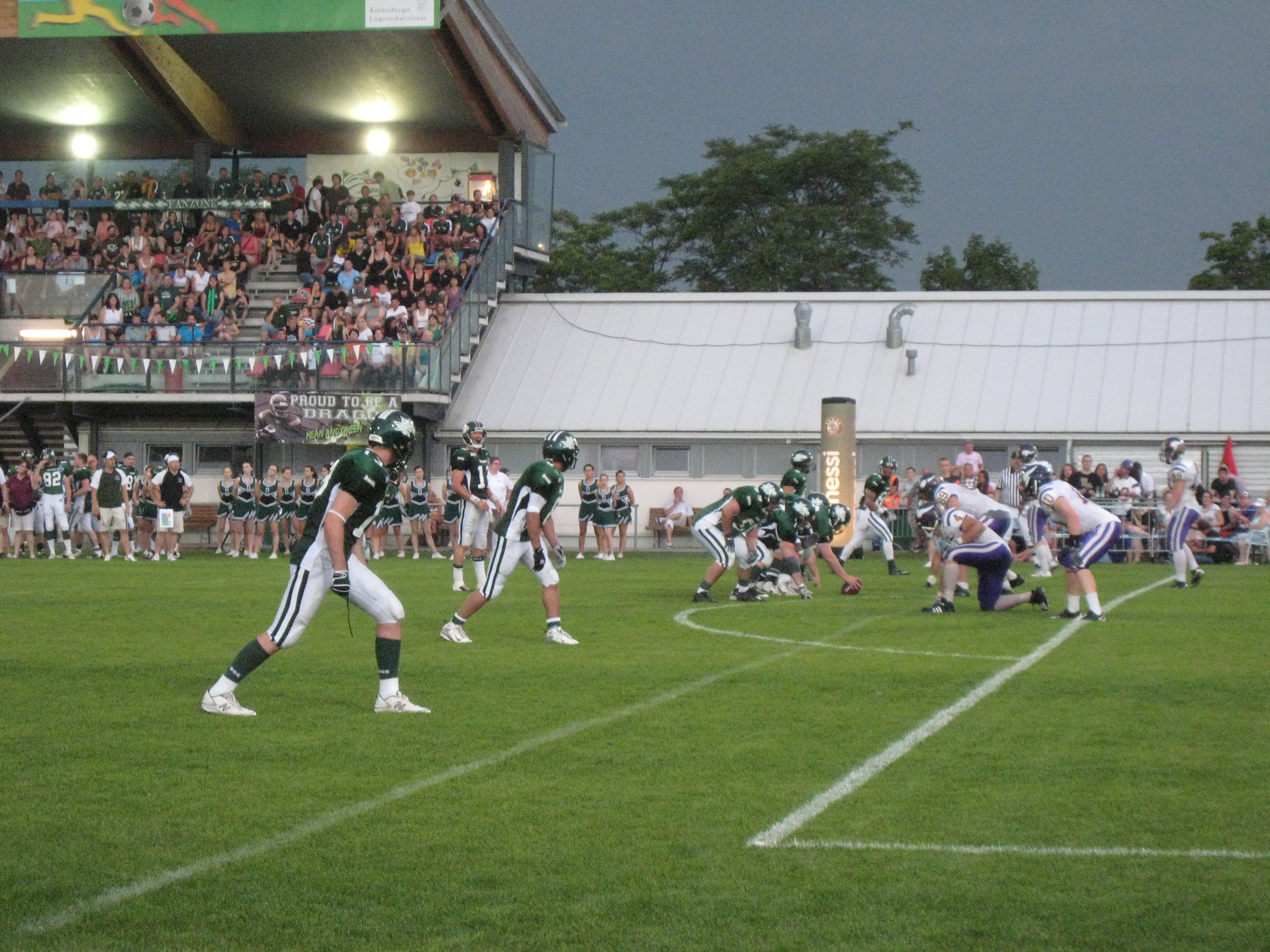
"Blue River Bowl III": Danube Dragons vs. Vikings at Rattenfängerstadion in Korneuburg, 2010

In 2026, the AFL consists of:

- Vienna Vikings
- Graz Giants
- Swarco Raiders Tirol
- Danube Dragons
- Prague Black Panthers
- Salzburg Ducks
- Fehérvár Enthroners
- Vienna Knights

== Austrian Bowl ==
=== All games ===
Bowl	Date	Champions	Runners-up	Score	Location
I	October 20, 1984	Salzburg Lions	Graz Giants	27–10	Salzburg
II	June 28, 1986	Graz Giants	Vienna Vikings	31–12	Salzburg
III	July 5, 1987	Graz Giants	Salzburg Lions	20–0	ASKÖ Schmelz, Vienna
IV	July 3, 1988	Graz Giants	Vienna Vikings	33–15	ASKÖ Schmelz, Vienna
V	July 1, 1989	Salzburg Lions	Graz Giants	34–0	Salzburg
VI	July 1, 1990	Graz Giants	Klosterneuburg Mercenaries	59–7	Linzer Stadion, Linz
VII	July 7, 1991	Graz Giants	Vienna Vikings	38–7	ASKÖ Stadium Eggenberg, Graz
VIII	July 5, 1992	Graz Giants	AFC Rangers Schwarzenau	28–13	ASKÖ Schmelz, Vienna
IX	July 4, 1993	Feldkirch Oscar Dinos	Salzburg Bulls	45–10	BSZ Südstadt, Maria Enzersdorf
X	July 4, 1994	Vienna Vikings	Levi's Graz Giants	45–23	Rudolf-Tonn-Stadion, Schwechat
XI	July 15, 1995	Levi's Graz Giants	Vienna Vikings	26–20	Rudolf-Tonn-Stadion
XII	July 13, 1996	Vienna Vikings	Levi's Graz Giants	41–35	Rudolf-Tonn-Stadion
XIII	July 12, 1997	Levi's Graz Giants	Klosterneuburg Mercenaries	35–14	Rudolf-Tonn-Stadion
XIV	July 18, 1998	Levi's Graz Giants	Vienna Vikings	43–3	BSZ Südstadt, Maria Enzersdorf
XV	July 20, 1999	Chrysler Vikings	Levi's Graz Giants	37–35	Rudolf-Tonn-Stadion
XVI	July 22, 2000	Chrysler Vikings	Papa Joe's Tyrolean Raiders	34–28	Hohe Warte Stadium, Vienna
XVII	July 21, 2001	Chrysler Vikings	Papa Joe's Tyrolean Raiders	24–14	Lindenstadion, Eisenstadt
XVIII	July 20, 2002	Chrysler Vikings	Öko-Box Graz Giants	52–21	Hohe Warte Stadium, Vienna
XIX	July 12, 2003	Chrysler Vikings	Öko-Box Graz Giants	56–42	Hohe Warte Stadium, Vienna
XX	July 17, 2004	Papa Joe's Tyrolean Raiders	Chrysler Vikings	28–20	EM-Stadion Wals-Siezenheim, Salzburg
XXI	July 16, 2005	Chrysler Vikings	Papa Joe's Tyrolean Raiders	43–14	Südstadt, Maria Enzersdorf
XXII	July 14, 2006	Swarco Raiders Tirol	Dodge Vikings	43–19	Hohe Warte, Vienna
XXIII	July 14, 2007	Dodge Vikings	Turek Graz Giants	42–14	Hohe Warte, Vienna
XXIV	June 27, 2008	Turek Graz Giants	Swarco Raiders Tirol	31–21	Lavanttal-Arena, Wolfsberg
XXV	July 18, 2009	Raiffeisen Vikings	Turek Graz Giants	22–19	Asko Stadium Eggenberg, Graz
XXVI	July 9, 2010	Danube Dragons	Swarco Raiders Tirol	28–21	Tivoli-Neu, Innsbruck
XXVII	June 23, 2011	Swarco Raiders Tirol	Raiffeisen Vikings	23–13	Ernst-Happel-Stadion, Vienna
XXVIII	July 28, 2012	Raiffeisen Vikings	Swarco Raiders Tirol	48–34	Hohe Warte, Vienna
XXIX	July 27, 2013	Raiffeisen Vikings	Swarco Raiders Tirol	48–31	NV Arena, Sankt Pölten
XXX	July 26, 2014	Raiffeisen Vikings	Swarco Raiders Tirol	24–17	NV Arena, Sankt Pölten
XXXI	July 11, 2015	Swarco Raiders Tirol	Vienna Vikings	38–0	Wörthersee Stadion, Klagenfurt
XXXII	July 23, 2016	Swarco Raiders Tirol	Graz Giants	51–7	Wörthersee Stadion, Klagenfurt
XXXIII	July 29, 2017	Dacia Vienna Vikings	Swarco Raiders Tirol	45–26	Wörthersee Stadion, Klagenfurt
XXXIV	July 21, 2018	Swarco Raiders Tirol	Dacia Vienna Vikings	51–48	NV Arena, Sankt Pölten
XXXV	July 27, 2019	Swarco Raiders Tirol	Dacia Vienna Vikings	42–34	NV Arena, Sankt Pölten
–	September, 2020	Dacia Vienna Vikings	Graz Giants	3–0 (Note: Due to the coronavirus pandemic the Vikings and the Giants were the only teams entering the competition. Instead of a bowl game, the two teams played a best of five series.)	ASKÖ Eggenberg, Graz; Footballzentrum Ravelin, Wien
XXXVI	July 31, 2021	Swarco Raiders Tirol	Dacia Vienna Vikings	35–14	Tivoli Stadion Tirol, Innsbruck
XXXVII	July 30, 2022	Danube Dragons	Vienna Vikings	51–29	NV Arena, Sankt Pölten
XXXVIII	July 29, 2023	Danube Dragons	Vienna Vikings	14–13	NV Arena, Sankt Pölten
XXXIX	July 28, 2024	Prague Black Panthers	Vienna Vikings	20–14	Wiener Neustadt Arena
XL	July 26, 2025	Vienna Vikings	Danube Dragons	27–17 (Note: The game was annulled due to an incorrectly declared player. The Dragons were declared winner of the season.)	NV Arena, Sankt Pölten
XLI	July 25, 2026	Graz Giants	Danube Dragons	16–14	

=== By team ===
Rank	Teams	Champions	Runners-up
1	Vienna Vikings	15	15
2	Graz Giants	11	11
3	Tirol Raiders	8	9
4	Danube Dragons	4	3
5	Salzburg Bulls	2	2
6	Feldkirch Oscar Dinos	1	0
6	Prague Black Panthers	1	0
7	AFC Rangers	0	1

1: Formerly known as Klosterneuburg Mercenaries

== Notable players and coaches ==
- (United States) David Tenney, player/coach 1989 AFL League national champion, Salzburg Lions North Dakota State Bison
- (Austria) Sandro Platzgummer, RB Raiders Tirol, AFL-Offensive player of the year, NFL with the New York Giants
- (Austria) Bernhard Raimann, TE-OL Vienna Vikings -AFL, currently of the NFL Indianapolis Colts
- (Austria) Bernhard Seikovits, TE Vienna Vikings -AFL, currently NFL Arizona Cardinals
- (Italy) Max Pircher, OL Raiders Tirol -AFL, Currently NFL Minnesota Vikings.
- (United States) Anthony Thompson, 1993 AFL League MVP, Bulls 1993-94 & Mercenaries 1995 RB/LB, NFL for Denver Broncos
- (United States) Eric Beavers, 1992 AFL League MVP, Graz Giants QB 1991–1993. Nevada Wolfpack
- (United States) Doug Wilkerson, Graz Giants OL/DL 1987, was NFL All Pro player for the San Diego Chargers
- (United States) Tony Hunt, RB Vienna Vikings & NFL for Philadelphia Eagles.
- (United States) Todd Hendricks, 1995 AFL League MVP & 1995-96 Offensive player of the year, AFC Rangers WR/RB
- (United States) Dave Dunn (American football), Graz Giants 1991-1992 DL
- (United States) Mark Helfrich, Former Vienna Viking QB 1997, former Oregon Ducks head coach
- (United States) Thomas Smythe, AFL Coach of the year, 1994-2006 Head coach Vienna Vikings, 8 AFL championships, 3 Eurobowl titles
- (United States) Hugh Mendez, 1993 AFL Coach of the year, AFL Champion 1993, head coach Feldkich Dinos 1993–94, Klosterneuburg Mercenaries 1995
- (United States) Rick Rhoades, 2008 AFL Coach of the year, 2007-2011 Head coach Graz Giants, Austrian National team head coach
- (United States) Charles Drake (American football), DB Cinneplex Blue Devils.
- (United States) Emmanuel Moody, Vienna Viking RB, Florida Gators
- (United States) Chris Gunn, AFL League MVP, Graz Giants QB
- (United States) Jason Johnson (quarterback), Swarco Raiders QB 2009.
- (United States) Jaime Kimbrough, Carinthian Cowboys and Lions RB 1999–2001. Fresno State Bulldogs
- (United States) George Paton, Vienna Vikings DB/RB 1993. Current GM for Denver Broncos
- (United States) Sean Shelton, 3 X AFL League MVP, Swarco Raiders QB
- (Germany) Shuan Fatah, AFL Coach of the year, AFL Champion, Eurobowl Champion, head coach Swarco Raiders
- (United States) Kevin Burke, (American Football) 2017 Austrian Bowl Game MVP, Vienna Vikings QB
- (United States) Chris Calaycay, AFL Coach of year & Former Vienna Viking DB, AFL Champions and Eurobowl Champion
- (United States) Cameron Frickey, 1999 AFL Offense POTY, 1998-2003 Vienna Vikings WR & current Woman's National team coach
- (United States) Clinton Graham, AFL Offense POTY, Vienna Vikings, Prague Panthers, and AFC Rangers RB.
- (United States) Eric Marty, 2010 Austrian Bowl game MVP, Danube Dragons QB
- (United States) Germaine Race, 2010 AFL Offense POY, St. Polten Invaders RB. Former NFL player
- (United States) Kyle Newhall-Caballero, 2012 AFL League MVP, Prague Black Panthers QB, NFL player & Scout
- (United States) Darius Robinson, Swarco Tirol Raiders DB & former NFL player, Clemson Tigers football
- (United States) Lance Gustafson, AFL League MVP, Vienna Vikings LB/RB
- (United States) Paul Kujawa, AFL League MVP 1994, Graz Giants RB/LB 1994–96, Iowa Hawkeyes
- (United States) Talib Wise, 2011 Austrian Bowl Game MVP, Swarco Raiders RB
- (United States) Kyle Callahan, Swarco Raiders QB/WR and coach
- (United States) D.J. Hernandez, AFL offense POY, Carinthian Lions QB, Brother of Aaron Hernandez
- (United States) Luke Atwood, Vienna Vikings QB/WR -AFL Offensive player of the year
- (United States) Reece Horn, Vienna Vikings WR- NFL player
- (United States) Geoff Stults, Mercenaries player WR, (now Dragons). Current Hollywood Actor
- (United States) Jonathan Dally, former Dragons QB
- (United States) Brad Strohm, AFC Rangers QB 1995–96, 1998, AFL-Offense POTY 1998 LSU Tigers / Mississippi College
- (United States) Matt Sayre, 1996 AFL league MVP, Graz Giants QB 1994–96
- (United States) Tim Nielson, AFL league MVP 1989, Graz Giants QB/RB 1989–1990,1992

== Austrian teams in international competitions ==
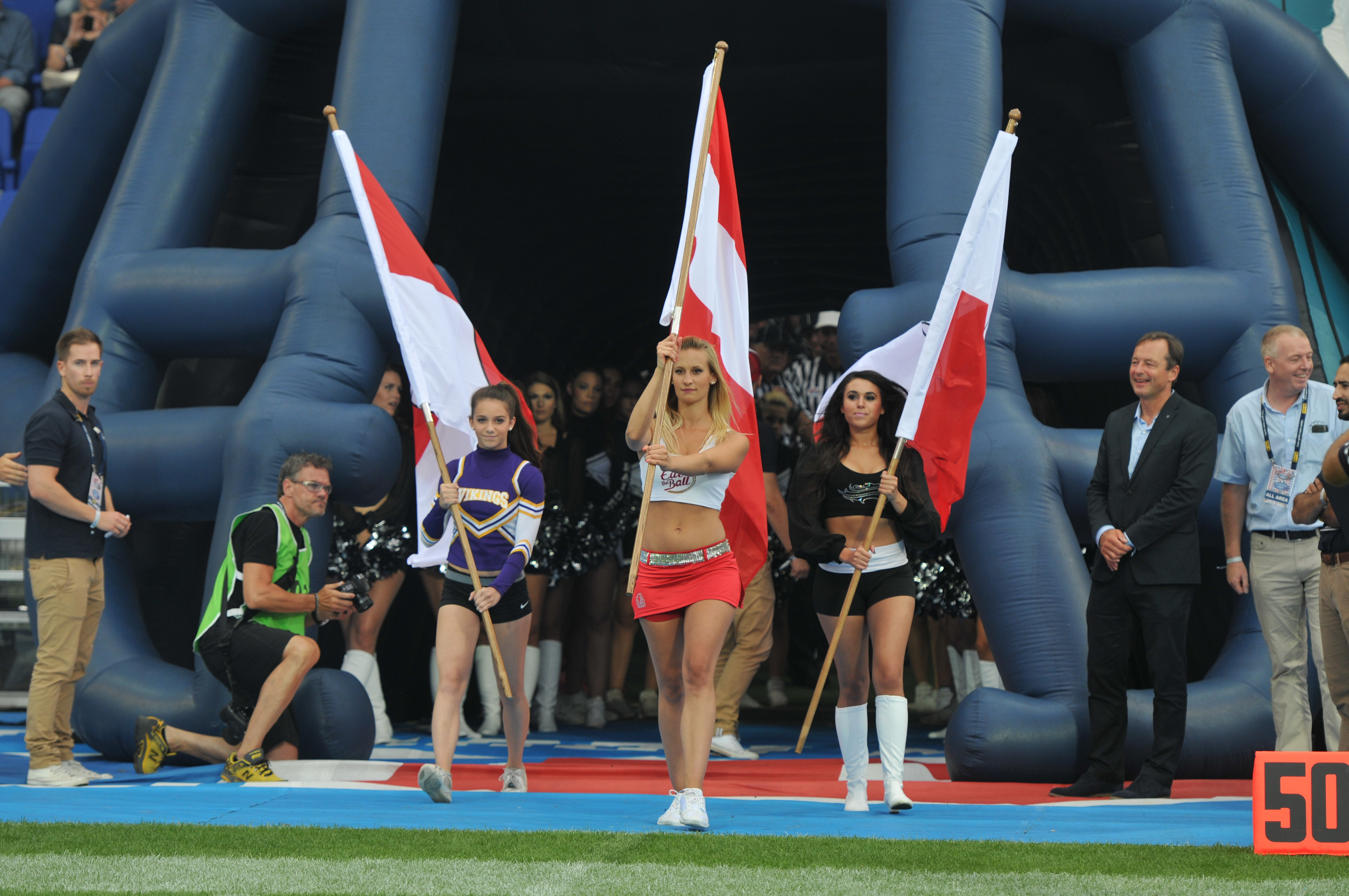
Austrian Bowl XXX

Despite the relatively small size of Austria, both the Austrian national American Football team and individual club teams of the AFL have enjoyed remarkable success in European competitions. The Austrian national team, whose players mostly play in the AFL (with a few also playing in the German Football League), won the final 28–0 over team Finland 2023 European Championship of American football to win the championship title. The National team also has placed third at the 1995 European Championship of American football (hosted in Austria), third place at the 2010 European Championship, second at the 2014 European Championship (hosted in Austria), losing the final in double overtime to Germany in front of 27000 spectators at Vienna's Ernst-Happel-Stadion and placed second again in 2018.

The Vienna Vikings have won the Eurobowl five times and reached the final ten times overall while the Tyrol Raiders have won it three times in five appearances in the final. Furthermore, the Central European Football League has been won five times by Austrian teams both before and after it became a premier European competition.

The AFL Graz Giants own the first known European victory against a US college team in 1991. The Giants won the exhibition game 32–23 against Albany State University. The game was played in the United States on August 31, 1991.
