= Raiders Tirol =

American football team based in Innsbruck, Austria

- Current season
- Logo
- Uniforms

General information
- Founded: 1992; 34 years ago
- Stadium: Tivoli Stadion Tirol
- Headquartered: Innsbruck, Austria
- Colors: Black, silver
- Mascot: Birdie (parrot)
- Website: raiders.at

Personnel
- General manager: Claudia Nuener
- Head coach: Jim Herrmann
- President: Elisabeth Swarovski

League / conference affiliations
- European Football Alliance (since 2026); Austrian Football League; European League of Football (2022-2025)

The Raiders Tirol (for the AFL-Teams SWARCO Raiders Tirol, formerly Papa Joe's Tyrolean Raiders) are an American football team based in Innsbruck, Austria. Founded in 1992, the Raiders since have become one of Austria's and Europe's most dominant American football teams, winning the Eurobowl title three times (2008, 2009, and 2011) and the CEFL also three times (2017–2019). Competing in the Austrian Football League (AFL), the team has won the league championship eight times, most recently in 2021. From 2022 to 2025, the Raiders played in the European League of Football (ELF). In 2026, the Raiders joined the European Football Alliance (EFA).

== History ==
The Swarco Raiders were founded by a small number of American football fans and volunteers back in 1992. Starting in Austria's 3rd division in the 1993 season, the team went unbeaten with an overall score of 158–11. After being promoted to the 2nd division, the team failed to continue its run of 1993, and posted a record of 2–14 in 1994 and 1995. The next two seasons, the Raiders reached the playoffs but lost their semifinals. Due to a league expansion they were promoted to Austria's top division, the AFL, in 1998.

The first two-season on the top level the Raiders lost most of their games. In the 2000 season they made it to the playoffs and played its first championship game, losing to the then Chrysler Vikings Vienna. A year later they repeated their appearance in the final, but again lost to the Vikings.

In 2019, the Swarco Raiders Tirol completed their first perfect season with a record of 16–0 and won Austrian Bowl XXV, as well as the CEFL and ECTC Bowls.

The Raiders employ the most full-time coaches and staff out of all European teams, combined with their special cooperation with the Las Vegas Raiders, many teams, coaches and players regard the Raiders as one of the most well-run organizations in Europe. In 2021 they announced their intention to join the European League of Football for the upcoming 2022 season together with their league rival Vienna Vikings.

=== Retired numbers ===
Raiders Tirol retired numbers
No.	Player	Position	Career	Retired
2	Florian Hueter	Defensive player & coach	2007 – 2021	2021

== Austrian Football League ==
=== First championship (2004) ===
After losing both regular season games against its rival the Vienna Vikings, the team fared much better in post season, beating the Vikings 28–20 in a thrilling game, hosted in Salzburg, Austria and it clinched the club's first national championship. Also in 2004, the team won the EFAF Cup becoming the first Tyrolean team to win an international title, shutting out the P.A Farnham Knights of Great Britain 45–0.

=== Second championship (2006) ===
After losing to the Vikings 43–14 in the bowl game of 2005, the two teams faced each other again in the final of 2006, but this time the team from Innsbruck beat its rival from Austria's capital in a lopsided game with an overall score of 43–19. Again the game was played on neutral ground, as it was held in Maria Enzersdorf, Lower Austria.

=== Third championship (2011) ===
In one of the club's most successful seasons, and one week after winning its third Eurobowl title, the Raiders defeated the Vikings 23–13 in Vienna to win Austrian Bowl XXVII. The victories gave the club both the national championship and the Eurobowl title in the same season, an achievement commonly referred to as "the double" in European American football.

=== Runner-up years (2012–2014) ===
In 2012, 2013, 2014 the Raiders came in second against the Vienna Vikings, who at that time had one of their best runs in history, including a perfect season in 2013. Many of the Raiders' veterans retired after the "double" season of 2011 and the Raiders had trouble replacing some of the most distinguished players in club history, despite the Raiders having more imports on their roster, the Vikings prevailed by running a well-versed spread offense and a hard-hitting defense in those years.

=== Fourth championship (2015) ===
On July 11, 2015, the Raiders defeated the Vikings 38–0, recording their largest margin of victory against the Vienna franchise. The win followed a multi-year roster rebuilding process. Using a combination of local players and imported talent from the United States, the team secured the Austrian championship title.

=== Fifth championship (2016) ===
In 2016, the Raiders once again advanced to the final for the 7th year in a row. The Austrian Bowl XXXII turned out to be a lopsided one, as the Raiders took an early lead over the Graz Giants and coasted to a comfortable 51–7 victory. After another back-to-back championship season, the Raiders again had to stomach an exodus of veteran players, however they were able to retain QB Sean Shelton and their successful coaching staff led by Shuan Fatah.

== European competition ==
In a game against the Vikings, the Swarco Raiders claimed its first Eurobowl-title, as it won 28–24 in 2008. Three of the last four teams in the EFL contest were Austrian, underlining the country's dominance in European football. Neither of the teams who faced in the final was able to claim the Austrian title, as the bowl went to the Graz Giants.

After the Raiders went unbeaten in the 2009 regular season, it let the semi-final game of the AFL slip away, after they gave away a comfortable 21–0 halftime lead and lost the game 22–21 to the Raiffeisen Vienna Vikings. One week later, the team redeemed itself, by winning its second EFL title, beating the French top club Flash de la Courneuve in front of 6500 spectators (at that time a record attendance for an American football game in Austria) in the Tivoli Neu stadium of Innsbruck.

In 2011, the Raiders won their third Eurobowl Championship at the Tivoli Neu stadium of Innsbruck in front of 8600 spectators, which is a new record attendance for American football in Austria.

In 2014, the club took part in a new European competition, the BIG6 European Football League, which consisted of three teams from Germany, two from Austria and one from Switzerland, the clubs being Berlin Adler, New Yorker Lions, Dresden Monarchs, Raiffeisen Vikings Vienna, Swarco Raiders Tirol and the Calanda Broncos. The two best teams of this competition advanced to Eurobowl XXVIII, where the Lions were beat by the Adler. The next season Tirol again took part in the Big 6, once more failing to advance to the final, which was won by Braunschweig against the Schwäbisch Hall Unicorns.

In the 2016 the fortunes of the Raiders improved as they beat the Berlin Adler and Schwäbisch Hall Unicorns, not conceding a single point to advance to Eurobowl XXX against the New Yorker Lions.

The final was played in front of home crowd and after a highly entertaining game, the Raiders suffered two late touchdowns in the 4th quarter and had to succumb to the Lions 21–35.

For the 2017 season, the Raiders withdrew from the "BIG 6" competition due to growing concerns over the high number of import players and the lack of sustainability of this practice. They signed on to compete in the lower-level Central European Football League (CEFL) which they won unbeaten.

=== European League of Football ===
Beginning from the 2022 European League of Football season the now named Raiders Tirol compete with 11 other European teams for the ELF trophy. They start in the central conference together with long-term rival Vienna Vikings, 2021 season champion Frankfurt Galaxy and Stuttgart Surge. The Raiders finished the 2022 ELF season with an 8–4 record and reached the semi-finals of the playoffs.

==== Roster ====
Raiders Tirol roster
Quarterbacks: 15 Stefan Maiacher (Austria); 17 Christian Strong (Canada); Running backs: 25 Tobias Bonatti (Austria); 24 Lukas Haslwanter (Austria); 7 Sandro Platzgummer (Austria); Wide receivers: 80 Fabian Abfalter (Austria); 10 Philipp Haun (Austria); 5 Jarvis McClam (United States); 6 Adrian Platzgummer (Austria); 11 Toni Rabensteiner (Italy); 4 Marco Schneider (Austria); Tight ends: 85 Markus Schaberl (Austria); 87 Richard Weber (Austria)	Offensive linemen: 53 Jeffery Asare (Austria); 78 Daniel Fankhauser RG (Austria); 76 Tobias Haslehner (Austria); 71 Toby Lettman (United Kingdom); 59 Gerd Mitterdorfer C (Italy); 74 Steven Nielsen (Denmark); 72 Basil Weber (Switzerland); 79 Robert Wittmann (Austria); Defensive linemen: 91 Stanley Aronokhale (Austria); 90 Niklas Gustav (Germany); 93 Tinashe Jefferson Chawaguta DT (Austria); 97 Nicolas Melcher DE (Austria); 99 Jeol Maddock (Australia); 92 Laurynas Orlovicius DT (Lithuania); 96 Denis William Butz DT (Germany)	Linebackers: 39 Sebastian Huber (Austria); 13 Lucky Ogbevoen OLB (Austria); 43 Precious Ogbevoen (Austria); 55 Julian Perfler ILB (Austria); 20 Patrick Pilger (Austria); 1 Ruben Seeber (Austria); 48 Philipp Timmermann OLB (Germany); 33 Tim Unger (Germany); Defensive backs: 21 Divine Buckrham (United States); 9 Thomas Kugler S (Germany); 18 Gregory Laday (United States); 3 Jan Mayerhofer S (Austria); 14 Jessey Mensah (Austria); 23 Vincent Müller CB (Austria); 8 Christoph Nitzlnader CB (Austria); 28 Fabian Raunig (Austria); 32 Matthias Rebl (Austria); 35 Clemens Voit (Austria); Special teams: 18 Niklas Sanin K (Austria)	Rookies in italics Roster updated 17 June 2023; 4 A-import, 6 E-import, 36 homegrown 46 active

=== Transactions ===
From Frankfurt Galaxy: Ja'Len Embry
From Vienna Vikings: Sebastian Huber

==== Staff ====
Raiders Tirol staff
Front office: President – Elisabeth Swarovski; General Manager – Ulz Däuber; Team Manager – Paul-Philipp Lasch; Head coach: Head coach – Kevin Herron; Offensive coaches: Offensive coordinator/wide receiver – Kyle Callahan; Quarterbacks – n/a; Running backs – Frank Roser; Tight ends – n/a; Offensive line – Dominik Bauer	Defensive coaches: Defensive coordinator/defensive backs – Malik Jackson; Linebacker – Simon Riedl; Defensive line – Eugen Kremser; Special teams coaches: Special teams coordinator – n/a; Assistant coaches: Mental/breathwork choach – Frank Roser; Strength and conditioning: Head strength and conditioning – Andreas Pröller; Staff updated 23 March 2023

== Honours ==
- European League of Football
  - Playoffs: (1) 2022
- Eurobowl
  - Champions: (3) 2008, 2009, 2011
  - Runners-up: (2) 2013, 2016
- Central European Football League
  - Champions: (3) 2017–2019
  - Runners-up: (1) 2021
- Austrian Bowl
  - Champions: (8) 2004, 2006, 2011, 2015, 2016, 2018, 2019, 2021
  - Runners-up: (9) 2000, 2001, 2005, 2008, 2010, 2012–2014, 2017

== Exhibition games against US college teams ==
The SWARCO Raiders board has stated that they will place a greater emphasis on trans-atlantic competition and thus have begun scheduling college football teams as future opponents. The long-term plan includes establishing a bowl game for USA College football teams to be played against the SWARCO Raiders in Innsbruck. Previously in 2001 the Raiders won a game 33–6 against Division III Centre College from Kentucky. In 2016, the Raiders played and won against Division III Elmhurst College "Bluejays" with a final score of 24–10. For 2017, the Raiders played against the Benedictine Ravens (NAIA) from Kansas losing to in the final seconds. In 2018 the Raiders hosted Division III Central College from Iowa. The Swarco Raiders won in a hard-fought game.

== Sponsors ==
The Raiders' main sponsor and namesake is the SWARCO corporation, a leading manufacturer of traffic lights, signals and road surface markings. Further sponsors include Uniqa Insurance Group, the Tiroler Tageszeitung newspaper, electric utility provider Tiroler Wasserkraft (TIWAG) and others.
