= American football in the Netherlands =

International affairs of American football

American football in the Netherlands has been on the map both nationally and internationally since the 1980s. However, it took almost 40 years before the first American football game played in the Netherlands was followed up. In 1946 two American University teams played an exhibition game in the Olympic Stadium (Amsterdam). Not until 1980 did the following step appear, when René Koningferander issued a request on the TV sports programme 'Sprekershoek' for people who were interested in the sport.

Koningferander had been introduced to the sport by his gymnastics teacher Guus Annokkee who would go on to be the founder and inaugural chairman of the NAFF (Nederlandse American Football Federatie). Koningferander's TV plea instigated the founding of the Netherlands' first domestic club: the Amsterdam Rams.

== History ==
=== 1981–1984: Growth of interest ===
The first game played by an American football team from the Netherlands was on Easter Sunday in 1981 when the Amsterdam Rams faced the Herne Tigers from Germany. A lack of any Dutch opponents forced the Rams to compete in the German Oberliga in the 1983 and 1984 season. This successful German adventure led the Rams to a 1984 victory in the Oberliga Nord Division.

Meanwhile, initiatives were springing up all over the Netherlands via exhibition games and the broadcasting of college football by the fledgling SkyChannel. From these flames a number of Dutch clubs emerged including The Hague Raiders, Delft Dragons, Rotterdam Trojans, Zwolle Bulldogs, Alphen Eagles and Utrecht Vikings. Toward the end of 1984 a number of players from the Amsterdam Rams broke off to form a second team from the nation's capital city: the Amsterdam Crusaders.

The Rams returned to the Netherlands and, along with the new teams, formed the Nederlandse American Football Federatie (NAFF).

=== 1985–1989: Dutch competition ===
The first Dutch American Football season took place in 1985. Eight teams in a single division would compete against each other for a place in the Dutch championship game initially called the "Super Bowl". The first championship game saw the Amsterdam Rams face their former teammates the Amsterdam Crusaders. The Rams won the only Super Bowl - from 1986 the championship game was renamed the Tulip Bowl.

Many factors combined to produce explosive growth in this new sport which had been imported from the United States. The number of teams grew from 8 in 1985 to around 40 by the end of the 1980s. In addition, the teams from larger cities were able to professionalise further by obtaining large sponsors, attracted by the freshness of the sport and the considerable media attention both in the TV and press, which enabled them to hire American players and coaches.

In 1986 the Netherlands organised Eurobowl I - the final of the European championship for national champions. The Amsterdam Rams achieved a respectable 3rd place in the Olympic Stadium in Amsterdam, with the Finnish Taft Vantaa claiming 1st place.

1987 saw the NAFF run a full Dutch competition with no less than 3 divisions. This season also saw the debut of Dutch officiating crews, supported by officials from the US airbase in Soesterberg.

=== Early 1990s: Dutch Dynasty? ===
The early 1990s saw the growth of American Football in the Netherlands settle down. The obvious next step was to look to the future. Youth teams and a youth competition were formed, and flag teams for the youngest participants. The top division of senior competition saw an enormous increase of quality, aided by the import of US players and coaches. By this time the Dutch competition was considered one of the strongest in the whole of Europe. In 1993, two Dutch teams made it to the semi-finals of the Eurobowl: The Amsterdam Crusaders and The Hague Raiders. The Amsterdam Crusaders (who had dominated the NAFF competition between 1987 and 1991) showed their class at European level by reaching 5 Eurobowl finals and winning the European championship in 1991 and 1992, sparking talk of a "Dutch dynasty". The Dutch National team, the Dutch Lions, won the bronze medal in the European Championships in Helsinki, Finland, in 1991. Head coach at the time was coach John Ralston.

=== Late 1990s: Challenging Times ===
The mid-nineties saw the growth of the sport stagnate in the Netherlands, bringing about the demise of several clubs. The novelty of the sport wore off and it was evident in the diminishing interest of sponsors. Television exposure was no longer to be taken for granted and the growth of the youth competition was suffering. Conversely the sport was undergoing a renaissance in the rest of Europe, with media interest and crowds growing. This situation forced the decision by the Amsterdam Crusaders to pull out of the Dutch competition and instead compete in the ill-fated Football League of Europe in 1994 and 1995

While the sport was struggling in the Netherlands, bigger thing were afoot for American Football on a global scale. 1991 saw the birth of the World League of American Football (WLAF). This precursor to NFL Europa was a professional competition founded and funded by the US league: the NFL. The intentions of the WLAF were two-fold: to increase the popularity of the sport in Europe and to act as a feeder league to the NFL, testing out young players who were on the brink of breaking into the NFL. These developments had a large influence on Dutch American Football.

By the end of the 1990s American Football as a sport in the Netherlands was in crisis. Only a third of teams had survived, no sponsors were involved in the sport, and the level had suffered as a result. At the same time, the Amsterdam Admirals of NFL Europa were pulling in crowds of 12,000 for home games - many of them spectators who ten years earlier would have been supporting the teams in the Dutch competitions.

== See also ==
- American Football Bond Nederland
- List of American football teams in the Netherlands
- Tulip Bowl
