= Bronco (disambiguation) =

Bronco (also Bronko) originally referred to a horse that bucks or is untrained.

Bronco or Broncos or Bronko may also refer to:

== People ==
=== Given name ===
- Bronko Djura (born 1964), Australian former rugby league footballer
- Bronco Horvath (1930–2019), Canadian retired National Hockey League player
- Bronko Lubich (1925–2007), Hungarian professional wrestler and manager
- Bronco McKart (born 1971), boxer and former World Boxing Association light middleweight champion
- Bronco Mendenhall (born 1966), college football head coach
- Bronko Nagurski Jr. (1937–2011), Canadian Football League player, son of Bronko Nagurski

=== Nickname ===
- Jaime Rodríguez Calderón (born 1957), aka "El Bronco", Mexican politician
- Bronco Lane (born 1945), former British Army major, author and mountain climber
- Bronco McLoughlin (1938–2019), Irish actor, stuntman and animal trainer
- Bronko Nagurski (1908–1990), National Football League Hall-of-Fame player

=== Stage name or ring name ===
- José "El Bronco" Venegas, Mexican singer
- Bronco (wrestler) (born 1989), Mexican luchador enmascarado (masked professional wrestler)
- Ramón Álvarez (wrestler), Dominican wrestler with the ring name "El Bronco"

=== Surname ===
- Seth Bronko, American politician elected to the Connecticut House of Representatives in 2022

== Music ==
- Bronco (English band), an English rock/country band fronted by singer Jess Roden
- Bronco (Mexican band), a Mexican band
- Bronco: La Serie, a 2019 album by the Mexican band Bronco
- El Bronco, an album by José "El Bronco" Venegas
- Bronco (Canaan Smith album), 2015, or the title song
- Bronco (Orville Peck album), 2022

== Sports ==
=== Professional ===
- Aspley Broncos, a rugby league team from Australia
- Bonymaen Broncos, a Welsh rugby league team founded in 2011
- Brisbane Broncos, a rugby league team from Australia
- Broncos de Caracas, a Venezuelan basketball team
- C.D. Broncos, a Honduran soccer team
- Calanda Broncos, an American football team from Switzerland
- Calgary Broncos, a World Hockey Association team in the 1970s
- Denver Broncos, a National Football League team
- Laredo Broncos (2006–2010), a former baseball team
- London Broncos, a British rugby league team
- Rochester Broncos, an American Association baseball team that played only one season, in 1890
- Saitama Broncos, a professional basketball team in Tokorozawa, Saitama, Japan
- Wipptal Broncos, an Italian ice hockey team

=== Junior ===
- Humboldt Broncos, a junior ice hockey team from Humboldt, Saskatchewan, Canada
- Kamloops Broncos, a junior football team from Kamloops, British Columbia, Canada
- Lethbridge Broncos, a defunct junior ice hockey team from Lethbridge, Alberta, Canada
- Swift Current Broncos, a junior ice hockey team from Swift Current, Saskatchewan, Canada

=== Collegiate ===
- Boise State Broncos, NCAA Division I university
  - Bronco Stadium
- Cal Poly Pomona Broncos, NCAA Division II university
- Fayetteville State University, NCAA Division II university
- Santa Clara University, NCAA Division I university
- State University of New York at Delhi Broncos, NJCAA university
- University of Central Oklahoma Bronchos, NCAA Division II university
- Western Michigan Broncos, NCAA Division I university

=== Other sports ===
- Bronco, a combat robot competing in BattleBots
- Enschede Broncos, an American football club from Enschede, Netherlands

== Vehicles ==
- Bronco All Terrain Tracked Carrier, a Singaporean built articulated tracked carrier
- Ducati Bronco, a motorcycle
- Ford Bronco, a four-wheel drive utility automobile
- North American Rockwell OV-10 Bronco, a military light attack and observation aircraft

== Other uses ==
- Bronco (TV series), a Western series featuring Ty Hardin
- Bronco: The Series, a Mexican biographical series on Bronco
- Bronco Wine Company, a California vintner
- Fender Bronco, an electric guitar model
- Bronco, Georgia, an unincorporated community

== See also ==
- Broncho (disambiguation)
