= Terry Smith (American football, born 1959) =

American sportsman

- Born: Terry Michael Smith; 1959 (age 66–67); Linville, North Carolina, United States
- Education: Furman University
- Occupations: Former American football player; American football coach; owner; businessman
- Spouse: Sara Smith
- Children: 5
- Football career

Profile
- Position: Defensive back

Personal information
- Listed height: 6 ft 0 in (1.83 m)
- Listed weight: 197 lb (89 kg)

Career information
- College: Furman
- NFL draft: 1982 Free Agent: undrafted

Career history

Playing
- New England Patriots (1982–1983); Arizona Wranglers (1984); Manchester Spartans (1988–1998)

Coaching
- Manchester Spartans (1988–1998); Great Britain (1989)

Awards and highlights
- As a head coach and player: 3 Division Championships; 3 Conference Championships; 2× British League National Champion (1989, 1990); Budweiser Bowl Champion (1989); Coca-Cola Bowl Champion (1990); Eurobowl Champion (Eurobowl IV Championship 1990); European Nations Championship 1989; American Football Association (AFA) Hall of Fame (1995)

Terry Smith Receives The National Championship Trophy at Crystal Palace in London, England

Terry Michael Smith (born May 1959) is an American sportsman, known for his college and professional playing and head coaching career in American football, baseball, track, and soccer, where his teams have won 14 championships, including three national championships and two European championships, for being the Great Britain National Team head coach for American football where his Great Britain Team won Britain's first-ever European Championship in 1989, for being chosen to the British Football Hall of Fame and to the International Pro Football Hall of Fame, for his ownership of professional sports teams in American football, soccer, and baseball in three countries, for his ownership of a television network that he built from one cable network in two counties to sixteen cable networks in six states, and where he only allowed positive news stories and positive television programs to be shown on the network because he Believes in his philosophy that "You create your World by what you think about", for creating and hosting the Veterans Voice television show series for eight years so he could honor and show his great respect for our American military veterans, interviewing and telling the life stories of more than 300 veterans from World War II, the Korean War, the Vietnam War, and the Gulf War that are archived in libraries and war museums, for his career in education that has included him being a college professor and head of two departments in the School of Business, for being the director of a high school where he built a brand new innovative educational program that resulted in the school being chosen as one of the Top 10 high schools in the United States, for being invited by the U.S. Congress to speak with the U.S. Congress on Capitol Hill in Washington DC about the Future of Education in America, for being considered the inspiration for the Ted Lasso character and television show, for being the originator of Ted Lasso's Believe Philosophy, and for championing women's sports on both sides of the Atlantic by having one of the first Women's soccer teams in England and by working with the Women's football associations in England to provide free use of his stadium for major Women's Cup matches and Finals so he could help them to build the sport, and by being the League President of the 60-team Women's Football Alliance located at the Pro Football Hall of Fame Stadium in Canton, Ohio, where he has worked to build personal growth and career development for all 3,000 of the women playing in the WFA through initiatives such as an educational partnership with online education company edX and a partnership with the NFL Alumni Association.

After starting his playing career as a defensive back for American football franchise New England Patriots, Smith moved abroad to the United Kingdom, where he achieved international success as the player and head coach of the Manchester Spartans, winning multiple national championships and European championships. Smith was also head coach of the Great Britain National American football team, winning the European Nations Championship in 1989. He later spent ten years as owner and general manager of professional American football teams, and two years as owner and general manager of English soccer club Chester City from 1999 to 2001, including a spell as manager during part of his ownership.

In October 2024, Smith became the president of the Women's Football Alliance, a nationwide League of more than 60 teams that plays in three Divisions across the United States, and plays its National Championships at the NFL Hall of Fame Stadium in Canton, Ohio, in games broadcast on ESPN.

In March 2025, Smith purchased the Brantford Red Sox, a legendary 115-year-old professional baseball team in Ontario Canada's Canadian Baseball League that has won a record 15 League Championships.

== Collegiate career ==
Smith graduated from Avery County High School in Newland North Carolina, and because he skipped a grade and graduated a year early, then he also graduated from The Asheville School in Asheville, N.C., where he played four sports, football, basketball, wrestling, and baseball.

He played quarterback and defensive back in football, was twice chosen as the First Team All-Conference Quarterback and twice chosen as the MVP, was awarded the Valier award in football at Asheville School, and he led Avery to its first winning season and first Conference Championship in school history.

Smith earned nine letters in total, three letters in football, one in basketball, one in wrestling, and four in baseball.

He and his teams won Conference Championships in football, basketball, and wrestling, finishing second in baseball. Smith was chosen First Team All-Conference in baseball and MVP, All-Conference in wrestling, and won the Conference wrestling tournament where he was voted the most outstanding wrestler in the tournament.

Smith attended Cornell University for two years, where he played American football at wide receiver and free safety and baseball at shortstop and second base.

He then transferred to Furman University, where he played football, baseball, and ran track, becoming the only Furman athlete for the past 50 years to play and letter in three sports. In football, he started at free safety for two years on two Southern Conference Championship Furman teams, leading all defensive backs with more than 150 tackles in two seasons, and being selected to the Academic All-Southern Conference and All-Region teams. He was chosen as the State of South Carolina College Defensive Player of the Week for his outstanding performance in a game versus VMI in 1980, and he was also chosen as the Player of the Week for his performances in games versus both The University of North Carolina in 1980 and The University of Florida in 1981. In the three games combined, Smith totaled 59 tackles, 1 tackle for loss, 3 passes defended, 3 fumbles caused, 1 fumble recovered, and 1 pass interception.

As shown in the Furman Baseball Media Guide, in baseball he started for two seasons in centerfield, hitting .414 in 1982, the 5th highest single season batting average in Furman baseball history that began in 1896, the second highest in history since full batting records have been kept.

Furman University baseball award plaque on display in the baseball office for Terry Smith.

Smith finished his Furman baseball career with a .363 career batting average, which is still the second-highest career batting average in Furman history, which is actually the highest career average in history since full batting records have been kept, and he has the highest career Furman batting average for the past sixty years.

Smith was also selected as the first-team All-Southern Conference centerfielder and MVP, and he stole 29 bases out of 31 attempts, giving him the highest career success rate for steals in Furman history.

In track, he ran the 100 meter, 200 meter, and 400 meter, and he also ran the 4x100, 4x200, and 4x400 relays. Smith was nominated for the Southern Conference Athlete of the Year.

== American football ==
=== Professional career ===
Smith started his professional American football career in 1982, signing as a free agent by the New England Patriots, leading the team in interceptions and leading all defensive backs in tackles during training camp. However, as the headhunter on the kick-off team he injured his knee while he was making a tackle in a game against the Philadelphia Eagles, an injury that required reconstructive surgery to repair a torn ACL, torn MCL, and a completely avulsed cartilage, and with the surgery he was later placed on the injured reserve list.

Furman University's Terry Smith came all the way around from third to score the tying tun on this headfirst slide into home

Terry Smith, Furman University's only three-sport athlete for the past 70 years, is pictured after competing in the 100-meter, 200-meter, and 400-meter at a Furman track meet.

During his career, Smith played in the World's Fair Game in Knoxville, Tennessee, against the Pittsburgh Steelers, a game that had 104,000 spectators, the third largest attendance for a game in NFL history, and his Patriots team made the NFL play-offs in 1982. He stayed with the Patriots for two years before eventually having to retire from the NFL because his injured knee would not pass the team physical at the time. He returned to the football field signing for the Arizona Wranglers in the USFL in 1984, and in professional baseball was invited to spring training with the Cincinnati Reds and signed with the Miami Marlins of the Florida State League(A+), a club that owned the Major League Baseball franchise rights for the city of Miami, who exercised those rights to become the MLB's Florida Marlins based in Miami, and then returned to its original name as the current MLB's Miami Marlins.

Terry Smith sprinting downfield as the headhunter on the New England Patriots kick-off team versus the Pittsburgh Steelers.

In 1988, Smith signed to play and coach for the Manchester Spartans American football team overseas in Great Britain’s British American Football Association. As a wide receiver and free safety from 1988 to 1998, Smith set more than 25 playing records with the Spartans, including setting the then National and League record for pass interceptions in a season with 11, and setting the National and British record for pass receptions in a single game with 15 pass receptions for 245 yards on July 7, 1991. His career best receiving yards season in Great Britain was 1988 with 1020 yards. He finished with more than 300 career pass receptions for more than 5,000 yards, and he retired as the all-time League career leader in interceptions. He twice led Europe in receiving for a season, he led Europe in interceptions for a season, and he was named to the All-Europe Team on several occasions as both a wide receiver and as a free safety. In 2004, Great Britain's governing body for American football chose Smith as the greatest defensive player in the history of the sport in Great Britain.

Terry Smith of The New England Patriots tackles a Pittsburgh Steelers running back in The World's Fair Game with 104,000 spectators at Neyland Stadium, Knoxville, Tennessee.

=== Coaching career ===
After coaching at U.S. colleges, Smith went to Great Britain after signing with the Manchester Spartans football club in the NFL-sponsored League. After leading the Manchester Spartans from a 2–10 season to a 14–0 record in 1988, Smith was appointed head coach of the Great Britain national American football team. As the Manchester Spartans head coach, he won three straight Division Championships, three straight Conference Championships, two straight British National Championships, one Budweiser Bowl championship in 1989 at Crystal Palace in London, England, one Coca-Cola Bowl championship in 1990 at Crystal Palace in London, England, one Eurobowl championship with the Manchester Spartans in 1990 in Rimini, Italy, and one European Championship in Hamburg, Germany as the National team head coach with the Great Britain National Team in 1989.

As the head coach of the Great Britain national team, he took over a Great Britain team that had never won a single game against European competition, and in his first year Smith and his British national team defeated France 35–6 in the European Quarter-Final in a game played in Birmingham, England, defeated Germany 38–6 in the European Semi-Final in a game played in Hamburg, Germany, and defeated Finland 26–0 in the European Nations Championship Final in Hamburg, Germany to win Great Britain's first-ever European Championship.

Terry Smith outruns the coverage and breaks free for The New England Patriots.

At the same time Smith was coaching the Great Britain National Team, he was the player/head coach of the Manchester Spartans, where he led the Spartans to the Great Britain national championship in 1989 and qualified the Spartans for the European Football League 1990 European Professional Club Championship competition, called the EuroBowl. In the 1990 EuroBowl, Smith led his Spartans to victories over the Dublin Celts from Ireland in a game played in Dublin, Ireland, over the Amsterdam Crusaders from the Netherlands in the European Quarter-Final in a game played in Manchester, England, over the Berlin Adler from Germany in the European Semi-Final in a game played in Rimini, Italy, and over the Legnano Frogs from Italy in the European Championship Final in Rimini, Italy, to win the 1990 Eurobowl Championship. Until Smith and his Spartans, no British Club had ever won a single game in European competitions, but Smith's Spartans went 4-0 and won the entire European Championship in their first attempt. Smith and his Spartans also played in the Schweppes Cool Masters European Final in Hamburg, Germany in 1992.

With the Great Britain National Team, Smith led Great Britain to victories over France, Germany, and Finland by a combined score of 99–12 to win the 1989 European Nations Championship.

Terry Smith being interviewed by NBC after The World's Fair Game with 104,000 spectators at Neyland Stadium, Knoxville, Tennessee.

Before Smith became head coach, no British Club or Great Britain National Team had ever won a game in European competition. Under Smith's leadership, the Manchester Spartans and the Great Britain National Team won all 7 European games they played, with both of Smith's teams winning their European competitions, the first European championships ever won by British teams in history. As a result of these successes, Smith was nominated by Queen Elizabeth II for national end-of-year awards.

From August 5th, 1989 to August 4th, 1990, so one day less than a year, Terry Smith and his two teams, the Manchester Spartans and The Great Britain National Team won 6 Championships in 3 Countries, Player/Head Coach Smith and his Manchester Spartans won The Great Britain National Championship on August 5th, 1989 at Crystal Palace Stadium in London, England, Player/Head Coach Smith and his Spartans won The Budweiser Bowl Championship on August 5th, 1989 at Crystal Palace Stadium in London, England, Head Coach Terry Smith and his Great Britain National Team won The European Nations Championship on August 27th, 1989 at the 57,000-seat Volksparkstadion in Hamburg, Germany, Player/Head Coach Terry Smith and his Manchester Spartans won the European Team Championship on July 28th, 1990, in Rimini, Italy, Player/Head Coach Smith and his Spartans won the Coca-Cola Bowl Championship on August 4th, 1990 at Crystal Palace Stadium in London, England, and Player/Head Coach Terry Smith and his Spartans won The Great Britain National Championship on August 4th, 1990 at Crystal Palace Stadium in London England. Six Championships in three Countries in only 364 days has to be the most Championships that any football coach in the history of American football or any other team sport has ever won anywhere in the world. This is not to mention the two Division Championships and two Conference Championships that Smith and his Spartans team also won during that year, giving Smith a total of 10 Championships during that year. All these Championships are shown in the following citations and are also shown in photographs on this page and photographs and newspaper articles on Terry Smith's We Believe For America in media and history, photos and articles.

According to available records, Smith was the first coach to win both the European club championship and the European Nations Championship. He won more than 100 games in total as a head coach, while losing only 15. Due to his coaching success, Smith was selected as the National Coach of the Year three straight times, and as the European Coach of the Year twice. In addition, due to his playing and coaching success, Smith was selected to the Great Britain American Football Hall of Fame in 2004, and to the American Football Association (AFA) Hall of Fame in 1995 as one of only three Hall of Fame members to ever be chosen in the International category.

== Professional sports team ownership ==
Terry Smith, Furman's free safety, leaps to the crossbar of the goalpost to save a touchdown and intercept a pass in the end zone in the Furman Paladins' 28-7 victory.

Smith became the owner of several professional sports teams, including the European Champions of American football

Terry Smith, Furman University's free safety, sprints through the offensive and defensive lines to tackle the Virginia Military Institute fullback for a loss in Furman's 21-16 Division 1 Southern Conference victory.

Manchester Spartans. In July 1999, he bought financially struggling English League club Chester City, making him the first American owner, chairman, and chief executive in the history of European football. He declared his belief that the club could reach Division One (now the EFL Championship) within three years. The club was in administration when he took over, and close to folding with

more than £1 million in debt. Supporters credited Smith with helping prevent Chester City from folding. He also appointed three supporters to the club's board of directors.

At the time of Smith's takeover, most veteran players had been sold and the remaining players were mostly young. He kept these young players and tried to develop them in order to keep the player wages low, so that the club could not only balance the budget for that season, but also so they could try to pay off the £1 million of debt that Smith inherited.

Furman free safety Terry Smith makes a crushing tackle on Virginia Military Institute tight end late in 4th Quarter near the Furman end zone to cause a fumble and then recover the fumble himself to win the game for Furman 21-16 in Division 1 action.

Using this low budget strategy, along with increasing revenue through good Cup runs in the FA Cup and the Worthington Cup, increased attendance and commercial advertising, and with Smith serving as both manager and general manager for free at no cost to the club, then Smith was able to get all the club's debts paid off within only five months, which was two and a half years earlier than the administration required. As a result, the club was out of debt for the first time in at least many decades.

In Smith's four months and 21 league matches in charge of team affairs, Chester managed wins against Brighton & Hove Albion, Shrewsbury Town and others, but lost 5–1 and 4–1 to Leyton Orient and Carlisle United respectively, and required a replay to overcome non-league minnows Whyteleafe in the FA Cup. However, they did find success in the Worthington Cup, beating First Division Port Vale 6–5 on aggregate; they won 2–1 at the Deva Stadium in a game which saw both Marcus Bent and Martyn Lancaster sent off, and then drew 4–4 in the return leg at Vale Park.

They also had success in the FA Cup, as they made it to the third round for just the third time in the club's 100-year history. Drawn against Manchester City, they only lost in the final minutes after the score was tied at 1–1 with eleven minutes left. While scouting Man City ahead of the match, Smith, who came up with a strategy and team plan for the Man City match, found that when he could watch a match from up in the stands, then he was able to see the necessary tactical adjustments because of his many years of experience coaching American football, where coaches scout opponents by spending hundreds of hours every season watching game footage of their opponents that is filmed from high in the stands. This skill would benefit the team considerably the following season when Smith would scout all of Chester's impending Cup opponents and the team made it to the 3rd Round of the FA Cup against Blackburn Rovers, made it past five opponents to get to the Semi-Final of the national cup the FA Trophy, and won the Nationwide Trophy that was the first Cup Championship in 50 years, and still the only Cup Championship for the past 80 years.

Furman free safety Terry Smith, pictured number 29 in middle, was chosen the Defensive Player of the Game versus The University of North Carolina as Smith made 19 tackles and caused two fumbles, both recovered by Furman.

His methods included saying aloud the Lord's Prayer during his pre-match team talk, preparing lengthy written strategic game plans for each match that he went over in his pre-match team talk and gave copies of to each player, always staying positive no matter the current difficulties and circumstances, developing a school program where he went with players to speak with and coach schoolchildren, and to give out free tickets to each child for the upcoming matches, and appointing captains for the defense, midfield and attack.

In late December 1999, with Chester out of debt and on firm financial footing for the first time in decades, Smith chose to step down as manager. His decision came only one match after his team had pulled itself off the bottom of the Division following a 2–1 win over Halifax Town. Smith hired veteran manager Ian Atkins to the dual role of director of football and manager in a bid to avoid relegation, while Smith himself took on the role of goalkeeper coach for the remainder of the season.

With improvements in the club's financial position, the club was able to sign twelve new players that Atkins wanted and chose, doubling the player wage bill compared with when Smith was manager. The club was also able to afford to pay for team travel by luxury coaches to away matches instead of the regular buses used during Smith's period, and was able to pay for the team to stay at top hotels with excellent pre-match meals for all away matches instead of traveling to matches by bus on match day as had occurred during Smith's time period. The club also paid for a new training facility with two training pitches for Atkins' team, while Smith's team had to train on a free piece of unlined grass in the middle of a horse racetrack. However, despite these financial investments in the team, the team began slowly under Atkins, losing seven of his first nine matches in charge, with only one win and one draw, and falling well adrift at the bottom of the Division table. Atkins' team lost his ninth match in charge by a 7–1 score at home to Brighton & Hove Albion, even though Smith's young team had defeated Brighton 3–2 away at Brighton earlier in the season.

Afterwards, however, results began to improve, and a 5–0 home victory over Mansfield Town in April, where Smith signee Angus Eve, Trinidad & Tobago's career leading goal scorer with 43 national team goals, scored two goals, put Chester in a better position in the table.

Going into the final game of the season, Chester had pulled themselves up to 23rd in the 24-team division, and faced a three-way battle with Shrewsbury Town and Carlisle United to avoid the drop to the Conference. With fifteen minutes left in the season, Chester were above both Shrewsbury and Carlisle, but conceded a late goal against Peterborough United that was enough to see them relegated from the Football League on goal difference.

Atkins left, and fan favorite Graham Barrow returned as manager. He rebuilt the team, and in the 2000–01 season, his side managed a respectable ninth place, reached the third round of the FA Cup for the second successive season (in a controversial loss to Blackburn Rovers), made it to the semi-finals of the FA Trophy, and won the Conference League Cup, the first silverware for the club in over 70 years. During the season, Smith served as Barrow's scout and set-piece strategist for all Cup opponents, travelling on his own to scout opponents at least once or twice before Chester played them. In this scouting role, Smith utilized his American football background, where every American Football play is planned and choreographed from a set position in intricate detail, to focus on the development of creative set pieces, both corners and free kicks, for all the Cup matches that were based upon the weaknesses he perceived in the opponents' defensive alignment.

In addition, Barrow approached Smith at the start of the season, and asked him to watch the first half of every Chester match from up in the stands as a scout would, and then report what he saw to Barrow at halftime while Barrow was walking from the pitch to the dressing room. This good working relationship between them continued throughout the season.

In spite of this success, ahead of the 2001–02 season, Smith appointed Gordon Hill, an ex-Manchester United and ex-England player who was a personal friend, to become the new manager. Chester made a dreadful start to the season under Hill, winning only one of their first twelve matches. Smith finally sold his interest in the club to Stephen Vaughan and left at the start of October 2001, with the club completely out of debt other than what it owed him.

In 2003, a British court ordered Chester City to repay £300,000 in unpaid loans to Smith and his family. However, Smith still wanted to help the club, and so he accepted a settlement of far less than half that amount.

In 2004, Chester City FC finished first in their division, and was promoted again into the English League Third Division, thereby at that time fully completing the financial and on-field renovation of the club that had begun when Smith first purchased the club in an effort to rescue it from being closed down in 1999.

Apple Magazine wrote in its April 23, 2021 edition that Ted Lasso "was actually inspired by the story of Terry Smith, an American gridiron football coach who took over the English association football team Chester City F.C. and subsequently installed himself as the first-team coach".

When Terry Smith was coaching the English soccer team in 1999 through 2001, the three co-creators of the Ted Lasso series, Jason Sudeikis, Brendan Hunt, and Joe Kelly were living and working at Boom Chicago, a well-known comedy theater in Amsterdam at this same time from 1999-2001. Amsterdam is just a short distance across the English Channel from England.

Sudeikis and Hunt have said in interviews that during their years in Amsterdam they were huge fans of English soccer, that they read about English soccer all the time and watched English soccer on the BBC television channels in Amsterdam, and that they would often travel the short distance by ferry across the channel to attend and watch English soccer matches.

The writers and actors of the Ted Lasso series often spoke about Terry Smith before the series began and in the early years of the season. For example, in an interview for AppleTV in August 2020, Brendan Hunt, the co-creator of Ted Lasso, and actor who portrays assistant manager Coach Beard in the Ted Lasso series, is asked by the interviewer what Ted Lasso would say to the England National Team to motivate them to win the World Cup. Hunt answered the interviewer with the following quote, “I think he would do what Terry Smith did for Chester City back in the day. He would drape himself in the American flag and he would emphasize the American Dream, because that’s what I think English people love the most.”

Hunt’s response in the AppleTV and UK Movies interview is referencing a soccer magazine article from September 1999 that was written about Terry Smith emphasizing the American Dream in a positive way. This article included a cover photo of Smith wrapped in an American flag. This 21-year-old magazine article was published in England in September 1999, when Smith was being the first American to ever manage and coach a professional English soccer team.

This magazine Hunt is referring to is not available online and so Brendan Hunt, one of the co-creators of Ted Lasso who plays the assistant manager Coach Beard, will have gotten the hard copy of this 1999 article about Smith in 1999 when Smith was coaching soccer in England and Hunt was working at the Boom Chicago comedy club in Amsterdam. Which proves that Hunt knew about Smith when Hunt and Sudeikis began the idea for the Ted Lasso character in Amsterdam in 1999 while Smith was coaching soccer in England, and proves that Smith was the inspiration for the Ted Lasso character and the Ted Lasso series. Hunt and Sudeikis also often discuss how much they played the FIFA soccer video game when they were in Amsterdam, and because Smith was a manager in the English Football League, then Smith was a coach in the video game that Hunt and Sudeikis would play.

This answer by Hunt, where he says that Ted Lasso would motivate the England National Team by doing what Terry Smith did to motivate his English team, is also very revealing in itself because the interviewer did not mention Smith in the question, and so Hunt’s answer shows that when he was asked a question about how Ted Lasso would motivate people then Hunt answered with a fact about what Terry Smith did to motivate people. This shows that Hunt mentally associates Smith and Smith’s motivating actions with Ted Lasso and with what Ted Lasso would do, because the question Hunt was asked was about how Ted Lasso would motivate the England Team players.

BELIEVE Quote by Terry Smith in August 1999 London Guardian as Smith became the first American to coach an English soccer club, just like Ted Lasso, A week after this quote, Smith and his team defeated a Division 1 team in a Major Cup to face Arsenal

Hunt’s answer also shows that he knows a huge amount about Smith in order to choose to refer to Smith off the top of his head in an interview answer for a question that was about Ted Lasso. Hunt’s answer also shows that Hunt thinks Smith is a person who motivates other people like Ted Lasso does, and shows that Hunt thinks Smith emphasizes, motivates with and believes in the American Dream. Most revealing, Hunt was referring to what Smith did 21 years earlier in a 21 year-old magazine article whose magazine is not available anywhere online. And so for Hunt to know about that old article, then he and his other writers would have had to research back 21 years to find a hard copy of the magazine. This shows that by Hunt knowing about a hard copy magazine article written about Smith from 21 years earlier, then Hunt is displaying what appears to be the huge amount of research that he and his co-creators had done on Smith before they began writing the Ted Lasso show.

Terry Smith wrote this BELIEVE message on August 22, 1999, just like Ted Lasso did, in the motivational journal Smith authored in 1999, right after his first practice as the Manager of an English soccer club, Smith wrote BELIEVE for 300 straight Days

Regarding Smith and Lasso’s Believe Philosophy, within days of taking over the team, Smith said in the Guardian national newspaper printed in London in August 1999, “Getting to the First Division in three years is not a promise, it’s a goal. There’s not much difference between being a Third and a First Division team. In every area of Life you pretty much become what you BELIEVE you can become. And if I have to stand up and say we’ll be in the First Division in three years and get people to BELIEVE that, then to me that’s what has to be done.”

Likewise, the Ted Lasso series is built around this same Believe Philosophy that Lasso put on the dressing room wall in the first episode of the series, just like Smith spoke about his Believe Philosophy in this Guardian article during the first days of his ownership and coaching of the team.

Smith also prepared a scouting report and a game plan for every match he coached, with every scouting report and game plan being an average of seven pages long. On the cover of every match scouting report

and on the cover of every game plan Smith wrote the word BELIEVE.

A Quote written by Terry Smith in his 1998 motivational book The Hero Inside Of You about his BELIEVE Philosophy, written by Smith and published in Europe the year before he became the first American to ever coach a professional soccer team in England

Smith gave a copy of every scouting report and every game plan he wrote to each of his players before every game in the dressing room, all with the word BELIEVE in large letters on the cover page, and all with the word BELIEVE as the last word on the final page of each scouting report and game plan.

He was known to put up positive statements and messages for his players to build their confidence and Belief in themselves.

Terry Smith early in his football coaching career at Lees-McRae College.

Smith became well-known for his emphasis and his creativity on set pieces like corners and free kicks. Because of his American football coaching background, and because every American football play is a set piece, then Smith’s coaching background allowed him to be creative and skilled at designing set pieces.

Likewise, Ted Lasso had several episodes where Lasso emphasized and designed creative set pieces.

Smith often said that his disadvantage as an American football coach competing in soccer against the experienced and very skilled English soccer coaches had a hidden advantage with set pieces, and so Smith had found a way to turn the disadvantage of being an American football coach into an advantage.

Ted Lasso also said these exact same things that Smith said in the final episodes of Season 1 about how being an American football coach gave him an advantage on set pieces, and allowed Lasso to turn a disadvantage into an advantage.

Seven months before taking over Chester, Smith wrote a motivational book that was published and sold throughout Europe, that he titled, “The Hero Inside Of You”, and in his book he wrote about his Believe Philosophy.

Newspaper reporters in 1999 often referred to Smith’s book and his completely positive personality, such as in the Chester Chronicle newspaper following Smith’s first game as manager, a Worthington Cup match, when Smith’s team scored 4 goals to defeat Port Vale, a club that was in the First Division, two divisions higher than Smith’s team.

The Chester Chronicle article wrote that Smith is always completely positive, never has a negative word or thought, and that he motivates his players with the same methods and enthusiasm that he wrote in his book, "The Hero Inside Of You."

Terry Smith, five-time National Championship and European Championship-winning player and head coach, and Great Britain National Team head coach, writes the Player Welcome in the National Championship Program.

Smith was a huge supporter of women's soccer in England, as shown by how his Chester team had one of the first women's professional teams in England and Great Britain that played its home matches and Cup tournaments at Smith's stadium. Smith was also such a champion for women's soccer that he allowed the England Women's Football Associations and the Women's Premier League to play their biggest Cup matches at Smith's stadium for free so that Smith would know that all the revenue and all the gate receipts would be profit for the women's teams playing in the Cups and for the Women's Football Association. For example, the 2000-2001 FA Women's Premier League Cup Final was played at Smith's stadium in April 2001 where the Arsenal women defeated the Tranmere Rovers women 3-1 in the Premier League Cup Final.

In October 2024, Smith again showed that he was a champion for women's sports when he became the president of the Women's Football Alliance in the United States, a nationwide League of more than 60 teams that plays in three Divisions across the United States and plays its National Championships at the NFL Hall of Fame Stadium in Canton, Ohio, in games that are broadcast on ESPN. As a result, Smith is one of the few people in the world who has been a champion for two women's sports and for women's sports on both sides of the Atlantic.

Smith cared so much about his WFA women players and their futures, that the first thing Smith did as president was create a $1.4 Million partnership with edX, the online education platform.

Smith arranged this partnership so that all 3,000 women football players in the WFA could take for free any of the thousands of college and university courses offered by edX from the top universities around the world so that all the WFA players could gain degrees and certificates for free that would benefit them personally and in their future careers beyond playing football.

Working with edX, Smith also created five unique course pathways that are designed specifically for the WFA players, which include Women in Leadership, Entrepreneurship, Personal Finance, Public Speaking, and NIL Branding, because these are the five key core areas that the WFA players will most benefit from in their personal development and in their current and future careers.

Terry Smith wrote this Thank You Page to his Readers at the end of his motivational book, The Hero Inside Of You, to Thank his Readers for spending the year with him, his book was published in England and Europe in 1998 and 1999

Working with commissioner Lisa King, Smith also did work to initiate the WFA's expansion into Canada, the creation and development of WFA Properties and WFA Films, and the creation of the WFA Flag National Pro Tour, which is a nationwide and international Flag Football competition.

In 2025-2026, Smith also negotiated and created the Women’s Football Alliance league headquarters at the Pro Football Hall of Fame Stadium in Canton, Ohio, designing a 10,000 square foot league office and WFA retail store that overlooks the end zone of the iconic Pro Football Hall of Fame Stadium where the NFL players are enshrined every year in the Pro Football Hall of Fame.

Because of his love for the women of the WFA, Smith took on this cost personally on his own. In the media announcement, Smith said, "The reason I was so motivated to create this for the Women's Football Alliance is because the women who make up our WFA are some of the finest, kindest, most humble, and most amazing women in the world," WFA President Terry Smith said, “And so, it's an honor for me to be able to help our fantastic women in any way possible."

In March 2025, Smith purchased the Brantford Red Sox, a 115-year-old professional baseball team in Ontario Canada's Canadian Baseball League that has won a record 15 League Championships, but has been struggling in last place and near financial closure for the past several years.

With six home games remaining in the 2025 season, the Red Sox were on a ten-game losing streak and had a home

Women's Football Alliance league president Terry Smith works to prepare the field for the 2025 Pro Division WFA National Championship Game played at the WFA's League Headquarters at The Pro Football Hall of Fame Stadium in Canton, Ohio

record for the entire season of one win and fourteen losses, with a thirteen-game home losing streak. It was at this point that Smith took over as the team's manager/head coach, and his Red Sox team responded by going undefeated and winning all six of its remaining home games with Smith as manager, the longest home winning streak the Red Sox team has had since 2004.

During the 2026 season, Smith was chosen as a coach for the 2026 Canadian Baseball League All-Star Game, and Smith coached in the All-Star Game in July 2026.

== Personal life ==
Terry Smith is interviewed by Channel 5 television as he comes home to give back to the Avery County families he grew up with as Avery High School's new head football coach and head baseball coach, going on to achieve the highest winning percentage of any football coach and any baseball coach in school history

Smith purchased the Mountain Television Network in 2008 for only a $10,000 deposit because the television station and network was ready to be closed down and go off the air. Smith transformed the station and network by producing one hundred hours each week of their own new television programming, the most of any television station in America, and as written on the page titled WLNN-CD, by expanding the station and network from being broadcast on only one cable network in only two counties of one state, to being on sixteen cable networks that broadcast to millions of viewers across six states in the entire Southeast of the U.S.

Smith's overriding rule in providing this all-inclusive coverage was that MTN and all of its staff were only allowed to broadcast positive television shows and positive news stories and coverage. Unlike all other television stations across the country that usually focus on only negative news stories, Smith focused MTN entirely on everything positive and great that was happening in America.

Smith implemented his only positive network rules so that even the MTN news broadcasts were only allowed to cover positive news stories. Smith even created a special "What A Wonderful World" news segment on the MTN Evening News every night, where an especially positive news story was told and shown footage of while the musical background of the story had Louis Armstrong singing his song, "What A Wonderful World". Smith implemented this station rule allowing only positive news stories and positive television programs because of his philosophy that "You create your World by what you think about", and so he wanted his television station and all the station's viewers to create and live in a positive and uplifting environment.

Head Coach Terry Smith and his Great Britain National Team defeat the German National Team 38 - 8 in The European Championship Semi-Final at 57,000-Seat Volksparkstadion in Hamburg, Germany. German headline reads that Smith won with Beautiful Tactics

In order to achieve its mission of emphasizing good news stories in the region as well as the country as a whole, MTN ensured that its own programs were broadcast 24 hours every day.

MTN filmed and broadcast an average of ten high school and college sports games every week year-round, utilizing three production teams.

The MTN Games of the Week were announced by Len Murphy on play-by-play with Terry Smith as the color analyst. Murphy and Smith formed a partnership for many years, and they became synonymous with North Carolina and Tennessee's most-watched sports broadcasts.

Smith's Mountain Television Network produced, filmed, directed, hosted, and broadcast more than 100 hours each week of its own programming, including the Appalachian State football and basketball games announced by Murphy and Smith, other college games from around the region and more than 500 high school games from all sports, including football, basketball, soccer, baseball, softball, volleyball, and lacrosse announced by Murphy and Smith, the End Zone Football Friday Night Highlight Show hosted by Smith, the Appalachian State Football's ASU Chalktalk Strategy Show hosted by Smith and ASU Hall of Fame Quarterback Steve Brown, nightly newscasts with a complete news team, morning newscasts with a news team, a Noon show and newscasts, a three-hour live morning show with many guests, a weekly sports highlight show with coverage of the High Country Heisman candidates, Chamber of Commerce Shows from several different counties, several Education Shows hosted by school superintendents, university shows hosted by their chancellors, a weekly Appalachian State sports highlight show, several Arts Shows hosted by the Arts Councils, a two-hour daily live sports call-in show, live broadcasts of political elections, interviews hosted by Terry Smith with all the political candidates from each party running for office during each election cycle, regular political interviews hosted by Terry Smith with all the state and national in-office congresspeople, a weekly senior citizen of the week interview that Smith hosted to highlight and show his respect for our senior citizens, and the weekly Veterans' Voice two-hour television show that interviewed and told the life stories of more than 150 World War II veterans, as well as Korean War veterans, Vietnam War veterans, and Gulf War veterans, hosted by Terry Smith and World War II Veteran and Hero Ken Wiley.

As a result, as per the WLNN-CD webpage, MTN produced more hours of its own television content during these years than any other television station in the United States.

For eight years, Smith created and hosted The Veteran's Voice television show, which featured interviews with U.S. military veterans. Smith hosted these shows with WW II veteran and author Ken Wiley, a World War II veteran of seven D-Day battles in the Pacific where he drove the LCVP landing boats right up onto the D-Day beaches, and Smith also hosted these shows with World War II veterans HC Moretz, Norman Isenhour, and Sam Wotherspoon, and World War II historian Keith Buchanan, to film and broadcast more than 300 two-hour life story interviews with World War II, Korean War, Vietnam War, and Gulf War military veterans.

Smith created and hosted more than 300 Veterans' Voice television programs documenting the experiences of American military veterans. He also provided DVD copies of every interview to every veteran's family member, including sons, daughters, wives, husbands, grandchildren, great-grandchildren, brothers and sisters, so that every family member would forever have a DVD copy of the veteran who they loved life's story interview.

A collection of these television shows and DVDs are archived at libraries and war museums in Washington DC and across the United States, including in the Watauga County Library.

Smith worked with Wiley to organize two World War II symposiums, one at Appalachian State University in 2012 and another at Watauga High School in 2013, because Smith wanted to recognize and show our country's complete respect for our World War II veterans. Every World War II veteran from throughout the region was honored at the symposiums by being introduced onto the stage by Smith, with each veteran's World War II heroic stories and experiences being told by Smith, and by each veteran having his or her own personal table to meet, talk with, and take photographs with symposium attendees. Terry Smith, WWII veteran Ken Wiley, WWII veteran HC Moretz, and Moretz's daughter Dorian Moretz of Boone, NC, also worked together to bring World War II history to schools throughout North Carolina and Tennessee, during which Wiley and Moretz spoke in school assemblies and classrooms, providing first-person knowledge of World War II history to students throughout the region. Smith also filmed, produced, and directed national television programs such as the "Southern Fresh" cooking show. "Southern Fresh" was broadcast on MTN throughout the Southeast, and was also broadcast on several national cable television networks such as RFD-TV that allowed the show directed by Smith to reach more than 100 million potential viewers every week.

Smith's MTN also filmed an outdoor stage production of the world-famous "Horn In The West" outdoor drama that is historically based on the Overmountain Men of the American Revolutionary War and on Daniel Boone. "Horn In The West" has been performed in Boone, North Carolina since 1952. From the outdoor stage production, Terry Smith filmed, produced, and directed the "Horn In The West" movie and DVD that was distributed to a nationwide audience. Because of how patriotic that Smith is, he wanted to make a movie to tell the patriotic story of the Overmountain Men during the American Revolutionary War, who lived in the North Carolina and Tennessee mountain areas and marched across the Appalachian Mountains to fight and win a battle against the British army at King's Mountain, North Carolina that Thomas Jefferson, the writer of the Declaration of Independence and soon-to-be President, thought was such a positive and important turning point of the Revolutionary War that he called it the "turn of the tide of success" in the entire war.

Terry Smith, Lees-McRae College professor and head of two departments, with his outstanding School of Business and Sport Management Students

Smith became a full-time professor at Lees-McRae College in North Carolina, teaching eight courses every semester in the School of Business and Management. He was promoted to become the Head of both the Sport Management Department and the Health and Fitness Department within the School of Business and Management. Smith was also promoted to become the Faculty Athletic Representative where he served in the President's cabinet and reported to Lees-McRae College President Barry Buxton.

Smith retired from being a professor to take care of his father for several months, and then when his father vastly improved, Smith became a Director for Elizabethton High School in Tennessee in 2017, where he took a program with 22 students and built it into all 900 students in the school in one school year. Under Smith's leadership, the Bartleby program and Elizabethton High School were selected as one of the 10 XQ Super Schools in the entire United States in 2018. Smith then wrote a grant document describing and outlining their innovative and pioneering program that included 50 new project-based and experiential-learning courses, freshman experience courses, public speaking and rhetoric courses, entrepreneurship classes where each student began a business in the community, community improvement classes where each student did work to make something nicer in the community, and senior capstones taught by college professors to prepare students for college and for careers. An educational program so comprehensive and valuable that every student who completed five courses in it received a college scholarship to any of ten regional colleges and universities that Smith created and signed college partnerships with. A grant document that resulted in their program and school receiving a $2.3 million grant from the XQ Foundation that Smith used to reward his teachers with bonuses for going through additional training and teaching the new project-based courses. Smith created and designed seven new rooms for the school, and so he also used the grant money to design and build the seven more rooms he had planned at the high school, including a speaker auditorium with two giant projector screens, a television studio, a technology maker space, a group work and study area, and an outdoor stage and theater.

Terry Smith is invited by Congress to Washington DC to speak with the U.S. Congress on Capitol Hill about his innovative and pioneering Top 10 in The United States High School and about how to improve The Future of Education in America.

With the success of Elizabethton High School, Smith was invited by the United States Congress, and by U.S. Congressman Phil Roe of Tennessee's First District, to come to Washington, D.C. for Smith to speak on Capitol Hill to the United States Congress about the innovative and very successful educational methods Smith had created at Elizabethton High School, and to have Smith speak with Congress about the Future of Education in America. Smith was one of only four public school educators in the entire United States to be honored with this invitation and achievement.

From 2022 through 2024, Smith became the president of the non-profit NFL Alumni Association for Washington DC, and during these years he did work for and raised money for a large number of homeless, financially and physically disadvantaged, children, and family charities and non-profits throughout Washington DC and nationwide, including for Toys For Tots and for Foster Children organizations.

In this role, working with DC Divas owner Rich Daniel, Smith initiated a partnership between the NFL Alumni Association and the Women's Football Alliance, a women's professional tackle football league, creating a close relationship that would recognize and honor women football players and women athletes by having the WFA women be honored as full playing members of the NFL Alumni Association.

In October 2024, Smith became the president of the Women's Football Alliance, a nationwide League of more than 60 teams that plays in three Divisions across the United States, and plays its National Championships at the NFL Hall of Fame Stadium in Canton, Ohio, in games broadcast on ESPN

One of the first things Smith did as president was create a $1.4 Million partnership with edX, the online education platform, to help women players and their futures.

Smith arranged this partnership so that all 3,000 women football players in the WFA could take for free any of the thousands of college and university courses offered by edX from the top universities around the world so that all the WFA players could gain degrees and certificates for free that would benefit them personally and in their future careers beyond playing football.

Working with edX, Smith also created five unique course pathways that are designed specifically for the WFA players, which include Women in Leadership, Entrepreneurship, Personal Finance, Public Speaking, and NIL Branding, because these are the five key core areas that the WFA players will most benefit from in their personal development and in their current and future careers.

Working with commissioner Lisa King, Smith also did work to initiate the WFA's expansion into Canada, the creation and development of WFA Properties and WFA Films, and the creation of the WFA Flag National Pro Tour, which is a nationwide and international Flag Football competition. In 2025-2026, Smith also negotiated and created the Women’s Football Alliance league headquarters at the Pro Football Hall of Fame Stadium in Canton, Ohio, designing a 10,000 square foot league office and WFA retail store that overlooks the end zone of the iconic Pro Football Hall of Fame Stadium where the NFL players are enshrined every year in the Pro Football Hall of Fame.

Because of his love for the women of the WFA, Smith took on this cost personally on his own. In the media announcement, Smith said, "The reason I was so motivated to create this for the Women's Football Alliance is because the women who make up our WFA are some of the finest, kindest, most humble, and most amazing women in the world," WFA President Terry Smith said, “And so, it's an honor for me to be able to help our fantastic women in any way possible."

In March 2025, Smith purchased the Brantford Red Sox, a legendary 115-year-old professional baseball team in Ontario Canada's Intercounty Baseball League that has won a record 15 League Championships, but has been struggling in last place and near financial closure for the past several years. With six home games remaining in the 2025 season, the Red Sox were on a ten-game losing streak and had a home record for the entire season of one win and fourteen losses, with a thirteen-game home losing streak. It was at this point that Smith took over as the team's manager/head coach, and his Red Sox team responded by going undefeated and winning all six of its remaining home games with Smith as manager, the longest home winning streak the Red Sox team has had since 2004.

During the 2026 season, Smith was chosen as a coach for the 2026 Canadian Baseball League All-Star Game, and Smith coached in the All-Star Game in July 2026.

Terry Smith wrote this poem on the last page of his Motivational Book, THE HERO INSIDE OF YOU, to Encourage his Readers to always stay positive no matter what is facing you, and to always hold onto Your Eternal Belief that nothing can stop you from achieving your Chosen Destiny

Terry Smith wrote this back cover of his motivational book, THE HERO INSIDE OF YOU, published in England in 1998 after he had won five National and European Championships, before becoming the first American to ever coach a pro English soccer club

Terry Smith hosts the 140th Episode of The End Zone Football Show, marking the 750th sports broadcast he has hosted on The Mountain Television Network
