= List of American football teams in the Netherlands =

This is a list of American football teams in the Netherlands.

== AFBN Premier League (Eredivisie) ==
2021/2022 season lineup

- Amsterdam Crusaders
- Amsterdam Panthers
- Arnhem Falcons
- Groningen Giants
- 010 Trojans
- Flevo Phantoms
- Lelystad Commanders
- Hilversum Hurricanes

== AFBN First Division (Eerste divisie) ==
- Alphen Eagles
- Eindhoven Raptors
- Den Haag Raiders
- Spijkenisse Scouts
- Maastricht Wildcats
- Nijmegen Pirates
- Tilburg Wolves
- Utrecht Dominators
- Leiden Lightning
- West Frisian Outlawz

=== Combination Teams ===
- Krakens (Raptors + Wolves + Scouts)
- Parrots (Eagles + Pirates)

== QFL (Queens Football League) ==
2021/2022 season lineup

- Amsterdam Cats
- Rotterdam Ravens
- Almere Foxes
- 0’30 Wolverines
- The Hague Black Scorpions
- Zwolle Blue Jays
- Eindhoven Valkyries

== No Senior Tackle Team ==
- Amersfoort Untouchables
- Purmerend Barbarians
- CSB Eagles

== Defunct ==
=== NFL Europe ===
- Amsterdam Admirals

=== AFBN ===
- Delft Dragons

== See also ==
- American Football in the Netherlands
- List of American football teams in Belgium
