= Delft Dragons =

Dutch American football team

- Founded: 1984- reestablished in 2000
- Based in: Delft, Netherlands
- Home stadium: Sportcentrum Delft (2002–2007); None (2007)
- League: AFBN Division One (2005–2007); AFBN Division Two (2002–2004), (2008–2010)
- Colors: Orange and black
- Nickname: Dragons

Personnel
- Head coach: Dick van Hirtum (Senior); Cees Meuleman (Youth); Richard Langkemper (Flag)
- General manager: Rienk Bijlsma

Delft Dragons are an American football team based in Delft, Netherlands.

== History ==
- Foundations

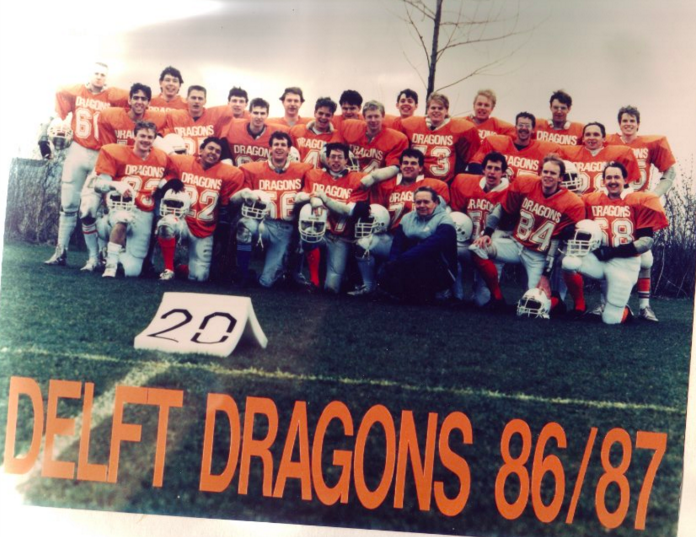
1986-87 team line-up

Sometime in 1981 the Chairman of the Amsterdam Rams (the only Dutch American Football team at the time), Rene Koningferander, appeared in the TV program "Sprekershoek" and called for the creation of an American Football league in the Netherlands. The Rams' players supported new teams as needed by organizing training and games. The first teams created were the Hague Raiders, Amsterdam Crusaders and the Delft Dragons. A first tournament was organized between the four teams a year later and this was televised by Veronica, championed by Veronica's Bob de Jong. Its first chairman was Gabriel de Scheemaker, and its first quarterback Richard Rietveld, who at the time also worked with Veronica Sport as commentator. The Delft Dragons joined the Netherlands American Football Federation (NAFF), chaired by Guus Annokkee. The team was supported by the Technical University Delft and used the university's facilities. "Civil" members soon joined from many directions. The Delft Dragons University Team was active between 1984 and 1993 but it folded due to lack of players.

- Flag football

Towards the end of 1999, influenced by the television coverage on FOX8, a number of students decided to found an American Football team in Delft, Netherlands. The new founders decided that they would try to harness any remaining familiarity by calling the new team by the same name as Delft's former team. From the end of January 2000 they were in training under American Head Coach David Caraway and assistant Widjai van Dam, as a flag football team. The Dragons had a good debut season, finishing 5th of the 10 participating teams.

- Full contact football

With Coach Caraway returned to his home in Texas, it was up to new Head Coach Widjai van Dam to lead the 2001 preparations for full-contact football. The Dragons added several players to their squad and were joined by defensive co-ordinator Steve Sheppard.

The Delft Dragons played their first competitive games in November 2001 in a tournament qualifier. The Dragons defeated Assen Bulldogs and Amstelland Panthers and were a surprise qualifier for the finals. The finals produced more shocks. The Dragons defeated the Amsterdam Crusaders in the semi-final, and narrowly lost the final to the 2001 Div.2 finalists Tilburg Steelers in two periods of overtime.

- 2002: First AFBN season

With impressive results in mind, Delft were offered a place in AFBN Division Two for the 2002 season, bypassing Division Three. Despite very good performances and very close results, Delft were unable to post a win and recorded a regular season record of 0 wins and 6 losses, but the signs were there that the Dragons would not be a flash in the pan.

- 2003: Playoffs

Under newly appointed Head Coach Steve Sheppard, the Dragons again started badly with an 0–2–1 record. However, an upturn in fortunes and confidence saw Delft rally to a 3–3–1 regular season record and obtained a playoff spot, losing 30–0 to Hoorn Unicorns in the Division Two semi-final.

- 2004: Championship and promotion

Delft, strengthened by the acquisition of former Utah Utes coach Sean McNabb, went on to post a 5–2 regular season record. The play-off semi-final brought revenge as Delft defeated Hoorn and a tense victory over Amstelland Panthers in the Bowl game brought the Division Two Championship and 1st Division status to Delft.

- 2005: National playoffs

The Dragons, in their first top flight appearance since their rebirth, had lost coach Sean McNabb and a lot of starting players, and were hoping to post a record worthy of remaining in the 1st Division. Nevertheless, a hint of what may be possible was seen with the 53–13 destruction of Rotterdam Trojans in the pre-season Liberty Bowl championship. The Dragons went on to achieve a 6–4 regular season record, eventually losing in the national semi-final to eventual champions Amsterdam Crusaders.

- 2006: Heartbreaker

Widjai van Dam resumed his former role as Head Coach and oversaw an incredible turn of events in Delft. First, the Dragons began the season with a depleted squad by losing their first three games. Then the Dragons improved to 5 straight wins and into the playoffs. In the semi-final the overwhelming favourite Maastricht Wildcats were shocked 15–13 and van Dam had led a Delft team further than anyone before him—to Tulip Bowl XXII. Their opponents were the undefeated Amsterdam Crusaders—a team attempting to win the national title for the 13th time, and the 5th time in a row. The Dragons did not disappoint and led for much of the game. But the Crusaders snatched the national championship away from their fingertips in overtime: 27–20. This Dragons team featured several key players from the University of Guelph Gryphons football program in Canada. These players were LB Andrew Oosterhuis, RB Drew Davenport, and QB Matt Bryans.

- 2007: Rebuilding

The first youth players graduated to the senior team, but Delft lost a lot of veteran players. The departure of Head Coach Widjai van Dam and Offensive Co-ordinator Rool Paap saw the appointment of Dick van Hirtum as senior head coach. The Dragons, with a small squad, lost all their regular season games and were relegated to American Football Bond Nederland Division Two.

The youth teams had a good year ending in the playoffs with two losses for flag and one loss for the tackle team.

- 2008

Delft went winless in their first Division Two season since 2004.

- 2009, 2010

Dick van Hirtum resigned as Head Coach after he did not meet the goals he set. Theo Westgeest took over as player/Head Coach. The Dragons played in the 2009/2010 flag football season, but the lack of new players forced the team to quit operations in the summer of 2010. Some players went on to play football and can be found at Lightning Leiden.

== Other honours ==
- Liberty Bowl titles: 1
  - 2004

== Notable former members ==
(United States)	Sean McNabb (Defensive Co-ordinator, 2004):	RB Coach and ST Co-ordinator for University of Utah. Also worked as coach for Dallas Cowboys and San Diego Chargers of the NFL before joining Delft.

(United Kingdom) Steve Sheppard (Head Coach)

(Netherlands) Widjai van Dam (Head Coach)

(Canada) (Quebec) Dominic LaFerriere (Quarterback)

Andrew Oosterhuis- University of Guelph LB. Canada.

(Morocco) Moncief Ghazza (Running Back)

(Netherlands) Jeroen Zomer (Defensive End)

(Netherlands) Rool Paap (Center)

(Netherlands) Danny van Scheppingen (Offensive lineman)

(Netherlands) Dick Van Hirtum (Offensive lineman)

(Netherlands) Rienk Bijlsma (Quarterback / Defensive Back)

(Netherlands) Michiel Bolhuis (Defensive Back)

(United States) Jerrold Icban (Linebacker / Defensive Tackle)

(United States) Larry Lopes (Defensive Tackle)

== See also ==
- List of American football teams in the Netherlands
- American Football Bond Nederland
