= Enschede Broncos =

American football club in Enschede, the Netherlands

General information
- Founded: 1985
- Stadium: Wethouder Horstman Sportpark
- Headquartered: Enschede

Personnel
- General manager: Camilio Delfgaauw
- Head coach: Dennis van Beek

League / conference affiliations
- AFBN Eerste Divisie B 1st Division

Current uniform

Enschede Broncos is an American football club from Enschede, the Netherlands.

== History ==
=== Enschede Warriors ===
Founded in 1985 by Marc Kuizenga and some other enthusiasts, the Warriors started playing in the Dutch 2nd league. The Warriors are the only good organised team Enschede had in years. After beating the Lelystad Lizards in the friendship bowl and the Zaandam Giants in the Runners-up Bowl the Enschede Warriors had the opportunity to play in the highest Dutch league. Most players didn't or couldn't play at such level and the warriors chose to stay in the 2nd league. Many players went to play for other team in the next season. Frank Versteeg (RB, The Hague Raiders), Job Posthumus (OL, Amsterdam Crusaders) and Onno Hinrichs (LB, Utrecht Vikings) went playing in the Dutch highest league. The Warriors stopped in 1993 because of mismanagement and a lack of players.

During active years the Enschede Warriors were being coached by several coaches as Robert Poindexter. Under Coach Poindexter the Warriors had an undefeated season in 1988.

=== Enschede Broncos ===
In 2003 a new team was founded in Enschede, the Enschede Broncos. They started playing their first season of competitive matches in 2011.

In 2012, the Broncos acquired their own home field, including goalposts. Their home field is part of the sports complex Wethouder Horstman Sportpark in Enschede, which is shared with a rugby club and two soccer clubs.

On March 3, 2013, the Broncos celebrated their 10th anniversary. They played a home game against the Eindhoven Raptors, which they won. In that 2013 season, they went on to obtain a spot in the 3rd Division finals. They lost against the undefeated Rotterdam Trojans.

Two years later, in 2015, they reached the 1st Division finals under rookie HC Joeri Constandse. However, they lost, again, from an undefeated team; the Groningen Giants.

Due to a lack of players, the Broncos weren’t able to play the 2018 season.

In 2019 they made a comeback under head coach Dennis van Beek with a team full of rookies and some of the players from the old team.

== Current roster ==
Staff
Name	Function
Dennis van Beek	Head Coach / Defensive Coordinator
Tom Wolterink	Offensive Coordinator
Bennie van Limbeek	RB / DB Coach
Hendrik Schneider	Linemen Coach
Jaimy Tahapary	Team manager

Player
Name	Position
Alfred SImon	RB / LB
Bernd Lok	OL / DL
Bert Hoven	OL / DL
Bjorn Roozeboom	OL / DL
Bjorn ten Hoopen	OL / DL
Camilio Delfgaauw	OL / DL
Coen Hartjes	RB / WR
Daniek Nijboer	RB / LB
Elco Veldhof	OL / DL
Hilko Looten	OL / DL
Holger Huijsman	LB
Jason Dikken	RB / WR
Jesper Jeeninga	DB
Kristan Bouwman	RB / LB
Luise Warnke	DB
Marc Scoop	WR
Max Boerkamp	DL
Niek Kamphuis	OL / DL
Robin Heyt	DB
Samuel Sapulette	DB
Stefan Drenth	OL / DL
Sven Mollinga	LB / DB
Thomas Meurs	OL / DL
Tim de Haas	K / P
Tom Wolterink	QB
Vincent Smit	WR
Wilbert Poppink	DB / WR
Wouter Moes	OL / DL
Xavier Iyke	RB / DB
Luca Sehic	WR
