= Glenn Dennison =

American football player (born 1961)

No. 86, 89
- Position: Tight end

Personal information
- Born: November 17, 1961 (age 64); Beaver Falls, Pennsylvania, U.S.
- Listed height: 6 ft 3 in (1.91 m)
- Listed weight: 225 lb (102 kg)

Career information
- High school: Beaver Falls
- College: Miami (FL)
- NFL draft: 1984: 2nd round, 39th overall pick

Career history
- New York Jets (1984–1986); Washington Redskins (1987); New York Jets (1988); Amsterdam Crusaders (1989-1990)

Awards and highlights
- National champion (1983); Second-team All-American (1983); Miami Hurricanes Team MVP (1983); First-team All-South Independent (1982); Tulip Bowl National champion (1989,1990)

Career NFL statistics
- Receptions: 18
- Receiving yards: 149
- Touchdowns: 1
- Stats at Pro Football Reference

Glenn A. Dennison (born November 17, 1961) is an American former professional football player who was a tight end in the National Football League (NFL) for the New York Jets and the 1987 Super Bowl—winning Washington Redskins. In 1989, he played for the Amsterdam Crusaders in the Netherlands. He played college football for the Miami Hurricanes and was selected in the second round of the 1984 NFL draft.

== College career and statistics ==
Dennison was a three-year starter for the University of Miami. He established school single season and career receptions records. Team MVP for the National Champion 1983 Miami Hurricanes football team. Caught two TD passes in the 1984 National Championship game. He was named AP 2nd team All-American. Dennison was selected to play in the Shrine All Star Game and the Senior Bowl.

- 1981: 29 catches for 270 yards.
- 1982: 23 catches for 231 yards and 2 touchdowns.
- 1983: 54 catches for 594 yards and 3 touchdowns. 2 carries for 6 yards.

== Professional career ==
=== NFL ===
Dennison was selected in the second round of the 1984 NFL draft. As a rookie for the New York Jets in 1984, Dennison had 16 catches for 141 yards and one touchdown over nine starts. He is a Super Bowl champion as a member of the 1987 Washington Redskins. He returned to the Jets for the 1988 season.

=== Europe ===
In 1989, Dennison signed and played for the Amsterdam Crusaders helping the Crusaders to win the Dutch league Tulip Bowl championship in 1989 and 1990. He also helped the Crusaders reach the 1989 Eurobowl championship final, before losing 27–23 to the Legnano Frogs from Italy.
