= EFAF Euro Top 20 =

The EFAF Euro Top 20 is the official EFAF ranking system for American football club teams in Europe.

The list considers only those teams playing in an EFAF member country, and competing in one of the official EFAF international competitions (European Football League, EFAF Cup, EFAF Challenge Cup or EFAF Atlantic Cup).

The list is updated after every weekend of European competition, or at least every two weeks, during the EFAF competition period of April to July.

== EFAF Euro Top 20 ==
=== 2017 ===
Last ranking from May 25, 2017. In 2019 EFAF became part of IFAF Europe

1. (Germany) Braunschweig Lions
2. (Germany) Frankfurt Universe
3. (Germany) Berlin Rebels
4. (Netherlands) Amsterdam Crusaders
5. (Italy) Milano Seamen
6. (Spain) Badalona Dracs
7. (France) Thonon Black Panthers
8. (Italy) Rhinos Milano
9. (France) Dauphins de Nice
10. (Czech Republic) Prague Black Panthers
11. (Germany) Berlin Adler
12. (Germany) Schwäbisch Hall Unicorns
13. (Germany) Dresden Monarchs
14. (Austria) Swarco Raiders Tirol
15. (Austria) Vienna Vikings
16. (Sweden) Carlstad Crusaders
17. (Switzerland) Basel Gladiators
18. (Denmark) Copenhagen Towers
19. (Russia) Moscow Patriots
20. (Poland) Panthers Wrocław

=== 2013 ===
Accurate as of June 20, 2013.

1	(Austria)	Raiffeisen Vikings Vienna
2	(Austria)	Swarco Raiders Tirol
3	(Switzerland)	Calanda Broncos
4	(Germany)	Berlin Adler
5	(Germany)	Schwäbisch Hall Unicorns
6	(Austria)	Graz Giants
7	(Finland)	Helsinki Roosters
8	(Denmark)	Søllerød Gold Diggers
9	(Finland)	Helsinki Wolverines
10	(France)	Thonon Black Panthers
11	(Spain)	L'Hospitalet Pioners
12	(France)	Nice Dauphins
13	(Denmark)	Copenhagen Towers
14	(United Kingdom)	London Blitz
15	(Czech Republic)	Prague Panthers
16	(France)	Amiens Spartiates
17	(Spain)	Badalona Dracs
18	(Netherlands)	Alphen Eagles
19	(Belgium)	Brussels Tigers
20	(Northern Ireland)	Belfast Trojans
