= AFBN Eredivisie =

Division of American football in the Netherlands

The AFBN's Eredivisie (lit. "premier league") is the top division of American football in the Netherlands founded in 1983. The league currently consists of 8 teams from different cities of the Netherlands. At the end of each regular season, the top two teams from each "pool" play in the playoffs, a four-team single-elimination tournament that culminates with the championship game, known as the Tulip Bowl.

== 2024 season lineup ==
Pool	Team	City	Founded
A	Arnhem Falcons	Arnhem	1989
A	Groningen Giants	Groningen	2000
B	Flevo Phantoms	Almere	1985
B	Maastricht Wildcats	Almere	

== Promotion/Relegation ==
At the end of the regular season, the worst-performing team from this division will play a match against the best-performing team from "First division". The winner of that match will play in Eredivise next season; the loser will play in Erste divisie.
