= Paul Troth =

Paul Troth may refer to:

- Paul Troth (quarterback) (born 1982), American college football quarterback
- Paul Troth (American football coach) (born c. 1962), American football coach
