= Graciela Lara =

Mexican actress of film and television

- Occupation: Actress
- Years active: 1959–2000

Graciela Lara is a Mexican actress of film and television known for her debut in the 1959 film, Santa Claus.

== Filmography ==
- The Life of Agustín Lara (1959)
- Santa Claus (1959)
- La Valentina (1966)
- Santo vs. los villanos del ring (1966)
- Pedro Páramo (1967)
- The Bricklayer (1975)
- No Temas al Amor (1980, television series)
