= Stephen Hutchinson =

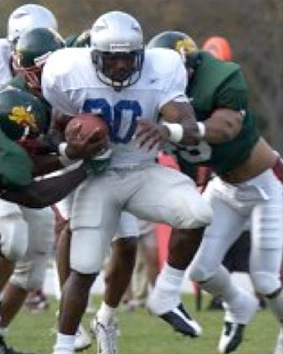

No. 30
- Position: Running back

Personal information
- Born: London, England
- Listed height: 5 ft 11 in (1.80 m)
- Listed weight: 220 lb (100 kg)

Career history
- London Gators (1990–1992); London Rockets (1993); London Olympians (1994–1999); London Monarchs (1995–1996); Hamburg Blue Devils (2000); Scottish Claymores (2001–2003); London Blitz (2007–2008)

Awards and highlights
- Euro Bowl Champion MVP 1994; Euro Cup Champion Team - MVP 1999; Brit Bowl Champion MVP 1994, 1996, 1997, 1998, 1999, 2000 & 2007; British & European Champions 1994 & 1999; BAFA Hall Of Fame, Class of 2021

Stephen Hutchinson is a former professional English American football running back for the London Monarchs and the Scottish Claymores during the NFL Europe era. Hutchinson played seven seasons from 1990 to 1999 in the British American Football League BAFL. He played for the London Gators, Rockets and London Olympians helping the Olympions win the 1994 Eurobowl championship. Hutchinson was named the game MVP.

Hutchinson signed a contract in 1995 with the London Monarchs in the World League of American Football WLAF later to be known as NFL Europe. Hutchinson also played professionally in 2000 in the German Football League with the Hamburg Blue Devils before returning to NFL Europe until he retired in 2003.

Hutchinson made a comeback back to the BAFL in 2007 and 2008 to the London Blitz as a player/coach, coaching the RB's, and Special Teams. Hutchinson helped the team on and off the field to win the Brit Bowl championship that year.

== Career ==
- London Gators BAFL (1990-1992)
- London Rockets BAFL (1993)
- London Olympians BAFL (1994-1999)
- London Monarchs WLAF (1995-1996)
- Hamburg Blue Devils GFL (2000)
- Scottish Claymores NFL Europe (2001-2003)
- London Blitz BAFL (2007-2008)
- London Olympians BAFL (2017-2019) RB Coach & Assistant OC
- BAFA Hall Of Fame Inaugural Induction (Class of 2021)

In August 2014 he co-founded and launched Rosterbase.com with Hal Saleh. Rosterbase.com is a virtual sports community that enables sports enthusiasts to interact via video conferencing, chat rooms and social networking. The platform allows Live Chat between sports fans, players, coaches, GMs and agents, discuss the latest game news. Share video and create highlight reels.

Stephen Hutchinson Kick Return For The London Monarchs
