= Football League of Europe =

Defunct American football league

The Football League of Europe (FLE) was a European American football league. It was founded in 1994, renamed 1995 in American Football League of Europe (AFLE) and dissolved after the 1995 season because of the ongoing financial problems. The trophy given annually to the FLE champions was the Jim Thorpe Trophy.

== History ==
The league was founded in 1994 under the leadership of the German team Hamburg Blue Devils. The Blue Devils left the league after the 1994 FLE season going back to the well established German Football League for the 1995 season. After the 1994 season, three other teams also left the league. The league folded following the 1995 season.

=== 1994 season ===
Eight teams from five countries competed during the first season in 1994.

North Conference

- Berlin Bears
- Hamburg Blue Devils
- Helsinki Roosters
- Stockholm Nordic Vikings

Central Conference

- Amsterdam Crusaders
- Frankfurt Gamblers
- Great Britain Spartans
- Munich Thunder

Teams were allowed to have up to 10 American players per roster, activating eight for each game. The Stockholm Nordic Vikings, for example, had seven Americans who earned $1,000 a month and expenses paid– the only players on the team who were paid.

Notable players include Great Britain Spartans running back Victor Ebubedike and Munich Thunder quarterback Tony Rice. Nordic Vikings quarterback Tim Petersen lead the league in passing with 3,027 yards and 37 touchdowns.

The championship games was held in front of 18,000 spectators in Hamburg's Volksparkstadion. The Stockholm Nordic Vikings defeated the host Hamburg Blue Devils with 43:35.

=== 1995 season ===
With the move of the Hamburg Blue Devils back into the German Football League after the 1994 season the league had lost their flagship team. Three other teams left the league now named American Football League of Europe.

- Amsterdam Crusaders
- Bergamo Lions
- Frankfurt Knights
- Great Britain Spartans
- Stockholm Nordic Vikings

In the championship games the Stockholm Nordic Vikings beat the Bergamo Lions 14:0 to become 2 time champions.
