= Hugo Avendaño =

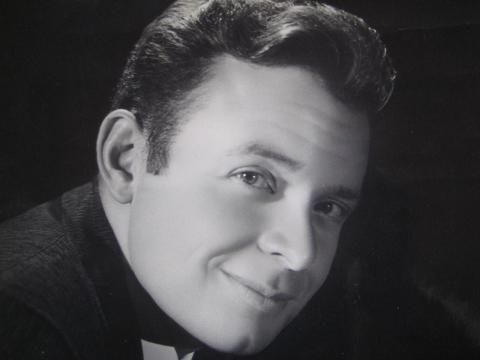
- Born: Hugo Avendaño Espinoza; 8 March 1927; Tuxpan, Veracruz, Mexico
- Died: 5 January 1998 (aged 70); Mexico City, D.F., Mexico
- Occupations: Singer, actor
- Years active: 1950–1998
- Spouse: Graziella Garza
- Children: 3
- Musical career
- Genres: Opera
- Instrument: Baritone
- Label: RCA Records

Hugo Avendaño Espinoza (8 March 1927 – 5 January 1998) was a Mexican singer and actor.

== Career ==
He was a student of the Faculty of Medicine, UNAM, but abandoned his intended career in medicine to study singing as a baritone. He began his studies at the Academy of Singing, where his teacher was Jose Pierson, whose other students included José Mojica, Alfonso Ortiz Tirado, Fanny Anitúa, Jorge Negrete, Pedro Vargas, Ramón Vinay, Francisco Avitia and José Sosa Esquivel. Later, he studied in New York at the Metropolitan Opera House with the baritone Leonard Warren among others.

In 1950 he debuted at the Palacio de Bellas Artes in Mexico, playing the role of Amonasro in Verdi's Aida. He participated in several opera seasons in Mexico City, Guadalajara, Monterrey and Veracruz. His repertoire included operas such as Rigoletto, Il trovatore, La traviata Pagliacci, Faust, Un ballo in maschera, Tosca, Carmen and Madama Butterfly, where he shared the stage with the soprano Betty Fabila. He also performed symphonic works by Darius Milhaud, Carmina Burana, and other works. He won the contest of the Gran Caruso and traveled to Brazil. He won an award for singing on the air at the Metropolitan Opera House.

Avendaño's romantic folk style and mastery of various musical genres led him to perform in Latin America, Central America, the United States and Europe, receiving several awards for his work.

From 1955 he began to work in the genre of romantic popular Mexican music, becoming known for performing the works of Agustín Lara and recording the album Mis favoritas de Lara for RCA Records. Also for RCA, he recorded folk songs by composers such as Manuel Ponce, Lorenzo Barcelata, Ignacio Fernández Esperón, Alfonso Esparza Oteo, María Grever, Arturo Tolentino, Miguel Lerdo de Tejada and Francisco Gabilondo Soler.

He performed on the XEW radio show La hora azul. He also appeared in the Telesistema Mexicano programs De visita a las 7 (1959) and El Estudio de Pedro Vargas (1959), and later in four episodes of the Televisa show Variedades de medianoche (1977).

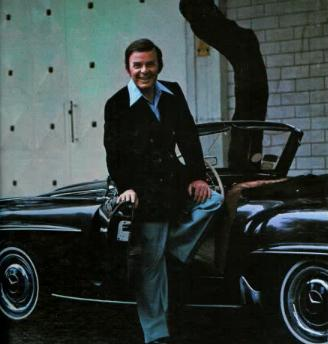
Avendaño in his Mercedes 190 SL in Mexico D.F.

== Personal life ==
He was married many years to the soprano Graziella Garza. Together they had 3 children: Hugo Avendaño, Rodrigo and Laura Graziella. He was afflicted for some years with pancreatic cancer and died on January 5, 1998.

== Radio and television ==
- The Blue Hour
- De visita a las 7
- El estudio de Pedro Vargas
- Variedades de Medianoche
- Noches Tapatías

== Filmography ==
- El Gallo Colorado (1957)
- Melodías inolvidables (1959)
- La Valentina (1966)
