= Broncho (disambiguation) =

Broncho is a less common spelling of bronco, a horse with a propensity to buck.

It may also refer to:

== Sports teams ==
- Cleveland Bronchos, an unofficial name promoted by the players of the Cleveland Bluebirds baseball team (now the Cleveland Guardians) in 1902
- Calgary Bronchos, a minor league baseball team in the Western Canada League (1910-1914, 1920-1921)
- Rochester Bronchos, a minor league baseball team between 1899 and 1911, based in Rochester, New York
- San Antonio Bronchos, a minor league baseball team between 1903 and 1919, based in San Antonio, Texas
- San Angelo Bronchos, a minor league baseball team in 1921 and 1922, based in San Angelo, Texas
- Central Oklahoma Bronchos, the sports teams of the University of Central Oklahoma
- The sports teams of Bayless Senior High School, Affton, Missouri
- The sports teams of Bethany High School, Bethany, Oklahoma
- The sports teams of Holly High School, Holly, Michigan
- The sports teams of Jefferson High School (Indiana), Lafayette, Indiana
- The sports teams of Odessa High School, Odessa, Texas

== Other uses ==
- Broncho (band), an American indie rock band
- Broncho Ski Trail; see List of trails of Lewis and Clark County, Montana

== See also ==
- Broncho Billy Anderson (1880–1971), American actor, writer, director and producer, the first star of Western films, born Maxwell Henry Aronson
- San Antonio Black Bronchos, a Negro league baseball team that played in 1908 and 1909
- Bronco (disambiguation)
