= European Football League =

American football league, 1986–2018

- Sport: Gridiron football
- Founded: 1986; 40 years ago
- Folded: 2018; 8 years ago
- No. of teams: 6
- Continent: Europe
- Last champion: Potsdam Royals
- Most titles: Vienna Vikings (5)
- Promotion to: BIG6 European Football League
- Website: Eurobowl.info

The European Football League (EFL) established in 1986, was a tournament for the best European American football teams affiliated to IFAF (International Federation of American Football - Europe), which replaced the European Federation of American Football (EFAF) in 2014.

Until 2013, the final game of the EFL was the Eurobowl, which has been held annually since 1986. In 2014, the EFL was replaced as Europe's top-tier club competition by the new BIG6 European Football League and the EFL Bowl was introduced as the new final game of the EFL. The 2018 EFL season was the last edition of the tournament.

== EFL ==
Under the governance of EFAF, the best American Football teams in Europe participate in annual competitions. Until 2013, the EFL was the first-tier competition for American football clubs in Europe. EFAF determined the relative strength of each of its 17 affiliate leagues and allocated teams to the 4 divisions accordingly, thus not all nations took part. National league champions, runners-up or teams with international success were eligible for the EFL. Teams from 'weaker' leagues could take part in the EFAF Cup. The final game of the EFL was the Eurobowl, which has been held annually since 1986.

In 2014, the BIG6 European Football League was introduced as the new top-tier competition of American football in Europe. The EFL continued to be played as a second-tier competition, with its teams playing for the newly created EFL Bowl trophy. The inaugural EFL Bowl was won by the Kiel Baltic Hurricanes of Germany against Spain's Badalona Dracs on 20 July 2014.

From 2017 on, the EFL Bowl winners may play a relegation game against the last placed team of the BIG6, and be promoted to the BIG6 if they win. This relegation game never happened.

== Rosters ==
Every team in the European Football League had to publish its 60-man roster. After that no player can be added. Every game day the teams have to nominate an EFAF active game day roster, which is limited to 45 players with a maximum of 3 active Americans as defined USA, Canadian, Mexican or Japanese passport holders. These three players may all be on the field at the same time.

== Format ==
Until 2013, EFL teams were split into 4 divisions of 3 or 2 teams. In a division of 3, teams played 2 matches; once at home to one opponent and the other away to the other opponent. In a division of 2 teams, each team played each other home and away. The division winners then advanced to the play-offs.

The play-off format was changed for the 2008 season. The tournament was expanded to an eight-team competition. The two finalists from the 2007 season, Vienna Vikings and Marburg Mercenaries, earned automatic berths for the next season and the two semi-finalists, Eidsvoll 1814's from Norway and Tirol Raiders from Austria, earned a spot for the national champions of their respective countries. In quarterfinals these teams faced the four winners of the divisional round. In semi-finals teams were paired by the Eurobowl seeding system, with the best-seeded team facing the worst and the second-best facing the second-worst. Winners then advanced to the Eurobowl.

With the start of the Big6 in 2014, the format of the EFL changed again. Six teams played in two divisions of three teams. The winners of the groups advanced to the EFL Bowl.

== EFL Bowls ==
For a list of champions by year before 2014, see Eurobowl.

Game	Year	Date	City	Winners	Sco	Runners-up	Attendance	MVP
I	2014	19 July 2014	Kiel, Germany	Kiel Baltic Hurricanes (Germany)	40–0	Badalona Dracs (Spain)	2,104	Garrett Andrews (KBH)
II	2015	27 June 2015	Kiel, Germany	Kiel Baltic Hurricanes (Germany)	49–28	Allgäu Comets (Germany)	1,752	
III	2016	11 June 2016	Frankfurt, Germany	Frankfurt Universe (Germany)	35–21	Amsterdam Crusaders (Netherlands)	6,056	Jesse Lewis (FU)
IV	2017	10 June 2017	Thonon-les-Bains, France	Thonon Black Panthers (France)	29–20	Rhinos Milano (Italy)	2,500	Stephen Yepmo (TBP)
V	2018	9 June 2018	Sesto San Giovanni, Italy	Potsdam Royals (Germany)	43–42	Seamen Milano (Italy)	2,500	Kahlif Rector (SM)

== Records and statistics ==
=== By club ===
Club	Won	Runner-up	Years won^{†}	Years runner-up^{†}
(Austria) Vikings Vienna	5	5	2004, 2005, 2006, 2007, 2013	2001, 2003, 2008, 2010, 2012
(Austria) Swarco Raiders Tirol	3	1	2008, 2009, 2011	2013
(Italy) Bergamo Lions	3	3	2000, 2001, 2002	1994, 2004, 2005
(Germany) Hamburg Blue Devils	3	2	1996, 1997, 1998	1999, 2000
(Netherlands) Amsterdam Crusaders	2	4	1991, 1992	1988, 1989, 1993, 2016
(Germany) Braunschweig Lions	2	1	1999, 2003	2002
(United Kingdom) London Olympians	2	1	1993, 1994	1995
(Germany) Kiel Baltic Hurricanes	2	0	2014, 2015	
(Germany) Berlin Adler	1	2	2010	1991, 2011
(Italy) Legnano Frogs	1	1	1989	1990
(Germany) Potsdam Royals	1	0	2018	
(France) Thonon Black Panthers	1	0	2017	
(Germany) Frankfurt Universe	1	0	2016	
(Switzerland) Calanda Broncos	1	0	2012	
(Germany) Düsseldorf Panther	1	0	1995	
(United Kingdom) Manchester Spartans	1	0	1990	
(Finland) Helsinki Roosters	1	0	1988	
(Finland) Taft Vantaa	1	0	1986	
(France) La Courneuve Flash	0	3		1998, 2006, 2009
(Spain) Badalona Dracs	0	1		2014

- ^{†} Listed are Eurobowls from 1986 to 2013 and EFL Bowls from 2014 on.

=== By country ===
Championships	Country	Year
11	Germany	1995, 1996, 1997, 1998, 1999, 2003, 2010, 2014, 2015, 2016, 2018
8	Austria	2004, 2005, 2006, 2007, 2008, 2009, 2011, 2013
4	Italy	1989, 2000, 2001, 2002
3	United Kingdom	1990, 1993, 1994
2	Netherlands	1991, 1992
2	Finland	1986, 1988
1	France	2017
1	Switzerland	2012

== See also ==
- Eurobowl
- German Football League
- EFAF
- Austrian Football League
- Italian Football League
