= Bronco, Georgia =

Unincorporated community in Georgia, U.S.

Coordinates: 34°39′36″N 85°20′34″W

Bronco is an unincorporated community in Walker County, in the U.S. state of Georgia.

== History ==
A post office called Bronco was established in 1884, and remained in operation until 1905. The community was named after the bronco horse. A variant name was "Sylvan Bower". Bronco once supported a schoolhouse, the Bronco School, now defunct.
