= Paul Troth (American football coach) =

American football player and coach

Biographical details
- Born: c. 1962 (age 63–64)

Playing career
- 1981–1984: William Jewell
- Position: Quarterback

Coaching career (HC unless noted)
- 1992: St. Thomas (MN) (RB)
- 1993–1996: Lambuth (OC)
- 1997–2001: Huron
- 2002–2023: Missouri Valley

Head coaching record
- Overall: 183–114
- Tournaments: 11–11 (NAIA playoffs)

Accomplishments and honors

Championships
- 1 DAC (2000); 5 HAAC (2006, 2011–2014)

Paul Troth (born c. 1962) is an American college football coach and former player. He was the head football coach at Missouri Valley College from 2002 to 2023. Troth served as the head football coach at Huron University in Huron, South Dakota from 1997 to 2001. Troth played college football at William Jewell College in Liberty, Missouri, starring from 1981 to 1984 under head coach Vic Wallace.

== Europe ==
Troth played quarterback for several seasons professionally in Europe most notably for the Amsterdam Crusaders, winning the 1991 Eurobowl championship. He first signed in 1985 with the East City Giants in the Finnish Vaahteraliiga. He also began his coaching career in Europe.

Troth was subsequently an assistant coach under Wallace at University of St. Thomas in Minnesota and Lambuth University in Jackson, Tennessee.

== Head coaching record ==
Year	Team	Overall	Conference	Standing	Bowl/playoffs	NAIA^{#}
Huron Screaming Eagles (South Dakota-Iowa Intercollegiate Conference) (1997–1999)
1997	Huron	4–6	3–3	T–3rd		
1998	Huron	10–3	4–1	2nd	L NAIA Semifinal	
1999	Huron	8–3	4–1	2nd	L NAIA First Round	11
Huron Screaming Eagles (Dakota Athletic Conference) (2000–2001)
2000	Huron	9–3	8–1	T–1st	L NAIA Quarterfinal	8
2001	Huron	7–3	7–2	3rd		21
Huron:		38–18	26–8			
Missouri Valley Vikings (Heart of America Athletic Conference) (2002–2023)
2002	Missouri Valley	8–2	8–2	T–2nd		20
2003	Missouri Valley	5–5	5–5	T–4th		
2004	Missouri Valley	4–6	4–6	T–6th		
2005	Missouri Valley	5–6	4–6	7th		
2006	Missouri Valley	13–1	10–0	1st	L NAIA Semifinal	3
2007	Missouri Valley	10–3	8–2	T–2nd	L NAIA Semifinal	3
2008	Missouri Valley	7–3	7–3	4th		17
2009	Missouri Valley	8–3	8–2	3rd	L NAIA First Round	10
2010	Missouri Valley	8–2	8–2	3rd		17
2011	Missouri Valley	9–2	8–1	T–1st	L NAIA First Round	10
2012	Missouri Valley	12–1	9–0	1st	L NAIA Semifinal	3
2013	Missouri Valley	9–3	8–1	T–1st	L NAIA Quarterfinal	7
2014	Missouri Valley	9–3	8–1	T–1st	L NAIA Quarterfinal	8
2015	Missouri Valley	6–5	3–2	3rd (South)		
2016	Missouri Valley	9–3	4–1	2nd (South)	L NAIA First Round	11
2017	Missouri Valley	5–6	3–2	3rd (South)		
2018	Missouri Valley	3–7	1–3	T–4th (South)		
2019	Missouri Valley	3–8	0–5	6th (South)		
2020–21	Missouri Valley	1–6	0–5	6th (South)		
2021	Missouri Valley	3–8	0–5	6th (South)		
2022	Missouri Valley	3–8	0–5	6th (South)		
2023	Missouri Valley	5–5	2–3	4th (South)		
Missouri Valley:		144–96	108–62			
Total:		183–114				
National championship Conference title Conference division title or championship game berth
