= José "El Bronco" Venegas =

Mexican singer and film actor

José Venegas, known as "El Bronco", was a Mexican singer and film actor best known as Epigmenio Zúñiga in the film La Valentina. Originally from San Buenaventura, Chihuahua, Venegas was born José Montaño. After having migrated to Mexico City, in order to pursue his talent, Venegas appeared in five films in which he also sang until an alleged confrontation with Pedro Infante stooped his career.

== Discography ==
1. El Bronco (album)
  1. "Flor silvestre"
  2. "No soy monedita de oro"
  3. "La noche y tú"
  4. "rítenme piedras del campo"
  5. "La vida alegre"
  6. "Rogaciano"
  7. "Paloma sin nido"
  8. "Los camperos"
  9. "Sufriendo a solas"
  10. "Tu enamorado"

== Filmography ==
- Si usted no puede, yo sí (1951)
- Qué lindo Cha Cha Cha (1955)
- Los platillos voladores (1956)
- Dos novias para un torero (1956)
- La Valentina (1966)
