= Amsterdam Crusaders =

Dutch American football club

Logo

General information
- Founded: 1984
- Stadium: Sportpark Sloten (1984–present)
- Headquartered: Amsterdam, Netherlands
- Colors: Red and Silver (White and Black are secondary colors)

Personnel
- General manager: Robert von Gerhardt
- Head coach: Vittorio Alfarez

Nicknames
- Cru-Family, Cru

League / conference affiliations
- AFBN Division One (2001–present); NAFF Division One (1984–2000)

Championships
- Tulip Bowl Championship: 0; 22 (1987, 1988, 1989, 1990, 1991, 1993, 1998, 1999, 2002, 2003, 2004, 2005, 2006, 2008, 2009, 2010, 2015, 2016, 2017, 2019, 2022, 2025)
- Eurobowl Championship: 0; 2 (1991, 1992)

The Amsterdam Crusaders is an American football club from Amsterdam, Netherlands founded in 1984. Together with the Rotterdam Trojans and Alphen Eagles, the Amsterdam Crusaders is the oldest surviving Dutch American Football club.

== Beginnings ==
The Crusaders started as a spin-off of the former Amsterdam Rams in the spring of 1984. Several former players decided it was time to have another team in Amsterdam. This initiative became official on 6 September 1984. At the office of the Amsterdam Notary Loeff & van der Ploeg the three legal founders (Winston Ronde, Marc van Velzen and Anthony da Costa Gomes) signed the documents to become an official team (Vereniging). In the years that followed they grew into a team capable of playing at both national and international levels.

The 1980s saw frequent Dutch League American Football Bond Nederland battles with fierce rivals Amsterdam Rams, The Hague Raiders and Utrecht Vikings for places in the Tulip Bowl and European Football League playoffs.

== Eurobowls, FLE and NFLE ==
The Crusaders joined the European elite by reaching the Eurobowl final in 1988, with upset wins over the London Ravens and Berlin Adler in the quarter and semi-finals of the European Football League EFL tournament, only to lose against the Helsinki Roosters (35–14) in the EuroBowl championship final game. The Roosters ran a power wishbone attack with Mike Kane, former All-American running back at CSUN. He scored 4 TDs and was elected the game's MVP. In 1989 Amsterdam again reached the final, unfortunately losing a thriller 27–23 to the Legnano Frogs (Italy). In 1990, the "third Crusade" ended in Manchester (UK) when the Manchester Spartans defended three drives from the Crusaders in the 4th quarter to progress on their way to a European title.

In 1991, the Amsterdam Crusaders won Eurobowl V with a 21–20 win over the Berlin Adler in Offenbach, with safety Najib Nakad blocking a Berlin PAT to secure a hard-fought win and became European champions. Later that year, the Amsterdam Crusaders played a regular season exhibition game against San Francisco State University. A year later, Eurobowl VI was added to the "Cru" trophy cabinet with a 42–21 win over Torino Giaguari (Italy) at Uppsala, Sweden. 1993 saw the Crusaders reach their 5th Eurobowl final in six years, this time in the setting of the Heysel Stadium, Brussels. In a fantastic game, the London Olympians proved too strong for the Crusaders.

1994 saw the Amsterdam Crusaders leave the Dutch competition to join the Football League of Europe. Regular games against Finnish, English, German, Italian and Swedish teams made for a fascinating competition. However, this league lasted only two seasons before folding due to large costs.

The "Cru" returned to Dutch competition in 1996 and set about building up the club to include flag football, youth and senior teams.

During the lifetime of the NFL Europe, the Amsterdam Crusaders provided the Amsterdam Admirals with the bulk of national players coming out of the Netherlands. Amsterdam Crusader coaches have often been involved in the coaching staff of the Dutch Lions - the Netherlands' national team.

The Amsterdam Crusaders have signed former NFL players. Romeo Bandison played for the Cleveland Browns and Washington Redskins of the NFL. Glenn Dennison who played for the New York Jets and won a Super Bowl ring with the Washington Redskins, before signing and playing for the Crusaders in 1989.

== Recent history ==
In recent years Amsterdam Crusaders have dominated the American Football Bond Nederland competition, having won 8 of the last 9 national titles. In 2006, they posted their first undefeated season in many years, but were made to fight for the ultimate crown by the Delft Dragons, who were only defeated in overtime - the only time this has occurred in the Tulip Bowl's history. In 2010, the Cru posted a second consecutive perfect record on their way to their 16th National title.

The Amsterdam Crusaders have failed to reach the Tulip Bowl only four times (1986, 1992, 2001 and 2011) in the 25 seasons they have competed in the Dutch domestic league (did not compete in 1994 and 1995 due to participation in Football League of Europe).

In 2006 Amsterdam returned to European competition by entering the EFAF Cup. The Crusaders were given a tough draw and lost their group games 23–0 to 2005 finalists Templiers d'Elancourt and 38–14 to eventual semi-finalists Zurich Renegades.

In 2007, the Crusaders were handed a tough EFAF Cup draw, with an away trip to Oslo Vikings followed by a home matchup vs the German Football League's Berlin Adler. Amsterdam provided a surprise result in the opening game, defeating the Vikings 27–21 only two weeks after Oslo had defeated Berlin in Germany, but a 34–6 to the Adler in Amsterdam meant they failed to reach the semi-final.

On 28 October 2007, Amsterdam Crusaders failed to make it 6 Dutch championships in a row, losing 25–16 to Maastricht Wildcats in the national championship game, Tulip Bowl XXIII.

The 2008 season saw another national championship. On 13 July 2008 the Cru won the Tulip Bowl for the 14th time in their history after a 7–3 regular season, ensuring they enter their 25th year of existence as Dutch Champion. Amsterdam avenged Tulip Bowl XXIII by defeating Maastricht Wildcats 20–8 with touchdown passes from Claudio Bartolozzi to Wide receiver Renze Burgers and Tight end Marcus Muler, and an interception return for a touchdown by Stef Hupsel.

The 2008 EFAF Cup saw the Crusaders perform admirably with some impressive defensive performances in a 26–12 loss to Berlin Adler of the German Football League in Berlin. Amsterdam hosted Danish champions Triangle Razorbacks on 20 April 2008 but slipped to a disappointing 3–0 loss to end their Euro season for 2008.

For the Amsterdam Crusaders, 2009 was a special year as they celebrated their 25th anniversary. They completed their regular season schedule with a perfect 10–0 record scoring 320 points in the process and conceding only 33, including 7 shut-outs. The Cru destroyed old foes Rotterdam Trojans 60–3 on 21 June in the AFBN playoffs and on 12 July dismissed Lightning Leiden 36–7 to win their 15th Tulip Bowl.

Amsterdam's EFAF Cup campaign also saw success. On 18 April 18 the Crusaders pulled off a come-from-behind victory in England against the Farnham Knights of Great Britain as QB Claudio Bartolozzi and WR Revilinho Graanoogst connected for a 7-yard score as time expired. On 2 May 2009, the Cru sealed their first ever EFAF Cup semi-final spot by defeating the highly rated Oslo Vikings in Amsterdam by a score of 10–6. On Sunday 7 June, the Crusaders were unable to reach the final, losing 21–3 in the Czech Republic to Czech champions and eventual EFAF Cup 2009 champions Prague Panthers. However, it was a very admirable cup run considering the budget and there were high hopes for the future. The Amsterdam Crusaders finished the 2009 season in 18th place in the European Top 20 as ranked by EFAF.

The Cru's 25th regular season began in March 2010. Amsterdam sealed their second undefeated regular season in a row with a come-from-behind win against Lelystad Commanders on 13 June 2010. Amsterdam reached their 9th consecutive Tulip Bowl with a 43–16 win over Alphen Eagles in the playoff game on 20 June 2010. The Crusaders achieved a first in the Netherlands - a second consecutive undefeated championship season by defeating Maastricht Wildcats 28–22 on 4 July in their record 9th consecutive Tulip Bowl appearance.

Amsterdam's EFAF Cup season ended prematurely after a defeat in a visit to Les Cougars de St-Ouen l'Aumone (France) and a 35–7 home reverse versus British champions London Blitz.

Including post-season games, the Crusaders' winning streak managed a 27-game winning stream in the American Football Bond Nederland competition stretching from the end of the 2008 season until the end of the 2010 season.

In 2022 the entered the BNL Football League, which they won the first three seasons.

== 2011 season ==
Amsterdam's 2011 regular season began with a home match-up against Alphen Eagles on 6 March 2011.

The Crusaders were beaten for the first time in 28 domestic competitive games, losing 12–7 after narrowly failing to complete a 99-yard TD drive inside the two-minute warning. The Cru bounced back with wins against Lelystad Commanders (34–32), Maastricht Wildcats (16–13), Amsterdam Panthers (34–0), Lightning Leiden (45–0) and the return against Lelystad Commanders (50–22) to extend their record to 5–1 for the season. Further losses (40–22 to Alphen Eagles and 27–14 at Maastricht Wildcats) dropped Amsterdam's record to 5–3. Amsterdam closed out the regular season with a 7–3 record after wins against Amsterdam Panthers (29–16) and Lightning Leiden (45–0).

On 3 June 2011, the Cru were denied a place in the Tulip Bowl by Maastricht Wildcats, losing 29–12 in the national semi-final game in Maastricht.

Amsterdam's 2011 EFAF Cup group stage started with a record defeat, losing 68–6 to Great Britain National Champions London Blitz on 9 April in Finsbury Park, London. On 14 May, the Cru defeated Spain's Valencia Firebats 27–19 in Amsterdam.

== Coaches ==
COACHING STAFF 2026
| Name | Position |
| Vittorio Alfarez | Head coach |
| Alejandro Alfarez | Offensive coordinator |
| Leif Erik von Borstel | Defensive Coordinator |
| Nico Hamel | Linebackers coach |
| Bruce Tamara | Defensive line coach |
| Jay Wijnhold | Offensive line coach |
| Steve Vriese | Running backs coach |
| Nicky Bakker | Defensive backs coach |
| Demierro Promes | Assistant defensive backs coach |
| Edu Brooke | Wide receivers coach |
| Cary Grossart | Quarterbacks coach |

== Roster 2026 ==
Roster 2026
| Nummer | Positie | Naam |
| 6 | Quarterback | Dylan Bakker |
| 15 | Quarterback | Mikael Bruev |
| 26 | Quarterback | Thomas Jackson |
| 14 | Running back | Jordi Anröchte |
| 19 | Running back | Amar Wong |
| 20 | Running back | Chinecherem Ugwuozer |
| 24 | Running back | Jeanmar Wady |
| 34 | Running back | Ricco Bos |
| 48 | Running back | Tim Blom |
| 4 | Wide receiver | Jamairo Chirino |
| 9 | Wide receiver | Jasper Nijland |
| 17 | Wide receiver | Davey Noor |
| 27 | Wide receiver | Eloy Hart |
| 28 | Wide receiver | Ruben Van Gessel |
| 33 | Wide receiver | Olivier Lugier |
| 85 | Wide receiver | Vaisel Voorn |
| 86 | Wide receiver | Dennis Suikerbuik |
| 88 | Wide receiver | Kelechi Bakker |
| 44 | Tight end | John Hanbury |
| 45 | Tight end | Lleyton Wareman |
| 89 | Tight end | Cem Turan |
| 52 | Offensive lind | Laurin Felix |
| 58 | Offensive line | Sem Van Duijn |
| 59 | Offensive line | Max Van Hilten |
| 63 | Offensive line | Ramon Twisk |
| 65 | Offensive line | Luis Flores |
| 67 | Offensive line | Leroy Refos |
| 68 | Offensive line | Alex Molenaar |
| 69 | Defensive line | Youri Boeschoten |
| 90 | Defensive line | Miquel Darson |
| 91 | Defensive line | Rein Smith |
| 92 | Defensive line | Skylar Verhoef |
| 96 | Defensive line | Cengiz Orscek |
| 97 | Defensive line | Raidel Uiterloo |
| 99 | Defensive line | Florian van der Vegt |
| 5 | Linebacker | Lorenzo Gavioli |
| 6 | Linebacker | Brian Snoek |
| 12 | Linebacker | Travis Fraser |
| 23 | Linebacker | Gabriel Silva |
| 42 | Linebacker | Timo Wittkamp |
| 43 | Linebacker | Wouter Vd Steen |
| 44 | Linebacker | Tommy Hermse |
| 3 | Cornerback | Ronny Van Waard Castillo |
| 17 | Cornerback | Ole Schieders |
| 19 | Cornerback | Achmed El Hassan |
| 22 | Cornerback | Julius Dollard |
| 25 | Cornerback | Sidney Kunst |
| 26 | Cornerback | Vincent Thamm |
| 32 | Cornerback | Gaisel Voorn |
| 2 | Safety | Noah Young |
| 29 | Safety | Alexis Bast |
| 31 | Safety | Luciano Noteboom |
| 35 | Safety | Thomas van den Oort |
| 21 | Safety | Keanu Deira |
| 10 | Kicker | Dion Hendricks |

== Notable former players ==
| (United States) | Glenn Dennison (TE): | Played for New York Jets of NFL and was Super Bowl champion with the Washington Redskins before joining Crusaders in 1989. |
| (United States) | Paul Troth (QB): | Led the Crusaders to win the 1991 Eurobowl championship. Head Coach of Missouri Valley College since 2002. |
| (Netherlands) | Romeo Bandison (DT): | Played for University of Oregon, Cleveland Browns, Washington Redskins and Amsterdam Admirals. Coached at Boise State University. Currently DL coach at University of Colorado. |
| (Netherlands) | Jimmy Geduld: | Dutch Soap actor. |
| (Netherlands) | Hubert Bedford (LB): | Dutch sports presenter. |
| (Netherlands) | Ronald Buys (RB): | Became General Manager of Amsterdam Admirals between 1999 and 2005. |
| (Netherlands) | Arnold Galesloot (LB): | Played as TE for the Amsterdam Admirals and was the only Dutch player to score a touchdown for the Admirals on Dutch soil. Currently Defensive Line coach at the Crusaders |
| (Netherlands) | Niels Meijer (WR): | Played for Amsterdam Admirals of NFL Europe. |
| (Netherlands) | Akwasi Mensah (LB): | Played for Amsterdam Admirals in 2006 and 2007. |
| (Netherlands) | Amilcar Grot (DB): | Played for Amsterdam Admirals in 2005. |

== See also ==
- List of American football teams in the Netherlands
