= Tulip Bowl =

Match type in the AFBN's Division One

The Tulip Bowl is the final match in the season of the AFBN Division One, the top division of the American Football Bond Nederland (AFBN). The AFBN is the organisation responsible for American football in the Netherlands. The Tulip Bowl participants are determined through the playoffs and the match determines the Dutch champions in the sport of American football. The first championship game was played in 1985 under the name Super Bowl, before it became its current name in the second edition.

There are also other Bowl games, including the Division Two Bowl and the Dyan Kralt Bowl for the youth competition.

The Amsterdam Crusaders are the dominating team with 23 wins.

== History ==
Bowl	Date	Champions	Runners-Up	Score	Host city
I	1985	Amsterdam Rams	Amsterdam Crusaders	36–14	Utrecht
II	1986	Den Haag Raiders	Amsterdam Rams	32–13	Amsterdam
III	1987	Amsterdam Crusaders	Den Haag Raiders	47–13	Wassenaar
IV	1988	Amsterdam Crusaders	Amsterdam Rams	20–17	Rotterdam
V	1989	Amsterdam Crusaders	Amsterdam Rams	36–0	Zaandam
VI	1990	Amsterdam Crusaders	Den Haag Raiders	28–22	Amsterdam
VII	1991	Amsterdam Crusaders	Den Haag Raiders	22–11	Dordrecht
VIII	1992	Den Haag Raiders	Utrecht Vikings	42–13	Arnhem
IX	1993	Amsterdam Crusaders	Den Haag Raiders	15–14	Zoetermeer
X	1994	Den Haag Raiders	Tilburg Steelers	20–6	Tilburg
XI	1995	Tilburg Steelers	Rotterdam Trojans	26–6	Rotterdam
XII	1996	Rotterdam Trojans	Amsterdam Crusaders	4–0	
XIII	1997	Rotterdam Trojans	Amsterdam Crusaders	17–10	Amsterdam
XIV	1998	Amsterdam Crusaders	Hilversum Hurricanes	20–11	Almere
XV	1999	Amsterdam Crusaders	Hilversum Hurricanes	36–0	Hilversum
XVI	2000	Hilversum Hurricanes	Amsterdam Crusaders	24–0	Hoorn
XVII	2001	Hilversum Hurricanes	Limburg Wildcats	7–6	Arnhem
XVIII	2002	Amsterdam Crusaders	Rotterdam Trojans	7–0	Hilversum
XIX	2003	Amsterdam Crusaders	Hilversum Hurricanes	6–2	Rotterdam
XX	2004	Amsterdam Crusaders	Hilversum Hurricanes	22–6	Arnhem
XXI	2005	Amsterdam Crusaders	Hilversum Hurricanes	18–6	Arnhem
XXII	2006	Amsterdam Crusaders	Delft Dragons	27–20 (OT)	Lelystad
XXIII	2007	Maastricht Wildcats	Amsterdam Crusaders	25–16	Amsterdam
XXIV	2008	Amsterdam Crusaders	Maastricht Wildcats	20–8	Arnhem
XXV	2009	Amsterdam Crusaders	Lightning Leiden	36–7	Rotterdam
XXVI	2010	Amsterdam Crusaders	Maastricht Wildcats	28–22	Nijmegen
XXVII	2011	Maastricht Wildcats	Alphen Eagles	16–14	Hilversum
XXVIII	2012	Alphen Eagles	Amsterdam Crusaders	34–3	Almere
XXIX	2013	Alphen Eagles	Amsterdam Crusaders	23–12	Arnhem
XXX	2014	Alphen Eagles	Amsterdam Crusaders	14–12	Arnhem
XXXI	2015	Amsterdam Crusaders	Alphen Eagles	21–6	Arnhem
XXXII	2016	Amsterdam Crusaders	010 Trojans	40–6	Amsterdam
XXXIII	2017	Amsterdam Crusaders	010 Trojans	33–13	Almere
XXXIV	2018	Hilversum Hurricanes	Lelystad Commanders	24–13	Amsterdam
XXXV	July 7, 2019	Amsterdam Crusaders	Lelystad Commanders	37–7	Arnhem
XXXVI	July 3, 2022	Amsterdam Crusaders	010 Trojans	50–0	Amsterdam
XXXVII	July 9, 2023	Lightning Leiden	Lelystad Commanders	14–9	Almere Haven
XXXVIII	July 7, 2024	Lightning Leiden	Maastricht Wildcats	24–14	Leiden (Sportpark Montgomery)
XXXIX	July 6, 2025	Amsterdam Crusaders	Groningen Giants	39–18	Amsterdam (Sportpark Sloten)
XL	July 12, 2026	Amsterdam Crusaders	Utrecht Dominators	35–13	Amsterdam (Sportpark Sloten)

== Statistics ==
=== Ranking of teams ===
Rank	Team	Champions	Runners-Up	Appearances
1	Amsterdam Crusaders	23	8	31
2	Hilversum Hurricanes	3	5	8
3	Den Haag Raiders	3	4	7
4	Alphen Eagles	3	2	5
5	Maastricht Wildcats^{†}	2	4	6
6	Rotterdam Trojans	2	2	4
7	Lightning Leiden	2	1	3
8	Amsterdam Rams	1	3	4
9	Tilburg Steelers	1	1	2
10	010 Trojans	–	3	3
10	Lelystad Commanders	–	3	3
12	Delft Dragons	–	1	1
12	Utrecht Vikings	–	1	1
12	Groningen Giants	–	1	1
12	Utrecht Dominators	–	1	1

- ^{†} Also known as Limburg Wildcats

=== Records ===
- Highest Scoring Tulip Bowl
  - 60 - Amsterdam Crusaders 47 vs 13 The Hague Raiders (1987)
- Lowest Scoring Tulip Bowl
  - 4 - Rotterdam Trojans 4 vs 0 Amsterdam Crusaders (1996)
- Biggest Winning Margin Tulip Bowl
  - 50 - Amsterdam Crusaders 50 vs 0 010 Trojans (2022)
- Consecutive Tulip Bowl wins
  - 5 - Amsterdam Crusaders (1987–1991 and 2002–2006)
  - 3 - Amsterdam Crusaders (2008–2010 and 2015–2017), Alphen Eagles (2012–2014)
  - 2 - Rotterdam Trojans (1996, 1997), Hilversum Hurricanes (2000, 2001), Lightning Leiden (2023, 2024)
- Consecutive Tulip Bowl losses
  - 3 - Hilversum Hurricanes (2003–2005), Amsterdam Crusaders (2012–2014)
  - 2 - Many teams
- Consecutive Tulip Bowl appearances
  - 9 - Amsterdam Crusaders (2002–2010)
  - 6 - Amsterdam Crusaders (2012–2017)
  - 5 - The Hague Raiders (1990–1994), Amsterdam Crusaders (1987–1991), Alphen Eagles (2011–2015)
  - 4 - Hilversum Hurricanes (1998–2001)
  - 3 - Rotterdam Trojans (1995–1997), Hilversum Hurricanes (2003–2005)
  - 2 - Many teams

== See also ==
- Belgian Bowl
- EFAF Atlantic Cup
