= 010 Trojans =

American football team based in Rotterdam, the Netherlands

General information
- Founded: 1984
- Stadium: Sportpark Olympia, Rotterdam (2018–present)
- Headquartered: Rotterdam, Netherlands
- Colors: Green and White

Personnel
- General manager: Roy Smith
- Head coach: Ruud Lieffering (Senior); Ruud Lieffering (Youth); Roy Wesseling (Flag)

Nickname
- Trojans

League / conference affiliations
- BNL Football League (2024–present); AFBN Division One (2001–2023); NAFF Premier Division (1989,1993–2000); NAFF Division One (1984–1988,1990–1992); AFLN Division One (1998–2000) Benelux League (1999–2000)

Championships
- Tulip Bowl Championship: 0; 2 (1996, 1997)

The 010 Trojans (formerly known as Rotterdam Trojans are an American football team based in Rotterdam, the Netherlands. Founded in 1984, the Trojans are the second oldest surviving team in the Netherlands, behind the Amsterdam Crusaders. Upon foundation, the Trojans immediately joined the national American Football body at the time, the NAFF (Nederlandse American Football Federatie).

After beginning in the second tier (NAFF Division One), the Trojans managed an undefeated championship season (12–0) in 1988 and gained promotion to the Premier Division. However, this step proved too much for the Trojans who were immediately relegated.

After a divisional reorganisation the Trojans moved back to the highest division, where they remain to this day. National Tulip Bowl titles were won in 1996 and 1997. Outside the NAFF, the Rotterdam Trojans also competed in the Eurobowl competitions in 1995 (losing in the first round to Birmingham Bulls) and reached the Eurobowl B final in 1996, losing 7–0 in the final to St. Gallen Seaside Vipers.

In 1998 the Trojans joined the breakaway AFLN (American Football League Nederland) and won two AFLN "National" championships. In addition, participation in the Dutch-Belgian Benelux League saw Rotterdam pick up two Benelux Bowl titles in 1999 and 2000 to add to their first (non-official) win in 1995.

In 2001 the NAFF and AFLN put aside their differences to merge into the current organisational structure: the AFBN (American Football Bond Nederland).

A large re-building operation over the last 6 years has seen Rotterdam have intermittent success, reaching the Tulip Bowl final in 2002 and the semi-finals several times.

In 2006 the Rotterdam Trojans returned to wearing their original team colours of green and white after several years of red and yellow. They played their home games at the renovated "City of Troje".

In 2012 the Rotterdam Trojans filed for bankruptcy, due to financial mismanagement and fraud by the then acting board. A new club was founded and called the 010 Trojans (010 is the area-code for the city of Rotterdam).

The team, led by head coach Michel "Moose" Storm, won the Div. 3 title in their first season, and lost the semi-final a year later. When Storm stepped down after a 5-5 season in 2015, offensive coordinator Wouter van den Boogaard was promoted to head coach. Playing in the highest division in the Netherlands, the Trojans upset the Alpen Eagles 14–17 in the playoffs in Van den Boogaard's first year and advanced to Tulip Bowl XXXII, losing to the Amsterdam Crusaders 40–6.

The following year saw the departure of head coach Wouter van den Boogaard and his staff and the hiring of new head coach Pascal Matla. The team duplicated their effort of the previous year, reaching the Tulip Bowl once again, only to lose once more to the Amsterdam Crusaders, this time by a score of 33–13.

Head coach Pascal Matla left for health reasons, and the team had a down year that following year, not winning a game and relegating to the first division.

== See also ==
- List of American football teams in the Netherlands
