= Manchester Spartans =

Former English gridiron football team

The Manchester Spartans were an American football club in Manchester, England. Founded in 1983 as the Northwich Spartans, they became Manchester Spartans in 1984, and were national champions in 1989 and 1990. They won the Eurobowl in 1990. The team folded in 1993.

== History ==
The Spartans were originally formed as the Northwich Spartans in 1983 and came to Manchester a year later. In 1985 they finished first in the Northern Division of the American Football League with a 10–2 record but lost to their neighbours Manchester Allstars in the first round of the playoffs. In 1986 they again finished with a 10–2 record and this time won their first-round playoff only to suffer a 35–7 defeat to Birmingham Bulls in the British American Football League semi-final playoffs.

In 1989, under player and coach Terry Smith, the team won the 1989 Budweiser title where they defeated Birmingham Bulls 21–14.

In 1990 they were National Champions for the second time, NDMA Coke Bowl I, Manchester Spartans 27-25 Northants Storm. The Spartans also won the Eurobowl with a victory in the final over the Legano Frogs in the same year.

== Head coaches ==
1984-1985 - George Aguado

1988-1990 - Terry Smith

1991 - Nigel Dias

1992 - Terry Smith

1993 - Terry Smith

== Notable former players ==
Terry Smith - Played for the New England Patriots in the NFL prior to England, was the Spartans player/head Coach, wide receiver and free safety. Smith was also the Head Coach of the Great Britain National Team, coaching Great Britain to its first European Nations Championship in 1989.

Tony Dollinger - Played for the Spartans in 1990 season helping the club to win the Eurobowl championship. NFL experience and British league before joining the Spartans.

== Titles ==
- National Champions of Great Britain : 1989, 1990
- Eurobowl: 1990
