= Maastricht Wildcats =

The Maastricht Wildcats (formerly called the Limburg Wildcats) of the AFBN (American Football Bond Nederland) are an American football League team from Maastricht. They play in the Dutch 1st division and are rivals to the Amsterdam Crusaders. They won the 2007 Dutch National Championship by defeating the Amsterdam Crusaders 25–16 in the Tulip Bowl. In 2004, the Wildcats, coached by Mel Crandall, won the 3rd Division Championship and advanced to the 2nd division. Then, in the 2005 season, they won the 2nd division championship and advanced to the 1st division.

In 2007, their player/Head Coach was Jon Horton.

Many of the current and past players of the Maastricht Wildcats are U.S. Military members, former American high school and collegiate players now stationed in the neighboring areas, and former German Football League players. The Maastricht Wildcats won the Dutch National Championships on October 28, 2007, by defeating the Amsterdam Crusaders, who had won the national title five times in a row, with a score of 25–16. However, on July 13, 2008, the Amsterdam Crusaders exacted revenge and regained the Tulip Bowl with a score of 20–8.

Despite posting a 9–1 regular season record and losing only to Amsterdam Crusaders, Maastricht's 2009 season fell flat as they were shocked 10–7 in the semi-final game by Lightning Leiden.

Another strong regular season in 2010 saw the Wildcats post an 8–2 record, losing only to Amsterdam Crusaders and Alphen Eagles. This time, Maastricht took care of business in the playoff game, dismissing the Amsterdam Panthers 44–20. Despite coming back strongly in the Tulip Bowl, the Wildcats were not quite able to overturn a 22-point first-half deficit, eventually losing the championship game 28–22 to rivals the Amsterdam Crusaders.
