= American Football Bond Nederland =

- Current season, competition or edition: 2026
- Sport: American football
- Founded: (1984), refounded 2001
- Divisions: AFBN Eredivisie, AFBN Eerste Divisie, AFBN Tweede Divisie
- No. of teams: 13
- Country: Netherlands
- Most recent champion: Amsterdam Crusaders (2025)
- Most titles: Amsterdam Crusaders (25)
- Website: afbn.nl

The American Football Bond Nederland (AFBN) is the governing body for American football in the Netherlands. The AFBN was founded 1984 and refounded in 2001 after the merger of the rival leagues Nederlandse American Football Federatie (NAFF) and American Football League Nederland (AFLN).

== History ==
=== Nederlandse American Football Federatie (NAFF) ===
The Nederlandse American Football Federatie (NAFF) was initially founded on 4 November 1984 by a co-operation between Bob de Jong of the Dutch broadcasting organization Veronica, Peggy Kooper of The Hague Raiders, René Koningferander of the Amsterdam Rams and the governing body of Dutch sport, the Nederlandse Sport Federatie (NSF). A year later, in 1985, the NAFF became a member of the NOC*NSF. The NAFF also became a member of the European Football League (EFL), later known as European Federation of American Football (EFAF).

In 1985, the first Dutch American football league competition took place. The 8 teams in the top (and in those days the only) division, would compete against each other for a place in the final of the Dutch American Football championship. The final, called the Super Bowl for one year only, was renamed to the Tulip Bowl in 1986 and has remained so to this day.

On 1 May 1986, another organization was formed: the American Football Officials Nederland (AFON). This body was to function as an independent, neutral organization whose main tasks were to recruit, train and deliver officials for AFBN games. Initially, US servicemen based in the Netherlands were recruited to officiate games and train others to become officials.

=== American Football League Nederland (AFLN) ===
In 1997, four teams from the NAFF broke away and formed their own organization and league under the name American Football League Nederland (AFLN). The AFLN ran from 1998 until the creation of the AFBN in 2001, with the Rotterdam Trojans winning the first AFLN championship.

=== American Football Bond Nederland (AFBN) ===
After 1998, the sport began to grow again with more teams springing up in the Netherlands. In 2001 the NAFF and AFLN organizations agreed to merge under the name American Football Bond Nederland (AFBN). This made it possible to organize different levels of play and three divisions were created. In 2005 this was reduced to the current format of two divisions with a third developmental tier.

The winners of the Premier League (Eredivisie) championship (the Tulip Bowl) are the official national champions of the Netherlands.

=== Premier League/Eredivisie ===
In 2026, the AFBN Premier League (Eredivisie) has five teams:

- Amsterdam Crusaders
- Lightning Leiden
- Arnhem Falcons
- Utrecht Dominators
- Groningen Giants

=== First Division ===
In 2026, the AFBN First Division (Eerste Divisie) has four teams.

- Maastricht Wildcats
- 010 Trojans
- Hilversum Hurricanes
- West Frisian Outlaws

=== Second Division ===
In 2026, the AFBN Second Division (Tweede Divisie) has four teams.

- Alphen Eagles
- Nijmegen Pirates
- Eindhoven Raptors
- Den Haag Raiders '99

== See also ==
- Belgian Football League
- EFAF Atlantic Cup
