= Eurobowl =

European American football contest

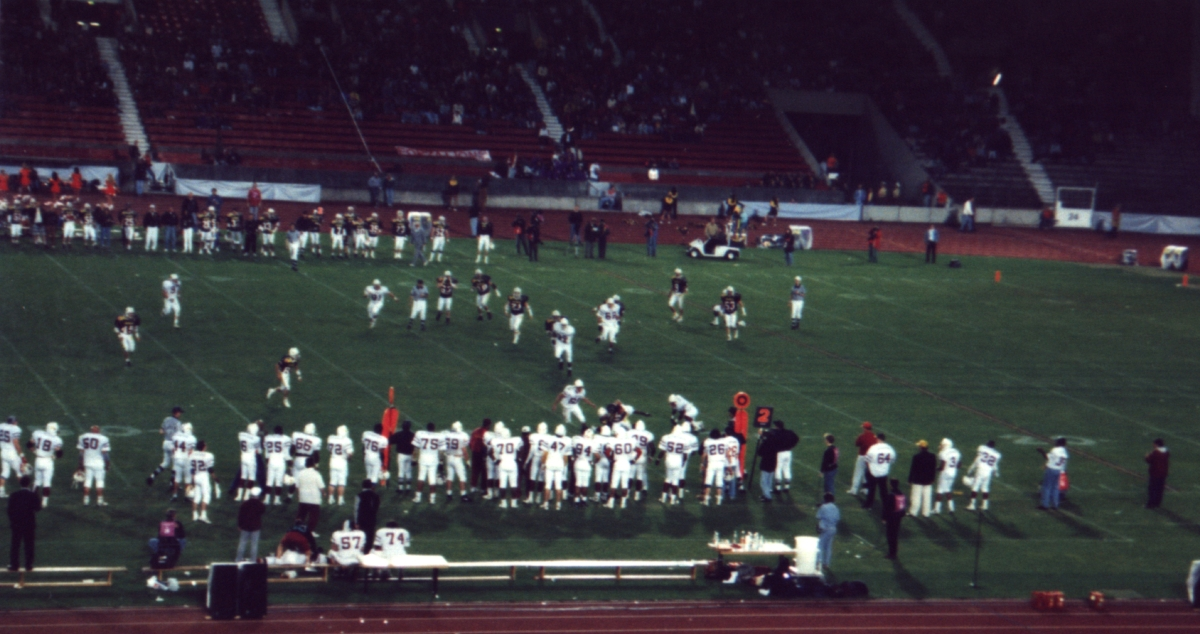
- Eurobowl VIII in 1994, Bergamo Lions vs. London Olympians
- In operation: 1986–2019
- Number of bowls: 33
- Television partner(s): Eurosport
- Most bowl appearances: Vienna Vikings (10)
- Most bowl championships: New Yorker Lions (6)
- Last championship game: 8 June 2019
- Website: http://www.eurobowl.info

The Eurobowl, first played in 1986, was the championship final game of a tournament style playoff to determine the champion of all of the American football leagues in Europe. The tournament featured the top or champion clubs from each country's top league that was called the European Football League (EFL). The first Eurobowl final was played in 1986 in Amsterdam.

After 2014, it was known as the BIG6 European Football League (BIG6). Before 2014, the Eurobowl was the final championship game of the European Football League.

The last BIG6 was played in 2018. The last Eurobowl was played on 8 June 2019 without any playoff league competition prior to the game. The Potsdam Royals beat the Amsterdam Crusaders 62–12.

With six titles, the New Yorker Lions from Braunschweig are the leading team in Eurobowl wins. The Vienna Vikings have the most appearances at 10, and winning five Eurobowl championship finals.

== Roster ==
Every team in the European Football League had to publish its 60-man roster. After that no player could be added. Every game day, the teams nominate an EFAF active game day roster, which is limited to 45 players with a maximum of three active Americans as defined USA, Canadian, Mexican or Japanese passport holders. These three players may all be on the field at the same time.

== Eurobowls ==
| Game | Year | Date | City | Winners | Score | Runners-up | MVP |
|---|---|---|---|---|---|---|---|
| I | 1986 | 16 August 1986 | Amsterdam, Netherlands | Taft Vantaa (Finland) | 20–16 | Bologna Doves (Italy) | Joe Jordan QB |
| II | 1988 | 7 August 1988 | London, United Kingdom | Helsinki Roosters (Finland) | 35–14 | Amsterdam Crusaders (Netherlands) | Mike Kane RB |
| III | 1989 | 22 July 1989 | Milan, Italy | Legnano Frogs (Italy) | 27–23 | Amsterdam Crusaders (Netherlands) | Robert Frasco QB |
| IV | 1990 | 28 July 1990 | Rimini, Italy | Manchester Spartans (United Kingdom) | 34–22 | Legnano Frogs (Italy) | |
| V | 1991 | 13 July 1991 | Offenbach, Germany | Amsterdam Crusaders (Netherlands) | 21–20 | Berlin Adler (Germany) | Paul Troth QB |
| VI | 1992 | | Uppsala, Sweden | Amsterdam Crusaders (Netherlands) | 42–24 | Giaguari Torino (Italy) | |
| VII | 1993 | 3 July 1993 | Brussels, Belgium | London Olympians (United Kingdom) | 42–21 | Amsterdam Crusaders (Netherlands) | Richard Dunkley RB |
| VIII | 1994 | 4 June 1994 | Stuttgart, Germany | London Olympians (United Kingdom) | 26–23 | Bergamo Lions (Italy) | Stephen Hutchinson RB |
| IX | 1995 | 8 July 1995 | Stuttgart, Germany | Düsseldorf Panther (Germany) | 21–14 | London Olympians (United Kingdom) | Francesco Mavaro RB |
| X | 1996 | 6 July 1996 | Stuttgart, Germany | Hamburg Blue Devils (Germany) | 21–14 | Aix-en-Provence Argonautes (France) | |
| XI | 1997 | | Stuttgart, Germany | Hamburg Blue Devils (Germany) | 35–14 | Bologna Phoenix (Italy) | |
| XII | 1998 | 5 July 1998 | Hamburg, Germany | Hamburg Blue Devils (Germany) | 38–19 | La Courneuve Flash (France) | |
| XIII | 1999 | 26 June 1999 | Hamburg, Germany | Braunschweig Lions (Germany) | 27–23 | Hamburg Blue Devils (Germany) | |
| XIV | 2000 | 17 June 2000 | Hamburg, Germany | Bergamo Lions (Italy) | 42–20 | Hamburg Blue Devils (Germany) | Tyrone Rush RB / Babak Movassaghi |
| XV | 2001 | 7 July 2001 | Vienna, Austria | Bergamo Lions (Italy) | 28–11 | Vikings Vienna (Austria) | |
| XVI | 2002 | 6 July 2002 | Braunschweig, Germany | Bergamo Lions (Italy) | 27–20 | Braunschweig Lions (Germany) | Dino Bucciol QB |
| XVII | 2003 | 5 July 2003 | Braunschweig, Germany | Braunschweig Lions (Germany) | 21–14 | Vikings Vienna (Austria) | Kim Kuci RB |
| XVIII | 2004 | 10 July 2004 | Vienna, Austria | Vikings Vienna (Austria) | 53–20 | Bergamo Lions (Italy) | Lance Gustafson RB / Peter Sangenette WR |
| XIX | 2005 | 8 July 2005 | Vienna, Austria | Vikings Vienna (Austria) | 29–6 | Bergamo Lions (Italy) | Lance Gustafson RB |
| XX | 2006 | 22 July 2006 | Vienna, Austria | Vikings Vienna (Austria) | 41–9 | La Courneuve Flash (France) | Mike Latek DL |
| XXI | 2007 | 1 July 2007 | Vienna, Austria | Vikings Vienna (Austria) | 70–19 | Marburg Mercenaries (Germany) | Josiah Cravalho RB/DB |
| XXII | 2008 | 5 July 2008 | Innsbruck, Austria | Swarco Raiders Tirol (Austria) | 28–24 | Vikings Vienna (Austria) | Florian Grein RB |
| XXIII | 2009 | 11 July 2009 | Innsbruck, Austria | Swarco Raiders Tirol (Austria) | 30–19 | La Courneuve Flash (France) | Florian Grein RB |
| XXIV | 2010 | 4 July 2010 | Vienna, Austria | Berlin Adler (Germany) | 34–31 | Vikings Vienna (Austria) | Benjamin Scharweit |
| XXV | 2011 | 18 June 2011 | Innsbruck, Austria | Swarco Raiders Tirol (Austria) | 27–12 | Berlin Adler (Germany) | Florian Grein RB |
| XXVI | 2012 | 21 July 2012 | Vaduz, Liechtenstein | Calanda Broncos (Switzerland) | 27–14 | Vikings Vienna (Austria) | DJ Wolfe RB |
| XXVII | 2013 | 6 July 2013 | Innsbruck, Austria | Vikings Vienna (Austria) | 37–14 | Swarco Raiders Tirol (Austria) | Christoph Gross QB |
| XXVIII | 2014 | 19 July 2014 | Berlin, Germany | Berlin Adler (Germany) | 20–17 | New Yorker Lions (Germany) | Darius Outlaw QB |
| XXIX | 2015 | 20 June 2015 | Braunschweig, Germany | New Yorker Lions (Germany) | 24–14 | Schwäbisch Hall Unicorns (Germany) | Casey Therriault QB |
| XXX | 2016 | 11 June 2016 | Innsbruck, Austria | New Yorker Lions (Germany) | 35–21 | Swarco Raiders Tirol (Austria) | Niklas Römer WR |
| XXXI | 2017 | 10 June 2017 | Frankfurt, Germany | New Yorker Lions (Germany) | 55–14 | Frankfurt Universe (Germany) | Casey Therriault QB |
| XXXII | 2018 | 9 June 2018 | Frankfurt, Germany | New Yorker Lions (Germany) | 20–19 | Frankfurt Universe (Germany) | Jadrian Clark QB |
| XXXIII | 2019 | 8 June 2019 | Potsdam, Germany | Potsdam Royals (Germany) | 62–12 | Amsterdam Crusaders (Netherlands) | Paul Zimmermann QB |

== Champions ==
=== By team ===
| Rank | Team | Titles | Appearances | Years won | Years runner-up |
|---|---|---|---|---|---|
| 1 | (Germany) Braunschweig Lions^{†} | 6 | 8 | 1999, 2003, 2015–2018 | 2002, 2014 |
| 2 | (Austria) Vikings Vienna | 5 | 10 | 2004–2007, 2013 | 2001, 2003, 2008, 2010, 2012 |
| 3 | (Italy) Bergamo Lions | 3 | 6 | 2000–2002 | 1994, 2004, 2005 |
| 4 | (Austria) Swarco Raiders Tirol | 3 | 5 | 2008, 2009, 2011 | 2013, 2016 |
| 4 | (Germany) Hamburg Blue Devils | 3 | 5 | 1996–1998 | 1999, 2000 |
| 6 | (Netherlands) Amsterdam Crusaders | 2 | 6 | 1991, 1992 | 1988, 1989, 1993, 2019 |
| 7 | (Germany) Berlin Adler | 2 | 4 | 2010, 2014 | 1991, 2011 |
| 8 | (United Kingdom) London Olympians | 2 | 3 | 1993, 1994 | 1995 |
| 9 | (Italy) Legnano Frogs | 1 | 2 | 1989 | 1990 |
| 10 | (Germany) Potsdam Royals | 1 | 1 | 2019 | |
| 10 | (Switzerland) Calanda Broncos | 1 | 1 | 2012 | |
| 10 | (Germany) Düsseldorf Panther | 1 | 1 | 1995 | |
| 10 | (United Kingdom) Manchester Spartans | 1 | 1 | 1990 | |
| 10 | (Finland) Helsinki Roosters | 1 | 1 | 1988 | |
| 10 | (Finland) Taft Vantaa | 1 | 1 | 1986 | |
| 16 | (France) La Courneuve Flash | 0 | 3 | | 1998, 2006, 2009 |
| 17 | (Germany) Frankfurt Universe | 0 | 2 | | 2017, 2018 |
| 18 | (Germany) Schwäbisch Hall Unicorns | 0 | 1 | | 2015 |
| 18 | (Germany) Marburg Mercenaries | 0 | 1 | | 2007 |
| 18 | (Italy) Bologna Phoenix | 0 | 1 | | 1997 |
| 18 | (France) Aix-en-Provence Argonautes | 0 | 1 | | 1996 |
| 18 | (Italy) Giaguari Torino | 0 | 1 | | 1992 |
| 18 | (Italy) Bologna Doves | 0 | 1 | | 1986 |

- ^{†} Known as New Yorker Lions between 2011 and 2025.

=== By country ===
| Championships | Country | Years won |
|---|---|---|
| 13 | Germany | 1995–1999, 2003, 2010, 2014–2019 |
| 8 | Austria | 2004–2009, 2011, 2013 |
| 4 | Italy | 1989, 2000–2002 |
| 3 | United Kingdom | 1990, 1993, 1994 |
| 2 | Netherlands | 1991, 1992 |
| 2 | Finland | 1986, 1988 |
| 1 | Switzerland | 2012 |
