= Tony Simmons (wide receiver) =

American gridiron football player and coach (born 1974)

No. 15, 18, 81, 82, 88
- Position: Wide receiver

Personal information
- Born: December 8, 1974 (age 51); Chicago, Illinois, U.S.
- Listed height: 6 ft 1 in (1.85 m)
- Listed weight: 212 lb (96 kg)

Career information
- High school: St. Rita (Chicago)
- College: Wisconsin
- NFL draft: 1998: 2nd round, 52nd overall pick

Career history

Playing
- New England Patriots (1998–2000); Barcelona Dragons (2001); Cleveland Browns (2001); Indianapolis Colts (2001); Houston Texans (2002)*; New York Giants (2002); Edmonton Eskimos (2004)*; BC Lions (2005–2007); Triangle Razorbacks (2010); Békéscsaba Raptors (2011); European American Challenge (2013)
- * Offseason or practice squad member only

Coaching
- Triangle Razorbacks (2010) (Wide receivers/special teams); Békéscsaba Raptors (2011) (Head coach/special teams); Elite Football League of India (2012) (Head coach/coaching consultant/offensive coordinator/defensive coordinator/special teams/strength and conditioning coach); Amstetten Thunder (2012) (Head coach/offensive coordinator/defensive coordinator/special teams/strength and conditioning coach); Cagliari Crusaders (2013) (Head coach/offensive coordinator/defensive coordinator/special teams/strength and conditioning coach); East Sao Paulo (2013) (Head coach/offensive coordinator/defensive coordinator/special teams/strength and conditioning coach); Kouvola Indians (2014) (Head coach/offensive coordinator/defensive coordinator/special teams/strength and conditioning coach); Briganti Napoli (2015) (Head coach/offensive coordinator/defensive coordinator/special teams/strength and conditioning coach); Bluefield College (2015) (Asst. WR/TE coach/Asst. strength and conditioning coach/special teams); Warsaw Sharks (2016) (Head coach/offensive coordinator/defensive coordinator/special teams/strength and conditioning coach); Moscow Patriots (2016) (Head coach/coaching consultant/special teams/strength and conditioning coach); Russian national team (2016) (Head coach/coaching consultant/offensive coordinator/strength and conditioning coach); Sao Paulo Spartans (2016) (Head coach/coaching consultant/offensive coordinator/defensive coordinator/strength and conditioning coach); Lausanne Owls (2017) (Head coach/offensive coordinator/defensive coordinator/special teams/strength and conditioning coach); Ezekiel Ansah Football Camp (2017) (Head camp director); Eidsvoll 1814s (2018) (Coaching consultant/offensive coordinator/defensive coordinator/strength and conditioning coach); Ezekiel Ansah Football Camp (2018) (Head camp director); Rosenheim Rebels (2018) (Coaching consultant/offensive coordinator/defensive coordinator/strength and conditioning coach); Eidsvoll 1814s (2019) (Coaching consultant/offensive coordinator/defensive coordinator/strength and conditioning coach); Melton Wolves (2019) (Head coach/coaching consultant/offensive coordinator/defensive coordinator/strength and conditioning coach); Cabo Marlins (2020) (Head coach/coaching consultant/offensive coordinator/strength and conditioning coach); Panthers Wrocław (2022) (Wide receivers); Dinos Saltillo (2023) (Offensive pass coordinator/wide receivers)

Awards and highlights
- Grey Cup champion (2006)

Career NFL statistics
- Receptions: 58
- Receiving yards: 998
- Receiving touchdowns: 6
- Stats at Pro Football Reference

Career CFL statistics
- Receptions: 34
- Receiving yards: 504
- Receiving touchdowns: 4
- Stats at CFL.ca (archived)

Tony De'Angelo Simmons (born December 8, 1974) is an American former professional football player who was a wide receiver in the National Football League (NFL). He played for the New England Patriots, Cleveland Browns, Indianapolis Colts, Houston Texans and New York Giants. He has also played for the Edmonton Eskimos, BC Lions of the Canadian Football League, Triangle Razorbacks in the National Ligaen in Denmark and for the Békéscsaba Raptors in the Hungarian American Football League.

Simmons has been a football coach for well over a decade, all over the world. In 2020, he was scheduled to be the head coach for the Cabo Marlins of the Fútbol Americano de México, but the season was ultimately canceled due to COVID.

In the 2022 European League of Football season he is the wide receiver coach of the Panthers Wrocław in Poland.

In the 2023 Mexican League of Football season (LFA) he is the wide receiver coach of the Dinos in Saltillo, Coahuila.

== Early life ==
Simmons attended St. Rita High School on Chicago's south side. In 1993, he was named Chicago Sun-Times Prep Athlete of the Year for his participation in both football and track. As a senior, Simmons won the state championship in the 100- and 200-meter dash events with times of 10.5 seconds and 21.58 seconds, respectively. He shares a distinction with two other NFL players who also attended both St. Rita and the University of Wisconsin–Madison: former high school and college teammate Ahmad Merritt, and former Chicago Bear Dennis Lick. Simmons and Merritt played against each other and caught touchdown passes in World Bowl IX. In April 2011, Simmons was inducted into the St. Rita High School Hall of Fame.

== College career ==
Simmons played college football at the University of Wisconsin–Madison. He left Wisconsin as the school's all-time leader in touchdown receptions with 23 (this record has since been broken by Lee Evans), earning him the nickname "Touchdown Tony" among the Camp Randall faithful. He also competed in track Wisconsin and he is a Big Ten 100m (10.15) and 200m (20.44) Champion. He was part of the 1995-1997 Triple Crown Champions (Cross Country, Indoor and Outdoor Track)

== Professional career ==
Pre-draft measurables
| Height | Weight | Arm length | Hand span | 40-yard dash | 10-yard split | 20-yard split | 20-yard shuttle | Three-cone drill | Vertical jump |
|---|---|---|---|---|---|---|---|---|---|
| 6 ft 0 3/4 in (1.85 m) | 203 lb (92 kg) | 33 1/4 in (0.84 m) | 10 1/2 in (0.27 m) | 4.35 s | 1.57 s | 2.60 s | 3.96 s | 7.15 s | 36.5 in (0.93 m) |

Simmons was selected into the NFL in the second round (52nd overall pick) of the 1998 NFL draft by the New England Patriots.

Simmons played five seasons as a pro with the New England Patriots, Cleveland Browns, Indianapolis Colts and New York Giants. He amassed 58 receptions for 998 yards with six touchdowns, averaging 20.8 receiving yards per game. Simmons also had 12 punt/kick returns for 241 yards, averaging 20.1 yards per return.

In 2001, Simmons starred for the regular-season champion Barcelona Dragons of NFL Europa. He finished the season with 32 catches for 538 yards and caught seven touchdowns.

Simmons played from 2004 to 2007 for the Edmonton Eskimos and BC Lions of the Canadian Football League (CFL). He recorded 34 receptions for 504 yards, averaging 14.8 yards with four touchdowns. The BC Lions won the 94th Grey Cup.

In 2010, Simmons played for the Triangle Razorbacks in Denmark National Ligaen. The Razorbacks reached Mermaid Bowl Danish championship game, losing to the Søllerød Gold Diggers with final score of 13–0. Simmons had 43 receptions and 8 touchdowns during the Razorbacks 10–0 regular season.

In January 2011, Simmons joined the Hungarian team Békéscsaba Raptors as a player and coach. The team played in the Hungarian American Football League (second division) and finished 2nd place.

== Coaching career ==
=== Denmark ===
In 2010, Simmons was an assistant coach with Danish team Triangle Razorbacks. The Razorbacks played in the Mermaid Bowl Danish championship game, losing to the Søllerød Gold Diggers with final score of 13–0.

=== Hungary ===
In January 2011, Simmons coached the Hungarian team Békéscsaba Raptors. The team reached the Hungarian American Football League second division Pannon Bowl and finished 2nd place.

=== India ===
In January 2012, Simmons joined the EFLI Elite Football of India to help develop coaches and players as a coaching consultant, coach, and referee in the first-ever American football played in India. He also served as offensive coordinator, defensive coordinator, special-teams coordinator, strength/speed coach, and referee.

=== Austria ===
In April 2012, Simmons joined the Austrian team Amstetten Thunder as head coach and helped coordinate the offense and defense. The Thunder played in Austria's second division below the Austrian Football League and reached the division 2 playoffs.

=== Italy ===
In January 2013, Simmons joined the Italian team Cagliari Crusaders as head coach. He also served as offensive coordinator, defensive coordinator, special-teams coordinator, and strength/speed coach.

=== Finland ===
Simmons agreed to a deal with the Kouvola Indians to serve as their offensive coordinator for the 2014 Maple League season. He also served as coaching consultant.

=== Italy ===
In January 2015, Simmons joined the Briganti Napoli to serve as their head coach in the Italian league second division below the Italian Football League. He also served as offensive coordinator, defensive coordinator, special-teams coordinator, and strength/speed coach.

=== United States ===
In July 2015, Simmons joined the Bluefield College Rams to serve as their receivers/tight end coach and assistant strength conditioning coach.

=== United States Reality TV Personality ===
In November 2015, Simmons joined the cast of American Grit an American reality television series starring WWE wrestler John Cena filmed at the foothills of Mount Rainier in Eatonville, Washington that premiered on Fox on April 14, 2016. Simmons finished third in the competition.

=== Poland ===
In January 2016, Simmons joined the Warsaw Sharks as head coach. He also served as offensive coordinator, defensive coordinator, special-teams coordinator, and strength/speed coach.

=== Russia ===
In May 2016, Simmons joined the Moscow Patriots as head coach. He also served as offensive coordinator, coaching consultant, special-teams coordinator, and strength/speed coach. The Patriots won the Russian American Football Championship with a perfect season. Simmons also served as the head coach, coaching consultant, offensive coordinator, and strength/speed coach for the Russia national American Football team.

=== Brazil ===
In October 2016, Simmons joined the São Paulo Spartans as head coach. He also served as offensive coordinator, defensive coordinator, special-teams coordinator, and strength/speed coach.

=== Switzerland ===
In January 2017, Simmons joined the Lausanne LUCAF Owls as head coach. The Owls played in the National League B (the second highest level league in Switzerland) below the Nationalliga A. The team finished in fourth place.

=== Ghana ===
In July 2017 and July 2018, Simmons was the Head Camp Director of the Ezekiel Ansah Football Camp. Ezekiel Ansah is a fellow NFL athlete. The 2-day inaugural Ezekiel Ansah Football Camp had more than 500 participants from various schools in the Accra metropolis. The students enjoyed lots of giveaways and had fun learning the game of football. The aim of the camp is to introduce a set of skills often used in the sport of American football while promoting the importance of physical education, teamwork, and demonstrating the discipline to work hard towards one's goals. The maiden Ezekiel Ansah Football Camp commenced on July 14, 2017, at the Presbyterian Senior Secondary Schools.

=== Norway ===
In January 2018 – July 2019, Simmons joined the Eidsvoll 1814s in the Norges Amerikanske Idretters Forbund as offensive coordinator and strength/speed coach. In 2018, he helped lead the Senior team to the playoffs and the U17 team to a championship. In 2019, he help lead the Senior team to a Runner-Up finish in the Championship and the U17 to a third-place finish.

=== Germany ===
In October 2018, Simmons joined the Rosenheim Rebels as the Team consultant. During his time with the Rebels, he developed and implemented recruiting camps, football skills camps, and sports performance training at Transformers Gymnasium for the city of Rosenheim. He helped develop with coaches the Rebels' new aggressive football playbooks and schemes. In the following season, the Rebels won there German regional league Championship which is a lower division of the German Football League

=== Australia ===
In July 2019, Simmons joined the Melton Wolves as head coach. He also served as offensive coordinator, defensive coordinator, special-teams coordinator, and strength/speed coach, recruiter, team manager, and sports consultant.

=== Mexico ===
In January 2020, Simmons joined the Cabo Marlins as its first head coach in its inaugural year in the Mexican Fútbol Americano de México (FAM). The season was cut short in March because of the COVID-19 pandemic. He also served as offensive coordinator, defensive coordinator, special-teams coordinator, and strength/speed coach, recruiter, team manager, and business consultant.

=== Poland ===
In 2022, Simmons signed as wide receivers coach for the Panthers Wrocław in the European League of Football.

=== Mexico ===
In 2023, Simmons signed as offensive pass coordinator and wide receivers coach for the Dinos Saltillo in the Liga de Futbol Americano.
