= David Cunningham (American football) =

American football coach

Current position
- Title: Offensive coordinator
- Team: Union Commonwealth
- Conference: AAC

Playing career
- 1983–1987: Kentucky Wesleyan
- 1988: Heathrow Jets
- 1991: Terassa Sticks
- 1993: Herlev Rebels

Coaching career (HC unless noted)
- 1992: Sue Bennett (assistant)
- 1993–1995: Kentucky Wesleyan (assistant)
- 1996–1997: Sue Bennett
- 1998–1999: Kentucky Wesleyan (DC)
- 2000–2001: McPherson (OC)
- 2001: Houston Thunderbears (DB)
- 2002–2006: McPherson
- 2007–2009: Nicholls State (ST)
- 2010–2013: Mississippi Valley State (ST/WR)
- 2014–2019: Minnesota State (RB)
- 2020: Cumberlands (RB/TE)
- 2021: Eastern Kentucky (DQC)
- 2022–2024: Georgetown (KY) (TE)
- 2025–present: Union Commonwealth (OC)

Head coaching record
- Overall: 24–26 (McPherson only)

David Cunningham is an American football coach and former player. He is the offensive coordinator for Union Commonwealth University, a position he has held since 2025.

Cunningham served as the head football coach at Sue Bennett College in London, Kentucky from 1996 to 1997 and McPherson College in McPherson, Kansas from 2002 to 2006.

== Playing career ==
Cunningham played college football at Kentucky Wesleyan as a linebacker from 1983 to 1987. After college, Cunningham played professionally in the European Football League (EFL) with the Heathrow Jets in 1988 of the BAFA National Leagues, Terassa Sticks (Spain)Liga Nacional de Fútbol Americano in 1991 and the Herlev Rebels members of the National Ligaen Denmark in 1993.

== Coaching career ==
From 1993 to 1995, Cunningham was an assistant coach at Kentucky Wesleyan. In 1996, Cunningham was hired as the head football coah at Sue Bennett College and served through the 1997 season. From 1998 to 1999, Cunningham returned to Kentucky Wesleyan as defensive coordinator. Starting in 2000 through the 2001 college season, Cunningham served as offensive coordinator at McPherson College in McPherson, Kansas. Also in 2001, Cunningham worked as defensive backs coach for the Houston Thunderbears in the Arena Football League (AFL).

In 2002, Cunningham was named the head football coach at McPherson College and served in that role for five seasons from 2002 to 2006. He compiled a record of 24–26. From 2007 to 2009, Cunningham was the special teams coordinator at Nicholls State. In 2010, he moved to Mississippi Valley State and during his tenure served as a wide receivers coach and also a special teams coordinator until 2013.

In 2014, Cunningham moved to Minnesota State and was quarterbacks coach. In 2015, he became running backs coach at Minnesota State.

== Head coaching record ==
Year	Team	Overall	Conference	Standing	Bowl/playoffs
McPherson Bulldogs (Kansas Collegiate Athletic Conference) (2002–2006)
2002	McPherson	6–4	5–4	T–3rd	
2003	McPherson	6–4	5–4	T–3rd	
2004	McPherson	4–6	4–5	T–6th	
2005	McPherson	5–5	4–5	T–5th	
2006	McPherson	3–7	3–6	6th	
McPherson:		24–26	21–24		
Total:		24–26			
