= J.R. Artozqui =

American football player (born 1987)

Profile
- Position: Quarterback

Personal information
- Born: April 10, 1987

Career information
- College: Doane

Career history
- 2010–2014: Copenhagen Towers

John Raymond Artozqui (born April 10, 1987) is an American former football quarterback for the Copenhagen Towers in the National Ligaen of the Danish American Football Federation. Artozqui graduated from Doane College in 2009. He played high school football for La Habra High School in Orange County, California.

== Doane College ==
After graduating from high school in 2005, Artozqui signed with Doane College Tigers in Crete, Nebraska, where he became starting quarterback for the Tigers NAIA-team in his first season. He appeared in nine games, passing for 857 yards and throwing five touchdowns, and rushing for another 4.

Returning as quarterback for another season in 2006. After losing the first games of the season- Artozqui won the first and only game of the season on October 28, 2006 when he led the Tigers to a 35-24 victory against Concordia University. Artozqui threw three TDs, passed for more than 250 yards and rushed for 118. Doane College ended the season with a 1-9 record. Artozqui played all 10 games and passed for 940 yards and 7 touchdowns.

In 2007, Artozqui appeared in 10 games, starting 7 as a junior. He completed 85 of 158 passing attempts for a total of 956 yards. He threw 4 TDs and 8 INTs. He rushed for 103 yards scoring one touchdown. Doane Tigers ended the season with a 4-6 record.

As a senior in 2008 he appeared in 8 games, starting 3. He completed 49 of 105 passing attempts for a total of 663 yards. He threw 6 TDs and 10 INTs. Playing through two injuries as a senior, he struggled to get back to his norm. His season was shortened due to these injuries. Doane Tigers ended the season with a 4-7 record.

In all Artozqui played 37 games for Doane College. He is the 6th leading passer in school history.

== Copenhagen Towers ==
After graduating Artozqui signed for the Danish club Copenhagen Towers for the 2010 season. After being held out for two games because of work permit issues, he started five games for Towers, all wins, before an injured shoulder ended his season. He was resigned for the following season.

Season 2011, Artozqui threw for over 3,000 yards, 35 touchdowns, and 10 interceptions. With 550 yards of rushing, and 11 rushing scores. He led the Towers to the semifinals, where they lost to the Triangle Razorbacks, 23-13.

Season 2012, Artozqui returned for his 3rd year, determined to lead the Towers to the Mermaid Bowl.

In 2013 Towers had a perfect 12-0 season and won the MB bowl. First ever undefeated team to make that feat. In 2014, Artozqui lead the Towers to its back to back Mermaid Bowl wins and a season playing in the Champions League.
