= Mark Cohen =

Mark Cohen may refer to:

- Mark Cohen (photographer) (born 1943), American street photographer
- Mark Cohen (Rent), fictional character
- Mark Cohen (cricketer) (born 1961), former Irish cricketer
- Mark Cohen (comedian), American comedian
- Mark Cohen (journalist) (1849–1928), New Zealand journalist, newspaper editor, educationalist and social reformer
- Mark Cohen (American footballer) (born 1970), British-American football player
- Mark B. Cohen (born 1949), Philadelphia judge and Pennsylvania State Representative
- Mark Howard Cohen (born 1955), Georgia attorney and United States District Judge
- Mark J. Cohen (1942–1999), American realtor, and collector of comic books and comic art, and cartoonists' agent and comic art dealer
- Mark Cohen (surgeon), Canadian laser eye surgeon
- Mark Nathan Cohen, American anthropologist
- Mark A. Cohen, American economist and legal scholar
- Mark R. Cohen (born 1943), American professor of Near Eastern Studies
- Mark S. Cohen (born 1956), American neuroscientist

== See also ==
- Marc Cohen, American radio presenter
- Marc Cohn (born 1959), American singer-songwriter
- Mark Cohon (born 1966), Canadian Football League commissioner
