= Amager Demons =

American football team from Denmark

- Founded: 2002
- League: National Ligaen
- Based in: Copenhagen, Denmark
- Stadium: Lucifers Backyard
- Colors: Royal Blue, Red and Black
- President: Henrik Pedersen
- Head coach: John Stevenson
- Championships: None
- founders: Peter Holm Hansen, Ruben Toft Sindal & Morten Teglsbo Jensen
- Website: www.amagerdemons.dk

The Amager Demons are an American football team from Tårnby in Copenhagen, Denmark. The club was founded in 2002 by Ruben Toft Sindal, Morten Teglsbo and Peter Hansen. Amager Demons are members of the Danish American Football Federation (DAFF).

In 2011 Amager Demons competed for the first time in the National Ligaen, the top division of American Football in Denmark. Despite winning only two games, both against Kronborg Knights, the team avoided relegation and won another season in National Ligaen in 2012.

== Recent seasons ==
Recent seasons of the club:

Year	Division	Finish	Games	W	D	L	Pct.	PF	PA	Postseason
2008	Division 1	4th	9	1	0	8	0.11	65	199	
2009	Division 1	4th	8	5	0	3	0.62	218	129	
2010	Division 1	1st	10	8	0	2	0.80	279	93	Won promotion
2011	National Ligaen (National Conference)	4th	10	2	0	8	0.20	76	371	
2012	National Ligaen (National Conference)									

== Youth teams ==
Amager Demons has youth teams for three age groups, Under-19, Under-16 and Under-14.
