= Mark Cohen (American football) =

British-American football player (born 1970)

No. 1
- Position: Wide receiver

Personal information
- Born: 1970 (age 55–56); Birmingham, England

Career information
- College: University of Birmingham

Career history
- Sutton Coldfield Royals; Birmingham Bulls; Coventry Jaguars; Birmingham Bulls; Herlev Rebels; Copenhagen Towers; Hanau Hawks; East City Giants; Coventry Cassidy Jets

Awards and highlights
- 2× National Champion; 1993 Birmingham Bulls Rookie of the Year; 1994 Birmingham Bulls Offensive Player of the Year; 1994 Birmingham Bulls Coaches' Player of the Year; 2006 Coventry Cassidy Jets Coaches' Player of the Year; 2008 Coventry Cassidy Jets Offensive Player of the Year; 2009 Coventry Cassidy Jets Offensive Player of the Year; 2010 Coventry Cassidy Jets Players' Player; BritballNow Hall of Fame; Birmingham Bulls Hall of Fame

Mark Cohen (born 1970) is an English former American football wide receiver who played in the British, Danish, German and Finnish leagues. He is considered by some as one of the best players in British history.

== Playing career ==
=== Early years ===
Although, the first game Cohen saw was the Birmingham Bulls against the Nottingham Hoods, he began his career as an 18 year old for the Sutton Royals, based in Sutton Coldfield after being invited by Royals running back Lee Wright.

In 1990, he left to join the Redditch Arrows, and after impressing there, moved to his hometown team, the Birmingham Bulls in 1991.

=== Birmingham Bulls ===
The first of Cohen's three stints at the Bulls was short lived. He found playing time scarce, largely due to a number of leading receivers, including Mike Price, standing ahead of him on the depth chart. After one season, he left to join the Coventry Jaguars.

Cohen returned to the Bulls in 1993 and was selected as Rookie of the Year. In 1994, he led the Bulls in receptions and yards, and was selected to play for the London Monarchs in the World League of American Football, which would later be known as NFL Europe. However, he did not end up playing in any games for the Monarchs.

In 1995, he was part of the Bulls national championship team that defeated the London Olympians 34–30 in Solihull, scoring a 50+ yard touchdown.

Cohen made a second appearance in a national championship game against the Olympians in 2000, but despite scoring three touchdowns on the day, the Bulls were defeated 34–26.

Before leaving the Bulls in the early 2000s, he set team records in total points, receiving yards and receiving touchdowns, and was inducted into the team Hall of Fame.

=== Coventry Jets ===
His first year at the team then known as the Coventry Jaguars was in 1992, after leaving local rivals, the Birmingham Bulls, to play under head coach Gerry McManus. During his time, he scored a receiving touchdown against his former team. However, after one season he returned to the Bulls.

After a long career at the Bulls, Cohen returned to the Jets in 2005, and during his first season back, totalled 1,246 receiving yards and 33 receiving touchdowns, which remains a British record for a single season.

In 2007, he was again on the losing side of a national championship game. Cohen scored another touchdown, thrown by quarterback Tim Spaull, but that was the Cassidy Jets' only score of the day, falling 14–6 to the London Blitz at the Don Valley Stadium.

In 2008, the Cassidy Jets got revenge, and Cohen got his second national championship, defeating the London Blitz 33–32 at the Keepmoat Stadium.

2009 saw yet another Jets-Blitz final at the Keepmoat Stadium, and Cohen scored Coventry's lone touchdown of the day, thrown by former Blitz quarterback, Stuart Franklin. The Jets fell 26–7.

After a career spanning 22 years, Cohen retired as a member of the Jets, and was awarded Players' Player of the Year in his final season.

=== London Monarchs ===
Cohen was selected to play for the London Monarchs during the 1995 season.

=== Europe ===
Cohen has played for the Herlev Rebels and Copenhagen Towers of the Danish National Ligaen, the Hanau Hawks of the German Football League and the East City Giants of the American Football Association of Finland.

== International career ==
Cohen is one of the most capped player in GB Lions history with 12 appearances and made his debut in a 22–0 win against Ireland in 1995, where he scored a 28-yard touchdown from Sheffield Spartans quarterback Ian Ure.

Cohen was instrumental in the GB Lions' 1997 European Nations Championship run, scoring a go-ahead 41 yard touchdown from Stuart Franklin in the dying seconds.

Cohen was selected for the final time against France in 2008, 13 years after his first call up.

== Coaching career ==
In 2006, Cohen was selected by head coach Phil DeMonte as a wide receivers coach for Team Ireland.

In 2010 and 2011, Cohen spent time as wide receiver coach and assistant offensive co-ordinator for former team, the Birmingham Bulls.

== Honours and records ==
Cohen holds a number of team and national records.

- Most Receptions in British History
- Most Receiving Yards in British History
- Most Receiving Touchdowns in British History
- Most Receiving Touchdowns (Single Season) in British History
- Most Total Points – Birmingham Bulls
- Most Receptions – Birmingham Bulls
- Most Receiving Yards – Birmingham Bulls
- Most Receiving Touchdowns – Birmingham Bulls
- Most Receiving Touchdowns – Coventry Jets

== Personal life ==
Cohen lives in Birmingham, and was married in 2007. He is a fan of the San Francisco 49ers.
