= Stefán =

Stefán is a common first name in Iceland.

According to Icelandic custom, people are generally referred to by first and middle names and patronyms are used if disambiguation is required.

Stefán is the Icelandic version of the Greek name Stephanos (English Stephen) with the original meaning being crown or wreath. The name is a frequently given name in Iceland. In 2002, it was ranked ninth after Kristján and before Jóhann.

Notable people so named include:

- Stefán Einarsson (1897–1972), Icelandic linguist and literary historian
- Stefán Gíslason (born 1980), Icelandic footballer and manager
- Stefán Hörður Grímsson (1919–2002), Icelandic writer
- Stefán Guðmundur Guðmundsson (1853–1927), original name of the Icelandic poet and farmer Stephan G. Stephansson
- Stefán Gunnarsson (born 1951), Icelandic handball player
- Stefán Arnar Gunnarsson (1978–2023), Icelandic handball coach
- Stefán Jón Hafstein (born 1955), Icelandic politician
- Stefán Hilmarsson (singer) (born 1966), Icelandic singer and translator
- Stefán Haukur Jóhannesson (born 1959), Icelandic diplomat
- Stefán Jónsson (handballer) (born 1944), Icelandic handball player
- Stefán Jónsson (water polo) (1918–2011), Icelandic water polo player
- Stefán Kristjánsson (1982–2018), Icelandic chess grandmaster
- Stefán Kristjánsson (alpine skier) (1924–1990), Icelandic alpine skier
- Stefán Logi Magnússon (born 1980), Icelandic footballer
- Stefán Ólafsson (c. 1618–1688), Icelandic churchman
- Stefán Ólafsson (scholar), Icelandic academic
- Stefán Sölvi Pétursson (born 1986), Icelandic strongman competitor
- Stefán Ingi Sigurðarson (born 2001), Icelandic footballer
- Stefán Sigurðsson (1887–1933), Icelandic poet
- Stefán Örn Sigurðsson (born 1954), Icelandic footballer
- Stefán Rafn Sigurmannsson (born 1990), Icelandic handball player
- Stefán Jóhann Stefánsson (1894–1980), Prime Minister of Iceland
- Stefán Karl Stefánsson (1975–2018), Icelandic actor and singer
- Stefán Númi Stefánsson (born 1995), Icelandic player of American football
- Stefán Vagn Stefánsson (born 1972), Icelandic politician
- Stefán Karel Torfason (born 1994), Icelandic strongman competitor and powerlifter
- Stefán Þórarinsson (1754–1823), Icelandic magistrate and lawyer
- Stefán Þórðarson (born 1975), Icelandic footballer
- Stefán Teitur Þórðarson (born 1998), Icelandic footballer

== See also ==
- Stefan (given name)
