= Stefán Númi Stefánsson =

Icelandic gridiron football player (born 1995)

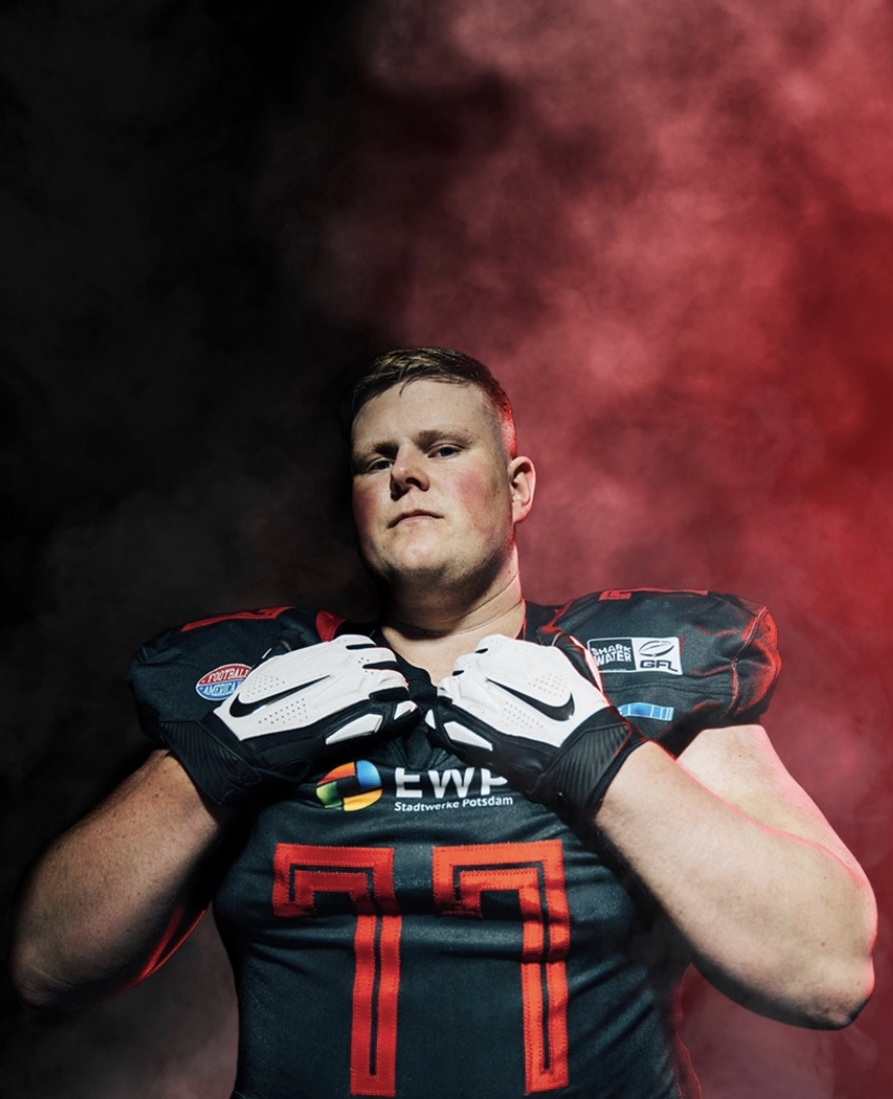

No. 78 – Nordic Storm
- Position: Offensive tackle
- Roster status: Active

Personal information
- Born: August 1, 1995 (age 31); Egilsstaðir, Iceland
- Listed height: 6 ft 5 in (1.96 m)
- Listed weight: 313 lb (142 kg)

Career history
- Aarhus Tigers (2019/2020); Mallorca Voltors (2020); Swarco Raiders (2021); Potsdam Royals (2022–2023); Helvetic Mercenaries (2024); Nordic Storm (2025-present)

Awards and highlights
- German Football League – North division: 2022; Austrian Bowl (2021)

Stefán Númi Stefánsson (born 1 August 1995) is an Icelandic professional American football player, where he plays as an offensive tackle for Nordic Storm in the European League of Football. Stefán is also a former basketball player.

== Early life ==
Stefán grew up in Egilsstaðir, Iceland, where he played basketball for Höttur for several seasons, including in the Icelandic top-tier Úrvalsdeild karla. He won the second-tier 1. deild karla with Höttur in 2015.

== Football career ==
Before starting his professional American football career, he played for the offensive line of the Sønderborg Sergeants in southern Denmark. He quickly turned out to be amongst the most talented players on the team and began preparing for his professional career.

He started his professional American football career in Denmark with Aarhus Tigers in 2019 in the National Ligaen. He signed with Mallorca Voltors in Spain for the 2020 season. The season was cut short due to the COVID-19 pandemic in Spain. Stefán went back to play with Aarhus Tigers in summer of 2020 but before the season could finish, Covid unfortunately shut down the league.

In 2021, he played for Swarco Raiders and helped the team win the Austrian Bowl.

In April 2022, Stefán signed with the Potsdam Royals of the German Football League. Potsdam Royals went through the 2022 regular season undefeated 10-0. The team won both their quarterfinal game vs. Straubing Spiders and the semifinal game vs. Cologne Crocodiles. Royals played for the first time in the team history, on 22 October 2022, in the German Bowl where they faced the five time champions Schwäbisch Hall Unicorns. Unicorns won the game 44–27.

== Trophies and awards ==
=== American football ===
- Austrian Football League: 2021
- German Football League – North division: 2022

=== Basketball ===
- 1. deild karla: 2015
