= Cabo Marlins =

Mexican American football team

- Established: 2020
- Folded: 2022
- Based in: Cabo San Lucas, Baja California Sur, Mexico
- Home field: Estadio Complejo Deportivo Don Koll
- League: Fútbol Americano de México

Personnel
- Head coach: César Martínez
- Website: www.cabomarlins.com

The Cabo Marlins were an American football team based in Cabo San Lucas, Baja California Sur, Mexico. The Marlins competed in Fútbol Americano de México (FAM). The team was founded in 2020 and played their home games at Don Koll Stadium in Cabo San Lucas. The Marlins were the first professional American football team in the state. Their local fans are referred to as the "Marlins Mania".

For the 2020 season, the team signed former NFL player Tony Simmons to be the inaugural head coach. For the 2021 season, they hired César Martínez as their head coach and signed Darryl Render as defensive end, who was Aaron Donald's replacement at Pittsburgh. The 2020 and 2021 seasons were ultimately cut short by the COVID-19 pandemic.

For the 2022 season, the Cabo Marlins made key acquisitions by signing former NFL starting running back Antonio Andrews and former Iowa State defensive lineman Kamilo Tongamoa. Their roster consists of 48 players, of which 16 are allowed to be international (non-Mexican), and up to 10 practice squad players.

The Marlins defeated the Sharks de Costa Rica 22–18 in a preseason scrimmage in April 2022, becoming the first FAM team to play against a non-Mexican team. The team lost the first two games of the regular season before achieving its historic first win over the Pioneros de Querétaro at home. The Marlins finished the season with a 6–2 record.

After the dissolution of FAM in September 2022, the Marlins expressed interest in joining the Liga de Fútbol Americano Profesional, the top league in Mexico. However, they were ultimately left without a league.

The Cabo Marlins were the subject of an independent documentary following Trevor Hillis' journey quitting his job at Google to play professional football, despite having never played the sport before. The documentary premiered at Big Apple Film Festival at Cinema Village in New York City on November 4, 2023.
