= Coventry Jets =

Former American Football team based in the United Kingdom (2004–2018)

- Sport: American football
- Founded: 1985 reformed in 2004
- Folded: 2018
- League: BAFA National Leagues
- Team history: Warwickshire Bears (1985); Coventry Bears (1986); CMK Bucks (1987); Coventry Bears (1988–1990); Coventry Jaguars (1990–1993, 2004); Coventry Jets (2005–2018)
- Based in: Coventry, England
- Stadium: Nutbrook Ave, Coventry CV4 9PW
- Colors: Navy Blue and White
- Head coach: Sam Kendall
- General manager: Natalie Brookhouse
- League titles: 1991, 2005, 2006, 2008
- Division titles: 1991, 2005, 2006, 2008
- Playoff berths: 1986, 1991, 1992, 2005, 2006, 2007, 2008, 2009, 2010, 2014
- Conference titles: 1986, 1991, 2005, 2006
- BritBowl titles: 2008
- Overall record: 118–61–1
- European ranking: unranked

The Coventry Jets were an American football team based in Coventry, England.The club ceased to exist in 2018 and dropped out of the BAFA National Leagues with all club assets and teams being moved over to the Etone Jaguars based in Nuneaton, Warwickshire.

The Jets were first established and named as the Bears in 1985 and merged in 1991 with the Walsall Titans. After a couple other name changes the Jets were reformed in 2004 and have competed in six BAFANL bowl games, including four consecutive BritBowl appearances from 2007 to 2010 and a BritBowl championship in 2008.

== History ==
=== Origins ===
The first American football team in Coventry was the Warwickshire Bears, who were formed in February 1984 by two local men with assistance from the head coach of a United States Air Force team located at RAF Chicksands. The Bears played their inaugural season in the Midland Division of the British American Football League (BAFL), recording only one regular-season victory. However, the Bears were more successful in friendly games, with their best result coming when they travelled to London to take on the undefeated and eventual Summer Bowl finalist Streatham Olympians and won 26–0. In 1986, the Bears played in and won the Anglo Conference Central Division with an 8–2 record, including a BAFL record 100–0 victory over the Black Country Nailers. The Bears also hosted a Norwegian team, the Oslo Trolls, losing by one point on the last kick of the game. The following year, in an effort to improve their overall talent level, the Bears merged with the Milton Keynes team and formed the CMK Bucks. However, the merger did not work, and the team folded losing a lot of talent to neighbouring teams, such talent as Von Sheppard (University of Nebraska–Lincoln) who played for the Titans from 1988–1990.

The team was reformed as the Coventry Bears, and at the end of the 1990 season they completed a successful merger with the Walsall Titans and formed to become the (Coventry Jaguars). The Jaguars imported two American players; quarterback Travis Hunter from East Carolina University and tight end Craig Otto from the University of Minnesota. The influx of talent led to the Jaguars finishing 10–0 in 1991 and winning the National Division Managements Association (NDMA) Division II Coca-Cola Bowl. They also had a notable win over the Upper Heyford Sky Kings, a United States Air Forces in Europe (USAFE) team and reigning USAFE champions.

In 1992, Hunter left the Jaguars for the rival Birmingham Bulls, but Mark Cohen, who would also play in NFL Europe, joined the Jaguars. They once again defeated the Sky Kings, this time on their airbase, but the Jaguars' lost to the Kent Mustangs in the league semi-finals, and then narrowly lost to the defending champion Bulls in the third place game.

The Jaguars played in the NDMA Division I during the 1993 season, with games against the Birmingham Bulls, the Glasgow Lions, the Nottingham Hoods, the Leicester Panthers, the Northants Storm and the London Olympians. Expectations were high for the Jaguars, as they had signed quarterback and former Cleveland Browns draft pick Clemente Gordon, line-backer Steve Donlin from the Toronto Argonauts and head coach Bruno Waldner who was a former assistant with the Minnesota Vikings. However, the Jaguars lost their first game, 14–6, at the Bulls and would then lose 44–8 at home against the reigning champion Olympians. Gordon and Donlin both returned to the United States so the Jaguars had to use an untried quarterback Jamie Kilby for the last part of the season. The Jaguars then suffered additional key losses throughout the season, which led to the team folding at the end of the season.

=== Formation and inaugural season ===
In 2003, American football returned to Coventry when former Jaguars and Bulls quarterback Jamie Kilby had the idea to resurrect the Coventry Jaguars team. Gerry McManus, and former Jaguars and Bulls player Jon McNulty, joined Kilby in recruiting coaches for the team. They were successful in recruiting former player Paul Newey, and brought Dave Cowan and Karl Burgess out of retirement. They also recruited four players (Ant Ridgway, Greg Williams, James Hossack and Owain Davies) from the Loughborough Aces, a local British Universities American Football League (BUAFL) team. Two American running backs (RB) also joined Coventry the team.

The rest of the team was made up of local rookie players, however the Jaguars were competitive against all of their opponents in their inaugural season. In the Jaguars' first ever game, they lost 13–7 to the Oxford Saints and scored in all but one game. Throughout the season, the Jaguars recruited more players. American import Quarterback Tim Spaull replaced Kilby, and wide receiver (WR) Mark Cohen returned to Coventry after a prior stint with the original Jaguars as well as NFL Europe. The season highlights included: the team's first touchdown, which was fittingly scored by Jon McNulty on a completed pass from Jamie Kilby; a game against the South Wales Warriors, where they lost 60–32 but set a team record for highest combined score; and that the Jaguars had three players on the Great Britain national American football team roster when they qualified for the 2005 European Championship of American football.

After the Jaguar's first season, it was clear that progress needed to be made on the field. Off the field, however, the team was already quite successful. They led the league in attendance with an average of 500 spectators, secured sponsorships from Coventry Aquatics and Fitness First, and were gaining media attention.

During the offseason, the Jaguars rebranded as the Coventry Jets when it was announced that a Jaguar car plant in Coventry would be closing. While the team had no association with the Jaguar car brand, they wanted to distance themselves from the controversy. The Jets name was chosen to honour Sir Frank Whittle who lived in the city and invented the jet engine.

=== 2005 season ===
In 2005, the Jets signed many new players including national team running backs Steve Coles and Tony Perkins and national team quarterback Adam Lane. John and Lester Hopewell, both offensive guards, upgraded the offensive line and brought with them the experience of playing in Eurobowl with the Bergamo Lions. Defensively the Jets upgraded all areas. Bernie Hacksaw and Paul Rickhuss arrived on the defensive line, an area of concern the previous year with many linemen playing both ways. The Jets benefited from the unfortunate end of Nene Valley Hybrids and picked up line-backers (LB) Steve Booth and Gary Royer and defensive back (DB) Wayne Gumbs, all of whom played a major role during the season. More players arrived from Loughborough Aces and local BUAFL team Warwick Wolves. The newly opened Butts Arena became the Jets home stadium for the season.

The team won every match they played in 2005, and nearly went the entire season without conceding a point until during the final game Norwich Devils QB Lance Buckingham hit WR Ben Green on a deep ball which went for a TD, the Jets however went 10–0, breaking several records on the way. In the playoffs, the Jets played the Dundee Hurricanes, beating a spirited squad 35–0. This set up a huge semi-final clash against the West Coast Trojans, the most anticipated game of 2005. In front of 1500 people, the Jets drew first blood, returning the opening kick-off for a touchdown (TD). The Trojans replied straight away, working their way downfield with GB Lions WR Mark Squire scoring. This was the only time they threatened the Jets end zone. The Trojans defence were manhandled by the Jets front five; RBs Coles and Perkins found huge holes in the Trojans defence. Quarterback (QB) Spaull had all the time he needed to pick apart their secondary, finding GB Lions pair Cohen and Tam Byrne for TDs before half time (HT), the Jets leading 41–7. The Trojans were done, they were beaten by a combination of aggression, power, speed and skill. QB McNey was sacked nine times in the first half alone. The game finished 55–7, the Jets rotating the whole squad and easing up in the second half. Their win meant that they were promoted for the 2006 season. They had one goal left, however, the division championship against the Kent Exiles, also undefeated.

The Jets got the first score on the board, QB Spaull finding Cohen. After that, the Exiles took control of the game, scoring 20 unanswered points. Trailing 20–7 at the half, a spirited fightback from the Jets looked to have swung the game in their direction, taking the lead 24–20 but a bomb from Exiles' QB Matt Duncan beat the coverage and put Kent up 26–24. On the following KO, however, Tony Perkins returned the ball all the way, not only sealing a 30–26 win for the Jets but the MVP trophy in what will go down as one of the best finals in Britball history.

=== 2006 season ===
2006 was another notable season for the Jets. A the start of the season, they were sponsored by international property development company Cassidy Group, who had just become the main sponsors of Coventry City FC and the Coventry Blaze. The club attracted some of the top British players in the BAFL to Coventry. The signings of Jeremy Simms (London Olympians), Will White, Mick Mills Neil Edwards and Mike Dunson (Personal Assurance Knights) made the Jets a top team in the BAFL. They were joined by former Sioux Falls Cougar QB Joe Wright and former St. Ambrose Fighting Bee Centre (C) Kurt Gersch. Links were also established with local BUAFL team Leicester Longhorns. Defensive end (DE) Andy Steadman, LB Xin Xu and WR Nathan Dobson signed for the Jets.

In preseason, the Jets travelled to Bergamo, Italy for a weekend training camp. Their hosts for the camp were the Bergamo Lions, perennial Italian Super Bowl champions and three-time Eurobowl winners. There was a joint training session and a controlled scrimmage. This was a tough test for the Jets. Bergamo boasted a roster with 17 North American players with NCAA or Canadian Interuniversity Sport (CIS) experience and were led by former BYU QB Kevin Feterik. It was also while the Jets were in Italy that links were made with New Zealand's Papatoetoe Wildcats. Their attention now turned to the upcoming league season.

Opening against Staffordshire Surge, the Jets won 39–0 in difficult conditions. Next up were local rivals Birmingham Bulls. The Bulls were a division above the Jets and came into the game full of confidence. However, the Jets were just too powerful for the Bulls, and won 27–0. After this they registered back to back 10–0 seasons. The Kent Exiles stood before the Jets in the BAFL Div 1A semi final. There was no repeat of the 2005 Div 2 Final—the Jets destroyed Kent 63–18. In the final, they met the Bristol Aztecs, who had overcome Ipswich 20–7. RB Tony Perkins took the ball down the field for a TD on the opening drive. The Jets scored three TDs in the first quarter alone. The game finished 52–20 securing promotion to BAFL Div 1.

=== 2007 season ===
The 2007 season started well for the Jets. In preseason, they travelled to Milan to take part in the Milano Bowl II, facing the Milan Rhinos. The game was an early season test and the Jets won 49–0 in their first away European game. This was their first time entering a European competition, taking a place in the EFAF Cup. They beat Rivas Osos in their first EFAF Cup game convincingly in front of 1000 spectators at Manor Park, a game which was scheduled to be played at the Ricoh Arena, to open their season. On 6 May 2007, the Ricoh Arena hosted its inaugural American Football game. In front of a record 2000 fans, the Jets beat the reigning BritBowl champions London Olympians 27–20. In between these games, the Jets had played their local rivals, the Birmingham Bulls, and won convincingly 42–0. This game again drew a large crowd, totalling just over 1000 spectators (known by the team as the 'Jets Faithful'). With attendances from the first four home games standing at just over 4,200.

The season would, however, end in disappointment. On 19 August, the Jets suffered their first domestic defeat in three years at the hands of the London Blitz, losing 28–24. This meant that the Jets finished second in the inaugural BAFL Premier division. The Jets again headed to Sheffield, having overcome the Bristol Aztecs in a hard-fought 13–7 battle. They were up against the Blitz, who had beaten previous perennial champions London Olympians twice in as many weeks, and lost 14–6.

=== 2008 season ===
The 2008 season saw the Jets compete in the European Football League, the top tier of European American Football as well as their domestic duties within BAFL. There were already some significant changes. Coaches Athersmith, Mitchell, Zerr and Barnes joined the squad. Coach Athersmith is the current head coach of BUAFL side Birmingham Lions and worked as an offensive coordinator with the GB Lions and GB Bulldogs. Coach Mitchell was the head coach of the Ipswich Cardinals, who were finalists in the 2007 D1 Finals and has been a coach on 2 British National Championship teams, 2001 Ipswich Cardinals and the 2004 Farnham Knights. He was also a member of the Knights coaching staff in the 2004 EFAF Cup Final loss to Swarco Raiders Tirol of the Austrian Football League. Coach Zerr, a Saskatoon native, took over as Defensive Coordinator for the 2008 season. Coach Zerr was a member of the Saskatoon Hilltops (CJFL) in 1996, who won a national Canadian Junior Football League championship in Canada and has nine years' experience coaching Canadian high school level football. Coach Barnes is a former wide receiver with the Michigan Wolverines and has 10 years experience as head coach at the high school level in the United States.

Offensively the team welcomed back receivers Dom Olney, Nathan Dobson, Mark Cohen, Jeremy Simms, Joe Black and James Hossack along with new addition David Sonne, a Canadian national from the Bristol Aztecs to forge arguably the strongest WR corps in the BAFL. Competing for the QB role this year were Neil Balthazaar, Stu Ennis, and Dax Michelena. Balthazaar, a Canadian national and graduate from the University of Guelph played for the Aztecs last season where he led the team to a 5–4–1 record and a place in the BAFL Premier semi-final. A three-time Region of Peel All-Star and Canadian All-East Star faced the Jets twice in 2007, losing both games including a narrow loss to the Jets in the BAFL Premier semi-final. Ennis is a British QB and is regarded as one of the best in the UK. He previously played for the Birmingham Bulls and local BUAFL Birmingham Lions, where he set many team and league passing records. He has led the Bulls and Lions into the playoffs in their respective divisions before and won the BUAFL championship with the Lions. He is a talented athlete who may figure at free safety as well as QB. Dax Michelena, an American national, previously played for Eidsvoll 1814s in Norway, where he led them to the Eurobowl quarter-final and the Norwegian championship. He has previously played in France, Sweden and Germany. He is a graduate of the University of Sioux Falls, where he was the starting QB and still holds many school records.

== Teams ==
=== Senior team ===
The Jets have been able to attract players from all over the Midlands and indeed England. Many of the original 2004 squad did not return for the 2005 season, an indication of how tough 2004 was for the team. The Jets have had some success developing players. James Hossacks, Dom Olney and Michael Achola all received invitations to NFLE National testing days in 2005. Achola, Andy Steadman and Xin Xu were invited to NFLE training camps in 2006 and 2007. Andy Steadman went on to become a member of the NFL International Player Development squad. 2007 Centre Tyla Matia, fresh from winning the 2008 New Zealand Championship with his hometown club and Jets New Zealand partner team Papatoetoe Wildcats, was signed by Rio Grande Valley Dorados, an af2 team for the 2008 season. There have also been links with BUAFL teams before, with Jets personnel coaching with the Warwick Wolves, Birmingham Lions, Oxford Cavaliers, Leicester Longhorns, Loughborough Aces and the newly formed Liverpool Fury and Coventry University Jets. The senior Jets currently train at the University of Warwick Sports Centre, using their 3G Tarkett pitch.

=== Adult flag team ===
In 2008, Adam Etheridge established the Coventry Jets Flag Team. The team proved to be very competitive in their first year of competition and were able to attract new people to the sport while being supported by the Jets main squad. WRs Mark Cohen and David Sonne, RB Shad McCook, QB Neil Balthazaar and FS Brian Over have all featured, helping the flag team become one of the forces of the newly formed BAFL Flag league.

=== Youth team ===
Formed by Jamie Kilby and Jon McNulty in 2006, the youth team allows 16–18-year-olds the chance to play, coached by former Jets players such as Chris Hartley and Karl Burgess as an assistant coach. They were undefeated in their first three five-a-side games, having tied 18–18 in their first ever game against the Bath Cardinals and beating Chester Romans twice. At the end of 2006, Shadrach McCook, youth team RB, made the Team England squad for their annual game against Team Scotland as a WR, some achievement for a player who was yet to play a full game. In 2008, four former youth players made the step up to the senior squad — Shadrach McCook, Richard Morrell, Hallam Reid and Andrew MacKenzie, while Rob Shaw signed with the newly formed Leicester Falcons. At the start of the 2010 season, the Youth team named Sam Knight as Team Captain, Joe Brammer Offense Captain, Matt Gough "Goughy" as Linemem Captain, Tinashe 'Tj' Chieza as Defense Captain, and Paul Romaniuk as Special Teams Captain. This 2010 season brought a wealth of new players, including quarterback Joe Brammer from Texas. The Jets youth team later joined the BAFL League playing in the West Midlands Conference.

=== Junior team ===
At the start of the 2011 school year, a new junior team for 14–16-year-olds was formed at the Woodlands School, an all-boys comprehensive school in Coventry. The school has a strong sporting tradition in the city, regularly turning out champion rugby teams not just at the Coventry school level but across the Midlands as well and can count Rugby World Cup winners Neil Back and Danny Grewcock as former pupils. The teams, known as the Woodlands Wolves and Woodlands Wolverines, train three times a week, more than most BAFL and BUAFL teams.

== Rivals ==
=== Birmingham Bulls ===
The Birmingham Bulls, being the closest team to the Jets, were fated rivals the moment they met. The first meeting took place on 28 May 2006 in Coventry, with the Jets comfortably winning 27–0. In the following season, the Bulls did not fare any better, losing 42–0 in Nuneaton and 52–12 in Birmingham. In 2008, the Bulls travelled to Coventry full of confidence. However, the Jets were keen on setting the tone for the season, winning 67–0 in what is the Bulls' biggest defeat in their 25-year history. The rivalry was renewed in 2010, with the Bulls youth and Jets youth facing each other. Both contests were close, the Jets edging one 28–24 while the Bulls also won with a 30–24 score-line.

=== Bristol Aztecs ===
The rivalry with the Bristol Aztecs came about following banter traded between players in the build-up to the 2006 BAFL Div 1 Bowl game. Both sides are big and physical teams and there was no love lost on the pitch between the two sides. But the Jets treated the Aztecs to an overwhelming defeat, winning 52–20. Since that game, the banter has continued between the two sides and there is a great amount of respect between the players of each squad. In 2007, the Jets again got the better of the Aztecs, winning 47–23 in Bristol and again 13–6 in the BAFL Premier semi final in Nuneaton. In 2008, a bad-tempered and physical game in Coventry, the Jets beat the Aztecs 28–15 and again in the semi-finals 31–28. In 2009, the Jets were once again victorious early in the season but suffered their first lost to Bristol, going down 40–33. They lost in the 2009 national semi-final 28–14 for a third consecutive year. In 2010, they continued their recent fortune in the regular season, recording two victories but once again going down in the semi-final, 34–8.

=== London Blitz ===
Not a local rivalry, but the Jets and London Blitz have brutal affairs nonetheless. Players and coaches on both teams have a huge amount of respect for each organisation. The Blitz ended the Jets unbeaten streak at Finsbury Park with a 28–24 win in August 2007. They were to meet again in the Britbowl where the Blitz again came out on top, 14–6. As a mark of respect, the majority of the Jets players waited on the field for the Blitz squad to collect the winner's trophy before heading to the changing rooms, and the Jets Head Coach handed his opposite number a bottle of champagne to celebrate with. The Jets got their revenge in 2008 with a dominating performance, winning 41–15 to face the defending champions in Britbowl XXII. In 2009, the Blitz and Jets once again met in the Britbowl final with the Blitz taking back the Boston Trophy to London. The 2010 BAFA CL National final will once again be competed by both clubs, with the Jets looking to repeat the 2008 success.

== Records ==
=== Season-by-season record ===
==== BAFL ====
Season	W	L	T	%	Scored	Conceded	Finish	Playoff results
Warwickshire Bears
1985	1	11	0	0.080	–	–	7th AFL Midlands Div	–
Coventry Bears
1986	8	2	0	0.800	338	82	1st BAFL Anglo Central	Lost preliminary round Luton Flyers 43–14
CMK Bucks
1987	5	5	0	0.500	209	267	3rd Budweiser National League Eastern	–
Coventry Bears
1988	5	3	2	0.600	170	128	3rd Budweiser Premier Div East Mids	–
1989	2	8	0	0.200	100	205	4th CGL Crown Div Central	–
1990	2	8	0	0.200	153	246	4th NCMMA Central	–
Coventry Jaguars
1991	10	0	0	1.000	500	104	1st NDMA Div 2 Northern	Won semi-final (West London Aces) 36–26; Won Final (Cardiff Mets) 52–28
1992	5	3	0	0.600	118	122	2nd NDMA Div 2 Northern	Lost semi-final (Kent Mustangs) 18–6
1993	0	7	0	0.000	26	172	6th NDMA Central Conference	–
2004	0	8	1	0.056	90	264	6th BSL Div 2 South-West	–
Coventry Jets
2005	10	0	0	1.000	610	7	1st BAFL Div 2 Central	Won quarter-final (Dundee Hurricanes) 35–0; Won semi-final (West Coast Trojans) 55–6; Won Final (Kent Exiles) 30–26
Coventry Cassidy Jets
2006	10	0	0	1.000	418	21	1st BAFL Div 1a North	Won semi-final (Kent Exiles) 63–18; Won Final (Bristol Aztecs) 52–20
2007	9	1	0	0.900	414	130	2nd BAFL Premier	Won semi-final (Bristol Aztecs) 13–6; Lost Britbowl (London Blitz) 14–6
2008	8	0	0	1.000	266	64	1st BAFL Premier	Won semi-final (Bristol Aztecs) 31–28; Won Britbowl (London Blitz) 33–32
Totals	75	56	3	0.570	3412	1812		

==== Europe ====
Season	W	L	T	%	Scored	Conceded	Stage	Euro Ranking
EFAF Cup
2007	1	1	0	0.500	58	44	Group Stage	15th
Eurobowl
2008	2	1	0	0.666	77	78	Lost quarter-final (Swarco Raiders Tirol) 49–20	7th
Totals	3	2	0	0.600	135	122		

=== Team records ===
- 3rd longest winning streak in British American football history, 32 domestic games (2005–2007)
- 4th Highest average points scored, 61.0, 2005
- 5th Most points scored in a season, 610, 2005
- 3rd Least points conceded in a season, 7, 2005
- 7th Least points conceded in a season, 21, 2006

=== Team honours ===
- BAFL Britbowl Champions, 2008
- BAFL Premier Division Champions, 2008
- BAFL Britbowl Finalist, 2007, 2009, 2010
- Milano Bowl Champions, 2007
- Nominated for Sports Team of the Year by Coventry, Solihull and Warwickshire Sports Awards, 2007
- Nominated for Sports Team of the Year by Coventry, Solihull and Warwickshire Sports Awards, 2006
- Cassidy Bowl Champions, 2006
- BAFL 1A Champions, 2006
- BAFL 1A North Conference Champions, 2006
- BAFL 2 Champions, 2005
- BAFL 2 North Champions
- BAFL 2 Central Conference Champions, 2005

== Playing staff ==
=== Offensive individual records ===
- 1st TD Catches in A Season, WR Mark Cohen, 33.
- Joint 7th Longest Reception, WR Mark Cohen, 94 yds vs East Kilbride Pirates, 15 July 2007.
- 8th Longest Field Goal, RB/K Steve Coles, 53 yds vs London Blitz, 19 August 2007.
- 9th Most Yards Receiving in 1 Game, WR Mark Cohen, 240yds, 2007.
- 10th Most Yards Receiving in 1 Game, WR Mark Cohen, 228yds, 2005.
- 10th Most TD Passes in 1 Game, QB Tim Spaull, 7, 2005.

=== Defensive individual records ===
- Joint 1st Most Interceptions in A Game, DB Mike Dunson, 4 vs East Kilbride Pirates, 11 June 2006.

=== Individual club honours ===
WR Tom Singleton-Wells selected for GB Lions Student squad, 2012.
OL Krishan Sharma (also 2012), WR Alex Preece and LB Oli Campbell selected for GB Lions junior squad for 2011 European Championships.
WR/SS David Saul selected for GB Lions for 2010 European Championships.
Youth QB Joe Brammer selected for GB Lions Youth squad, 2010.
DB Adam Biggs selected for GB Lions vs Centre College, 2010.
LB Gary Clark selected for GB Lions vs Australia and Sweden, 2009.
WRs Mark Cohen, Jeremy Simms, Joe Black and James Hossacks selected for GB Lions vs France, 2008.
QB Tim Spaull BAFL MVP, 2007.
DT Quinton Little nominated for BAFL Rookie of the Year, 2007.
C Tyler Matia signed by af2 Rio Grande Valley Dorados, 2007.
DE Andy Steadman invited to NFL International Player Development camps, 2007, 2008.
DB Danny Wardell attended NCAA Div 2 College, Southwest Minnesota State University, Redshirted, 2007.
HC Gerry McManus named Coventry, Solihull and Warwickshire Sports Awards Manager/Coach of the Year, 2006.
TE/DE Michael Achola, DE Andy Steadman and LB Xin Xu selected for NFLE National Player testing, 2006.
RB Shadrach McCook selected for Team England vs Team Scotland, Edinburgh, 2006.
HC Gerry McManus named BAFCA Coach of the Year, 2005.
TE/DE Michael Achola, WRs James Hossacks and Dom Olney selected for NFLE National Player testing, 2005.
LB Parm Sidhu nominated for BAFL Rookie of the Year, 2005.
LB Paul Newey, WR Mark Cohen and RB Steve Coles selected as GB Lions captains vs Centre College, London, 2005.
LB Paul Newey, WR Mark Cohen, WR Tam Byrne, RB Steve Coles, DL Saul Freer and DL Bernie Hacksaw all selected for GB Lions Euro Championships, Finland, 2005.
LB Paul Newey, WR Mark Cohen, DB Adam Biggs and QB Jamie Kilby all selected for GB Lions, winning the Group B Euro Championships, France, 2004.

== Coaching staff ==
=== Senior team coaches ===
Name	Position
Sam Kendall	Head coach
Sam Kendall	Offensive Co-Ordinator
Danny Smith	Defensive Co-Ordinator
Josh Kelly	Defensive Line
Lewis Thomas	Offensive Line
Sam Johns	Linebackers Coach
Elliot Strong	Defensive Backs
