= Clemente Gordon =

American football player (born 1967)

No. 10
- Position: Quarterback

Personal information
- Born: August 14, 1967 (age 59)
- Listed height: 6 ft 4 in (1.93 m)
- Listed weight: 245 lb (111 kg)

Career information
- College: Grambling State (1986–1989)
- NFL draft: 1990: 11th round, 296th overall pick

Career history
- Cleveland Browns (1990)*; Dallas Cowboys (1990)*; Orlando Thunder (1991); Cincinnati Rockers (1992); Coventry Jaguars (1993); Miami Hooters (1993–1994); Connecticut Coyotes (1995); Charlotte Rage (1996); Florida Bobcats (1997–2000)
- * Offseason or practice squad member only

Career AFL statistics
- Comp. / Att.: 209 / 435
- Passing yards: 2,329
- TD–INT: 37–12
- Passer rating: 74.20
- Rushing TDs: 5
- Stats at ArenaFan.com

Clemente J. Gordon (born August 14, 1967) is an American former professional football quarterback who played eight seasons in the Arena Football League (AFL) with the Cincinnati Rockers, Miami Hooters, Connecticut Coyotes, Charlotte Rage and Florida Bobcats. He was selected by the Cleveland Browns of the National Football League (NFL) in the 11th round of the 1990 NFL draft after playing college football at Grambling State University.

== Early life and college ==
Clemente J. Gordon was born on August 14, 1967. He played college football for the Grambling State Tigers of Grambling State University from 1986 to 1989. He was inducted into the Grambling Legends Sports Hall of Fame in 2022.

== Professional career ==
Gordon was selected by the Cleveland Browns in the 11th round, with the 296th overall pick, of the 1990 NFL draft. He was also selected by the Chicago White Sox in the 51st round of the 1990 Major League Baseball draft. He signed with the Browns in 1990 but was waived later that year on August 23, 1990.

Gordon was signed to the practice squad of the Dallas Cowboys on October 1, 1990. He spent the rest of the year on the practice squad and became a free agent after the season.

On April 23, 1991, Gordon was selected by the Orlando Thunder of the World League of American Football (WLAF) in a special midseason WLAF quarterback draft. The draft was convened to give WLAF teams a third-string practice quarterback after the San Antonio Riders lost two quarterbacks due to injuries.

Gordon played in eight games for the Cincinnati Rockers of the Arena Football League (AFL) in 1992 as the backup to Art Schlichter, completing seven of 16 passes (43.8%) for 50 yards and one touchdown. He also posted two solo tackles and two assisted tackles.

He was a member of the Coventry Jaguars of the BAFA National Leagues in England in 1993.

Gordon appeared in eight games for the Miami Hooters of the AFL in 1993, throwing a five-yard completion and posting two solo tackles. He played in nine games for the Hooters during the 1994 season, totaling 29 completions on 67 passing attempts (43.3%) for 319 yards, five touchdowns, and one interception, five rushing attempts for ten yards, and two catches for 34 yards.

Gordon played in 11 games for the AFL's Connecticut Coyotes during the 1995 season, completing 107 of 215 passes (49.8%) for 1,223 yards, 17 touchdowns, and eight touchdowns while also rushing eight times for 73 yards and two touchdowns. He posted four solo tackles, one forced fumble, and one fumble recovery as well. The Coyotes finished the season with a 1–11 record.

Gordon appeared in three games for the Charlotte Rage of the AFL in 1996, recording one of one passing attempts for six yards.

He played in ten games for the AFL's Florida Bobcats in 1997, rushing 13 times for 19 yards and three touchdowns and making one solo tackle. He appeared in ten games for the Bobcats in 1998, completing 33 of 56 passes (58.9%) for 401 yards, nine touchdowns, and one interception. Gordon played in ten games for the third straight season in 2000, recording 31 completions on 79 passing attempts (39.2%) for 325 yards, five touchdowns, and two interceptions.
