= Copenhagen Towers =

Danish American football team

- Founded: August 20th, 1990
- League: National Ligaen
- Based in: Gentofte, Denmark
- Stadium: Gentofte Stadium
- Colors: Purple and white
- President: Jacob Amholt
- Head coach: Simon Rasmussen
- Championships: 12 (1992, 1993, 1994, 1995, 2013, 2014, 2017, 2018, 2021, 2022, 2023, 2024)
- Website: copenhagen-towers.dk

The Copenhagen Towers are an American football team from Gentofte, Denmark. The club was founded in 1990, and have since competed in the National Ligaen, the highest division of American football in Denmark. The Copenhagen Towers are members of the Danish American Football Federation (DAFF), and have won the Danish Championship game (known as the Mermaid Bowl) a record twelve times. In 2017 the Towers won the Northern European Football League.

After a winless season in 1997, the Towers were relegated to Division 1 but were promoted again the following year. The Towers were again relegated in 2005 and spent the next season in Division 1. Since 2007, the Towers have been a regular feature in the National Ligaen, where they have won the Mermaid Bowl 8 times since returning.

In 2012, the Towers went undefeated (10–0) in regular season. In 2013, the Towers returned to the Mermaid Bowl, which they won 28–21 against the Triangle Razorbacks. In 2025 the Towers took part in the Swedish league Superserien.

== Recent seasons ==
Recent seasons of the club:

Year	Division	Finish	Games	W	D	L	Pct.	PF	PA	Postseason
2008	National Ligaen	2nd	10	8	0	2	0.800	265	117	SF: Lost: Søllerød Gold Diggers (0–13)
2009	National Ligaen	3rd	8	4	0	6	0.40	141	212	
2010	National Ligaen	2nd	10	7	0	3	0.70	232	238	SF: Lost: Triangle Razorbacks (7–42)
2011	National Ligaen	2nd	10	7	0	3	0.70	412	168	SF: Lost: Triangle Razorbacks (13–23)
2012	National Ligaen	1st	10	10	0	0	1.00	412	108	SF: Lost: Søllerød Gold Diggers (35–41 in OT)
2013	National Ligaen	1st	10	10	0	0	1.00	465	83	MB: Won: Triangle Razorbacks (28–21)
2014	National Ligaen	1st	10	9	0	1	0.900	403	54	MB: Won: Aarhus Tigers (26–3)
2015	National Ligaen	3rd	10	6	0	4	0.600	296	117	SF: Lost: Søllerød Gold Diggers (0–3)
2016	National Ligaen	1st	10	9	0	1	0.900	363	119	SF: Won: Amager Demons (49–14) MB: Lost: Triangle Razorbacks (18–22)
2017	National Ligaen	1st	10	9	0	1	0.900	399	100	SF: Won: Aarhus Tigers (61–12) MB: Won: Søllerød Gold Diggers (20–7)
2018	National Ligaen	1st	10	10	0	0	1.000	0	0	SF: Won: AAB 89ers (49–18) MB: Won: Triangle Razorbacks (23-22)
2019	National Ligaen	1st	10	10	0	0	1.000	0	0	SF: Won: AAB 89ers (60–20) MB: Lost: Triangle Razorbacks (16-20)
2020	National Ligaen	1st	3	3	0	0	1.000	0	0	COVID: SEASON CANCELED
2021	National Ligaen	2nd	6	4	0	2	0.667	234	121	SF: Won: AAB 89ers (45–29) MB: Won: Søllerød Gold Diggers (24-7)

- SF = National Ligaen semifinals
- MB = Mermaid Bowl (national final)

== Youth teams ==
The Copenhagen Towers have youth teams for four age groups, Junior (Under-19), Development (Under-16), Kadet (Under-14), and Mini (Under-12).

== Famous players ==
- (United States) Dustin Tervelt (2009)
- (United States) J.R. Artozqui (2010-2014)
- (Denmark) Magnus Alexander Bitsch (2011-)
