= New Zealand American Football Federation =

Sports governing body in New Zealand

New Zealand American football Federation, abbreviated NZAFF, is the recognised national body for American football in New Zealand.

== Member leagues ==
Currently, there are three leagues in New Zealand. Each is affiliated to the governing body.

- American football Auckland
- American football Wellington
- American football Canterbury

== National team ==
The New Zealand Steelblacks are the national team of New Zealand, formerly known as the New Zealand Ironblacks.

List of various New Zealand representative teams (NZ team names will vary depending on governing body.)

- 1983 NZ All-Stars vs US Armed Forces All-Stars
- 1984 Air NZ All-Stars vs LAPD Centurions
- 1985 NZGFA team was selected for an LAPD Centurions return game in NZ which did not eventuate.
- 1986 NZ Warriors vs William Jewel College, Missouri.
- 1986 NZ vs USA Eagles. NCAA Division 3 Selection
- 1987 NZ vs Pacific Lutheran Selection, Washington
- 1987 NZ Warriors vs Queensland Taipans, game 1
- 1987 NZ Warriors vs Queensland Taipans, game 2.
- 1988 NZ vs Augsburg College, Minnesota
- 1991 NZ Warriors vs Queensland Taipans
- 1991 South Auckland Raiders vs. Gridiron Victoria
- 1992 NZ Warriors vs Gustavus Adolphus College
- 1992 Wellington Capitals vs Doane College, Nebraska
- 1992 Wellington Giants vs Doane College, Nebraska
- 1993 NZ Gladiators vs Queensland Taipans
- 1996 Wellington Hurricanes vs Doane College, Nebraska
- 1997 Wellington Storm vs Doane College, Nebraska
- 1997 NZ Haka vs Australian Allies
- 1997 NZ Haka vs Australian Bushrangers (ANZAC Bowl)
- 1997 NZ All-Stars vs Dixie State University, Utah
- 1997 NZ All-Stars vs Snow College, Utah
- 1997 NZ All-Stars vs Ricks College, Idaho
- 1998 NZ Haka vs Australian Allies
- 1999 NZ Haka (Down Under Bowl)
- 2001 NZ Haka vs Queensland (Australia)
- 2001 NZ Haka vs Arizona All-Stars
- 2001 NZ Haka Colts vs Kentucky All-Stars
- 2001 NZ Haka vs NW USA All-Stars
- 2003 NZ Haka vs Victoria (Australia)
- 2003 NZ Haka Colts vs Victoria (Australia)
- 2003 NZ Haka Colts vs. Kentucky All-Stars
- 2003 NZ Haka Colts vs Tennessee All-Stars
- 2003 NZ Haka Colts vs Australia (Oceana Bowl)
- 2003 NZ/AUS (TDU/Arena) vs Quad City Steamwheelers
- 2003 Auckland Vulcans vs Dioane College, Nebraska
- 2003 NZ Iron Blacks vs. Australia
- 2003 NZ Iron Blacks Colts vs Australia
- 2005 NZ Iron Blacks vs Australian Outback
- 2009 NZ Iron Black Colts vs Australia (JWC Qualifier).
- 2009 NZ Iron Black Colts vs Canada (JWC, Canton, Ohio).
- 2009 NZ Iron Black Colts vs Germany (JWC, Canton, Ohio).
- 2009 NZ Iron Black Colts vs France (JWC, Canton, Ohio).
- 2015 NZ Steel Blacks Colts vs Australia (JWC Qualifier).
- 2016 NZ Steel Blacks vs. American Samoa
- 2016 NZ Steel Blacks Colts vs Australia

== History ==
American football has been played in New Zealand in an organised form since 1982. Early scrimmages reportedly taking place as far back as 1971 at Kelston Boys High school and run by "The Godfather" of NZ football, George O'Scanlon. The first reported game was in 1975 between a team in Auckland known as the ADC (Auckland Distribution Centre) Cowboys who travelled to Hamilton for a one-off game against the CCNZOB's (Church College NZ Old Boys).

As is tradition in American football USA, a cheer squad also traveled with the ADC Cowboys to support the team. This was the start of a long affiliation of cheer squads formed by teams to support the game of American football in NZ.

The scrimmages in Auckland continued and would go on to see the formation of the Metro Lions and Henderson Rangers clubs. There were 4 original clubs formed in 1982, based in Auckland; South Auckland Saints, Metro Lions, Henderson Rangers and North Shore. 2 of those clubs remain today, the Saints as South Auckland Raiders and the Mountain Lions as Metro Lions. Much later competition was started in Wellington and other clubs were formed in places like Whangarei, Tauranga, Hamilton, Wanganui, Palmerston North and Levin.

The game today sees the continued growth of the game in Canterbury, Hawkes Bay and Nelson.

1940's exhibition football was played in wartime New Zealand, with games put on by US serviceman during WW2. Reported games were played in both Auckland and Wellington between rival US warships.

1949 sees the first reported NZ football player to make a US college team. Joe Hapi from the Hawkes Bay area appears on the BYU Cougars football team as an offensive lineman.

1964 saw exhibition football played in Gisborne as elders of The Church of Jesus Christ of Latter-Day Saints put on a game complete with full equipment for the locals. Kaiti Trojans played the Te Hapara Packers.

Once again in the late '70s, elders of The Church of Jesus Christ of Latter-Day Saints introduced football to the Polynesian communities in Auckland and Hamilton, which would lead to the early scrimmages and the competition in Auckland as we know it today.

1983 saw the San Francisco 49ers draft high-profile USC linebacker Riki Ellison. Riki's presence in the NFL would help promote the game to NZers and prove that Kiwis could make it in professional American football.

During the late 80's NZ Football received unprecedented media coverage when TV3 began to broadcast NFL highlights packages and Sky Sports would televise the Super Bowl live. The then NZGFA sports information director Ed Mason's work, especially in the newspaper print media was essential to spreading the word that American football had now well and truly arrived in NZ. Ed Mason went on to become a founding member of NZ Baseball and was inducted into the NZ Baseball Hall Of Fame. Ed Mason is also a Life Member of the Metro Lions American football Club.

The sport has had a succession of governing bodies, with the current NZAFF recognized by the NZ Government and with membership from all regions playing football: Auckland, Hamilton, Wellington and Christchurch. Twice in its history, there have been organisational splits with competing leagues being formed. In the late 1980s, the NZ Gridiron Football Association and the NZ American Football League emerged; in the late 1990s and early 2000s, Gridiron New Zealand and the NZ American Football Association. On both occasions, the leagues rejoined and overcame their differences.

1989 saw former NZAFL founder George O'Scanlon establish the ISSI for athletes in Australia, which would go on to introduce the Down Under Bowl concept in the Southern Hemisphere. A tournament NZ would eventually send teams to Australia to compete in. Down Under Bowl directors George O'Scanlon and former Utah State University head coach and BYU special teams coach Chris Pella were instrumental in bringing numerous football programs to NZ in the 1980s and creating countless pathways for NZ football players who wanted pursue the game further in the US.

Gridiron NZ saw the introduction and much-needed promotion of age grades to American football in NZ, a component essential to its continued growth over the years.

The Canadian Football League has also seen a number of athletes with NZ roots make an appearance on rosters over the years. Luc Mullinder, Will Hinchcliff and Johan Asiata.

Likewise, there has also been a number of athletes appearing on NFL rosters in last few years with NZ roots including Stephen Paea (Bears, Redskins, Browns), Tevita Finau (Jets, Texans), Kona Schwenke (Seahawks), Rhett Ellison (Vikings) BYU rugby convert Paul Lasike (Cardinals, Bears). Others to try out for NFL spots over the years include Will Hinchcliff (Redskins), Nic Purcell (Eagles), Joe Tuineau (Jets), Johan Asiata (Bears) and Abe Markowitz (Seahawks), Andrew Motu'apuaka (Jacksonville Jaguars)

American football Auckland Club Profiles There have been a number of clubs in New Zealand since the game's inception, only 2 original clubs remain but some of the others have been:

Metro Lions: Originally known as the Mountain Lions. A foundation club that ran out of Potters Park in Mount Eden. Founding and life members included Pose Tafa, Willie-John Stowers and the late Peter Tua'i. To their credit they continue to this day and are one of the most successful clubs in the country. They are the Metro Lions and were one of the first club to supply players to US College football and the NFL. Most notable was Mark Nua who received a full football scholarship to play at the University of Hawaii. Mark Nua was drafted in the NFL by the Detroit Lions before eventually landing on the San Diego Chargers roster. Mark also played in the World League of American Football for the Sacramento Surge. Also attending the University of Hawaii was sprinter and part-time actor John Freeman. Another of the pioneer Metro Lions to attend college was Toa Sagapolu who played for the University of California Berkeley, playing in the famous Citrus Bowl in 1992 in Orlando. Former Toa Samoa and NZ Warriors rugby league player Shannon Stowers also attended Utah State University. More recently William Hodgman attended Arizona Western College. The club today is based out of Grey Lynn Park. Colours: Black jerseys and silver pants.

South Auckland Raiders: A founding club who were originally named the South Auckland Saints. Foundation members included Lawrence Tafa, Arthur Beazley, and Colin Tavui. When the Auckland league first split into two in the early 1980s, they changed their name to the Xerox Raiders and changed their colours to purple and silver. Initially heavily influenced by members of the Church of Jesus Christ of Latter-day Saints who supplied coaching and local players. Former Tongan RWC player Joe Tuineau who attended SE Missouri University spent time on the NY Jets roster. Colours: Red with white numbers and black pants, later white jerseys with orange numbers and pants.

Henderson Rangers: A founding club and under the direction of NZ gridiron pioneer, the late George O’Scanlan. George O'Scanlon reportedly ran a football team at Kelston Boys High School back in the 1970s but failed to find any opposition. O'Scanlon continued to organize games and scrimmages through the late '70s that lead to the formation of both the Henderson Rangers and Metro Lions clubs. They also provided players to the US College system. Former Manu Samoa and Auckland rugby star Timo Tagaloa was the first NZ athlete to receive a full football scholarship to Utah State University. Also JC college and rugby league player Robert Marsom who spent time at Eastern Utah and El Camino colleges. Henderson Rangers continued as a successful club for many years before folding in the early 2000s. Colours: Dark Green with white numbers, gold pants and helmets, later royal blue jerseys with white numbers and red trim, blue pants with red and white stripes, red helmets.

North Shore: North Shore was one of the 4 founding clubs in NZ football. Essentially it was based out of Long Bay College where an American teacher Wes Edwards put together a very good team. Star players included Joe Fepuleai, David Woods and Nick Leger, both of whom would go on to play for the Roskill Rams and Mt Albert Mustangs. While lacking in size, they did the basics well, especially the sweep with their quick backs. The club lasted for only a few years before folding and several players joining other established teams. Colours: Red with yellow numbers and white pants.

Roskill Rams: The first of the expansion clubs founded by Tony Andrews with the assistance of Mark Nua and Wayne Wright and was made up mainly of former Metro Lions players. Was very successful in their first season taking out the league championship, continued as a strong club until the late 1980s when players left en-masse to form the Mount Albert Mustangs. Notable player included another former Manu Samoa rugby star Sam Kaleta who reportedly went to University of Arizona before returning to rugby. Also former NZ Maori All Black Paul Tuoro. Former team kicker Michael Chalberg would be the rare recipient of a full football scholarship to the University of Minnesota. Struggled for many years after that before folding in the early 90s. Brothers Ritch and Chris Tia attended Snow College in Utah, before returning to play for the Metro Lions after the Rams folded. Colours: Forest Green jerseys with white numbers, pants and helmets, later, red jerseys with white numbers, pants and helmets, later, royal jerseys with white numbers and pants.

After returning from the United States, former college linebacker Eddie Tavae established the Manurewa Miners Rugby League Club in South Auckland with support from his family. The Manurewa squad quickly attracted attention in the local sporting community, drawing players from both rugby league and rugby union. Early members included Kiwi and Auckland league player Francis Leota; Fox Memorial competition players Peter and John Fue; rugby international Paul Tuoro; local rugby figure Kere Maihi; and former U.S. college player Rob Billington.

Dave Dixon, the Pukekohe born played for the Miners...moved to the US on a scholarship...drafted by the National Football League New England Patriots. On the winning Super Bowl roster for the Dallas Cowboys and then played for the Minnesota Vikings where he retired after an 11 year career.

Assisting Coach Tavae were two former Metro Lions players Ray Coulson and Ray Hinkes...the key to why the team was established was to create a club to bring the talents known in the south an opportunity to be seem...the club worked on sponsorships and fundraisers to alleviate the stresses on players for fees and acquired equipment from colleges in the states who donated and sent it to the NZ based club...Miners Football team played on for five seasons

Team colours were Bottle Green Jerseys with gold numbers and Gold pants with green white green stripes.

Manukau City Stallions: Founded by former Metro Lions and South Auckland Saints player Don Macleod and fellow Saints player Tony Fuimaono. At the time of formation they were the southernmost club in the country, despite only being situated 30 minutes south of the harbour bridge. They were based in Manukau City and attracted a good player base and following from that area. Benefitted from the fact that the founder was the official Rawlings representative in NZ. Former player Parrish Macleod played football at Orange Coast College before transferring to University of the Pacific. Colours: Sky blue jerseys and pants, white numbers and helmets.

Tip Tip Bulldogs:A team from South Auckland. Founding members include John Tavae, Tom and Roy Bourke, John Rima, Moe Faaofo and Mose Petaia. Bulldogs were also managed by Rona and Lafuga Lokeni.

Papatoetoe Wildcats: Originally formed as part of the NZAFL expansion by Pose Tafa and known then as the Central Pirates.The initial squad was a mixture of Roskill Rams and Metro Lions players who went back to their old clubs when the NZGFA competition restarted. Based out of Penrose High School. Eventually they changed their name to the East Auckland Wildcats when the 2 leagues merged and are now better known as the Papatoetoe Wildcats. Winning the Auckland competition in the 2016 and 2017 season they are on the way to being one of the most successful clubs in New Zealand. Their first US college player was Houdini Nua who attended University of Utah. Colours: Red jerseys, black pants and black helmets.

Waitemata Rebels: Another of the inaugural NZAFL expansion teams, which was essentially the Henderson Rangers team represented in a different competition. Colours: All white strip.

North Shore Guardians: NZAFL expansion North Shore team. Coached by Dixon Lupo. Colours: Dark blue jerseys and white pants.

Northland Nuggets: A Whangarei-based team founded by Northland Rugby legends the Going family. Team was set up with the assistance of the South Auckland Saints but only lasted a short time before folding.

Hamilton Hawks: Founded and originally coached by Canadian Ralph Lovell and carried on by the Williams family. Another successful expansion club from the mid-'80s which remains the power base of football in the Waikato region. Consistently competitive club through the decades at all age group levels.

Mount Albert Mustangs: Formed in the late 1980s with a large number of members from the Roskill Rams and immediately started a 7-year dynasty where they reigned as champions. A strong family emphasis was the key to the club's success with a great line up of athletes including the Fepuleai's, Rawhiti's, Opetaia's, Legers, Seumanu's, Amiatu's amongst many others. Colours: Maroon jerseys with gold numbers, pants and helmets.

North Shore Knights A North Shore club founded by former South Auckland Raiders pioneer Colin Tavui. Another spin-off from the NZAFL.

Waikato Spears: A club formed with a combination of Hamilton Hawks and Mustangs players. Another overnight powerhouse who dominated the league for a few years before folding. The club re-emerged again in the Australian Capital Territories competition as the Central Spears.

Wolverines: A South Auckland team that was started by Eddie and John Tavae. Played in a black with yellow trim, with a ripping claw decal on their black helmets.

Central Cougars Based out of Mt Roskill. Also formerly known as the Central Jaguars. An amalgamation of players from the Roskill Rams and Wolverines when both clubs folded in the late 90s. Played in Pittsburgh Steelers colors of black, white and yellow.

North Shore Bears: One of a procession of teams that formed and folded in short order on Auckland's North Shore. Based by the harbour bridge at Stafford Park and played in a replica of the Cleveland Browns distinctive uniform.

Waipuna Sharks: The Waipuna Sharks were based in the Glen Innes, Mount Wellington area. Their formation, playing and coaching success was based around Wayne Boyd who was an early star running back playing for Henderson Rangers. Played in navy blue with silver pants.

Manukau City Islanders: Populated in the main (as the name suggests) by Pacific Islanders, they were a powerhouse for a number of years but tended to lack discipline on the field and that resulted in their demise. Despite trying to get back up and running a few times, they failed to do so. Navy blue jerseys and pants with gold numbers, navy helmets with a big gold roman letter I on the side.

Hamilton Bulls: A late 90s expansion team in the Hamilton area. Lasted a few years before folding.

Tamaki Lightning: The Tamaki Lightning was started in 1999 as one of the founding clubs of the Gridiron New Zealand (GNZ) organisation. First coached by Adam Campbell. Frustrated at how the sport of American football was being run, this new league focused on promoting juniors football along with improving the fundamental football skills and overall general level of play. As a result, the early years of the Tamaki Lightning were highlighted by the number of teams available to the community. Not only did they have the Premier (seniors) Team that still plays today, there was also U13, U15, U17, U19, 8-a-side, and Women's teams playing in competitions. To provide a top level of coaching to all of these teams, the first 10 years of the Lightning also featured a number of international imports from around the world – The United States, Canada, Italy, Switzerland and Austria to name a few. Andy Nordine who toured NZ with the visiting Doane College Tigers amongst others.

North Harbour Pride: The North Harbour Pride was formed in 1999 as an originating club within the Gridiron New Zealand organisation. The club began with the development of a senior team and 2 under 14 teams. For the first year and most of the second season, the head coach was ex NFL player, Mark Nua. 2001 saw North Harbour Pride importing American player / Head Coach Joe Ashfield and receiver Matt Wegge, both from Minneapolis. Founded by GNZ pioneer Wayne Wright. Former coach Joe Ashfield is currently an assistant coach with Stanford University. Since the merger of the 2 leagues, the club remains without a Seniors team, but its Juniors team remains very competitive. The club continues with the promise of senior teams to expand into the future.

North Peninsula Panthers: West Auckland club from the 2000s

Waitakere Typhoon: Another West Auckland club concentrating on juniors grade.

Western Wolves: Another recent expansion team of the NZAFF era that has evolved in the new AFA competition.

JC Spartans: Founded on the idea of Bart Tamehana-King, a senior student at James Cook High. He suggested getting an American football team together to help keep students on the straight and narrow. Originally coached by Alex Cunnard. Based in South Auckland at Montfort Park, Manurewa. Green and white jerseys.

Papakura Kings: Another new club founded in 2016 by Gaileen Thew. Foundation treasurer Daniel Newman secured funding from the Whanau O Tumanako Charitable Trust to get the club started. Based in Papakura. Like most new clubs, emphasis is on youth football with Juniors and Colts teams.

Otara Scorpions: Another new club in the Juniors competition. Founded by Lani Ekepati.
