= Antonio Andrews =

American football player (born 1992)

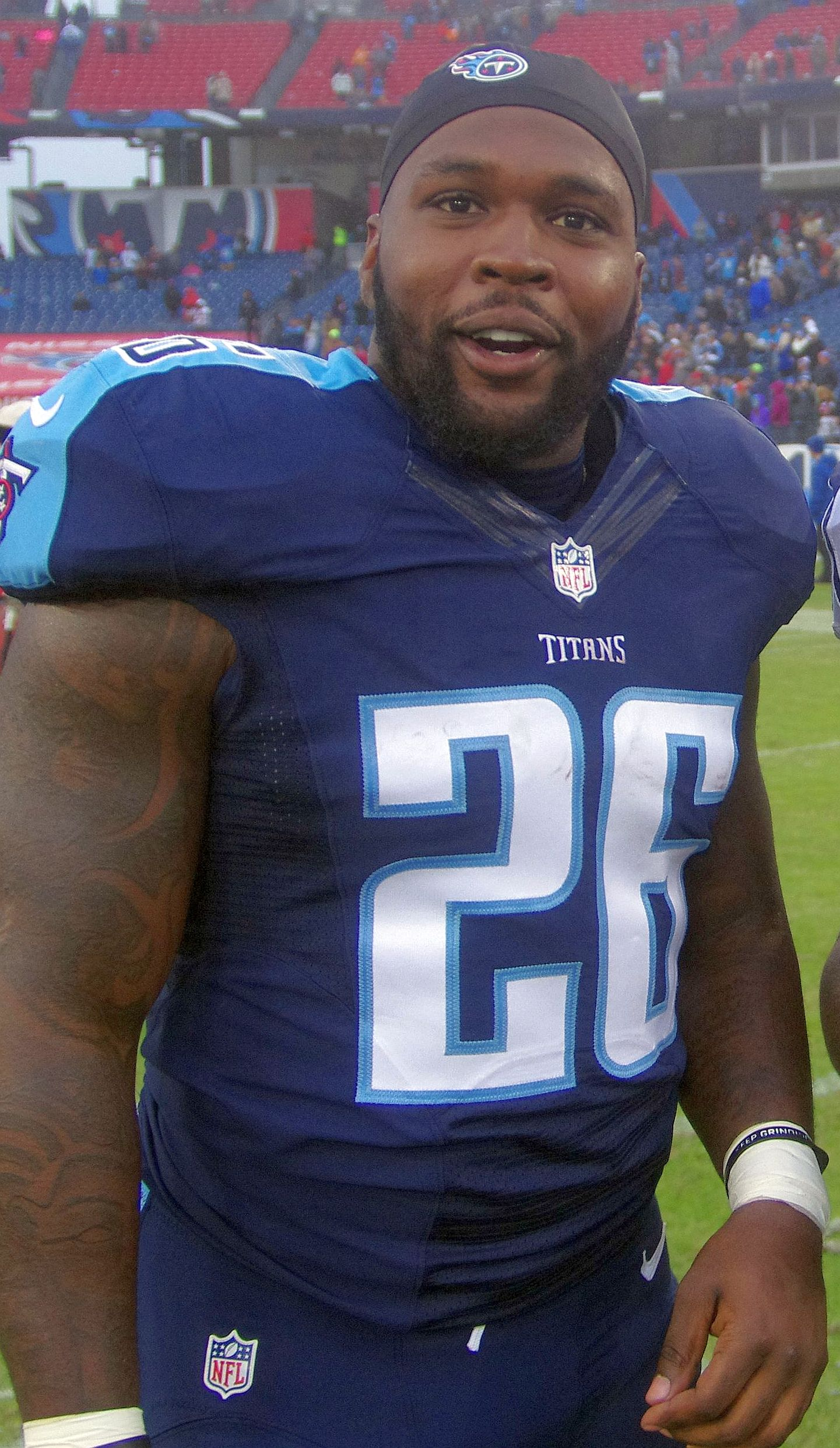
- Andrews with the Tennessee Titans in 2020

No. 26
- Position: Running back

Personal information
- Born: August 17, 1992 (age 34); Enterprise, Alabama, U.S.
- Listed height: 5 ft 10 in (1.78 m)
- Listed weight: 225 lb (102 kg)

Career information
- High school: Fort Campbell (Fort Campbell, Kentucky)
- College: Western Kentucky (2010–2013)
- NFL draft: 2014: undrafted

Career history
- Tennessee Titans (2014–2016); Memphis Express (2019)*
- * Offseason or practice squad member only

Awards and highlights
- Sun Belt Player of the Year (2013); Sun Belt Offensive Player of the Year (2013); 2× First-team All-Sun Belt (2012, 2013)

Career NFL statistics
- Rushing yards: 535
- Rushing average: 3.7
- Rushing touchdowns: 3
- Receptions: 23
- Receiving yards: 185
- Passing touchdowns: 1
- Stats at Pro Football Reference

Antonio Tramaine Andrews (born August 17, 1992) is an American former professional football player who was a running back for three seasons with the Tennessee Titans of the National Football League (NFL). He played college football for the Western Kentucky Hilltoppers and was signed as an undrafted free agent by the Titans in 2014. He was also a member of the Memphis Express of the Alliance of American Football (AAF), before their season began.

== Early life ==
Andrews played football for Fort Campbell High School. In his last two seasons, he went 29–0 as the starting quarterback and helped lead the team to two class 2A state championships. He was named Kentucky Mr. Football in 2009, his senior season. For his high school career, he threw for 3,365 yards and 50 touchdowns, and he rushed for 3,368 yards and 56 touchdowns.

== College career ==
Andrews joined the Western Kentucky Hilltoppers in 2010 and played in nine games. He had 174 rushing yards and 429 all-purpose yards. In 2011, Andrews played in eight games. He had 505 kick return yards and 590 all-purpose yards. He had a career-best 75-yard kick return against Navy.

As a junior in 2012, Andrews became WKU's starting running back. He led the Sun Belt Conference in rushing yards (1,728), punt return yards (234), and kickoff return yards (767). He scored 15 total touchdowns. Andrews also led the FBS in all-purpose yards per game, and his 3,161 all-purpose yards for the season was the second-highest total in FBS history, behind only Barry Sanders in 1988. Andrews had over 300 all-purpose yards in the last four games of the regular season.

Andrews made the 2012 All-Sun Belt Conference Offense First-team, and he had been named the Sun Belt Conference Offensive Player of the Week three times that season. He was also a finalist for the Paul Hornung Award.

For his senior season, Andrews was named to the 2013 CFPA Running Back Trophy Watch List as one of the nation's top 36 running backs. He finished the season with 1,730 rushing yards on 267 carries. For his career, he had 3,674 rushing yards.

== Professional career ==
Pre-draft measurables
Height	Weight	Arm length	Hand span	40-yard dash	20-yard shuttle	Three-cone drill	Vertical jump	Broad jump	Bench press
5 ft 10 1/8 in (1.78 m)	225 lb (102 kg)	31 1/4 in (0.79 m)	9 1/2 in (0.24 m)	4.82 s	4.49 s	7.24 s	29.5 in (0.75 m)	8 ft 10 in (2.69 m)	20 reps
All values from NFL Combine

=== Tennessee Titans ===
After going undrafted in the 2014 NFL draft, the Tennessee Titans agreed to a contract with Andrews. On August 29, 2014, he was released by the Titans. However, he was re-signed to the Titans' 10-man practice squad just two days later. He was activated on October 21, 2014.

Andrews made his NFL debut on November 23, 2014, against the Philadelphia Eagles. On September 27, 2015, Andrews scored his first career touchdown following a 12 carry, 149 yard performance against the Colts. On November 4, 2015, the Tennessee Titans fired head coach Ken Whisenhunt and named tight end coach Mike Mularkey the interim head coach. The following day, Mularkey named Andrews the starting running back. On December 13, 2015, Andrews threw his first career passing touchdown to Marcus Mariota for 41 yards. Andrews finished the 2015 season with 1250 rushing yards on 187 attempts and 14 touchdowns.

Andrews began the 2016 season as the third running back on the Titans' depth chart after they acquired DeMarco Murray and drafted Derrick Henry. In the 2016 season, he appeared in all 16 games in mainly a special teams role.

On March 7, 2017, it was reported that Andrews would remain an unrestricted free agent after the Tennessee Titans opted to not apply a restricted free agent tender on him.

=== Memphis Express ===
In 2018, Andrews signed with the Memphis Express of the Alliance of American Football (AAF) for the 2019 season. He was released before the season began.

=== Cabo Marlins ===
In November 2021, Andrews signed with Mexican team Cabo Marlins ahead of the 2022 Fútbol Americano de México season. However, he did not end up playing with the team.
