= Papatoetoe Wildcats =

Papatoetoe Wildcats is an American football club established in 1986 in South Auckland, New Zealand. The club was founded as the Central Pirates by Pose Tafa, then the East Auckland Wildcats, but moved to South Auckland renaming them as the Papatoetoe Wildcats.

The club has produced some elite New Zealand based players who have since travelled abroad.

The Wildcats have a direct membership of approximately 40 Premier Men playing in the American Football Auckland competition under the auspices of the New Zealand American Football Association or the NZAFA, its national body. The Wildcats also have an Under 19s (Colts) team and an Under 16s (Junior) team. Most of the players come from various sporting codes, mainly from Rugby Union and Rugby League.

The Wildcats currently practice at the Manukau Sportsbowl and previous practice at Papatoetoe Intermediate and the Papatoetoe Panthers Rugby League club grounds.

The Wildcats have had a number of players play nationally and overseas:

Tyer Matia who played for the Coventry Jets in 2007 and in 2009 played Arena Football in the AF2 league for the Rio Grande Dorados in Texas USA. Tyler is assigned to play for the Dorados again in 2009. Tyler was also a part of the New Zealand under 21 Colts national team that beat Australia on home soil in 2003.

Joseph Taula is also playing a season in the US for the Arena Football AF2 team the Tri Cities Fever in Washington and was then traded to the Stockton Lightning. He will be playing for the lightning again in 2009.. Joseph has played at all level s in New Zealand and represented New Zealand at the Colts and Senior Men's Ironblacks 2001 and 2003.

Albert Bernard has been assigned by AF@ Agent Jason Vaka to the Iowa BArnstormers for 2009. Albert represented New Zealand as an Ironblack in 2001 and 2003.

Thomas Wynne who played in a preseason game with the Coventry Jets in 2007 also joined the Coventry Jets with Tyler Matia for Britbowl XXII winning 33 to 32 against rivals the London Blitz. Thomas represented New Zealand as an Ironblack in 2001 and then in 2005.

The club has established an ongoing relationship with British American football club the Coventry Jets

== Achievements ==
- 2002 Snr Kiwi Bowl XX Winners
- 2002 National Club III Winners
- 2002 U18 Kiwi Bowl IV Winners
- 2004 U18 Kiwi Bowl VI Winners
- 2008 Unified Kiwibowl XXVII Winners
- 2010 Unified Kiwibowl XXIX Winners
- 2011 Colts Unity Bowl Winners
- 2011 Unified Kiwibowl XXX Winners
- 2012 Colts Unity Bowl Winners
- 2014 Unified Kiwibowl XXXII Winners
- 2016 Unified Kiwibowl XXXIV Winners
- 2017 Unified Kiwibowl XXXV Winners

== See also ==
- New Zealand American Football Federation
