= New Zealand national American football team =

New Zealand
- Name: New Zealand

First international

Biggest win
- 17-0 v Australia 1997

Biggest defeat
- 10-30 v American Samoa 2016

The New Zealand national American Football team, nicknamed the Iron Blacks, represent New Zealand in international American football (gridiron) competitions.

The Ironblacks were formerly known as the Haka, until 2003 when the branding changed to the present Ironblacks image in preparation for Oceania Bowl II against the Australian Outbacks. Team was formally known as the Steelblacks from 2016 to 2025 for the team following the transition of governance of the sport to New Zealand American Football Federation.

The Ironblacks nickname is one of many national team nicknames related to the All Blacks.

== See also ==
- New Zealand American Football Federation
- American football
