= Danish American Football Federation =

Sports governing body

The Danish American Football Federation (DAFF; Danish: Dansk Amerikansk Fodbold Forbund) is an American football organization in Denmark founded in 1988. Its headquarters are located in Brøndby. DAFF organizes Denmark's national American football team, which competes in the International Federation of American Football. They also govern flag football and cheerleading.

Since 2000, DAFF has seen a huge increase in membership, influenced by Danish television station TV2 Zulu broadcasts of National Football League (NFL) games on Sunday evenings. The sudden popularity of the sport in Denmark has been dubbed "the Zulu effect" after the name of the TV station. As of the 2007 season, Viasat obtained the rights to broadcast the NFL in Denmark on both 3+ and TV 2 Sport (Viasat owns 49 percent of TV 2 Sport).

The popularity of American football in Denmark can also be attributed to the nation's interest in the long career of Danish placekicker Morten Andersen, the NFL's all-time leader in points.

== National League teams ==
Team	City	Stadium	Coordinates	Founded (Lineage)	Head coach	Top Executive	Owner
AaB 89ers	Aalborg, North Denmark Region	89ers Field	57°02′36″N 10°01′10″E	March 1989	Jacob Zinck Thellufsen	Simon B. Nielsen	
Triangle Razorbacks	Vejle, Region of Southern Denmark	Vejle Athletic Stadium	55°42′50″N 9°33′33″E	2000			
Aarhus Tigers	Aarhus, Central Denmark Region	Bøgeskov Sports	56°07′09″N 10°07′38″E	2012	Thomas Pedersen	Jesper Christensen	
Søllerød Gold Diggers	Nærum, Rudersdal Municipality	Rundforbi Stadion	55°49′33″N 12°32′26″E	2003	Troels Vestergaard	Casper Reinhardt	
Copenhagen Towers	Gentofte, Capital Region of Denmark	Gentofte Sportspark	55°45′26″N 12°31′38″E	1990	Peter Herbild	Jakob Munksgaard	
Odense Badgers	Odense, Region of Southern Denmark						

== Danish American Football Federation Hall of Fame ==
DAFF opened the Danish American Football Federation Hall of Fame on February 5, 2006, the day of Super Bowl XL.

Players

- Morten Andersen (Inducted 2006) - First Dane in NFL. Former kicker for New Orleans Saints, Atlanta Falcons, New York Giants, Kansas City Chiefs and Minnesota Vikings.
- Michael Boed (2006) - Quarterback, Receiver, Kicker for Copenhagen Vikings and Copenhagen Towers
- Morten Hertz (2008) - Odense Swans, Aarhus Tigers, Copenhagen Towers and Kronborg Knights
- Robert Nederby (2006) - Receiver, Quarterback, Runningback, Linebacker, Cornerback for Herning Hawks, Aarhus Tigers
- Alexander Littau (2009) - Safety, Cornerback for Aarhus Tigers, Odense Swans
- Peter Overlade (2008)- Roskilde Kings
- Allan Pedersen (2006) - Lineman for Victoria Dolphins (Canada), Odense Swans, Kronborg Knights, Copenhagen Towers, Hvidovre Blackfoots
- Jens Bo Poulsen (2006) - Receiver, Runningback for Copenhagen Vikings, Copenhagen Towers
- Michael Weien (2007) - Linebacker/running back for Odense Swans, Aarhus Tigers, and Viby Troopers

Coaches

- Ron Da Costa (Inducted 2006) for Copenhagen Vikings, Roskilde Kings, Kronborg Knights, Herlev Rebels, Vestegnen Volunteers.
- John Lawson (2007) for Roskilde Kings, Aarhus Tigers, Herning Hawks. Appeared in five consecutive Mermaid Bowls with an overall 5-1 Mermaid Bowl record
- John Martinko (2006) for Copenhagen Towers.

Contributors

- Jimmy Bøjgaard (Inducted 2007) - play-by-play commentator with Claus Elming through 7 years on Zulu.
- Claus Elming (2006) - Color commentator for NFL on Denmark's TV2 Zulu. Also a coach for Avedøre Monarchs and Wide receiver for Herning Hawks and Aarhus Tigers also a founder of Aarhus Tigers.
- Torben Elming (2006) - Chairman of the Danish American Football Federation
- Menno Hilverdink (2006) - Started American Football in Denmark - Copenhagen Vikings
- Agnar Nielsen (2006) - Executive of Danish American Football Federation
- Tommy Terp (2006) - Executive of Esbjerg Hurricanes

== See also ==
- Denmark national American football team
- Denmark men's national flag football team
- Denmark women's national flag football team
