= Herlev Rebels =

Danish American football team

- Founded: 1990
- League: National Ligaen
- Based in: Herlev, Denmark
- Stadium: Hjortespring skole
- Colors: Mahogany and white
- President: Kim Larsen
- Head coach: Daniel Lassen
- Website: www.herlevrebels.dk

The Herlev Rebels is an American football team based in Herlev, Denmark. The club is a member of the Danish American Football Federation (DAFF). The club has teams playing in all tournaments offered by DAFF - Under 12, Under 14, Under 16, Under 19 and the club has teams on senior level, the Academy team and the National League. The club also offers flagfootball.

== History ==
Even if the National League team has never appeared in DAFF's championship game, Mermaid Bowl, the youth program has been successful over a number of years.

The Under 19 team has played the national championship game, Junior bowl 15 times and has won 12 times (1994, 1995, 1996, 1997, 2002, 2003, 2004, 2005, 2006, 2007, 2008, 2014). The Under 19 team is the most successful youth team in Denmark.

The club has existed since 1990.

== Famous players ==
- (United States) QB Mike Cook (2011), formerly with Harvard Crimson
- (United States) HB Robbie Millman (2012), formerly with WashU Bears
