= Mark A. Cohen =

American economist and professor

Mark Allan Cohen is an American professor at Vanderbilt University, who, since 2024, has served as Justin Potter Professor of American Competitive Enterprise, emeritus. (Note: His title has been emeritus since his retirement in 2024.) A researcher of economics and management, Cohen is a faculty member of both the Owen Graduate School of Management and the Vanderbilt University School of Law. His research focuses on law and economics, including corporate law, environmental regulation, and sustainability.

Cohen attended Georgetown University and received a Bachelor of Science in Foreign Service degree in international economics. He later attended Carnegie Mellon University, where he received Master of Arts and Doctor of Philosophy degrees in economics in 1985. He joined Vanderbilt as an assistant professor of management in 1986, was promoted to associate professor in 1991, and finally became a full professor in 2002. His endowed professorship was first established in 2003 in honor of Justin Potter. Cohen is also a university fellow at Resources for the Future.
