= Søllerød Gold Diggers =

- Founded: January 13th, 2003
- League: National Ligaen
- Based in: Rudersdal, Denmark
- Stadium: Rundforbi Stadion
- Colors: Black and gold
- President: Niels Neipper
- Head coach: Jens Ole Kaae
- Championships: 4 (2009, 2010, 2025, 2026)
- Mascot: Goldie
- Website: www.sgdfootball.com

The Søllerød Gold Diggers are an american football team from Rudersdal, Denmark. The club was founded in 2003.

Søllerød Gold Diggers are members of the Danish American Football Federation (DAFF) and compete in the National Ligaen, the highest division of American football in Denmark.

== National competition ==
The Gold Diggers have won the Danish championship, Mermaid Bowl, four times, in 2009, 2010, 2025 and 2026, first two times against Triangle Razorbacks from Vejle, in 2025 against Aalborg 89'ers and in 2026 against the Copenhagen Towers. Gold Diggers had their first Mermaid Bowl-experience in 2008 where they lost to The Razorbacks. Gold Diggers has been playing in National Ligaen since 2008.

== International competition ==
In 2009 Gold Diggers competede for the first time in EFAF Cup, where they meet and lost to Carlstad Crusaders from Sweden. They played again in 2011 where they defeated Les Cougars de Saint-Ouen L'Aumone (from the outskirts of Paris) and Coventry Jets before losing against later winners of the tournament London Blitz in the semifinals.

In 2012, the Gold Diggers won the EFAF Cup. During the tournament they played and defeated Wroclaw Giants (PL) and Prague Black Hawks (CZ) in the group stage, Amiens Spartiates (FR) in the semifinal and Triangle Razorbacks (DK) in the finale. The finale score being 31–21 and Danish QB Alexander Cimadon was named the games MVP.

== Honours ==
- Mermaid Bowl - Danish Champions
  - Winners : 2009, 2010, 2025, 2026
  - Runner-up : 2008, 2011, 2012, 2015, 2017, 2021, 2022
- EFAF Cup
  - Winners : 2012
- Junior Bowl - Danish U19 Champions
  - Winners : 2011, 2016, 2018, 2019
  - Runner-up : 2010

== Youth teams ==
Søllerød Gold Diggers has youth teams for five age groups, Under-19, Under-16, Under-14, Under-12 and Under-10.

== Famous players ==
- (United States) WR Desi Barbour (2008–2009), formerly with UC Davis
- (United States) OL Mike Moffitt (2008–2009), formerly with Arkansas Razorbacks, Prague Panthers
- (United States) DL Ryan Shotwell (2010), formerly with Cal Poly Mustangs
- (United States) DL Ryan Ploesser (2011), formerly with Truman State Bulldogs
- (United States) DL Robert Shapel (2012–2014), formerly with Missouri State Bears
- (United States) QB Zach Shaw (2013), formerly with Wisconsin Lutheran College
- (United States) DE Dylan Drake (2014), formerly with Yale Bulldogs
- (United States) RB Robert Burton III (2017), formerly with Northwest Missouri State University
- (United States) DB Desmond Cooper (2017 & 2019), formerly with Jacksonville Jaguars
- (United States) WR Anthony Dimarsico (2018), formerly with New York Jets
- (United States) WR Griffin Norberg (2019), formerly with Valparaiso University
- (United States) QB Nick Rooney (2019), formerly with Adams State University
- (Denmark) OL Hjalte Froholdt, formerly with Arkansas Razorbacks and New England Patriots, currently with Arizona Cardinals
