= Aarhus Tigers =

Danish American football club

- Founded: 1990
- League: Nationalligaen
- Based in: Aarhus
- Website: tigers.dk

The Aarhus Tigers are an American football club located in Aarhus, Denmark. The team was founded in 1990.

== History ==
The Tigers were founded in 1990 and played two practices games in that first year. In the following year they already competed in the top level league of Denmark losing the first game following by a streak of ten wins. The last game of that steak was the Mermaid Bowl were the young team won its first national championship in its first season. In 1992 the Tigers became the first Danish team to compete in the European Football League where they lost in the first round against the Aix-en-Provence Argonautes with 0–50. Also in the national championship the lost their first playoff game.
