= Eidsvoll 1814s =

American football team in Norway

- Founded: 1995
- League: Eliteserien
- Based in: Eidsvoll, Norway
- Stadium: Bøn stadion
- Colors: Red and Yellow
- Head coach: Jenny Widding
- Championships: Eliteserien: 2001, 2004, 2005, 2006, 2007, 2008, 2009, 2010, 2013, 2022, 2024

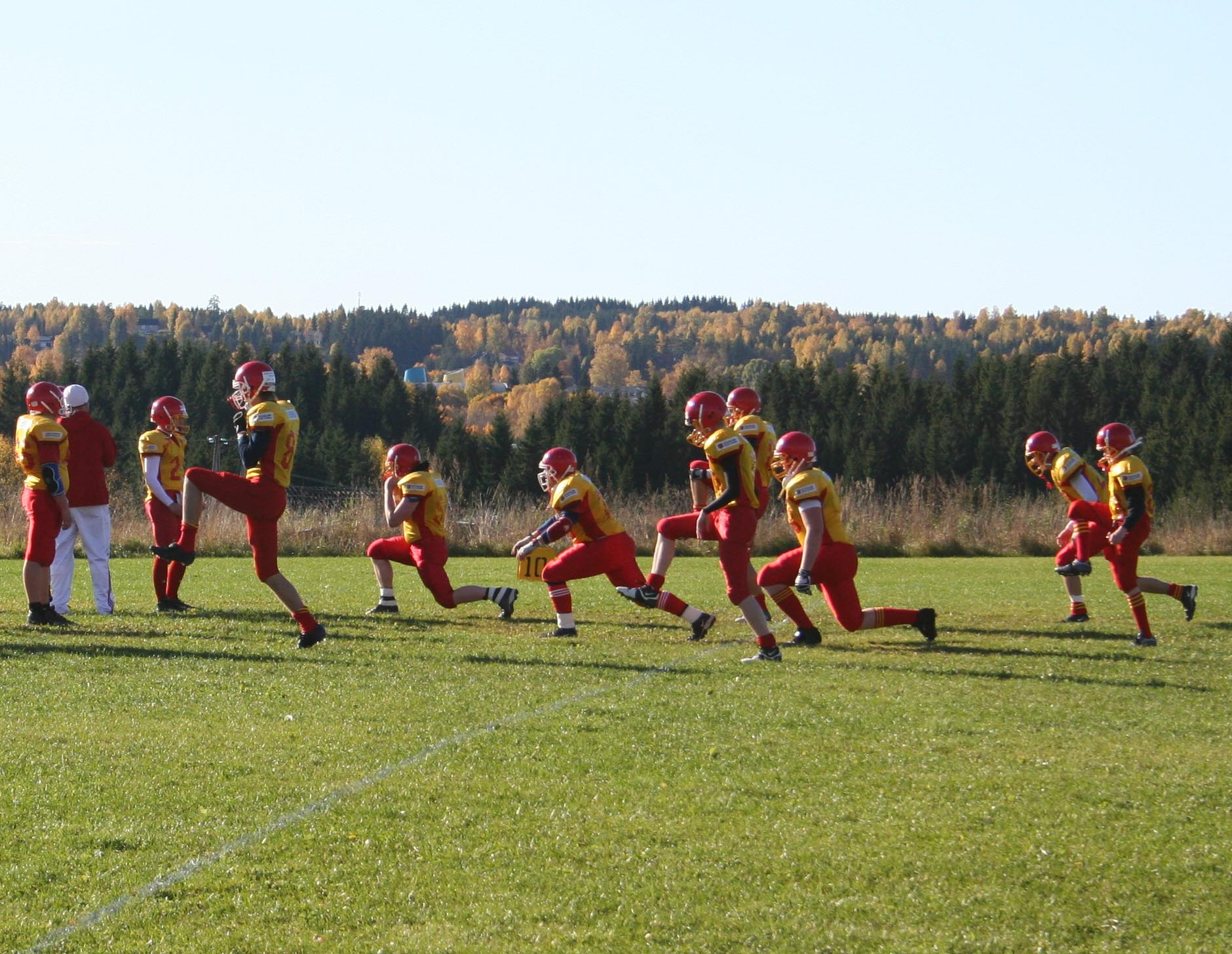
Eidsvoll 1814s on Bøn Stadion 2005.

The Eidsvoll 1814s are an American football team based in Eidsvoll, Norway. They are currently members of the Eliteserien league, in turn a member of the Norwegian Federation of American Sports (NAIF). Their name is taken from the signing of the Constitution of Norway at Eidsvoll in 1814.

== History ==
Eidsvoll 1814s were founded in 1995 by Kenneth Andersen, Jarle Østhagen and Bård Aune and started play the following year as a Division II team. Going undefeated in league play during their first two seasons, the 1814s won back-to-back Division II championships. In 1998, they joined Division I where they lost in double-overtime to the Oslo Vikings in their first playoff appearance at that level. They won their first division I league championship in 2001.

In 2008, they were automatically qualified to play in the European Football League quarter finals.

== Head coaches ==
Name	Tenure
Vince McGee	1997–1998
Jan Johansson	1999
Vince McGee	2000
Dan McCarty	2001
Vince McGee	2002–2003
Mike Burton	2004–2005
William Miller	2006
Brian Cain	2007
Nick Evans	2008
William Miller	2009
Dax Michelina	2009
Aaron Jones	2010
Geoff Buffum	2013–2014
John Pate	2015
Greg Kleidon	2016
TJ Reap	2017
Michael Hall	2018–2020
Kris Ceballos	2021
Leif Oskar Lindvik	2022
Jenny Widding	2022–present

== Championships ==
=== League ===
- Eliteserien (Norwegian National Championship)
  - Winners (11): 2001, 2004, 2005, 2006, 2007, 2008, 2009, 2010, 2013, 2022, 2024
  - Runners-up: 1999, 2000, 2003, 2011, 2014, 2015, 2016, 2017, 2019, 2023
