= Gentofte Sportspark =

Multi-purpose stadium in Gentofte near Copenhagen, Denmark

- Interactive map of Gentofte Sportspark
- Former names: Gentofte Stadium (1942–2012)
- Location: Ved Stadion 10, 2820 Gentofte
- Coordinates: 55°45′29″N 12°31′38″E
- Owner: Gentofte Municipality
- Capacity: 15,000 (football stadium)
- Surface: Grass

Construction
- Opened: 27 September 1942

Tenants
- Hellerup IK (football); Jægersborg BK; Copenhagen Towers (American football); Gentofte BK (badminton)

Gentofte Sportspark (formerly Gentofte Stadion) is a multi-purpose stadium in Gentofte near Copenhagen, Denmark. The stadium holds 15,000 people. It is currently used mostly for football matches and is the home stadium of Hellerup IK. Other sports clubs based in the sports park include the ice hockey team Gentofte Stars and the badminton club Gentofte BK. The stadium has also been used for concerts.

== Location ==
Gentofte Sports Park occupies the triangular site between the Helsingør Motorway to the west, the S-train network's Hillerød radial to the east and Brogårdsvej to the south. The central artery of the sports park is Ved Stadion.

== History ==
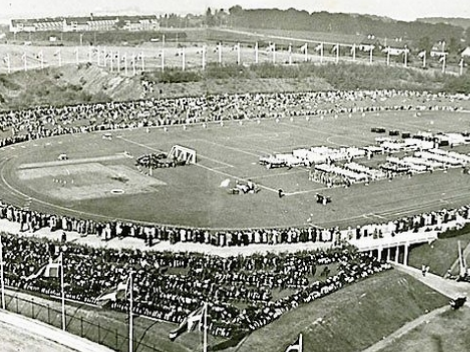
The inauguration of Gentofte Stadium on 27 September 1942

In 1920, Captain Holger Nielsen took over the post as supervisor of the gymnastics and swimming programmes at the municipality's schools. He became a driver force behind the construction of Gentofte Stadium. In 1921, Gentofte Municipality acquired Tjørnegården, a farm with a series of old clay pits located on its land. In 1936, an architectural competition for the design of a stadium at the site was launched. It was won by Arne Jacobsen. His proposal comprised the largest stadium in the Nordic countries but his winning proposal was strongly modified and only partially realized. The stadium was inaugurated on 27 September 1942. The inauguration ceremony was attended by 20,000 spectators.

A new tribune with room for 5,000 spectators was inaugurated in 1954. More football fields, an archery stadium and an ice skating rink was built were added in 1965. The original splans for indoor swimming and sports venues were not realized but Kildeskovshallen was built in 1969 and later expanded in 1970–1972. Facilities for skate boarding were built in 2010.

== Facilities ==
=== Stadium ===
The football stadium has room for 15,000 spectators. It is used by Hellerup IK and Jægersborg BK. The stadium is also used by the American football club Copenhagen Towers and for athletics.

The highest number of spectators registered at a football match is 13,500 spectators in 1985 at a match between Lyngby Boldklub and B 1903. On 22 October 1991 approximately 12,000 watched B 1903 defeat Bayern München 6–2 at Gentofte Stadium.

=== Gentoftehallen ===
Gentoftehallen (Ved stadion 14, 2820 Gentofte) comprises two venues, one for official matches and one for practice. It is used for volleyball, basketball, handball, badminton, futsal, gymnasticsand school sports.

The two venues contains a total of six basketball courses, seven vlooeyball courses and two handball courses. The venue for official matches has room for 1,500 spectators.

Clubs that use the venue include the badminton club Gentofte BK.

=== Ice skating rinks ===
Gentofte Sports Park has two indoor ice skating rinks and a separate curling venue. Hall 1 is used for official events but is also open to the public let out to schools. It is the home ground of the ice hockey team Gentofte Stars which plays in Metal Ligaen as well as the figure skating club GKF. Hall 2 is used for ice hockey and figure skating practice. The curling venue is located adjacent to Hall 2. It contains two curling courses.

=== Rollerskating Hall ===
Rulleskøjtehallen (Ved stadion 16, 2820 Gentofte) is used for roller hockey and roller skating. It has an area of c. 1317 square metres and is unheated. It is used by Gentofte Rulleskøjteklub (GRK). Roller skate rental is available.

=== Jägers Skatepark & Hall ===
Jägers Skatepark & Hall (Ved stadion 18, 2820 Gentofte) comprises facilities for indoor as well as outdoor skateboarding. The indoor venue has an area of 1,000 square metres.

== Concerts ==
Gentofte Stadion has also been the venue of many concerts, including;

- Genesis - Invisible Touch Tour - June 5, 1987
- Pink Floyd - A Momentary Lapse of Reason Tour - July 31, 1988
- Tina Turner - Foreign Affair: The Farewell Tour - May 22, 1990
- Prince & The New Power Generation - Nude Tour, with Mavis Staples - June 4, 1990
- ZZ Top - Recycler World Tour , with Bryan Adams - June 12, 1991
- AC/DC, Metallica, Pantera, Mötley Crüe, Queensrÿche & The Black Crowes - Monsters of Rock - August 10, 1991
- Michael Jackson - Dangerous World Tour - July 20, 1992 (Sold-out and attended by 30,000 spectators.)
- Metallica - Nowhere Else to Roam Tour, with The Cult & Suicidal Tendencies - May 28, 1993
- Guns N' Roses - Use Your Illusion Tour - June 8, 1993
- U2 - Zoo TV Tour, with PJ Harvey & Stereo MC's - July 27, 1993
- The Pussycat Dolls - Doll Domination Tour - August 22, 2009

== See also ==
- Kildeskovshallen
