= Nationalligaen =

American football league in Denmark

- Sport: American football
- Founded: 1988
- No. of teams: 4
- Country: Denmark
- Most recent champion: Søllerød Gold Diggers
- Most titles: Copenhagen Towers (12)
- Relegation to: Kvalligaen
- Website: DAFF

Nationalligaen (NL) is the top American football league in Denmark founded in 1988. It is organized by the Danish American Football Federation. The league finale and the winning trophy is called Mermaid Bowl.

The Copenhagen Towers won the 2024 finale for a record twelfth time, defeating the 89ers 33–14. Reigning champions are the Søllerød Gold Diggers who won the title 2025 and 2026.

== Teams in 2026 ==
- AaB 89ers
- Aarhus Tigers
- Copenhagen Towers
- Frederikssund Oaks
- Søllerød Gold Diggers
- Triangle Razorbacks

== Mermaid Bowl ==
The Mermaid Bowl is the DAFF championship game, the Danish equivalent of the NFL's Super Bowl. The name is taken from the famous Little Mermaid, a symbol of Denmark. The first final, in 1988, was not played under the Mermaid Bowl name and was won by the Copenhagen Vikings (later named the Copenhagen Towers).

#	Date	Winner	Runner-Up	Score	Venue
—	1988	Copenhagen Vikings	Odense Swans	33–6	
I	1989	Copenhagen Vikings	Odense Swans	17–13	
II	1990	Herning Hawks	Odense Swans	20–14	
III	1991	Aarhus Tigers	Odense Swans	27–0	
IV	1992	Copenhagen Towers	Herning Hawks	78–50	
V	1993	Copenhagen Towers	Odense Swans	48–33	
VI	1994	Copenhagen Towers	Herning Hawks	46–7	
VII	1995	Copenhagen Towers	Aarhus Tigers	35–20	
VIII	1996	Roskilde Kings	Copenhagen Towers	62–48	
IX	1997	Roskilde Kings	Kronborg Knights	56–37	
X	1998	Aarhus Tigers	Kronborg Knights	48–20	
XI	1999	Aarhus Tigers	Kronborg Knights	28–0	
XII	2000	Aarhus Tigers	Roskilde Kings	49–6	
XIII	2001	Roskilde Kings	Greve Monarchs	17–10	
XIV	2002	Avedøre Monarchs	Roskilde Kings	27–25	
XV	2003	Avedøre Monarchs	Roskilde Kings	28–14	
XVI	2004	Avedøre Monarchs	Herning Hawks	41–12	
XVII	2005	Roskilde Kings	Kronborg Knights	23–6	
XVIII	2006	Triangle Razorbacks	Kronborg Knights	21–16	
XIX	2007	Triangle Razorbacks	Avedøre Monarchs	32–20	
XX	2008	Triangle Razorbacks	Søllerød Gold Diggers	55–24	
XXI	October 3, 2009	Søllerød Gold Diggers	Triangle Razorbacks	10–0	
XXII	October 2, 2010	Søllerød Gold Diggers	Triangle Razorbacks	13–0	Farum Park, Farum
XXIII	October 8, 2011	Triangle Razorbacks	Søllerød Gold Diggers	35–31	Farum Park, Farum
XXIV	October 6, 2012	Triangle Razorbacks	Søllerød Gold Diggers	34–29	Vejle Stadium, Vejle
XXV	October 12, 2013	Copenhagen Towers	Triangle Razorbacks	28–21	AutoC Park, Randers
XXVI	October 11, 2014	Copenhagen Towers	Aarhus Tigers	26–3	AutoC Park, Randers
XXVII	October 10, 2015	Triangle Razorbacks	Søllerød Gold Diggers	21–17	Energi Viborg Arena, Viborg
XXVIII	October 8, 2016	Triangle Razorbacks	Copenhagen Towers	22–18	CASA Arena, Horsens
XXIX	October 7, 2017	Copenhagen Towers	Søllerød Gold Diggers	20–7	Harboe Arena, Slagelse
XXX	October 13, 2018	Copenhagen Towers	Triangle Razorbacks	23–22	Harboe Arena, Slagelse
XXXI	October 5, 2019	Triangle Razorbacks	Copenhagen Towers	20–14	Gladsaxe Stadium
—	2020	season abandoned because of the COVID-19 pandemic – no final played			
XXXII	October 9, 2021	Copenhagen Towers	Søllerød Gold Diggers	24–7	Vejle Atletikstadion, Vejle
XXXIII	September 24, 2022	Copenhagen Towers	Søllerød Gold Diggers	32–17	Blue Water Arena, Esbjerg
XXXIV	October 7, 2023	Copenhagen Towers	Søllerød Gold Diggers	50–36	Gladsaxe Stadium
XXXV	October 5, 2024	Copenhagen Towers	Aalborg 89ers	33–14	Gentofte Sportspark
XXXVI	October 4, 2025	Søllerød Gold Diggers	Aalborg 89ers	6–0	Vejle Atletikstadion, Vejle
XXXVII	October 3, 2026	Søllerød Gold Diggers	Copenhagen Towers	34–14	Gentofte Sportspark
