= Roebuck (surname) =

Roebuck is a surname. Notable people with this surname include:

- Alvah Curtis Roebuck (1864–1948), American businessman, co-founder of Sears, Roebuck and Company
- Arthur Roebuck (1878–1971), Canadian politician and lawyer
- Charlie Roebuck (born 1991), English cricketer
- Chris Roebuck, British economist
- Daniel Roebuck (born 1963), American television film actor, writer and producer
- Ed Roebuck (1931–2018), American baseball player and scout
- Ellie Roebuck (born 1999), English association football player
- Gene Roebuck (born 1947), American college sports coach
- James R. Roebuck Jr. (born 1945), American politician
- John Roebuck (1718–1794), English inventor
- John Arthur Roebuck (1802–1879), British politician and Member of Parliament
- Joseph Roebuck (born 1985), English swimmer
- Kristian Roebuck (born 1981), English badminton player
- Larrett Roebuck (1889–1914), English footballer
- Les Roebuck (1885–1973), Australian rules footballer and tennis player
- Marty Roebuck (born 1965), Australian rugby union footballer
- Nathan Roebuck (born 1999), English rugby league player
- Neil Roebuck (born 1969), English rugby league footballer of the 1980s and 1990s
- Nigel Roebuck (born 1946), English Formula One journalist
- Paul Roebuck (born 1963), English cricketer
- Peter Roebuck (1956–2011), English-Australian cricketer and journalist
- Roy Roebuck (1929–2023), British journalist, Member of Parliament and barrister
- Samuel Roebuck (1871–1924), British trade unionist
- Thomas Roebuck (1781–1819), British orientalist, translator, soldier and writer
- Tom Roebuck (born 2001), English rugby union player
- William Denison Roebuck (1851–1919), British malacologist
- William V. Roebuck (born 1954), American diplomat
- Disney Roebuck or Disney-Roebuck, British family whose members include:
  - Henry Disney Roebuck (18th-century), builder of "folly" Midford Castle
  - Francis Disney-Roebuck, "Captain Roebuck" (1819–1885), British Army officer and theatre manager in South Africa
  - Francis Disney-Roebuck (1846–1919), English cricketer and army officer
  - Claude Disney-Roebuck (1876–1947), English cricketer, army officer and actor

== See also ==
- John Arthur Roebuck Rudge (1837–1903), British scientific inventor
