= Roebuck =

Roebuck may refer to:

== Animals ==
- Roe buck or roebuck, a male roe deer

== People ==
- Roebuck (surname)
- Roebuck O'Shaughnessy (died 1762), Irish noble
- Pops Staples born Roebuck Staples (1914–2000), American gospel and R&B musician

== Places ==
=== Geography ===
- Roebuck, Dublin, a townland in south county Dublin, Ireland
- Roebuck, South Carolina, United States
- Roebuck Bay, Western Australia
- Roebuck Estate, Holyhead Anglesey

=== Structures ===
- Roebuck Castle, home of the School of Law at University College Dublin, Ireland
- The Roebuck, a Grade II listed public house at 50 Great Dover Street, Borough, London

== Other uses ==
- Roebuck, a character in Call of Duty: World at War
- Roebuck Wright, a character in The French Dispatch
- Roebuck (Wicca), tradition begun by Robert Cochrane
- Roebuck, an underwater drill in the movie Underwater
- Roebuck (ship), ships with the name
  - HMS Roebuck, the name of 14 ships of the Royal Navy
- Sears, Roebuck and Company, colloquially known as "Sears", an American chain of department stores founded by Richard Warren Sears and Alvah Curtis Roebuck
- "Roebuck", 2024 song by Previous Industries from the album Service Merchandise
