= Corporate leader =

Corporate leader may refer to:

- Management
- Entrepreneurial leadership
