= Thomas Campbell Foster =

Thomas Campbell Foster (1813 - 1 July 1882) was an English barrister and writer on law, shorthand and Ireland. His notable cases included leading the defence of Mary Ann Cotton in 1873 and the prosecution of Charles Peace at Leeds Assizes in 1879.

== Life ==
Born in Leeds to John Foster, he was called to the bar at Middle Temple in 1846 and practised on the northern circuit of England, before moving to the north-eastern one after the circuits were sub-divided. He stood as a candidate for Sheffield constituency in 1865 as a "determined personal opponent" of John Arthur Roebuck (one of its two existing MPs) but coming last out of four. He was appointed revising barrister for the boroughs of the West Riding in 1868, a post he held for seven years until his appointments as bencher of Middle Temple and Queen's Counsel. In 1874 he was made recorder of Warwick. He died at Orsett Terrace, Hyde Park after a long illness of the glands which had led him to retire from his circuit duties.

== Works ==
- Plain Instructions for the Attainment of an Improved, Complete, and Practical System of Shorthand, 1838.
- Letters on the Condition of the People of Ireland. Reprinted, with additions, from the “Times,” 1846
- A Review of the Law relating to Marriages within the Prohibited Degrees of Affinity, and of the Canons and Social Considerations by which that Law is supposed to be Justified, 1847
- A Treatise on the Writ of Scire Facias, 1851
- Reports of Cases decided at Nisi Prius and at the Crown Side on Circuit, and Select Decisions at Chambers (with N. F. Finlason), 1858–1867.
