= Roebuck (ship) =

Several vessels have been named Roebuck for the male roe deer:

- Roebuck (1794 ship) was built in New England. In 1795 she came to England, performed one voyage as a slave ship, and then returned to the United States.
- Roebuck (1799 ship) was built on the Thames in 1784, almost certainly under another name. She first appeared as Roebuck in 1799 sailing as a West Indiaman. Between 1800 and 1802 she made three voyages as a slave ship. She was condemned in 1806.
- TSS Roebuck (1897), sank in 1915
- TSS Roebuck (1925), scrapped in 1965

== See also ==
- HMS Roebuck – any one of 14 vessels of the British Royal Navy
- Roebuck (disambiguation)
