= The Nottingham Emmanuel School =

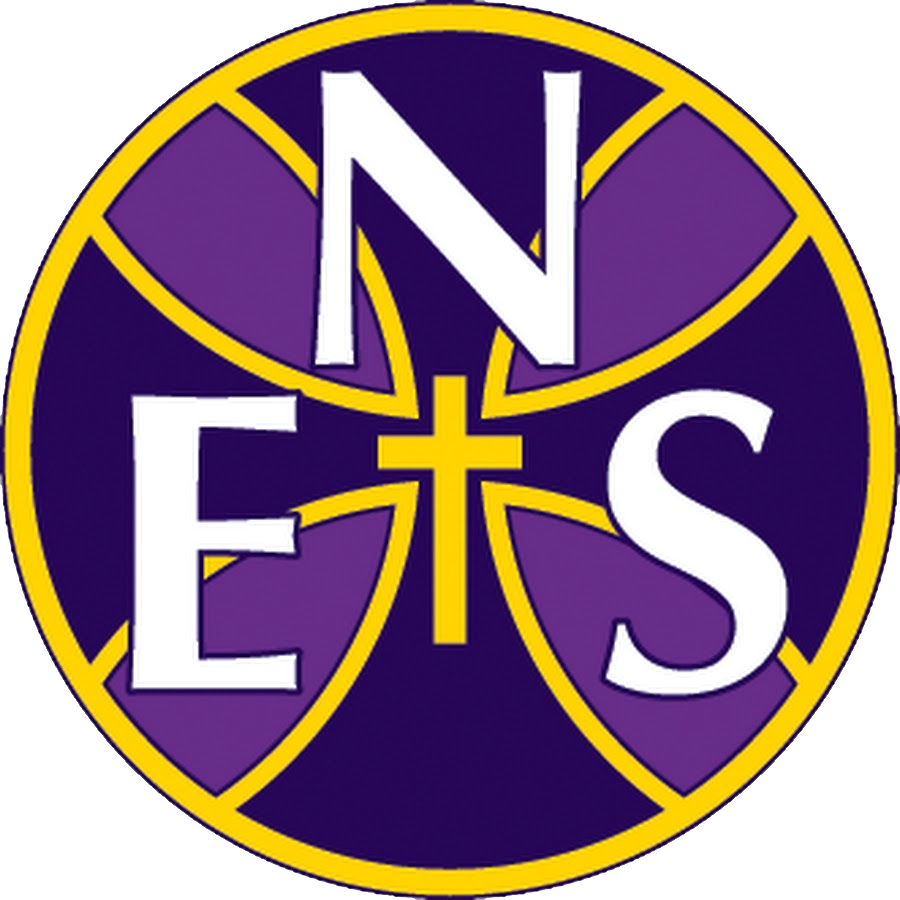
- The NES Current design

Location
- Gresham Park Road; West Bridgford, Nottinghamshire, NG69 4SN; England; 52.93163°N 1.1503°W

Information
- Type: Academy
- Motto: “I can do all things through Christ who strengthens me” Philippians 4:13
- Religious affiliation: Church of England
- Founder: Mr M Afaq, Mrs Henry Wright
- Department for Education URN: 139765 Tables
- Ofsted: Reports
- Chair: Richard Tanner
- Principal: Sandra Stapleton
- Gender: Coeducational
- Age: 11 to 19
- Enrolment: 1,087
- Houses: King Junior (Green), Romero (Red), Pullinger (Yellow), Booth (Blue) represents
- Colours: Magenta, Purple, Yellow, White
- Website: https://www.emmanuel.nottingham.sch.uk

The Nottingham Emmanuel School is a coeducational Church of England secondary school and sixth form with academy status, located near the banks of the river Trent in West Bridgford, Nottinghamshire, England. It is next to the former Great Central Main Line in the borough of Rushcliffe. It is a part of the Archway Learning Trust, joining in 2018, becoming the 5th school to join and the 7th in the family and it provides exceptional education and support for students and has a sixth form building .

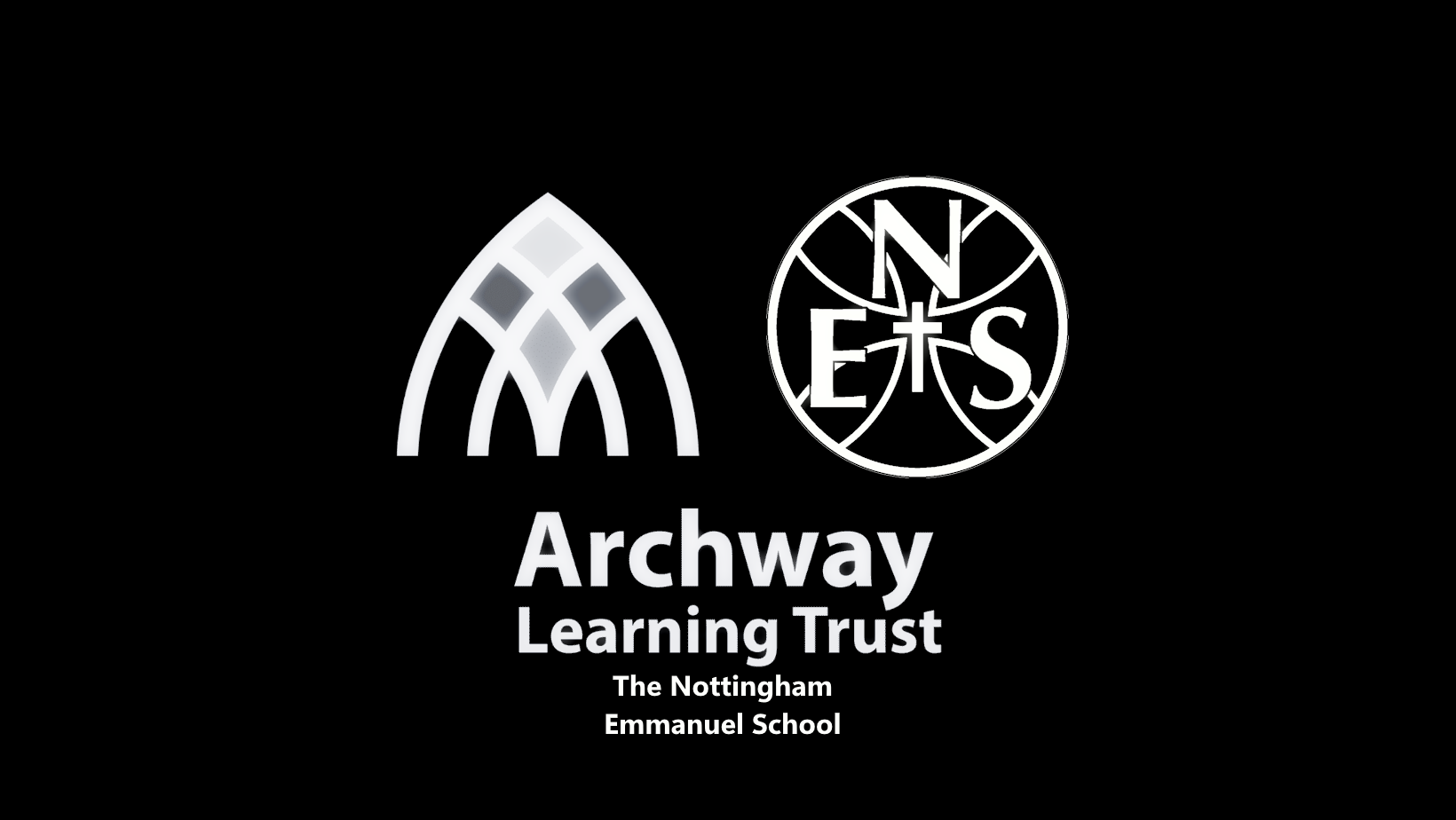
Archway Learning and Emmanuel - Monochrome Version

== History ==
The school began in September 2002 and had been using the old Wilford Meadows building until the arrival of its completed "new build" in late 2008. The first 6th-form students began their A-Level courses in September 2007.

In 2000 a project group was established to plan a programme of consultation, including a range of feasibility studies. There was very strong support from parents for the development of another church school and this proposal was also supported nationally through the recommendations made in the Dearing Report for new Church Aided Schools to be established. In 2001 a temporary governing body was convened to set up the school.

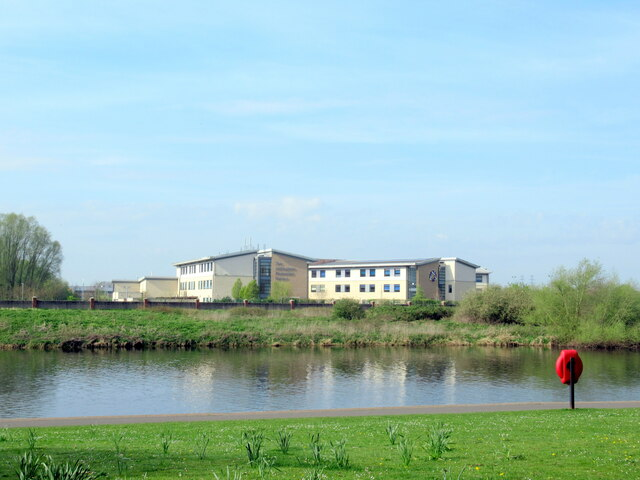
The construction of the Nottingham Emmanuel School over the River Trent.

The Nottingham Emmanuel School was so named because it reflects faith in God. The governors realised that a specifically Christian spiritual ethos in which other faith traditions were hosted within an Anglican framework was crucial to the overall purpose. This is reflected in the School's admission policy.

The school celebrated its official opening in 2002 with 180 students, and is now full in years 7, 8, 9, 10 and 11. In September 2006 the school welcomed its fifth year of intake, and this meant students for the first time were entered for public examinations at key stage 4. The school has a planned full size of 1150 students, including the sixth form in 2008–09.

The school converted to academy status on 1 June 2013.

=== Grammar school ===
The true origins of the school, in a convoluted and chequered history, start with the Mundella Grammar School, on Colygate Road in the Meadows, which opened in 1899. The school's name came from Anthony John Mundella, a Liberal MP for Sheffield, and Sheffield Brightside.

=== World War II ===
In September 1939 153 boys were evacuated to Stamford School, and 117 girls to Stamford High School. The boys and girls travelled by train on 5 September 1939. Some were confirmed by the Bishop of Lincoln at St Mary's Church on 7 December 1939.

The group returned by train on 12 March 1940, but Nottingham had not been bombed. The Nottingham Blitz was on 8 May 1941.

=== Comprehensive ===
The school became comprehensive in the 1970s, keeping its former name. These school buildings were demolished in 1985. The school transferred to the Roland Green Comprehensive School, which became the Wilford Meadows School. Owing to its low results, this school was closed, and re-opened as the Nottingham Emmanuel School.

== Academic performance ==
The school gets above average results for Nottingham at GCSE, and A-levels in the East Midlands and is "continued to be a good school" by Ofsted.

== Uniform ==
The uniform is a white shirt, black blazer with the new "NES" logo, and a purple tie, which has two stripes to represent the students' houses. Black, school-suitable shoes must also be worn. Male pupils must wear black trousers; female students may choose either a skirt or a pair of trousers.

=== Form tutors ===
Each tutor group, of mixed ability students, is attached to a year group and a house. The tutor group of approximately 30 students has its own form tutor, who is supported by two assistant tutors from Year 10. The form tutor is responsible for supporting the students in their care in all aspects of their school life – academic, social and personal. They closely monitor their academic progress in the National Curriculum through teacher assessment data and their rewards and behaviour record through the school's online information management system. Advice and guidance can be given over any matter that might affect the individual's work and personal development. The form tutor is the first point of contact for parents and students over any matter relating to school life and normally stays with their tutor group from year 7 to year 11 to ensure continuity of pastoral care and support throughout their school career.

=== Achievement and pastoral managers ===
All of the tutor groups and form tutors are managed by the achievement and pastoral manager. This person is responsible for co-ordinating the work of the year group and monitoring overall academic progress. The pastoral manager co-ordinates intervention programmes and ensures that the whole year group work together effectively and maintain high standards of behaviour. The achievement and pastoral manager is available to support parents and tutors in more serious matters of concern relating to any aspect of school life or when initial attempts to resolve issues with the tutor or subject teacher have not been successful.

=== Heads of house ===
The school has a house system; the houses are represented by colours: red, blue, yellow and green. This changed in September 2017 to King Junior (green), Romero (red), Pullinger (yellow) and Booth (blue) following a vote by students and staff of the respective houses. The new names bring inspiration to the students through usage of memorable characters from history: King Junior represents Martin Luther King Jr, Romero represents Óscar Romero, Pullinger represents Jackie Pullinger, and Booth represents Catherine Booth.

The houses are supposed to foster teamwork within them so that their students may work together, vying to be "the best house". This can be seen at the annual sports day.

=== Special educational needs ===
The special educational needs (SEN) co-ordinator is responsible for the leadership and management of special educational needs provision across the school. Specialist support for students is identified in collaboration with staff and parents, and, where appropriate, outlined in a student tracking document, which details the SEN profile of the student and tracks academic progress against agreed targets. This enables students and staff to work collectively on specific targets that can be monitored regularly.

== Notable former pupils ==
=== Mundella Grammar School ===
- Stephen Lowe, playwright
- Edward Middleditch, artist
- David Pleat, football player, manager and commentator
- Cecil Roberts, novelist
- Doug Scott, mountaineer
- Fred Simpson, Labour MP for Ashton-under-Lyne from 1935 to 1939
- Rae Woodland, soprano

=== The Nottingham Emmanuel School ===
- Rosie Bentham, actress
- Muhammad Afaq, built the school
