= A. J. Mundella =

British politician (1825–1897)

The Right Honourable A. J. Mundella
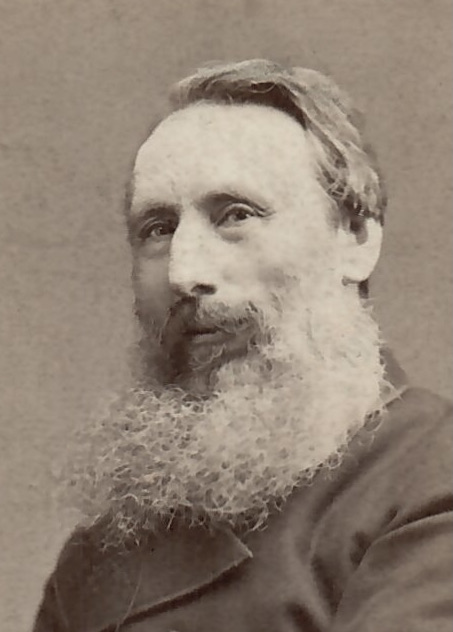
- Mundella, c. 1885

President of the Board of Trade
- In office 17 February 1886 – 20 July 1886
- Monarch: Queen Victoria
- Prime Minister: William Ewart Gladstone
- Preceded by: Hon. Edward Stanhope
- Succeeded by: Hon. Frederick Stanley
- In office 18 August 1892 – 28 May 1894
- Monarch: Queen Victoria
- Prime Minister: William Ewart Gladstone; The Earl of Rosebery
- Preceded by: Sir Michael Hicks Beach, Bt
- Succeeded by: James Bryce

Personal details
- Born: 28 March 1825 Leicester, Leicestershire
- Died: 21 July 1897 (aged 72) London
- Party: Liberal
- Spouse: Mary Smith
- Known for: Establishing compulsory elementary education; pioneering industrial arbitration and conciliation; the Children's Charter (1889); early supporter of women's suffrage

Anthony John Mundella PC (28 March 1825– 21 July 1897) was an English manufacturer and later a Liberal Party MP and Cabinet Minister who sat in the House of Commons of the United Kingdom from 1868 to 1897. He served under William Ewart Gladstone as Vice-President of the Committee of the Council on Education from 1880 to 1885 and as President of the Board of Trade in 1886 and from 1892 to 1894. As education minister he established universal compulsory education in Britain and played the major part in building the state education system. At the Board of Trade he was instrumental in the reduction of working hours and the raising of minimum ages in the employment of children and young people. He was among the first to prove the effectiveness of arbitration and conciliation in industrial relations. He also brought in the first laws to prevent cruelty to children. He was also an early supporter of women's suffrage. His political achievements in the late Victorian age are said to have anticipated 20th century society.

== Early life ==
Anthony John Mundella was born in Leicester, England in 1825. He was the first of five children of Antonio Mondelli (later known as Anthony Mundella), a refugee from Lombardy of uncertain background, and his wife Rebecca Allsopp of Leicester. At the time of Mundella's birth, his father was a poorly paid trimmer in the hosiery trade. (Note: Mundella's father later became a successful cotton and wool waste merchant.) His mother made lace on a frame in their home and was regarded as adept at this work but, nonetheless, she too was poorly paid and after rent for housing and for the lace frame there was invariably little left to live on.

Mundella was christened on 15 August 1826 at the Great Meeting Unitarian chapel in Leicester. His granddaughter maintained that he was named Antonio Giovanni but the Great Meeting baptismal register confirms that he was christened Anthony John.

Though from a Catholic and nonconformist background, he attended the Church of England school of St Nicholas in Leicester, an establishment maintained by the National Society for Promoting Religious Education to provide elementary education for children from poor homes, until the age of nine. Though he rebelled against the catechism and disliked the creed, describing them in later life as "my especial abomination", Mundella remained loyal to his early education in Anglicanism for the rest of his life. Outside school, his mother, with her wide knowledge of English literature, particularly Shakespeare, instilled in his mind a love of the beautiful in nature, in literature, and in art. Because of the family's then abject financial circumstances, when Rebecca Mundella's eyesight worsened and she could no longer work at lacemaking the boy had to be withdrawn from school so that he could earn money to help the family. At nine, he started work in a printing office as a printer's devil, an opportunity used by him to extend his education. At eleven he was apprenticed to William Kempson, whose business made footwear, hosiery and haberdashery.

From his father, and the exiled Italians who occasionally visited the family home, Mundella acquired at an early age what was described as "a kind of strange unconventional political education". At fifteen he became politically engaged and, inspired by the local Chartist leader, Thomas Cooper, enrolled as a Chartist, becoming increasingly involved in the movement. He became adept at writing political ballads and while still fifteen heard his compositions sung on the streets and at political meetings. At the same age he made his first political speech, in support of the Charter. He was further politically inspired by the arrival in Leicester of Richard Cobden on his nationwide campaign for the repeal of the Corn Laws, and was always active in advocating the causes of the working classes.

Mundella had always been a regular Sunday School scholar and as he grew older he became a teacher, then secretary, and ultimately superintendent of a large, poor Sunday School in Sanvey Gate in Leicester.

At the age of eighteen Mundella left Kempson's to become a journeyman, then an overseer (in which post he earned £200 a year and a commission on profits) and ultimately manager of a large warehouse set up by another hosiery manufacturing business in Leicester, Harris & Hamel. Richard Harris was a prominent Liberal and Chartist in the city. Mundella prospered and, while still eighteen, he married. He worked for Harris for three years, until he was 22, and while there the firm experimented seriously and secretly with machinery driven by steam power. Mundella was not technically minded, though his experience at Harris's with mechanical experimentation helped to form his abiding interest and fascination in new steam-powered hosiery-making machinery. He was one of the first industrialists in the Midlands to realise that steam power was something far more than a means to great wealth. He believed that it could be "so applied and developed as to lift the mass of workers out of serfdom".

== Manufacturing career ==
In 1848 Mundella was offered a partnership by old-established hosiery manufacturers, Hine & Co of Nottingham, who needed help to construct and open a large new factory. He became a partner in the company, which soon became known as Hine & Mundella.

For the next fifteen years Mundella devoted his energy to reinventing the mechanics of a hosiery industry which for the most part relied on old-style mechanical stocking frames operated by perennially poor framework-knitters in their own homes. (Note: The stocking frame had been invented in 1589.) He pioneered many changes, including new machines which produced tubular knitting rather than the stocking-frame's straight knit. Mundella had long maintained that the best machines in the hosiery trade were "principally the inventions of working men". Not by his own invention, but by encouraging inventors within the company (many of them loom operators) and sharing patents with them, Mundella was able to develop plentiful new hosiery-making machinery, a lot of it steam-driven, including a technological revolution: a machine which for the first time enabled a stocking to be made and fully fashioned automatically without stopping the action. The result was stockings made a hundred times faster than they could be by the framework knitters.

Mundella built large new premises for the company in 1851, the first steam-operated hosiery factory in Nottingham. It had wide and spacious workrooms, was lit entirely by daylight and gas jets, and had the finest machinery. By 1857 Hine and Mundella were employing 4,000 workers who were well paid, partly because by attracting good operatives Mundella hoped they would use their intelligence and inventiveness to suggest improvements in the way they worked. Improved conditions, Mundella observed, brought enhanced loyalty.

There was a setback in 1859 when Hine & Mundella's factory was damaged by fire, but it was soon rebuilt and returned to operation with the advantage of newer and more powerful machines, in large part paid for by the company's insurers. Hine and Mundella continued to prosper. They opened factories in Loughborough in Leicestershire, England in 1859 and Chemnitz, Saxony in 1866. A London warehouse at the centre of the textile trade in Wood Street was acquired.

In 1860, a series of strikes and lock-outs hit Nottingham's hosiery business. The inadequate wages of home framework-knitters compared to those of the factory operatives led to demands for higher pay (although Mundella's employees were not involved). Mundella organised a conference between workers and the employers. He had to contend with suspicious employers and with powerful trade unionists, and reconcile the penurious framework-knitters with the comparatively well-paid and skilled factory workers. He proposed that the workers should have the wages they demanded and also that a board of arbitration (the Nottingham Board of Arbitration and Conciliation for the Hosiery Trade) composed of both employers and workers should be established to prevent further strikes by fixing the price for handwork and preventing disputes by constant conference between both sides. The essence was that prevention of strife was better than subsequent remedy.

Mundella's principle of conciliation was not entirely original; other such boards of conciliation or arbitration had been set up, mostly successfully, in a few other trades but none of them had been established in an industry as antagonistic and complex with technological change as the hosiery trade. Mundella was the first to prove that the principle worked in an industry of much complexity with the aim of, rather than fighting fires, preventing fires starting in the first place. It was hailed as a success and was adopted not only in other parts of the country, but also in continental Europe and in the United States.

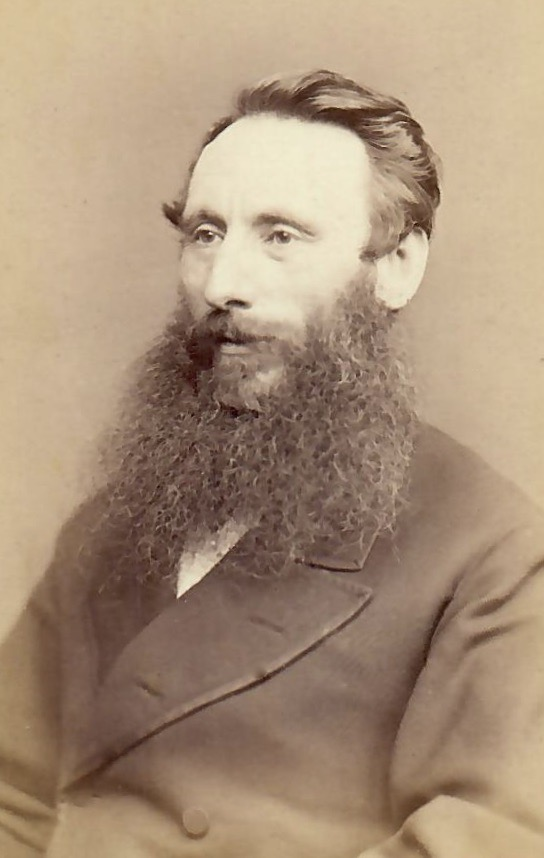
Carte de visite of Mundella, c1865

In 1863 the stress of business became so great that Mundella's health broke down. He went to Italy and spent two years recuperating. In his absence the firm of Hine & Mundella was converted into a limited liability company, the Nottingham Hosiery Manufacturing Company. The firm continued to expand, developing further interests in Saxony, and Boston in the United States.

Mundella had made a success out of the business. When he joined Hine & Co in 1848 the annual turnover was £18,000 (equivalent to £1,900,000 in 2025); when he left the firm in 1873 (finding it impossible to live in London as an MP and manage a business in Nottingham) the annual turnover was £500,000 (equivalent to £47,000,000 in 2025).

Mundella was a prominent and popular public figure in Nottingham and was an active force in his local Liberal Party, becoming sheriff of Nottingham in 1852, at the age of 28. In 1856 he was elected a town councillor and helped to set up the Nottingham Chamber of Commerce. From 1859, at the time of increased fear of an invasion by France, he was one of the founding members of the local volunteer corps, the Robin Hood Rifles, joining in May 1859 and being promoted to lieutenant in June and captain five months later.

Aside from local political action, Mundella's business experience showed him that progress in industry depended on reciprocal understanding between workers and employers, and that progress generally required significant improvements in the nation's education system, including technical training. He also recognised that very young children could not be properly educated if they were spending their time working in factories. When travelling in continental Europe on business and on personal relaxation, Mundella saw how superior the education systems of other countries were, particularly in Switzerland and the German states, and was dismayed at the comparative shortcomings of the English system. He knew that achieving the required progress in these matters would involve collective effort and increasing state intervention. At the same time, his business experience, arising from his working past, confirmed his belief in the desirability, indeed necessity, of trade unions. The opportunity to put his beliefs into action appeared in 1868.

== Election to Parliament ==
After Mundella's 1863 success in arbitrating the Nottingham industrial strife he was invited by many English and Welsh towns to expound on the system of arbitration and to help settle a number of labour conflicts. Outbreaks of violence, including explosions and murders, in the Sheffield steel industry led to the 1867 Royal Commission on Trade Unions. Mundella showed the commission that unions could play a positive part in industrial relations, and that working men could be trusted. In 1868 he was invited to address a joint meeting in Sheffield of the organised trades and the local branch of the Reform League. The leaders of his audience were so inspired by his speech that they assured him of their support if he were to stand for the Liberal Party in the Sheffield constituency in the forthcoming general election.

Mundella had already stated that he "did not feel obliged to go on toiling to amass a great fortune, but was justified in giving up commerce to devote himself to political life and his love of beautiful things". He agreed to stand and was formally adopted as a Liberal candidate on 20 July 1868.

The election in Sheffield was a long and bitterly fought contest. Mundella suffered much abuse. There were attacks on his Italian ancestry; though he was not Jewish he was lampooned by antisemitic cartoonists because of his looks; his morality in business was questioned. But benefitting from the Reform Act 1867, which had enfranchised a large number of male householders for the first time, Mundella prevailed in Sheffield. He was to represent the seat, and its successor, Sheffield Brightside, until his death nearly thirty years later.

== Political career ==
Mundella took his seat in the House of Commons as part of the Liberal Party majority of 116. Considered a pioneer of industrial arbitration and as an expert on social matters and perceived as a hard worker by his peers, he immediately found himself to be one of the most highly regarded MPs of the new intake.

Mundella was chosen to second the reply to the Speech from the Throne and in doing so made his maiden speech on 16 February 1869. The prime minister, William Ewart Gladstone, warmly congratulated him on his speech. In the middle of March Mundella's stock rose higher when his board of arbitration was commended in the newly published Report of the Royal Commission on Trade Unions.

=== Backbencher ===
Mundella's main concerns on joining the House were trade union reform and the need for free, compulsory schooling and for technical training. Trade unionism had no greater friend than Mundella. He was a believer in the right of working men and women to combine to protect their interests, and much of his energy in Parliament was devoted to securing the same rights for them as were enjoyed by their employers. In 1869 Mundella began to plan a private member's bill to legalise the unions and give them financial security. Though the bill did not proceed, his efforts did secure a temporary government bill which gave protection to trade union funds and two years later led to the Trade Union Act 1871 which legalised trade unions and protected their funds by legal registration.

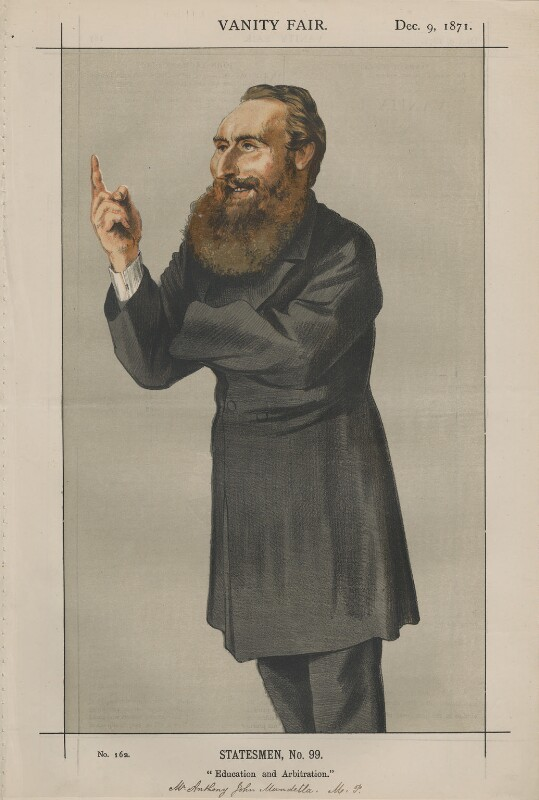
Anthony John Mundella by Coïdé (James Jacques Tissot). A chromolithograph published in Vanity Fair, 9 December 1871

Mundella’s first moves in the House regarding education were strongly to support the passing of the Elementary Education Act 1870. His speech on the second reading of the bill did much to enhance his parliamentary reputation. Though the act established local education authorities and authorised public money for school improvements, it did not meet with Mundella’s complete approval as it introduced neither free nor compulsory schooling (except in a tentative, experimental way through the by-laws which school boards were empowered to make), but he was anxious to take what parliament was willing to give rather than reject it because it was not good enough.

The trade unions and education were not Mundella’s sole concerns in his early years as a backbencher. He attacked the War Office for its antiquated system for issuing army contracts, and advocated short army and navy service, more volunteers and better organisation. He joined in an attempt to modernise the patent laws, which for a long time had been his concern as an industrialist. He spoke against what he called the "absurdity" of the complicated and inconsistent postal rates. He denounced the obsolete game laws, whose punishments for poaching jailed many thousands of men. And he attacked the inconsistent treatment of men and women in the Contagious Diseases Acts of the 1860s which in ports and garrison towns subjected female prostitutes, and those suspected of being such, to arrest, inspection, and (if they were found to be infected) incarceration for up to one year, while no provision was made for the examination of their male customers. He also pressed for the legal age of sexual intercourse to be raised to 16, since over 25 per cent of those with sexually transmitted infections were under that age.

Mundella was also greatly concerned at the employment of children of very young ages, and how their presence at work would make compulsory elementary education impossible. In 1871 he put forward a measure to control the employment of children in the manufacture of bricks and tiles. His move was welcomed so readily that it was incorporated into the government's Factory and Workshop Act 1871 (34 & 35 Vict. c. 104). As a result, the employment of girls under sixteen and boys under ten in brick and tile yards was prohibited.

Mundella's long-established interest in arbitration resulted in his Arbitration (Masters and Workmen) Act 1872 (35 & 36 Vict. c. 46) (commonly known as Mundella's Act) which made voluntary agreements between managers and workers mutually binding. In the same year he aided the passage of the Coal Mines Regulation Act 1872 (35 & 36 Vict. c. 76), paying particular attention to the clauses restricting the working hours of women and children. He continued his campaign for fewer hours for women and children with the introduction of a nine-hours factory bill in 1872 but it made slow progress and in the summer of 1873, due to opposition from manufacturers, it was withdrawn.

Mundella's perennial concern for children also led him to introduce, in 1873, a bill for the protection of children against people who, being in charge of them, had been convicted of violence against them.

Mundella was an early and consistent supporter of women's suffrage. In February 1872 he was listed among the members of Parliament who had joined the Central Committee of the National Society for Women's Suffrage. He voted for the successive Women's Disabilities (Removal) bills in the divisions of 1871, 1872, 1875 and 1876, each of which was defeated.

=== Opposition backbencher ===
In the general election of 1874, the Liberal Party was defeated, but Mundella continued his parliamentary campaigns from the opposition backbenches and reintroduced his nine-hours bill. The Conservative government, harvesting the fruits of Mundella's three years' hard work on his bill, introduced their own factory bill which was designed to achieve much the same aims. The subsequent Factory Act 1874 (37 & 38 Vict. c. 44) established a ten-hour day for women and children in textile factories. It was widely recognised in the textile districts that it was Mundella's efforts which had secured its passing.

Mundella was also praised – this time by the trade union leadership – for his opposition backbench role in amending and enabling the passing of, firstly, the Employers and Workmen Act 1875 which replaced the repressive Master and Servant Acts, and, secondly, the passing of the Conspiracy, and Protection of Property Act 1875 which, combined with the repeal of the much-hated Criminal Law Amendment Act 1871, released workers from the severe penalties which were aimed solely at them. Both acts together decriminalised the work of trade unions.

To Mundella at this time was also the credit for his bill instituting a closed season from 15 March to 15 June for freshwater fish. (Note: Encouragement for the freshwater fish Bill had come from Mundella's own Sheffield constituency. The previous twenty years had seen an enormous expansion in the number of anglers. In 1878 Sheffield alone had 211 angling clubs, with 8,000 members, and there was much concern about over-fishing, particularly in the breeding period.) Known officially as the Freshwater Fisheries Act 1878 (41 & 42 Vict. c. 39), and colloquially amongst anglers as the Mundella Act, it became law in 1878.

In 1877 Mundella sponsored a bill to abolish the property qualification for standing for local office, pointing out that 80 to 90 per cent of the voters in his constituency were disqualified from being councillors and yet were the first to be pressured by rises in rates. The bill found little traction in the House and each time it reappeared in the period from 1877 to 1879 it was defeated. The Conservatives finally passed the measure in 1880.

=== Vice-President of the Committee of the Council on Education ===
The Liberals returned to power in 1880 with a large majority and Gladstone, recognising the younger man's expertise in the field of education reform, appointed him Vice-President of the Committee of the Council on Education (in other words, Secretary of State for Education). At the same time Mundella was appointed a privy councillor. (Note: Gladstone also favoured Mundella because of his support for Irish home rule, Mundella being prepared to support any measures which would tranquillise Ireland.) When Queen Victoria received his name from the prime minister she described him in her diary as "Mr. Mundella (one of the most violent radicals)”. She wrote that on disapprovingly remarking to Gladstone about Mundella's appointment "Mr. Gladstone praised him very much, saying he was a very religious man, very much for religious education, and never said anything offensive". At the same time, Mundella was also appointed the fourth Charity Commissioner for England and Wales.

Despite being junior to the Lord President of the Council Mundella was in charge of education, and he was now positioned to achieve a number of his aims, in particular that of compulsory elementary education. He set to work with vigour, despite strong opposition. Referring to Mundella's researches into schooling in continental Europe, The Times stated that "compulsory education might do for the Saxons, but would never be endured by the Anglo-Saxons". To those organisations and people who maintained that compulsion was un-English Mundella replied that it was "peculiarly English to be content to be in ignorance". Immediately on reaching office Mundella introduced a bill to complete the system of compulsion to attend school, which had not been achieved by previous acts. The Mundella Act (another act credited to his name), properly known as the Elementary Education Act 1880 (43 & 44 Vict. c. 23), which became law only four months after the Liberals returned to power, established the means to enforce that all children would be sent to school.

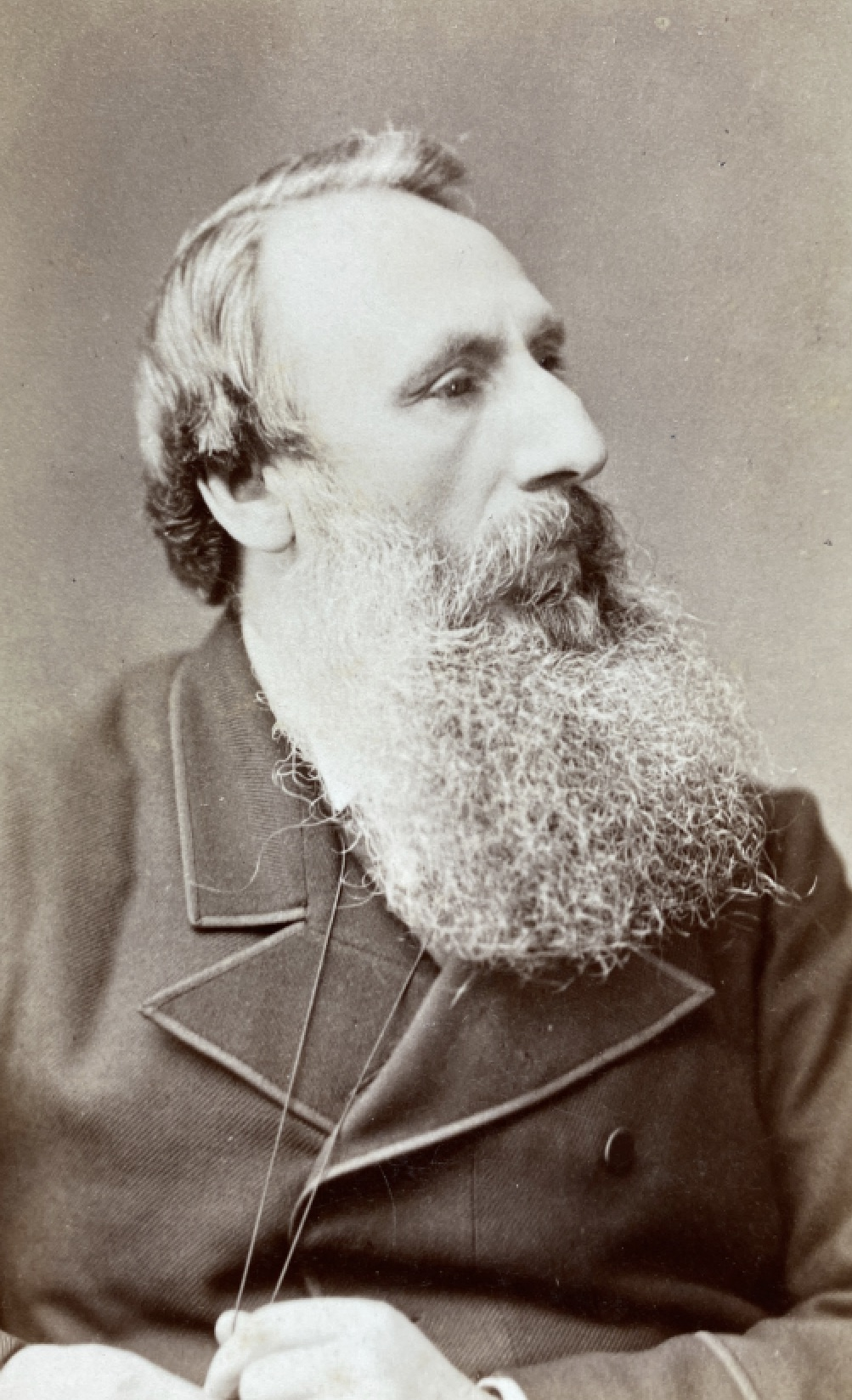
A. J. Mundella c. 1885

Mundella then set in motion the reorganisation of technical education. He had always taken an interest in higher and technical education, as well as in art schools and other forms of art culture, and they had invariably secured his sympathy and aid. As his first move in higher education, Mundella formed a single institution of the scientific schools at South Kensington in London, establishing the Normal School of Science and Royal School of Mines in October 1881.

Mundella appointed a departmental committee to investigate and make recommendations on higher education in Wales. The committee reported in 1881 and urged the immediate expansion of the Welsh intermediate schools and the establishment of university colleges in Cardiff and Bangor. Mundella further instituted a Royal Commission to examine foreign technical education and compare it with that available in England.

Mundella's responsibilities also included the further development of the South Kensington Museum (later the Victoria and Albert Museum), which as a lover of art he found to be an enjoyable part of his labours.

Mundella's educational code of 1882, which became known as the "Mundella Code," marked a new departure in the regulation of public elementary schools, their curricula and how they were taught, and the conditions under which government grants were made. By 1883 money was made available to allow the code to operate. Mundella improved the inspection of schools, including employing some women inspectors, and insisting that the health and mental capacity of children should be taken into consideration when examining their learning progress. He also arranged beneficial change in teacher training. There were accusations that the strictness of the code was harsh and was causing children to overwork. To this the medical journal The Lancet declared: "The educational system is not overworking children but demonstrating that they are underfed. This conclusion roused Mundella to urge local government to provide cheap meals for children.

While in England and Wales, endowments for higher education schools were being surveyed and where necessary reformed, no such action was taking place in Scotland. Mundella introduced bills to overhaul the Scottish endowments and extend compulsory elementary education to Scotland.

Mundella tried to modernise the Committee of the Council on Education by proposing the institution of an education department headed by a minister with a position in the cabinet, and the setting up of a department of agriculture which would take over his veterinary responsibilities (part of the education portfolio), but he was forestalled by the opposition of the Lord President of the Council.

In May 1885 Mundella was able to begin the process of introducing a measure to promote intermediate education in Wales, but on 9 June 1885 Gladstone resigned and as a result Mundella was forced to leave the vice-presidency. His Welsh legislation fell at the dissolution of parliament.

=== Opposition frontbencher ===
In the General Election of October 1885, Mundella stood for the new constituency of Brightside, one of Sheffield's five parliamentary divisions. He was elected with a healthy majority, but nationally the general election was a stalemate, and the Conservatives took office with the help of Charles Stewart Parnell and his Irish Parliamentary Party, which held the balance of power. Mundella was again in opposition, but kept his place on the Liberal frontbench. Gladstone returned to the prime ministership barely three months later in January 1886 and after briefly considering Mundella for the post of Chancellor of the Exchequer he instead elevated him to the cabinet as President of the Board of Trade.

=== President of the Board of Trade (first term) ===
In the short period before the next general election Mundella had little time at the Board of Trade to effect major legislative improvements but he was able to introduce a number of administrative changes.

He ensured that consular reports of trade and the trade requirements of different countries of the world should be published and available at a low price instead of being lost among general Foreign Office papers. He established a labour statistics bureau to allow information to be published and disseminated to the labouring class. He expanded the board to include a fisheries department, previously the realm of three different government departments, to look after both sea and inland fisheries. (Note: The fisheries department was later united with the agriculture department set up in 1899 at Mundella's instigation, though after his death.)

There had long been disputation over the matter of railway freight charges, with the railway companies' trade and agricultural customers implacably opposed to the high prices charged for the movement of goods. As a means to secure a just and equitable re-assessment of the charges throughout Britain, Mundella introduced his railway and canal traffic bill, which would hand control over the railways to the Board of Trade, including the power to enforce reductions in charges. Mundella met vehement opposition from the railway companies and their shareholders, who were fearful that there would be a fall in their profits of up to 50 per cent and a destruction of the value of railway property.

They were further angered by Mundella's introduction of a railway regulation bill which sought to impose better braking and other safety devices. Opposition to the railway and canal traffic bill rode on the back of the then widespread and equally vehement opposition in the House to Irish home rule. In a division on the Irish matter, Gladstone's government fell, and with it Mundella's attempted reform of the railways. (Note: The Railway and Canal Traffic Act 1888 (51 & 52 Vict. c. 25), similar to Mundella's, and with his encouragement from the opposition benches, became law under the Conservatives in 1888.)

=== Opposition frontbencher ===
Mundella's short period in charge of the Board of Trade ended on 30 July 1886 and in the general election in August the Conservatives regained power. From the opposition frontbench Mundella again campaigned for increased technical education among working people. With others, he was instrumental in inaugurating the National Association for the Promotion of Technical Education. The association became a force behind educational development, including secondary as well as technical education. Mundella also presided over the new National Education Association formed to promote a "free progressive system of national education, publicly controlled and free from sectarian interest" by publicising and advancing the School Board system and undermining denominational and private schools.

In 1888 Mundella introduced a bill for the prevention of cruelty to children. Due to opposition, progress of the bill was slow, with Mundella speaking 65 times in committee. The ensuing Prevention of Cruelty to, and Protection of, Children Act 1889 (52 & 53 Vict. c. 44) (commonly known as the Children's Charter) was the first act of Parliament to outlaw cruelty to children. It enabled the state to intervene in relations between parents and children, made it an imprisonable crime to neglect or ill-treat children, and outlawed the employment of children under the age of 10. Mundella regarded this Act as one of his greatest successes.

In 1890 Mundella became chairman of the Trade and Treaties Committee, responsible for keeping the Board of Trade informed on expiring treaties and new tariffs and duties. In 1891 and 1892, on the urging of Gladstone, he became an opposition frontbench representative on the Royal Commission on Labour. He chaired the section dealing with conditions in the chemical, building, textile, clothing and miscellaneous trades. As such, he was able to institute the appointment of four women inspectors to examine the position of women in industry.

=== President of the Board of Trade (second term) ===
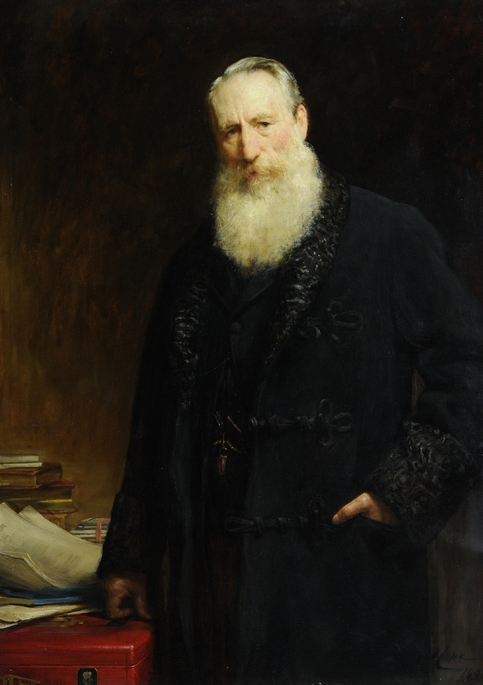
Mundella by Arthur Stockdale Cope, 1894

In the 1892 general election Mundella retained his seat of Sheffield Brightside with an increased majority and the Liberal Party formed the government. Mundella returned to the cabinet and to the presidency of the Board of Trade.

There Mundella again faced the railway companies and their shareholders, as the agricultural lobby and businesses were still anxious to see reduced freight charges. Cautious of raising the ire of the railway companies again, in 1893 Mundella set up a committee to look into the charges. He also enabled the Railway Regulation Act 1893 (56 & 57 Vict. c. 29), also known as the Railway Servants (Hours of Labour) Act, which allowed railway employees to reduce their working hours.

Early in 1893, the Bureau of Labour Statistics which Mundella set up in his first term as trade minister was expanded into a labour department, separate from the Board of Trade. This department published a regular Labour Gazette to ensure that information about labour was popularised in order to reach the working classes.

In 1893 there was a lock-out of miners in the Midlands, with nearly 320,000 men who were objecting to a reduction in pay being thrown out of work. Mundella encouraged conciliation and as a result the coal strike was settled. The conflict encouraged Mundella to introduce a bill to enable the establishment of local boards of conciliation and arbitration whenever and wherever they might be required. (Note: Mundella's bill to establish the local boards eventually became law under the Conservatives as the Conciliation Act 1896 (59 & 60 Vict. c. 30), also known as the Conciliation and Arbitration Act.)

Mundella enabled three separate maritime reforms. The North Sea Fisheries Act 1893 (56 & 57 Vict. c. 17) ratified the convention between the countries bordering the North Sea fishing areas to deal with floating alcohol "shops" which supplied fishermen with liquor. An improvement in the way merchant seamen were paid their wages at the end of a voyage ensured they did not have to linger for long periods in the seaports rather than returning home, thereby reducing prostitution in the ports. A merchant shipping bill was introduced to halt the undermanning of ships.

Concerned by the annual returns of railway accidents and deaths furnished by the Board of Trade, Mundella appointed two railway men to inquire into the accidents and their causes, and to find means to increase safety.

Mundella's stock was now high. Early in 1894 Gladstone wrote of him: "He ... has done himself much credit in the present government".

=== Resignation ===
In 1869 Mundella had joined the board of the New Zealand Loan and Mercantile Agency Company. (Note: The New Zealand Loan and Mercantile Agency Company made advances to sheep-farming colonists in New Zealand and Australia on the security of their land and produce, and helped market that produce in Britain.) It was a successful venture and Mundella's pecuniary interest prospered. Under newly established rules, on becoming president of the Board of Trade in 1892 he relinquished all his directorships and thereafter had no control over the company's activities. In 1893, as a result of an economic downturn, the company was forced into liquidation and became the subject of a Board of Trade inquiry. Though Mundella was no longer a director and was innocent of any fault, a conflict of interest existed because the final decision on what further proceedings should follow a public investigation in court (in which Mundella gave evidence) would have to be made by Mundella himself as president of the Board of Trade. He was compromised, and his role as president became unsustainable.

Mundella tendered his resignation to Lord Rosebery, by then prime minister, who requested him to withdraw it. Mundella insisted upon it and his resignation took effect on 12 May 1894. On 24 May he addressed the House of Commons on the matter. The magazine Punch wrote: "The House felt that here was a good man suffering with adversity. That it was undeserved, had swooped down, and blighted temporarily an honourable career when it seemed to have reached its serener heights, made the calamity none the less hard to bear. Mundella comported himself with the dignity that commanded the respect of the House. (He) sat down amid cheering on both sides".

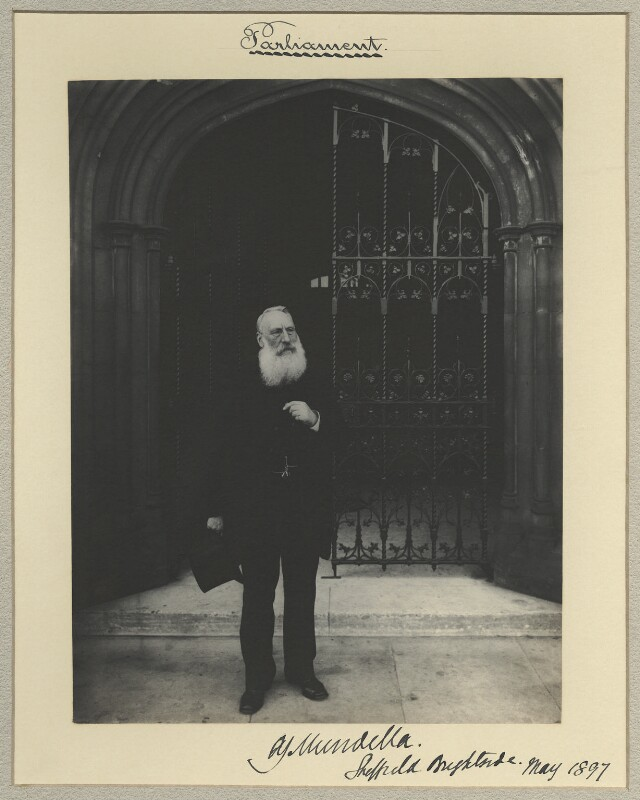
Mundella at the House of Commons by John Benjamin Stone, 1897

Mundella wrote to his sister Theresa: "I was received with loud cheering when I entered the House, when I rose to address it, and the loudest from all sides when I sat down. Men crowded round me all night to shake hands with me, and all my colleagues said I had done it so admirably and with so much dignity" There were tributes from Gladstone and Rosebery (the latter insisting that it was a "source of grief and weakness" to the government to be deprived of his "great" services), and hundreds of resolutions of sympathy from workers all over the country reached him, thanking him for his life-long services to labour. He was not to return to ministerial power, and served on the backbenches until the general election of 1895.

=== Government backbencher ===
In the year following his resignation, Mundella arbitrated successfully in the Hanley pottery dispute in March 1895 and was intensively occupied as chairman of the committee examining the poor law schools in London.

=== Opposition frontbencher ===
The general election of July 1895 saw the Conservatives win with an overall majority of 152 and the Liberal Party were back in opposition. Mundella, still esteemed by his constituents, was returned unopposed for Sheffield Brightside, and his colleagues in the House recalled him to the opposition frontbench. From that position, despite his age, he continued his fight for his favoured causes. He strongly opposed the education bills of 1896 and 1897 which he saw as destructive of his education policy, and he complained that the compulsory clauses of his education Act were scarcely enforced so that nearly one-fifth of the potential school population was absent. The result, he pointed out, was widespread illiteracy among those of school-leaving age.

Mundella's final utterance in the House, after 3,280 vocal contributions over nearly thirty years as an MP, was a brief interjection in the debate on the second reading of the education (Scotland) bill on 1 July 1897.

== Death ==
Mundella died unexpectedly. On 14 July 1897 his butler found him "prostrated and unconscious" on his bedroom floor. He had suffered a stroke and remained paralysed with a complete loss of speech, and he was barely conscious for eight days. Many people, including Queen Victoria (who telegraphed a number of times for news) and leading politicians of all shades of opinion, expressed concern. At 1.55 pm on 21 July 1897 he died, at the age of 72.

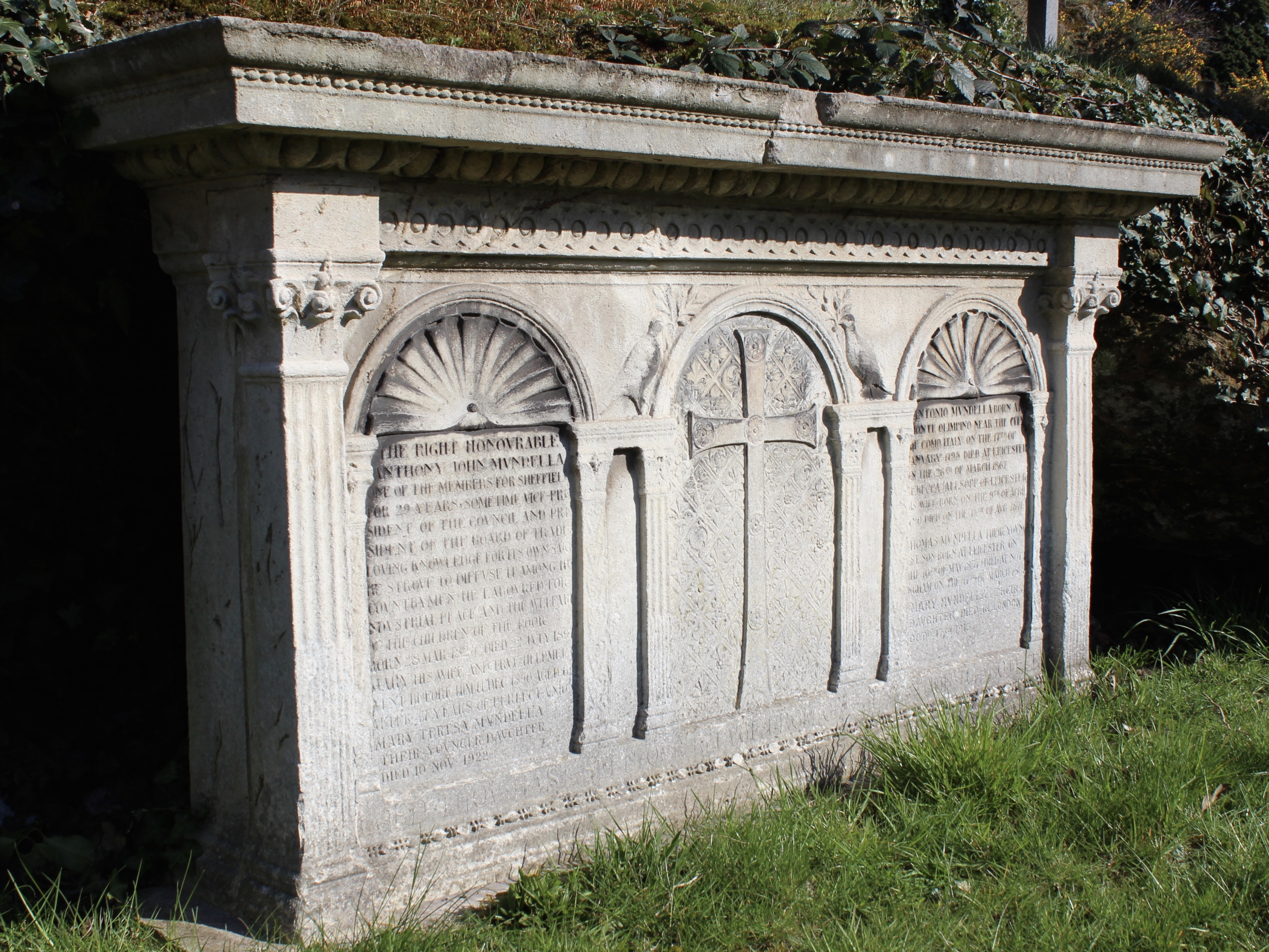
Mundella's burial place: The Mundella vault, Church Cemetery, Nottingham

Three funeral services were held. The first was at St Margaret's, Westminster on 26 July. It was unusual for St Margaret's in that Mundella's coffin was present, rather than the service being a memorial. The coffin was draped in a pall of Venetian brocade, with a marble statuette of the Madonna and Child and a photograph of Mundella's late wife placed at its head. Queen Victoria sent a wreath, and she and the Prince of Wales were represented amongst a very large number of male and female mourners. The church was full and later congregants were forced to assemble outside. It was noted that an unusually large number of working men had come to pay their respects to Mundella.

Mundella's coffin was then taken through the centre of London to St Pancras station for transfer by train to Nottingham. A second funeral service was held in Nottingham at St Mary's Church on 27 July. It was the largest funeral the city had ever seen. Crowds then lined the route from St Mary's to the Church Cemetery, where further mourners crowded onto the hillside overlooking the grave. A third service was conducted at the graveside. He was buried in the Mundella vault where his parents, his wife and his youngest brother had been previously interred.

A wide stone in a combination of classical styles and Arts and Crafts decoration was erected over the tomb. To Mundella's name was added the inscription: "Loving knowledge for its own sake, he strove to diffuse it among his countrymen. He laboured for industrial peace, and the welfare of the children of the poor."

== Legacy and reputation ==
Mundella was highly respected during his long period in Victorian Liberal politics, achieving elevation to the cabinet and attaining the distinction of becoming known as a statesman. It has been argued that his was "the most productive mind in late Victorian England at work in the kindred fields of education, industry and labour" and as a result his political achievements in those fields were remarkable.

By such work Mundella prepared the late Victorian age for the dawning of the 20th century. Many of the improvements he fostered have been altered somewhat in the years since his death, but the long-term effects of everything he enabled have remained: children must still go to school, trade unions are still legal, freshwater fish are still allowed a peaceful breeding season.

Despite Mundella's beneficial influence on education, industry, and the protection of children, after his death in 1897 his name and reputation disappeared from public view and he became mostly a forgotten man of Gladstone's administrations.

It has been suggested that one reason was the absence of an early biography. It was the intention of Mundella's daughter Maria Theresa to write his biography (which would presumably have been celebratory), but despite working for some years on his archive, collecting contributions and loans from others, and making lengthy transcriptions, nothing was published. She died in 1922. Her collected Mundella papers then passed to his granddaughter, Dorothea Benson, Lady Charnwood, who presented them to the University of Sheffield Library in the 1930s.

A biography finally appeared. Harry Armytage's A.J.Mundella 1825–1897 – The Liberal Background to the Labour Movement was published in 1951. He made good use of Ms Mundella's copious research in his book, and before its publication in academic papers and a radio broadcast. Mundella is regularly mentioned in volumes recording the Victorian hosiery business, the history of education, and early labour relations. Academic theses have examined his political reputation. The Oxford Dictionary of National Biography completely rewrote his entry in 2004.

But such occasional kick-starting has failed to fire the engine of modern-day regard for Mundella’s reputation. He is absent from the Encyclopaedia Britannica, and Wikipedia’s original article about him was brief and incomplete. There is no public monument to him. Mundella Grammar School in Nottingham no longer exists. A request in the mid-1980s for the installation of a commemorative blue plaque at Mundella's London home of 16 Elvaston Place was refused by English Heritage.

== Personal life ==
On 12 March 1844, when aged eighteen, Mundella married Mary, the daughter of William Smith, a warehouseman of Kibworth Beauchamp in Leicestershire. (Note: Mary Mundella née Smith was described as "a woman of lofty mind and great determination" and shared her husband's literary and artistic sympathies. Her "quiet, clever criticisms" were said to delight her guests and she was credited with an "unselfish, gentle, and sunny disposition" She died after a short illness on 14 December 1890. Their marriage was described as "outstandingly happy" and "blissful" and Mundella was said to have been "inconsolable" at his wife's death. "She was loved and honoured in an extraordinary degree by all from the highest to the humblest," Mundella wrote to his sister Theresa. "What a romance it all seems, Alas! What a terrible drama for me!" His manner after his bereavement was said to have become sharper and more intolerant, as observed by another MP in the House of Commons.) They had two daughters, Eliza Ellen and Maria Theresa.

When Mundella was a manufacturer he commissioned a large new villa, designed by the architect Thomas Chambers Hine, in The Park Estate in Nottingham, and after moving to London when he became an MP the family lived, firstly, in Dean's Yard in Westminster, then rented a house in Stanhope Gardens in Kensington before, at the end of 1872, purchasing 16 Elvaston Place nearby. While he had made money in business, Mundella had never been particularly rich. The crash of the New Zealand company which had been the cause of his resignation left him in financial difficulties, but on the recommendation of Lord Rosebery he was awarded an annual Civil List pension of £1,200 (equivalent to £134,853 in 2025) which enabled him to continue to live in Elvaston Place.

Mundella had a striking presence, being tall and thin and bent at the shoulders with a dark complexion, a prominent hooked nose and a flowing beard. Easily recognisable, he was reported to be a familiar figure in London. In character he was described as warm, impulsive, enthusiastic, and optimistic, and ready to believe the best in anyone.

It has been observed that "Mundella made enemies at every stage. He was far too confident and masterful for a quiet life, and in an age of overflowing political activity his mind and methods appeared to stand for the whole menace of radical change." As he grew older the cabinet held him in high esteem but younger politicians were "never quite sure whether he was a rogue or a fool, but they were convinced that he was a bore" because of his determined enthusiasm on a few dominant themes.

At home, Mundella had a regard for domestic comforts and liked to be surrounded by beautiful objects. One of his nieces recalled that he and his family flourished at a time when all things Italian were fashionable and having Italian ancestry was considered most desirable. 16 Elvaston Place, she recalled, was full of beautiful Italian things. The house was often crowded with friends, not only politicians, but also many from the world of the arts and literature, business, and journalism.

Mundella was a Fellow of the Royal Society, an honour awarded in 1882 that he described as "the most agreeable and distinguished that could fall upon me", In 1884 he became President of the Sunday School Union, a position he deeply valued. His elevation in political life brought him from his labouring class roots into the sphere of the rich, the aristocratic, and the royal. After her initial suspicion, Queen Victoria learned to care deeply for him and invited him for weekends at Windsor, Osborne, and Sandringham. She was distressed by his death.

Though Mundella was not Jewish (his mother being a Protestant and his father a Catholic), throughout his political life his looks, his foreign-sounding name, and his artistic individualism in dress encouraged opponents and hostile cartoonists and journalists to indulge in anti-semitic insults.

Despite Mundella's claim when applying for his Civil List pension in 1894 that he had "insufficient private means", at his death, three years later, his estate was valued at £42,619 1s 3d (equivalent to £4,789,412 in 2025).

== Mundella likenesses ==
- Portrait in oil: by Sir Arthur Stockdale Cope RA (1857–1940). Painted on commission for the citizens of Sheffield to celebrate Mundella's 25th anniversary as an MP. A three-quarter length portrayal of Mundella as president of the Board of Trade with his hand resting on a departmental despatch box. The Sheffield Telegraph commented: "His face wears a somewhat sad and serious expression, and the artist has given him the full measure of his years". The artist was Mundella's own choice. The painting was exhibited at the Royal Academy of Arts in London in the spring of 1894 and presented to Mundella on 11 Dec 1894 before being given to Sheffield Town Council. It is on loan to Sheffield Galleries and Museums Trust.
- A replica of the portrait, also painted by Cope, was presented to Mundella's daughter Maria Theresa on the same occasion. Its location is unknown.
- Portrait in oil: by Arthur John Black (1855–1936). This portrait was presented to Mundella's daughter, Maria Theresa, who in 1898 donated it to the Nottingham School Board for display in the new Mundella Grammar School. The school closed in 1985 and the portrait was passed to its successor schools, Roland Green Comprehensive and The Nottingham Emmanuel School. It was then taken into the care of a group of former students of the Mundella Grammar School, who in 2009 had it cleaned and loaned it to the Bromley House Library, Nottingham, where it is now displayed.
- Bust, marble: by Sir Joseph Edgar Boehm RA (1834–1890). Working women and children, who had enjoyed the benefit of the Factory Act 1874 subscribed, mostly in single pennies, to a tribute to Mundella and his wife. It took the form of the bust by Boehm and bears the inscription: "Presented to Mrs. Mundella by 80,000 factory workers, chiefly women and children, in grateful acknowledgement of her husband's services". It was presented to Mary Mundella at a ceremony in Manchester in August 1884, ten years after the Factory Act had passed. The bust remained in the family until some time after 1938 when it was presented to the Nottingham School Board for display in the Mundella Grammar School. When this school closed in 1985 the bust passed to Roland Green School and then The Nottingham Emmanuel School. It was then taken into the care of a group of former students of Nottingham Grammar School, who in 2009 had it cleaned and loaned it to the Bromley House Library, Nottingham where it is now displayed.
- Caricature, chromolithograph: by Coïdé, the pseudonym of James Tissot (1836–1902). It was first published in Vanity Fair on 9 December 1871 as Number 99 in their series of "Portraits of Statesmen". It is entitled "Education and Arbitration". Reproductions were available for sale and there are consequently many copies in private hands and in public collections, including those of the UK Houses of Parliament, the National Portrait Gallery, London, and the University of Sheffield Library.
- Caricature, chromolithograph: by Spy, the pseudonym of Leslie Ward (1851–1922). It was first published in Vanity Fair on 30 November 1893. It is entitled "On the Terrace, A Political Spectacle: – The Ayes have it – the Noes have it" and it is a group cartoon portrait with Mundella in the right foreground. A copy of it is owned by the National Portrait Gallery in London.
- Newspaper cartoons: by various artists. 16 images, all including lampooning representations of Mundella, and all relating to the parliamentary elections in Sheffield in 1868. They are held by Sheffield University Library.
- Photograph, platinum print: by Sir John Benjamin Stone (1838–1914). A late portrait photograph of Mundella, seen standing at an entrance to the Houses of Parliament and dated May 1897 (two months before his death). A copy is held by the National Portrait Gallery and another, with greater clarity of detail, by the UK Parliament's digital archive.
- Photograph, woodburytype carte de visite: by an unknown photographer. A head and shoulders portrait, taken in the 1870s. A copy is in the National Portrait Gallery.
- Photograph, albumen print cabinet card: by Alexander Bassano (1829–1913) A right semi-profile head-and-shoulders portrait, made in 1885. The National Portrait Gallery owns a copy.
- Photograph, albumen print: by Cyril Flower, 1st Baron Battersea (1843–1907). A three-quarter-length seated portrait, taken in the 1890s. A copy is held by the National Portrait Gallery.
- As a leading statesman with prominent looks, Mundella can also be identified in many group portraits, photographs, and newspaper and journal illustrations of the late 1800s. Two particular images can be found in The Illustrated London News: the first, marking Mundella's maiden speech in the House of Commons, was published on 27 February 1869, and the second, a group portrait by Walter Wilson of WE Gladstone's new Cabinet, was published on 27 August 1892.

== Notes ==
Parliament of the United Kingdom
Preceded by John Arthur Roebuck; George Hadfield	Member of Parliament for Sheffield; 1868–1885; With: George Hadfield, to 1874; John Arthur Roebuck, 1874–1879; Samuel Danks Waddy, 1879–1880; Charles Stuart-Wortley, 1880–1885	Constituency abolished
New constituency	Member of Parliament for Sheffield Brightside; 1885–1897	Succeeded by Frederick Maddison
Political offices
Preceded by Lord George Hamilton	Vice-President of the Committee on Education; 1880–1885	Succeeded by Hon. Edward Stanhope
Preceded by Hon. Edward Stanhope	President of the Board of Trade; 1886	Succeeded by Hon. Frederick Stanley
Preceded by Sir Michael Hicks Beach, Bt	President of the Board of Trade; 1892–1894	Succeeded by James Bryce
