= George Hadfield (politician) =

George Hadfield (28 December 1787 – 21 April 1879) was an English lawyer, author and Radical politician who represented Sheffield for 22 years.

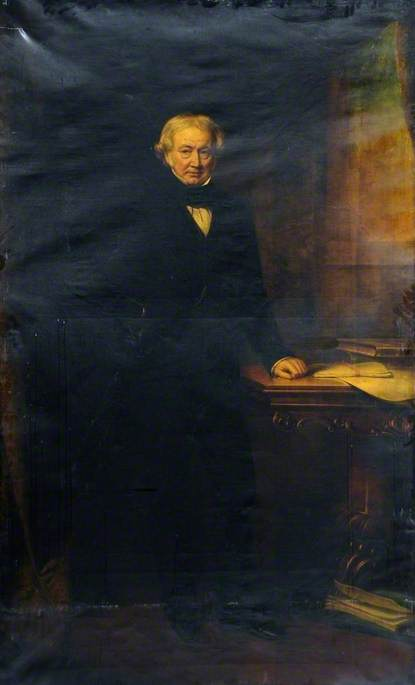
George Hadfield, portrait by James Godsell Middleton

== Biography ==
Hadfield was born at Sheffield, the son of Robert Hadfield, a successful merchant, and his wife Anne Bennett. He was articled to John Sherwood of Sheffield and was admitted as an attorney in January 1810. He practised in Manchester for over forty years, and was in partnership first with James Knight, then with James Grove, and finally with his son George. He spent many years in litigation and controversy in connection with the alienation of Lady Hewley's and other charities. The dispute was finally resolved by the passing of the Dissenters' Chapels Act 1844 which he had played a part in framing. With Thomas Raffles and William Roby he established the Lancashire Independent College, first at Blackburn and then at Whalley Range, where in 1840 he laid the foundation-stone of the new building and gave £2,000 towards the cost of the erection.

Hadfield contested Bradford as a Liberal on 12 January 1835, but was defeated by John Hardy. He took a prominent part in the formation of the Anti-Corn Law League. He was elected as Member of Parliament for Sheffield on 7 July 1852 and continued to represent it until 29 January 1874. In parliament, he acted with the advanced liberal party. He spoke frequently in the House of Commons, and his advice on matters relating to legal reform was much appreciated. He introduced the act relating to the registration of judgments, gave great help in passing the Common Law Procedure Act 1854, and was the author of the Qualification for Offices Abolition Act 1866.

Hadfield was a prominent member of the Congregational church. In 1864 he offered £1,000 a year for five years provided fifty independent chapels were built during that time. He repeated the offer later with equal success.

Hadfield died at his residence, Victoria Park, Manchester at the age of 92.

He married Lydia Pope, daughter of Samuel Pope of Cheapside, London in 1814. Lydia Hadfield predeceased her husband, dying in 1868, aged 80.

== Publications ==
Hadfield was the editor of several works:

1. The Report of H. M. Commissioners on Charities. With Notes and an Appendix by G. Hadfield 1829.
2. The Attorney-General versus Shore. An Historical Defence of the Trustees of Lady Hewley's Foundations. By the Rev. Joseph Hunter 1834; this refers to Hadfield's notes on the report.
3. The Debate on Church Reform republished by Hadfield, 1867.
4. The Expediency of Relieving the Bishops from Attendance in Parliament 1870.

Parliament of the United Kingdom
Preceded by John Parker; John Arthur Roebuck	Member of Parliament for Sheffield; 1852–1874; With: John Arthur Roebuck to 1868; A. J. Mundella from 1868	Succeeded by John Arthur Roebuck; A. J. Mundella
