= James Silk Buckingham =

British parliamentarian, reformer, author and journalist (1786–1855)

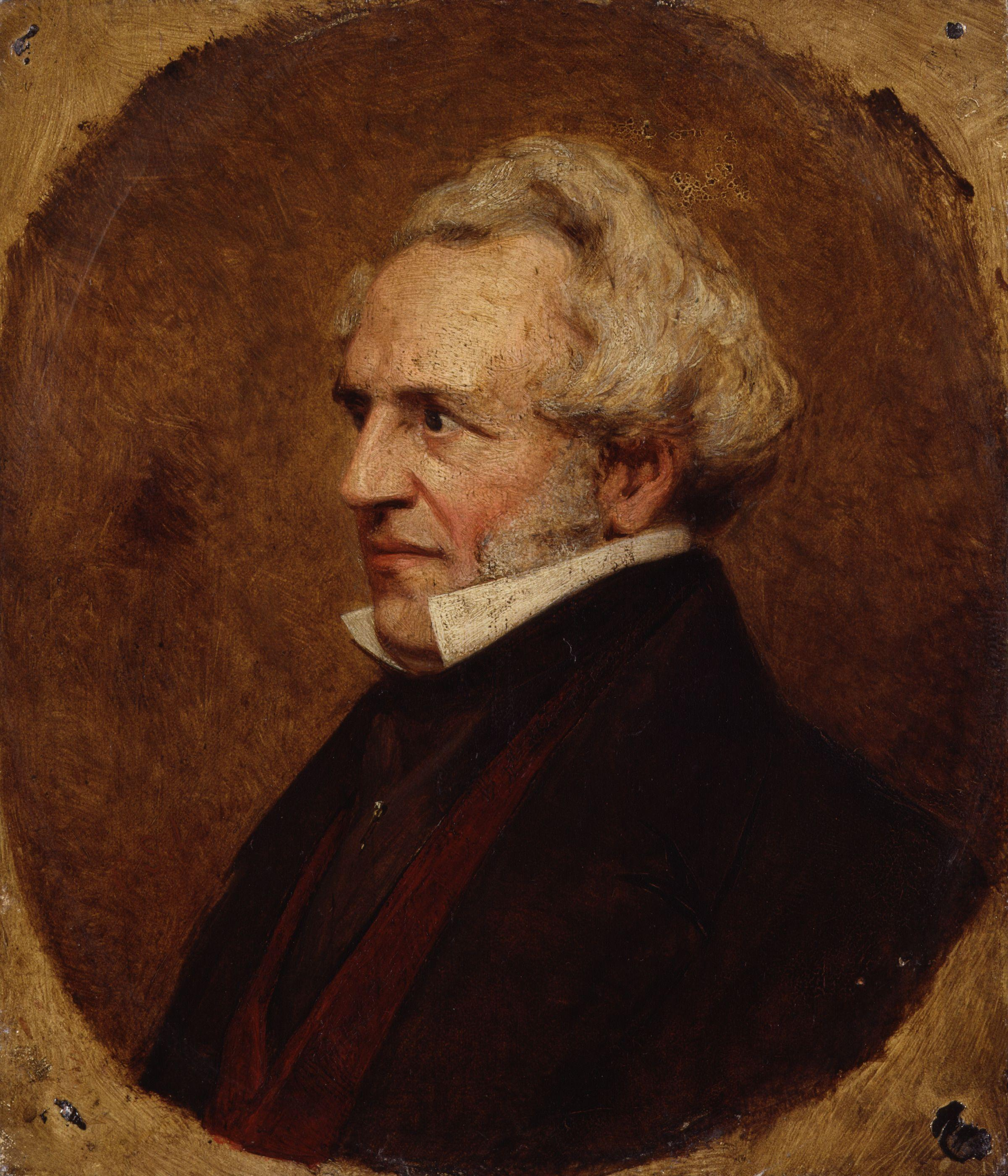
- James Silk Buckingham by Clara S. Lane
- Born: 25 August 1786; Flushing, Cornwall, England
- Died: 30 June 1855 (aged 68); London, England
- Occupations: Author, journalist, traveller

James Silk Buckingham (25 August 1786 – 30 June 1855) was a British mariner, parliamentarian, author, journalist and traveller. His achievements were varied and many. He contributed to Indian journalism and was a pioneer among the Europeans who fought for a liberal press in India. He was reforming parliamentarian in Britain and a prolific journalist and author.

== Early life ==
Buckingham was born at Flushing near Falmouth on 25 August 1786, the son of Thomasine Hambly of Bodmin and Christopher Buckingham (died 1793/94) of Barnstaple. His father, and his ancestors, were seafaring men. James was the youngest of three boys and four girls. The property of his deceased parents consisted of houses, land, mines and shares, which was left to the three youngest children. Buckingham was educated in a school in Plymouth and then at a naval academy where he learned navigation.

At the age of just nine he was allowed to ship as cabin boy on the packet Lady Harriet on which his brother-in-law was the sailing-master. The vessel completed two voyages to Lisbon, but on the third in 1797 the ship was captured by a French corvette and he and the rest of the crew were held as prisoners of war at Corunna.

On his return to Britain he worked in a nautical instrument shop and in his spare time read widely. At the age of 15 he joined the Royal Navy. He was appalled by the harsh discipline he witnessed in the service, especially the flogging, and he deserted and returned home.

== Career ==
In 1821, his Travels in Palestine was published, followed by Travels Among the Arab Tribes in 1825. After years of wandering he settled in India, where he established a periodical, the Calcutta Journal, in 1818. This venture at first proved highly successful, but in 1823 the paper's outspoken criticisms of the East India Company led to the expulsion of Buckingham from India and to the suppression of the paper by John Adam, the acting governor-general in 1823. His case was brought before a select committee of the House of Commons in 1834, and a pension of £500 a year was subsequently awarded to him by the East India Company as compensation.

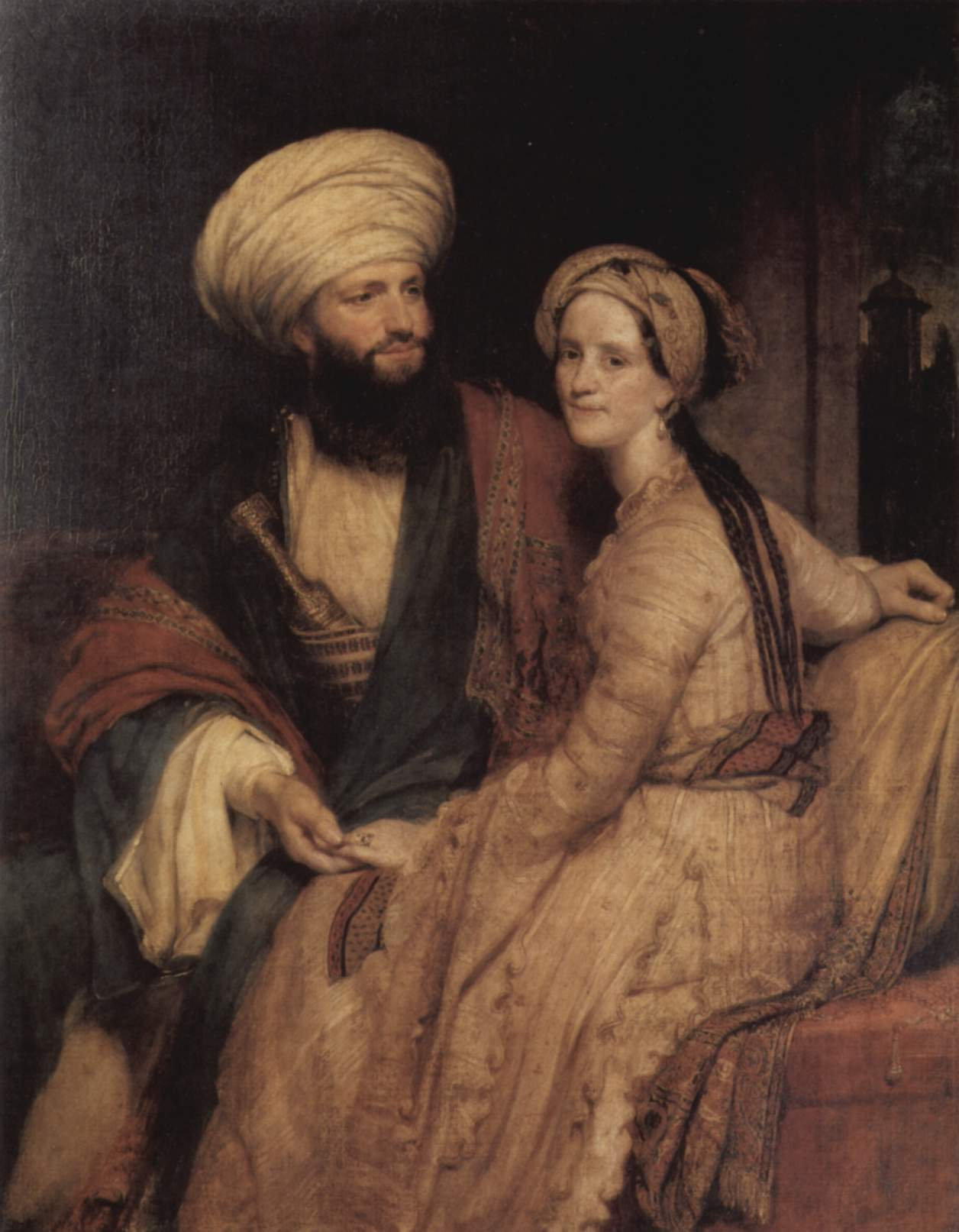
James Silk Buckingham, by Henry William Pickersgill c. 1816

Buckingham continued his journalistic ventures on his return to England; he settled at Cornwall Terrace, Regent's Park, and started the Oriental Herald and Colonial Review (1824–9) and the Athenaeum (1828) which was not a success in his hands, Buckingham selling to John Sterling after a few weeks.

Between 1832 and 1836 Buckingham served as MP for Sheffield. He was a strong advocate of social reform, calling for the end of flogging in the armed services, abolition of the press-gang and the repeal of the Corn Laws. In 1833 he promoted the law that would abolish slavery across the British empire.

During his time as an MP, Buckingham served as chair of the select committee charged with examining "the extent, causes, and consequences of the prevailing vice of intoxication among the labouring classes of the United Kingdom" devise a solution. Campaigner for the working class Francis Place concluded that the lack of "parish libraries and direct reading rooms, and popular lectures that were both entertaining and instructive" were drawing individuals to frequent "public houses for other social enjoyment". With this in mind, Buckingham introduced the Public Institutions bill in 1835. Buckingham's bill allowed boroughs to charge a tax to set up libraries and museums. This bill never became law but would serve as inspiration for William Ewart and Joseph Brotherton, who introduced a bill that would "[empower] boroughs with a population of 10,000 or more to raise a ½d for the establishment of museums". Ewart and Brotherton's bill would become the basis for the Museums Act 1845.

Following his retirement from parliament, in October 1837, Buckingham began a four-year tour of North America, resulting in another travel novel, A Journey Through the Slave States of North America in which, among other matters, he advocates that the United States follow the British example and abolish slavery. In 1844 he was central to the foundation of the British and Foreign Institute in Hanover Square.

He was a prolific writer. He had travelled in Europe, America and the East, and wrote many useful travel books, as well as many pamphlets on political and social subjects. "In 1851, the value of these and of his other literary works was recognized by the grant of a Civil List pension of £200 a year. At the time of his death in London, Buckingham was at work on his autobiography, two volumes of the intended four being completed and published (1855)". This work is important as it mentions in detail the life of the black composer Joseph Antonio Emidy who settled in Truro.

== Personal life ==
In February 1806, Buckingham married Elizabeth Jennings (1786–1865), the daughter of a Cornish farmer.

Buckingham died after a long illness at Stanhope Lodge, Upper Avenue Road, St John's Wood, London, on 30 June 1855. Buckingham is buried in Kensal Green Cemetery.

His youngest son, Leicester Silk Buckingham, was a popular playwright.

== Works ==
- Contribution For the Commemoration of the Fourth of July, 1838. Contribution For the Commemoration of the Fourth of July 1838. Written on a couch of sickness. By J S Buckingham, of England, Albany, N.Y., 3 July 1838.
- America, historical, statistic, and descriptive. Jackson, Fisher, Son, London, 1841.
- The Slaves States of North America, VI. Fisher, Son, and Co. London, 1842.
- The Slaves States of North America, VII. Fisher, Son, and Co. London, 1842.
- National Evils and Practical Remedies. With the Plan of a Model Town. Jackson, Fisher, Son, London, 1849.
- (1821): Travels in Palestine Through the Countries of Bashan and Gilead, East of the River Jordan, Including a Visit to the Cities of Geraza and Gamala in the Decapolis (volume I, volume II).
- (1825): Travels among the Arab Tribes Inhabiting the Countries East of Syria and Palestine. The full text, google-books.
- (1827): Travels in Mesopotamia Including a Journey from Aleppo to Bagdad By the Route of Beer, Orfah, Diarbekr, Mardin, and Mosul; With Researches on the Ruins of Nineveh, Babylon, and Other Ancient Cities.

Parliament of the United Kingdom
| New constituency | Member of Parliament for Sheffield; 1832 – 1837; With: John Parker | Succeeded by John Parker; Henry George Ward |
