= Captain Disney-Roebuck =

British Army officer

Francis Algernon Disney-Roebuck (1818 or 1819 – 22 March 1885), commonly referred to as Captain Disney-Roebuck or Captain Roebuck, was a British Army officer in Cape Town, Cape Colony, who became manager of a theatre company of historic importance in South Africa.

== History ==
Roebuck was born in Teignmouth, Devonshire, England, a son of Henry Disney-Roebuck and his wife Anna Maria Hussey Roebuck, née Delaval. He joined the British army in 1837 and was promoted to Captain in the 23rd Royal Welsh Fusiliers, performing garrison duty at Port Elizabeth, Cape Colony, (now Gqeberha, South Africa). While there he was the prominent organiser of amateur theatricals, later at Aldershot camp, from where he resigned in 1857.

He formed an amateur theatre company which toured England, then in 1873 founded a professional company formally titled United Service Dramatic Company but better known as "Captain Disney Roebuck's Dramatic Company" or "Captain Roebuck's Company". Frank Emery was brought into the company as comedian and General Manager, and introduced a degree of professionalism into the organization. Among actors he recruited were Lottie Venne, George Giddens and E. W. Royce.

On 25 October 1873 a cast which included Fanny Enson, Bessie Cranston, Bessie Palmer, Maud Clifford, and Messrs W. R. Clifton, E. V. Sinclair, E. Palmer, W. H. Brougham, and scene artist A. B. Saxton left England by the mail steamer European for a tour of the Cape, followed by Australia and New Zealand, but got no further than Cape Town, where they remained, though plans for a dedicated playhouse never materialised and opted for a lease on the Theatre Royal.

In 1875 the company, which now included Fanny Enson, E. Palmer, John Brougham, Bessie Cranston and Seymour Dallas, made two tours to South Africa, the first to Port Elizabeth, Grahamstown and King William's Town, the other to the Kimberley.

In 1876 the company which went to Durban, performing Hamlet, also included Maggie Duggan, William Elton, W. Foulis, Henry Harper and Mrs Harper, James Leffler, Georgina Robertson, Hilda Temple, and Sutton Vane, with scenic artist W. Thorne.

Their last production in Cape Town opened on 7 August 1882.

Major productions included Caste (1874) The Octoroon (1876), Hamlet (1876), Pygmalion and Galatea (1876), Othello (1877), and Our Boys (1877)

He died at Sea Point, Cape Town on 22 March 1885 a few hours after appearing on stage as "Macari" in Called Back, and was buried at Wynberg, Cape Town.

== Family ==
Roebuck married Anne Helen Lucy O'Halloran (19 May 1822 – 26 March 1898) on 9 November 1841 in Carlisle, Cumberland. Anne was the elder daughter of Thomas Shuldham O'Halloran (25 October 1797 – 16 August 1870), first Police Commissioner of South Australia, by his first wife. Their children include

- Alice Mary Disney-Roebuck (1843 – 5 May 1869) married Cmdr the Hon. John Brabazon Vivian, RN (20 October 1836 – 21 February 1874), son of Charles Vivian, 2nd Baron Vivian by his first wife.
- Francis Henry Algernon Disney-Roebuck (7 October 1846 – 9 January 1919), English first-class cricketer and British Army officer, married Anna Marian Kate Bond in 1869. Their children include:
  - Claude Delaval Disney-Roebuck (1 March 1876 – 10 May 1947), English first-class cricketer, British Army officer, and actor.

He was a brother of Henry Disney-Roebuck, Elizabeth Louisa Disney-Roebuck, and Susan Hussey Disney-Roebuck
