= Leicester Silk Buckingham =

English dramatist

Leicester Silk Buckingham (29 June 1825 – 15 July 1867) was an English dramatist, who achieved considerable popularity as a playwright, several of his free adaptations of French comedies being produced in London between 1860 and 1867.

== Early life ==
Buckingham, the youngest son of James Silk Buckingham, the oriental traveller, and Elizabeth Jennings, was born at 11 Cornwall Terrace, Regent's Park, London, 29 June 1825. In his early life he was the companion of his father in visits made to America, France, and the East, and the experience thus acquired rendered his services valuable as a lecturer on several occasions.

When the Royal Panopticon (afterwards the Alhambra in Leicester Square) was originated in 1854 as a scientific institution, Buckingham was selected to write and deliver the explanatory description of the views of various countries, and later at the Egyptian Hall he was the lecturer engaged to illustrate Hamilton's Tour of Europe.

Connecting himself in early life with the stage he produced several light pieces at the Strand Theatre when that establishment was under Mr. J. Payne's direction in 1856–7, and for a short time undertook the responsibilities of management. Among the most successful comedies he afterwards wrote may be mentioned The Merry Widow, 1863; Silken Fetters, 1863; The Silver Lining, 1864; and Faces in the Fire, 1865.

== Dramatist and writer ==
As a dramatist he borrowed from the French stage, and the majority of his pieces were founded on the works of Parisian writers. He was from 1857 to 1867 dramatic and musical critic of the Morning Star.

Buckingham commenced writing at the early age of nineteen, when he compiled for R. Bentley Memoir of Mary Stuart, Queen of Scotland, 1844. This was followed by Life and Times of Louis Philippe, by the Rev. G. N. Wright. Continued to the Revolution of 1848 by L. F. A. Buckingham, 1850. Belgium, the Rhine, Italy, Greece, and the Mediterranean, by the Rev. G. N. Wright and L. F. A. Buckingham, appeared in 1851, and in 1853 he published The Bible in the Middle Age, with Remarks on the Libraries, Schools, and Religious Aspects of Mediaeval Europe. He was also the author of upwards of thirty-five burlesques, comedies, and farces.

== Personal life ==
On 5 April 1844, at the age of 18 he married at Gretna Green, under the name of L. S. F. Y. Buckingham, Caroline Sarah, fourth daughter of Captain Frederic White, of H.M.'s packet service Weymouth.

He later married Maria Louisa Rowswell (1829–1909) on 20 June 1848 at St James, Piccadilly, London.

He was also known: Leicester, Leicester Ambrose, Leicester Silk, Leicester Forbes Ambrose, Leicester Stanhope, Leicester Stanhope Forbes, Leicester Stanhope Forbes Young, and Leicester Stanhope Forbes Young Ambrose. He also made use of the pseudonym Matthews & Co. when producing his first drama, called Aggravating Sam, in 1854.

He died at Margate 15 July 1867, a convert to the Roman Catholic faith. His copyrights passed to Thomas Hailes Lacy, theatrical publisher, who in September 1873 bequeathed them to the Royal General Theatrical Fund.
