= Charles Stuart-Wortley, 1st Baron Stuart of Wortley =

British politician

The Right Honourable The Lord Stuart of Wortley PC
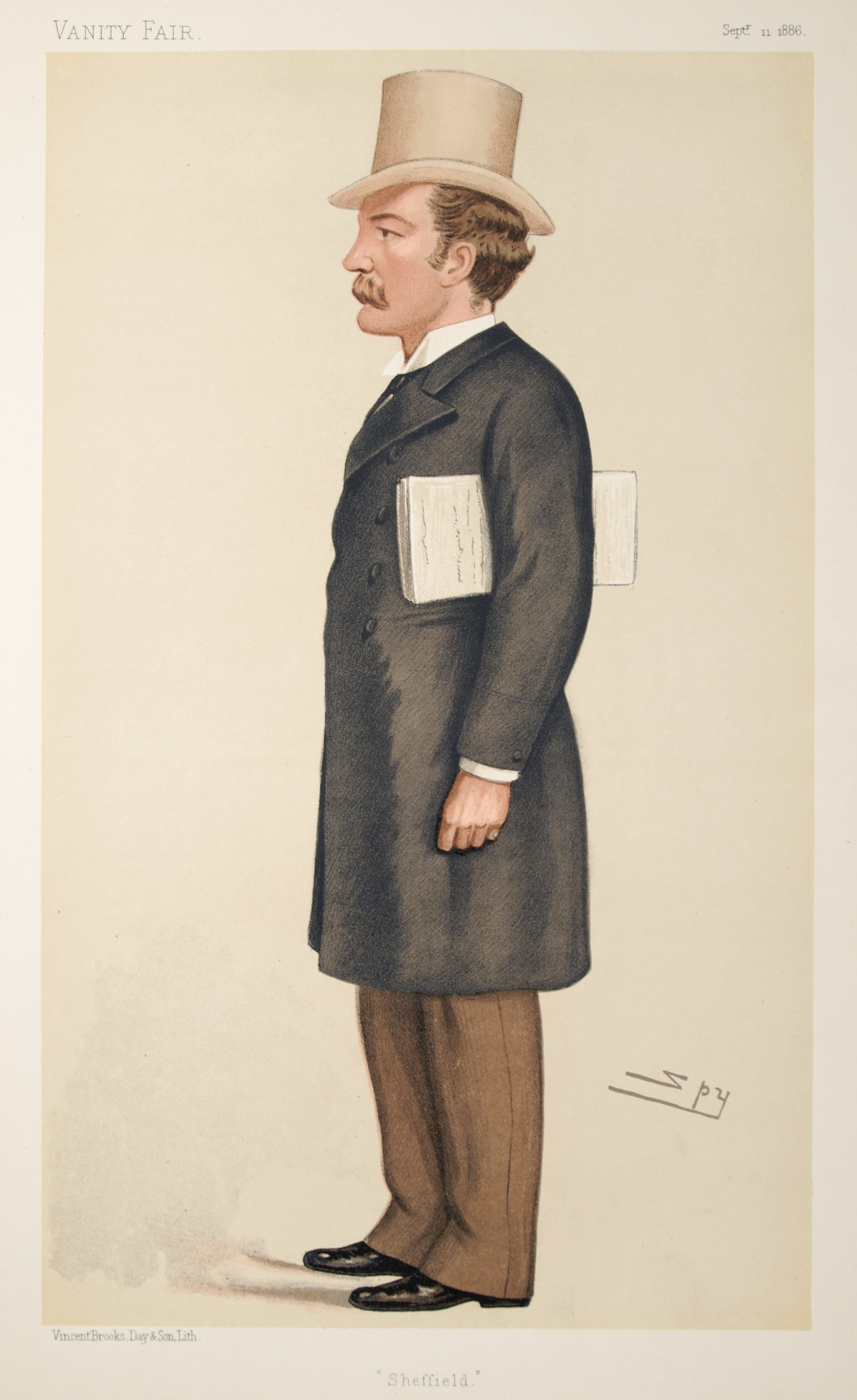
- "Sheffield". Caricature by Spy published in Vanity Fair in 1886.

Under-Secretary of State for the Home Department
- In office 30 June 1885 – 28 January 1886
- Monarch: Victoria
- Prime Minister: The Marquess of Salisbury
- Preceded by: Henry Fowler
- Succeeded by: Henry Broadhurst
- In office 4 August 1886 – 11 August 1892
- Monarch: Victoria
- Prime Minister: The Marquess of Salisbury
- Preceded by: Henry Broadhurst
- Succeeded by: Herbert Gladstone

Personal details
- Born: 15 September 1851 Escrick, East Riding of Yorkshire
- Died: 24 April 1926 (aged 74) Chelsea, London
- Party: Conservative
- Spouse(s): Beatrice Trollope (d. 1881); Alice Sophia Caroline Millais
- Education: Balliol College, Oxford

Charles Beilby Stuart-Wortley, 1st Baron Stuart of Wortley PC (15 September 1851 – 24 April 1926), was a British Conservative politician who sat in the House of Commons from 1880 until 1916, shortly before he was raised to the peerage. He served as Under-Secretary of State for the Home Department between 1885–1886 and 1886–1892 in the Conservative administrations headed by Lord Salisbury.

== Background and education ==
A member of the Stuart family headed by the Marquess of Bute, Stuart-Wortley was the son of James Stuart-Wortley, youngest son of James Stuart-Wortley, 1st Baron Wharncliffe, son of James Stuart-Wortley-Mackenzie, second son of Prime Minister John Stuart, 3rd Earl of Bute. His mother was the Hon. Jane Stuart-Wortley (born Lawley). He was educated at Rugby and Balliol College, Oxford and called to the bar at Inner Temple in 1876. He was secretary to the Royal Commission on the Sale of Benefices from 1879 to 1880.

== Political career ==
In 1880 Stuart-Wortley was the first Conservative to be elected as a Member of Parliament for Sheffield, and when this constituency was broken up under the Redistribution of Seats Act 1885, he was elected in the 1885 general election as MP for the new Sheffield Hallam constituency. He served under Lord Salisbury as Under-Secretary of State for the Home Department between 1885 and 1886 and again from 1886 to 1892. In 1896 he was admitted to the Privy Council. Stuart-Wortley resigned from the House of Commons on 16 December 1916 and in 1917 he was raised to the peerage as Baron Stuart of Wortley, of the City of Sheffield.

== Personal life ==
Lord Stuart of Wortley married Beatrice, daughter of Thomas and Theodosia Trollope (and niece of the author Anthony Trollope), in 1880. Beatrice died in July 1881 and Stuart married as his second wife Alice Sophia Caroline Millais (1862–1936), daughter of the artist John Everett Millais. Known to her family as Carrie, she and her husband shared an interest in music, playing the Grieg and Schumann concertos on two grand pianos at their home. Among her friends were the art critic Claude Phillips, the arts patron Frank Schuster, Lady Charles Beresford and the composer Edward Elgar to whom she was known as Alice and 'Windflower'.

He died in April 1926, aged 74, when the barony became extinct.

== Honours ==
In October 1920, the Great Central Railway gave the name Lord Stuart of Wortley to one of their newly built 4-6-0 express passenger locomotives, no. 1168 of class 9P (LNER class B3). It carried the name until withdrawal in September 1946.

Parliament of the United Kingdom
Preceded by Samuel Danks Waddy; A. J. Mundella	Member of Parliament for Sheffield; 1880 – 1885; With: A. J. Mundella	Constituency abolished
New constituency	Member of Parliament for Sheffield Hallam; 1885 – 1916	Succeeded by H. A. L. Fisher
Political offices
Preceded by Henry Fowler	Under-Secretary of State for the Home Department; 1885–1886	Succeeded by Henry Broadhurst
Preceded by Henry Broadhurst	Under-Secretary of State for the Home Department; 1886–1892	Succeeded by Herbert Gladstone
Party political offices
Preceded by Henry Byron Reed	Chairman of the National Union of Conservative and Constitutional Associations; 1892	Succeeded by Sir Henry Northcote
Church of England titles
Preceded by Sir Michael Hicks Beach	Third Church Estates Commissioner; 1895–1926	Succeeded by The Lord Daryngton
Peerage of the United Kingdom
New creation	Baron Stuart of Wortley; 1917–1926	Extinct
