= Samuel Danks Waddy =

English politician

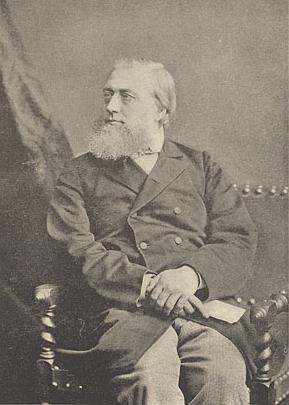
Samuel Danks Waddy.

Samuel Danks Waddy (27 June 1830 – 30 December 1902) was an English politician.

He was born in Gateshead, the son of Samuel Dousland Waddy, a Methodist minister who was elected President of the Wesleyan Methodist Conference in 1859. The family soon moved to Sheffield and his father was instrumental in the founding of Wesley College in 1838 (and was Governor of the school from 1844 to 1862). Samuel Danks Waddy attended Wesley College himself and was the first pupil to be registered in 1838. He graduated with a BA from London University in 1850, and was called to the Bar at the Inner Temple in 1858. He became a Queen's Counsel (QC) in 1874, and became a Bencher of his Inn two years later.

Waddy was elected as the Liberal Member of Parliament (MP) for Barnstaple, Devon on 3 February 1874 but resigned this seat in December 1879 to stand in a by-election in the Sheffield constituency, taking the seat on 21 December 1879. However he held the Sheffield seat for less than four months, being voted out by just 40 votes on 3 April 1880.

He was elected as MP for Edinburgh in 1882, and when that seat was abolished, he contested, but lost, the new Islington North seat at the 1885 general election.

On 7 July 1886, at the 1886 general election, he was elected as M.P. for the Brigg constituency in Lincolnshire. He held the seat until 1894 when he was appointed Recorder of Sheffield. He kept this position until he resigned shortly before his death, in late 1902.

In 1896 he was appointed as Judge of the Cheshire County Court but only held the position for two weeks, transferring to be Judge of the Sheffield County Court on 24 April 1896.

Waddy married Emma Garbutt, from Hull, who died in 1889. He died in Islington, London on 30 December 1902, aged 72.

Parliament of the United Kingdom
Preceded by Charles Henry Williams; Thomas Cave	Member of Parliament for Barnstaple; 1874 – 1879; With: Thomas Cave	Succeeded by Viscount Lymington; Thomas Cave
Preceded by John Arthur Roebuck; A. J. Mundella	Member of Parliament for Sheffield; 1879 – 1880; With: A. J. Mundella	Succeeded by Charles Stuart-Wortley; A. J. Mundella
Preceded by James Cowan; Thomas Buchanan	Member of Parliament for Edinburgh; 1882–1885; With: Thomas Buchanan	Constituency abolished
Preceded by Henry Meysey-Thompson	Member of Parliament for Brigg; 1886–1894	Succeeded by John Maunsell Richardson
