= John Parker (Whig politician) =

English politician and barrister

John Parker (21 October 1799 – 5 September 1881) was an English politician and barrister. He was born in Tickhill, West Riding of Yorkshire and educated at Repton and Brasenose College, Oxford. He was instrumental in the enfranchisement of Sheffield, petitioning Parliament in 1817 and 1822, and creating a pamphlet stating the case for Sheffield in 1830. When the Sheffield constituency was finally created as a Parliamentary borough in 1832 he was elected alongside James Silk Buckingham as its first MPs. He served as MP for Sheffield until 1852, becoming Lord of the Treasury (1839–1840), First Secretary of the Admiralty, joint Secretary to the Treasury (1846–1849), and a Member of the Privy council (1853).

He died at 71 Onslow Square, London, on 5 September 1881, and was buried at Healaugh, near Tadcaster, West Riding of Yorkshire, on 9 September, having married, on 8 February 1853, Eliza Charlotte, second daughter of George Vernon of Clontarf Castle, Dublin, Ireland.

Parliament of the United Kingdom
| New constituency | Member of Parliament for Sheffield; 1832 – 1852; With: James Silk Buckingham; Henry George Ward; John Arthur Roebuck | Succeeded by George Hadfield; John Arthur Roebuck |
Political offices
| Preceded by Richard More O'Ferrall | First Secretary of the Admiralty; 1841 | Succeeded by Sidney Herbert |
| Preceded by Edward Cardwell | Financial Secretary to the Treasury; 1846–1849 | Succeeded by William Goodenough Hayter |
| Preceded by Henry George Ward | First Secretary of the Admiralty; 1849–1852 | Succeeded by Augustus Stafford |
