= Harry Armytage =

Walter Harry Green Armytage (22 November 1915 – 13 June 1998) was a social historian and historian of education at the University of Sheffield. He was later the Gerald Read Professor of Education at Kent State University in Ohio.

== Early life ==
Walter Harry Green Armytage was born in Kimberley, South Africa, on 22 November 1915. He graduated with first class honours in the historical tripos from Cambridge University in 1937 and then completed a Certificate in Education and a master's degree.

== Career ==
Armytage's first career was as a history teacher at Dronfield Grammar School in Sheffield. After war service, he joined the University of Sheffield in 1946. He was a social historian and historian of education and wrote a history of English education as well as a social history of engineering and an account of Utopian experiments in England. He was later the Gerald Read Professor of Education at Kent State University in Ohio.

== Family ==
Armytage married Frances Horsfall in 1948 (died 1996). They had one son.

== Death ==
Armytage died on 13 June 1998. After his death, History of Education, journal of the History of Education Society, carried an article in which three colleagues recalled their memories of him.

== Selected publications ==
- A.J.Mundella 1825–1897: The Liberal Background to the Labour Movement. Benn, London, 1951.
- Civic universities: Aspects of a British tradition. Benn, London, 1955.
- Heavens below: Utopian experiments in England 1560-1960. Routledge and Kegan Paul, London, 1961. Armytage, W. H. G. (18 October 2006). 2006 edition. Routledge. ISBN 978-0-415-41290-2.
- A social history of engineering. Faber and Faber, London, 1961. (Technology today and tomorrow series)
- Four hundred years of English education. Cambridge University Press, Cambridge, 1964.
- The rise of the technocrats: a social history. Routledge and Kegan Paul, London, 1965. ISBN 978-0710045645
- French influence on English education. Routledge, 1968. ISBN 978-0415668385
- German Influence on English Education. Routledge, 1969. ISBN 9780415753289
