= Entrepreneurial leadership =

Behavioral theory by Chris Roebuck

Entrepreneurial leadership is (as per Roebuck's definition) "organizing a group of people to achieve a common goal using proactive entrepreneurial behavior by optimising risk, innovating to take advantage of opportunities, taking personal responsibility and managing change within a dynamic environment for the benefit of [an] organisation".

Such leadership aims to cultivate entrepreneurial individuals and teams that fully leverage their creative potential in creating value for an organisation. Entrepreneurial leadership does this by employing leadership practices that "develop the ability in employees to self-generate, self-reflect, and self-correct in their workplace".

Within a sub-division of a large organisation, entrepreneurial leadership can involve effectively using the skills associated with successful individual entrepreneurs and applying those within the environment of the larger organisation. This may seem especially relevant within an organisation where those skills have been lost and replaced with a "corporate" mindset that focuses on process, systems and risk minimization rather than on entrepreneurial behavior.

== Definitions and theories ==
Other definitions of entrepreneurial leadership have also emerged:

An entrepreneurial leader will identify opportunities to gain advantage through creativity, innovation and market understanding and then hold themselves responsible for delivering what customers need via the effective management of risk to optimise outcomes for both the organization and the customer.

== Attributes of an entrepreneurial leader ==
The entrepreneurial leader will work within a formalized organizational structure, but use the approaches normally expected of an entrepreneur to identify opportunities. Once an opportunity has been identified, they work towards creating a value proposition that will enable rapid testing of their key assumptions. Next to effective management of risk (rather than the minimization of risk often sought within corporate environments), they are required to operate with contextual awareness in order to create a value proposition that delivers value to the customer while taking into account the organizational requirements and strategic aims. The entrepreneurial leader must have the ability to learn fast and within environments of ambiguity and change while providing clarity and coherence for those around them.

The entrepreneurial leader takes responsibility for their actions and those actions must be more proactive than reactive. They work toward organizational outcomes through creative approaches, drawing on a varied group of people and resources to reach those goals.

== Notable examples ==
A widely cited example of an entrepreneurial leader is Steve Jobs, but there are many real life examples in the world of business and other industries, such as Whitney Wolfe, Huda Kattan, Vera Wang and Diane Hendricks.

== History ==
Research into entrepreneurship and leadership is not new, but has expanded rapidly in recent years. Much of the early interest in and use of the term ‘entrepreneurial leadership’ was outside the field of entrepreneurship or management studies more generally. This includes, for example, research into the semi-piratical entrepreneurs of the late nineteenth century, and the role of not-for-profit organizations in community entrepreneurship. Within the entrepreneurship and management literatures, the term has been more alluded to in passing than systematically defined and explored. ‘Entrepreneurial leadership’ has, accordingly, been defined as a particular entrepreneurial style, as a correlate of corporate performance in different types of firms, as a missing element in entrepreneurship curricula, as an identifiable trait, and as an important feature of contemporary society. However, there have been some salient early papers focusing specifically on entrepreneurial leadership as a prerequisite for organizational development, on the importance of the entrepreneur being a (visionary) leader, and on the parallels between leadership and entrepreneurship as fields of research and practice.

The search for the characteristics or traits of leaders has been ongoing for centuries. History's greatest philosophical writings from Plato's Republic to Plutarch's Lives have explored the question "What qualities distinguish an individual as a leader?". Underlying this search was the early recognition of the importance of leadership and the assumption that leadership is rooted in the characteristics that certain individuals possess. This idea that leadership is based on individual attributes is known as the "trait theory of leadership".

The concept of entrepreneurial leadership was introduced in 2000 by McGrath and MacMillan who suggested that in dynamic markets where there is increased uncertainty and competitive pressure a new type of leader is required. They described this as the "entrepreneurial leader". These fast-changing markets or situations give those with an "entrepreneurial" approach the ability to exploit opportunities to gain an advantage for their organization faster than others.

A number of organizations have sought to develop the concept of entrepreneurial leadership within the business world. A good example is UBS, the global bank, which in the period 2002 to 2006 proactively developed entrepreneurial leadership amongst its top 500 leaders. The success of this was demonstrated by improvements in individual, team, and financial performance, the project becoming a key element in the Harvard Business School Case study, "UBS Aligning the Integrated firm". The bank was subsequently awarded the title Best Company for Leaders (Europe) 2005. The implementation of this project over a multi-divisional bank spread globally was complex and took a number of years. This is reviewed in a case study by Chris Roebuck, Visiting Professor of Transformational Leadership at Cass Business School in London. Roebuck was one of the leaders of the team who implemented entrepreneurial leadership in UBS.

The principles of entrepreneurial leadership can be applied to a number of sectors and a wide variety of organizations. The success of this approach has confirmed the compatibility of entrepreneurial leadership with the majority of organizations seeking to improve client/customer service and overall performance.

Prof Chris Roebuck notes that in recent examples of applying entrepreneurial leadership to organizations, the link to employee engagement has increasingly become as a key success factor. This has also allowed development of the concept of entrepreneurial support functions, such as Entrepreneurial HR and Entrepreneurial IT, to support the customer or client facing parts of organisations.

Entrepreneurial Leadership is not so much a style of leadership as a focus of leadership and employees' efforts on specific actions that either maximize the effectiveness of service delivery currently or seek to improve it in the future.

== Styles of leadership ==
Leadership style refers to a leader's behavior. It is the result of the philosophy, personality, and experience of the leader. Rhetoric specialists have also developed models for understanding leadership (Robert Hariman, Political Style, Philippe-Joseph Salazar, L'Hyperpolitique. Technologies politiques De La Domination).

=== Participative or democratic style ===
The democratic leadership style favors decision-making by the group. Such a leader gives instructions after consulting the group. They can win the cooperation of their group and can motivate them effectively and positively. The decisions of the democratic leader are not unilateral as with the autocrat because they arise from consultation with the group members and participation by them.

=== Autocratic or authoritarian style ===
An autocratic leadership style is one which provides full control for one person. This leader will hold all authoritative power with all decisions and takes near to no contribution from other members of the group. Decisions are not up for discussion by the group and the leader can make these decisions based on their own thoughts. This style is mostly seen within relatively small companies with few employees and is only effective if the work culture needs to make quick decisions. However, this leadership style can be seen as outdated with a lot of businesses using the democratic style. This in turn increases motivation of employees because by having an input they can be recognised and rewarded for their suggestions and ultimately provides a boost in employee morale and thus, help the company flourish and succeed.

=== Other types and theories ===
- Business oligarch
- Charismatic authority
- Collaborative leadership
- Cross-cultural leadership
- Entrepreneurship education
- Internet entrepreneur
- Leader-Member Exchange Theory (LMX)
- Leadership development
- Operational risk
- Social entrepreneurship
- Trait Leadership
- Venture capitalist

=== Contexts ===
- Entrepreneur
- Leadership

=== Related articles ===
- Leadership accountability
- Leadership school
- Leadership studies
- Corporate title
- Corporate jargon
