= Chris Roebuck =

British economist

- Occupations: Speaker and author
- Website: chrisroebuck.live

Chris Roebuck is a British economist, focusing on leadership and organisational performance. He was honorary visiting professor of transformational leadership at Cass Business School in London between 2009 and 2021. He advises organisations on improving performance through leadership, in particular developing entrepreneurial leadership.

In 2009, 2010, 2011, 2013, 2014, 2016, 2017, 2018, 2019 and 2021 he was nominated by HR Magazine as one of HRs Most Influential Thinkers. In 2025, he was inducted into the HR Hall of Fame. In 2025, he was appointed to the International Advisory Board of the UCL School of Management. He serves as the chair of the Advisory Board for the MSc in People Analytics ad Human Centric Management beginning in 2025.

Roebuck advises the Chartered Management Institute, and the Chartered Institute of Personnel and Development, business groups such as the Corporate Leadership Council, and the media, writing for Newsweek and quoted in publications such as The Times and the Wall Street Journal, and has been interviewed on leadership and business issues by the BBC and other television channels.

== Career ==
In 1992 he received his MBA from Cass Business School in London. His dissertation on organisational communication was featured in The Times, on BBC Television and was published worldwide in the International Journal of Strategic Management.

In 1999, Roebuck was invited to be a member of a panel on improving leadership in British business in order to enhance competitiveness, reporting to the UK government.

At UBS, Roebuck and colleagues led the delivery of a new development and leadership strategy for the bank's top 500 leaders. They subsequently co-ordinated the strategy via the business divisions for the other 70,000 employees. This underpinned a new corporate alignment, culture and brand, improving the bottom line and the position of UBS in the global banking rankings through entrepreneurial leadership. In 2004, he was appointed global head of talent and leadership. The project at UBS progressed well with top management support and, as a result, in 2005 UBS won the title "Best Company for Leaders Europe" and the "Best New Corporate University" awards, the "Corporate University Best Practice" and "Excellence" awards in 2006/2007, and was ranked one of the top 10 best companies in Europe in 2007.

The UBS talent and leadership initiative now forms a key part of a Harvard Business School case study "UBS: Towards the Integrated Firm" on supporting strategic business change, realignment and improvement via talent and leadership activity. This case is also reviewed from the organisational culture and performance perspective.

Roebuck was part of the expert group developing the 2009 report on Employee Engagement "Engaging for Success" for the UK government to improve performance in British business. He also subsequently worked on its implementation. In 2011 he was commissioned by the King's Fund, the UKs leading health sector think tank, to deliver a report and recommendations on developing leadership in the NHS to enhance patient care for their commission to the UK government.

== Entrepreneurial leadership ==
Roebuck implemented the concept of entrepreneurial leadership in the corporate world in the early 2000s by taking the behaviours of successful entrepreneurs and enabling UBS leaders to replicate them and leverage market opportunities. He did this by identifying behaviours that could be transferred to UBS leaders to enhance their entrepreneurship.

Entrepreneurial leadership is defined as “organizing a group of people to achieve a common goal using proactive entrepreneurial behavior by optimizing risk, innovating to take advantage of opportunities, taking personal responsibility and managing change within a dynamic environment for the benefit of an organization."

== Publications ==
Roebuck has written books on leadership, communication and delegation. His book on "hands-on" leadership was a global bestseller, translated into 11 languages and was used as a best practice guide by the American Management Association.

He had columns in CEO and HR magazines for a number of years and has written for publications such as Health Service Journal, Governance magazine, Management Today, The Law Society Gazette, Chartered Institute of Management Accountants Magazine, and other business titles.

His work has been quoted globally, for example in the UK national press, Financial Times, The Wall Street Journal, The Washington Post, Time, Chicago Tribune, Huffington Post, Le Monde, Times of India, Vancouver Sun and more than 50 other business titles.

In May 2014, Roebuck published a combined guide to both organisational and individual leadership introducing a new model of leadership in his new book Lead to Succeed - The Only Leadership Book You Need.

== Honours ==
In December 2011, Roebuck became a Freeman of the City of London. In March 2018 he was awarded Companionship of the Chartered Management Institute in recognition of his work developing business leadership.
