= Sheffield (UK Parliament constituency) =

Parliamentary constituency in the United Kingdom, 1832–1885

- Former borough constituency for the House of Commons
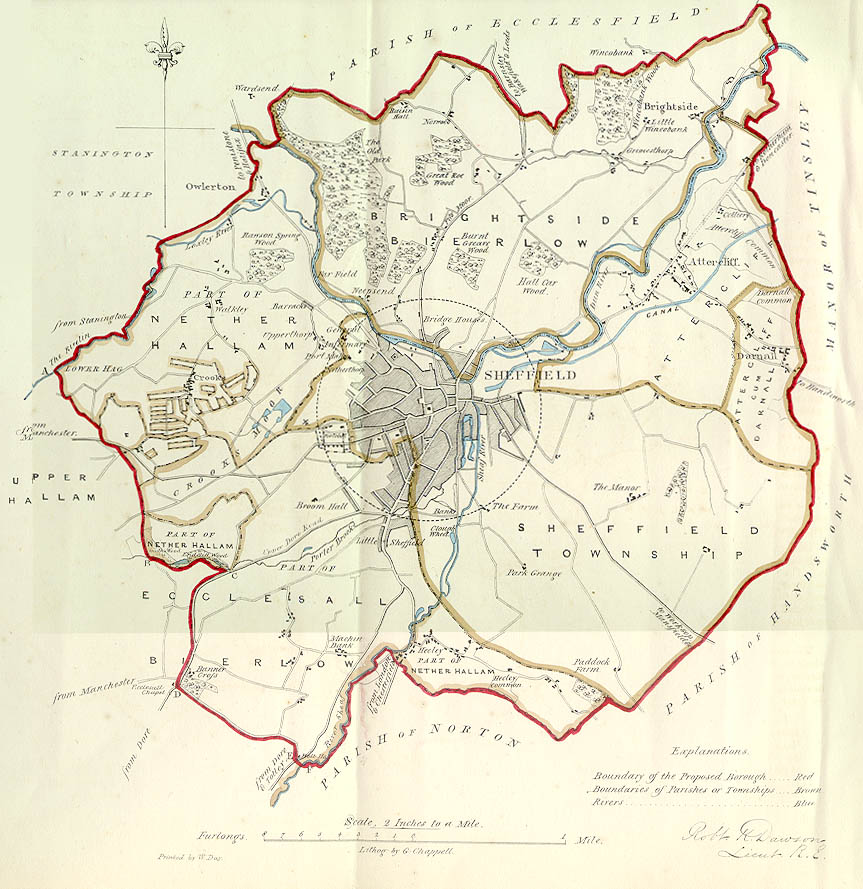
- Sheffield borough constituency in 1832
- County: West Riding of Yorkshire

1832–1885
- Seats: Two
- Created from: Yorkshire
- Replaced by: Sheffield Attercliffe, Sheffield Brightside, Sheffield Ecclesall, Sheffield Hallam, and Sheffield Central

Sheffield was a borough constituency represented in the House of Commons of the Parliament of the United Kingdom from 1832 to 1885. It elected two Members of Parliament (MPs) by the bloc vote system of elections.

The constituency encompassed the urban part of the town and parish (now city) of Sheffield, England, but not the western, rural, parts of Upper Hallam and Ecclesall Bierlow, which were incorporated into Sheffield Town Borough in 1843.

== History ==
Before 1832 Sheffield had been represented by the Yorkshire constituency. The Sheffield Borough constituency was created by the Reform Act 1832, and was given two MPs, the first time that the town had been represented in the House of Commons. Four candidates stood at the first election contesting these two seats. Voting took place on 13 and 14 December 1832, with the results declared on 15 December (see below). The election sparked a riot on 14 December, which resulted in the military being called out. The soldiers fired on the crowd, killing six people and injuring several others. Following the Redistribution of Seats Act in 1885, which sought to eliminate constituencies with more than one MP and give greater representation to urban areas, the Borough of Sheffield was sub-divided. The five new divisions—Attercliffe, Brightside, Ecclesall, Hallam, and Sheffield Central—each returned a single MP.

== Members of Parliament ==
Two MPs were elected at each general election. The table below shows the election years in which one or both of the MPs changed.

Election	Member 1	Party	Member 2	Party
1832	John Parker	Whig	James Silk Buckingham	Radical
1837	John Parker	Whig	Henry George Ward	Radical
1849 by-election	John Parker	Whig	John Arthur Roebuck	Independent Whig
1852	George Hadfield	Radical	John Arthur Roebuck	Independent Whig
1859	George Hadfield	Liberal	John Arthur Roebuck	Independent Liberal
1868	George Hadfield	Liberal	A. J. Mundella	Liberal
1874	John Arthur Roebuck	Independent Liberal	A. J. Mundella	Liberal
1879 by-election	Samuel Danks Waddy	Liberal	A. J. Mundella	Liberal
1880	Charles Stuart-Wortley	Conservative	A. J. Mundella	Liberal
1885	Constituency divided			

The constituency was sub-divided in 1885. The sitting MPs, A. J. Mundella and Charles Stuart-Wortley subsequently stood for and won seats in one of the new constituencies (Sheffield Brightside and Sheffield Hallam respectively).

== Election results ==
=== Elections in the 1880s ===
By-election, 8 May 1880: Sheffield
Party	Candidate	Votes	%	±%
Liberal	A. J. Mundella	Unopposed		
Liberal hold				

- Caused by Mundella's appointment as Vice-President of the Committee of the Council on Education.

1880 general election: Sheffield
Party	Candidate	Votes	%	±%
Liberal	A. J. Mundella	17,217	34.2	+1.0
Conservative	Charles Stuart-Wortley	16,546	32.9	N/A
Liberal	Samuel Danks Waddy	16,506	32.8	+3.3
Turnout		33,408 (est)	78.1 (est)	+15.3
Registered electors		42,794		
Majority		671	1.3	N/A
Liberal hold		Swing	N/A	
Majority		40	0.1	N/A
Conservative gain from Independent Liberal		Swing	N/A	

=== Elections in the 1870s ===
By-election, 21 Dec 1879: Sheffield
Party	Candidate	Votes	%	±%
Liberal	Samuel Danks Waddy	14,062	50.9	−12.4
Conservative	Charles Stuart-Wortley	13,584	49.1	New
Majority		478	1.8	N/A
Turnout		27,646	70.4	+17.6
Registered electors		39,270		
Liberal gain from Independent Liberal		Swing		

- Caused by Roebuck's death.

1874 general election: Sheffield
Party	Candidate	Votes	%	±%
Independent Liberal	John Arthur Roebuck	14,193	36.7	+13.8
Liberal	A. J. Mundella	12,858	33.2	+4.0
Liberal	Joseph Chamberlain	11,053	28.5	N/A
Liberal	Alfred Allott	621	1.6	N/A
Majority		3,140	8.2	N/A
Turnout		19,363 (est)	52.8 (est)	−17.1
Registered electors		36,701		
Independent Liberal gain from Liberal		Swing	+4.9	
Liberal hold		Swing	−4.9	

- Allott withdrew from the race before polling day.

=== Elections in the 1860s ===
1868 general election: Sheffield
Party	Candidate	Votes	%	±%
Liberal	George Hadfield	14,793	35.3	+4.8
Liberal	A. J. Mundella	12,212	29.2	+14.8
Independent Liberal	John Arthur Roebuck	9,571	22.9	−8.2
Conservative	Edwin Plumer Price	5,272	12.6	−11.4
Majority		2,641	6.3	N/A
Turnout		20,924 (est)	69.9 (est)	+5.9
Registered electors		29,955		
Liberal hold		Swing	+4.5	
Liberal gain from Independent Liberal		Swing	+9.5	

1865 general election: Sheffield
Party	Candidate	Votes	%	±%
Independent Liberal	John Arthur Roebuck	3,410	31.1	N/A
Liberal	George Hadfield	3,348	30.5	N/A
Conservative	James Stuart-Wortley	2,626	24.0	New
Independent	Thomas Campbell Foster	1,576	14.4	N/A
Turnout		5,480 (est)	64.0 (est)	N/A
Registered electors		8,557		
Majority		62	0.6	N/A
Independent Liberal hold		Swing	N/A	
Majority		722	6.5	N/A
Liberal hold		Swing	N/A	

=== Elections in the 1850s ===
1859 general election: Sheffield
Party	Candidate	Votes	%	±%
Independent Liberal	John Arthur Roebuck	Unopposed		
Liberal	George Hadfield	Unopposed		
Registered electors		7,381		
Independent Liberal hold				
Liberal hold				

1857 general election: Sheffield
Party	Candidate	Votes	%	±%
Independent Whig	John Arthur Roebuck	3,200	39.4	+8.2
Radical	George Hadfield	2,871	35.3	+7.7
Conservative	William Overend	2,059	25.3	+7.7
Turnout		5,095 (est)	74.1 (est)	+11.1
Registered electors		6,874		
Majority		329	4.1	+0.5
Independent Whig hold		Swing	+2.2	
Majority		812	1.0	−3.0
Radical hold		Swing	+1.8	

1852 general election: Sheffield
Party	Candidate	Votes	%	±%
Independent Whig	John Arthur Roebuck	2,092	31.2	N/A
Radical	George Hadfield	1,853	27.6	−15.7
Whig	John Parker	1,580	23.6	−20.3
Conservative	William Overend	1,180	17.6	New
Turnout		3,353 (est)	63.0 (est)	+34.7
Registered electors		5,322		
Majority		239	3.6	N/A
Independent Whig gain from Whig		Swing	N/A	
Majority		273	4.0	−26.6
Radical hold		Swing	+2.3	

=== Elections in the 1840s ===
By-election, 3 May 1849: Sheffield
Party	Candidate	Votes	%	±%
Independent Whig	John Arthur Roebuck	Unopposed		
Independent Whig gain from Radical				

- Caused by Ward's resignation after being appointed Lord High Commissioners of the Ionian Islands.

1847 general election: Sheffield
Party	Candidate	Votes	%	±%
Whig	John Parker	1,125	43.9	+3.8
Radical	Henry George Ward	1,110	43.3	+4.2
Chartist	Thomas Clark	326	12.7	New
Turnout		1,444 (est)	29.3 (est)	−23.8
Registered electors		4,934		
Majority		15	0.6	−0.4
Whig hold		Swing	−0.2	
Majority		784	30.6	+2.4
Radical hold		Swing	+0.2	

1841 general election: Sheffield
Party	Candidate	Votes	%	±%
Whig	John Parker	1,849	40.1	−5.3
Radical	Henry George Ward	1,805	39.1	−1.9
Conservative	David Urquhart	503	10.9	+4.1
Conservative	William Sheppard	457	9.9	+3.1
Turnout		2,307 (est)	53.1 (est)	c. −13.9
Registered electors		4,347		
Majority		44	1.0	−3.4
Whig hold		Swing	−4.5	
Majority		1,302	28.2	+0.8
Radical hold		Swing	−2.8	

=== Elections in the 1830s ===
1837 general election: Sheffield
Party	Candidate	Votes	%	±%
Whig	John Parker	2,186	45.4	−20.8
Radical	Henry George Ward	1,976	41.0	+7.2
Conservative	John Thorneley	655	13.6	New
Turnout		2,700	67.0	−16.2
Registered electors		4,028		
Majority		210	4.4	+3.2
Whig hold		Swing	−14.0	
Majority		1,321	27.4	+24.8
Radical hold		Swing	+14.0	

By-election, 22 August 1836: Sheffield
Party	Candidate	Votes	%	±%
Whig	John Parker	414	100.0	+33.8
Radical	John Bell	0	0.0	−33.8
Majority		414	100.0	+98.8
Turnout		414	10.6	−72.6
Registered electors		3,903		
Whig hold		Swing	+33.8	

- Caused by Parker's appointment as a Lord Commissioner of the Treasury

1835 general election: Sheffield
Party	Candidate	Votes	%	±%
Whig	John Parker	1,607	35.0	+4.9
Radical	James Silk Buckingham	1,554	33.8	−19.9
Whig	Samuel Bailey	1,434	31.2	+15.1
Turnout		2,986	83.2	−9.2
Registered electors		3,587		
Majority		53	1.2	+0.9
Whig hold		Swing	+7.4	
Majority		120	2.6	−3.1
Radical hold		Swing	−20.0	

1832 general election: Sheffield
Party	Candidate	Votes	%
Whig	John Parker	1,515	30.1
Radical	James Silk Buckingham	1,498	29.7
Radical	Thomas Asline Ward	1,210	24.0
Whig	Samuel Bailey	813	16.1
Turnout		3,056	92.4
Registered electors		3,308	
Majority		17	0.4
Whig win (new seat)			
Majority		288	5.7
Radical win (new seat)			
