= Francis Disney-Roebuck =

English cricketer and British Army officer (1846–1919)

Personal information
- Full name: Francis Henry Algernon Disney-Roebuck
- Born: 7 October 1846; Trinidad
- Died: 9 January 1919 (aged 72); Kensington, Middlesex, England
- Batting: Unknown
- Relatives: Claude Disney-Roebuck (son)

Domestic team information
- Years: Team
- 1878–1882: Marylebone Cricket Club

Career statistics
Competition	First-class
Matches	4
Runs scored	33
Batting average	5.50
100s/50s	–/–
Top score	10
Catches/stumpings	1/–
- Source: Cricinfo, 7 October 2018

Francis Henry Algernon Disney-Roebuck (7 October 1846 – 9 January 1919) was an English first-class cricketer and British Army officer.

Disney-Roebuck was born at Trinidad in October 1846 to Anne Helen Lucy O'Halloran and her husband, Francis Algernon Disney-Roebuck. He was educated at the Royal Military College, where after graduating he was posted to the 83rd Foot in February 1864 as an ensign. He was promoted to the rank of lieutenant in April 1867. While serving in Ireland, he married Anna Marian Kate Bond in 1869, with the couple going onto have two sons. He was promoted to captain in April 1870, soon after he transferred to the 46th Foot in July 1870.

He made his debut in first-class cricket for the Marylebone Cricket Club (MCC) in 1878, playing two matches against Kent and Lancashire. The 46th Foot and the 32nd Foot merged in 1881, forming the Duke of Cornwall's Light Infantry. Disney-Roebuck served in this new regiment, where he was promoted to major in July 1881. He played two further first-class matches for the MCC in May 1882, against Cambridge University and Lancashire. Months later, Disney-Roebuck saw action in the Anglo-Egyptian War of July–September 1882. He was promoted to lieutenant colonel July 1891, and retired from active service in July 1900, retaining the rank of lieutenant colonel. He died at Kensington in January 1919. He married Anna Marian Kate Bond in 1869. Their younger son, Claude, would also play first-class cricket.
