= John Arthur Roebuck =

British politician (1802–1879)

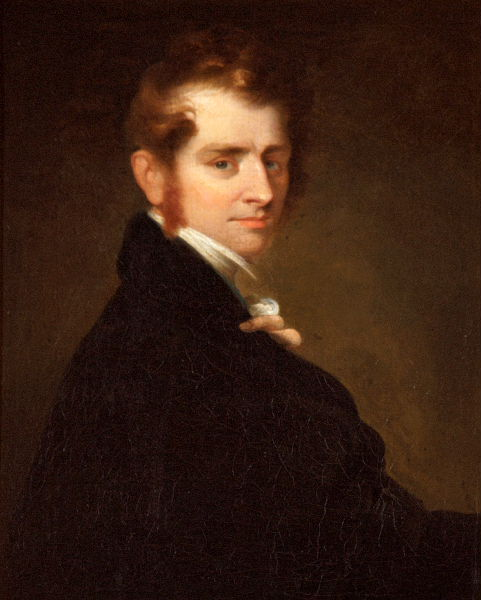
- Portrait of John Arthur Roebuck
- Born: John Arthur Roebuck; 28 December 1802; Madras, Presidency of Fort St. George, India
- Died: 30 November 1879 (aged 76); Westminster, Middlesex, England
- Political party: Radical (1832–1849); Independent Whig (1849–1859); Independent Liberal (1859–1879)
- Spouse: Henrietta Falconer (m. 1834)
- Relatives: Thomas Falconer (father-in-law); John Simpson (step-father)

John Arthur Roebuck (28 December 1802 – 30 November 1879), English politician, was born at Madras, in India. He was raised in Canada, and moved to England in 1824, and became intimate with the leading radical and utilitarian reformers. He was Member of Parliament (MP) for Bath from 1832 to 1847, and MP for the Sheffield constituency from 1849. He took up a general attitude of hostility to the government of the day, whatever it was, which he retained throughout his life. He twice came to public prominence: in 1838, when, although at the time without a seat in parliament, he appeared at the bar of the Commons to protest, in the name of the Legislative Assembly of Lower Canada, against the suspension of the constitution of Lower Canada; and in 1855, when, having overthrown Lord Aberdeen's ministry by carrying a resolution for the appointment of a committee of inquiry into the mismanagement in the Crimean War, he presided over its proceedings.

== Life ==
John Arthur Roebuck was born at Madras in 1801, was fifth son of Ebenezer Roebuck, a civil servant in India, and a grandson of the inventor John Roebuck. He was taken to England in 1807 following the death of his father. His mother remarried, to John Simpson, and the family emigrated to Lower Canada, where he was educated. His step-father was active in politics, being a member of the Legislative Assembly of Lower Canada and later of the Legislative Assembly of the Province of Canada.

Roebuck returned to England in 1824, and was entered at the Inner Temple, and called to the bar in 1831. In 1834, he married Henrietta Falconer, a daughter of Thomas Falconer. In 1835 he became the agent in England for the Legislative Assembly of Lower Canada during the dispute between the executive government and the Legislative Assembly. In 1838, although at the time without a seat in Parliament, he appeared at the bar of the Commons to protest, in the name of the Lower Canada Assembly, against the suspension of the constitution of Lower Canada. In 1843 he was appointed Queen's Counsel, and was elected a bencher of his inn.

=== Political career ===
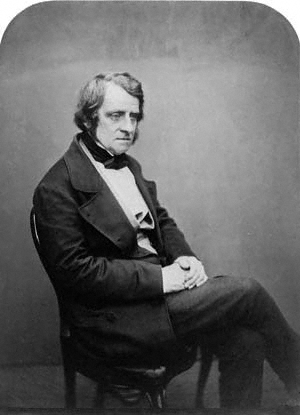
John Arthur Roebuck by Maull & Polyblank, 1856.

He was elected as a member of Parliament for Bath in 1832, declaring himself "an independent member of that house". A disciple of Jeremy Bentham and a friend of John Stuart Mill, Roebuck professed advanced political opinions, which he resolved to uphold in the House of Commons. In general, he took up an attitude of hostility to the government of the day, whatever it was, which he retained throughout his life. He attacked everyone who differed from him with such vehemence as to earn the nickname of "Tear 'em." He was never sympathetic with the Whigs, and never let an opportunity go to exhibit his contempt for them. In 1852, he wrote "The whigs, have ever been an exclusive and aristocratic faction, though at times employing democratic principles and phrases as weapons of offence against their opponents. ... When out of office they are demagogues; in power they become exclusive oligarchs".

He opposed the use of coercion in Ireland; advocated the abolition of sinecures; and proposed withdrawing the veto from the House of Lords. In 1835 he collected in a volume a series of Pamphlets for the People in support of his political views. In one of his pamphlets Roebuck denounced newspapers and everybody connected with them. As a result, John Black, the editor of The Morning Chronicle, challenged him to a duel which was fought on 19 November 1835. Neither party was injured. He failed to be re-elected for Bath in 1837, but he regained the seat in 1841.

In 1843, he proposed a motion in favour of secular education, which was rejected. In the debate on the Irish Colleges Bill, he taunted the Irish supporters of the bill with such bitterness that John Patrick Somers, MP for Sligo, threatened to challenge him to a duel. In April 1844 Roebuck defended the Home Secretary Sir James Graham from various charges, and was denounced by George Smythe, 7th Viscount Strangford, as the "Diogenes of Bath," whose actions were always contradictory. Roebuck's reply to this led to Smythe demanding a duel or a retraction.

Roebuck lost his seat in the general election of 1847. He spent some of his time in writing A Plan for Governing our English Colonies, which was published in 1849. He was returned to parliament for the Sheffield constituency in a by-election in 1849.

Roebuck championed a vigorous foreign policy. In 1850 he moved a strongly worded vote of confidence in Lord Palmerston's recent foreign policy, following the Don Pacifico affair. In 1854 he defended the Crimean War; but the inefficiency which soon became apparent in carrying it on excited his disgust. In 1855, when, having overthrown Lord Aberdeen's ministry by carrying a resolution for the appointment of a committee of inquiry into the mismanagement in the Crimean War, he presided over its proceedings. During the American Civil War he firmly championed the slave-holders of the South, boasting that Lord Palmerston had confessed to him that he was on the same side. In June 1863 Roebuck moved a resolution in the House of Commons calling for the Government to "enter into negotiations with the Great Powers of Europe, for the purpose of obtaining their co-operation in the recognition of the independence of the Confederate States of North America." During the debate on the motion Roebuck claimed to have recently received an audience with the Emperor of the French who he said had assured him that France stood ready to recognise the Confederacy if the United Kingdom would do likewise. Roebuck later dropped the motion under pressure from the Government. Roebuck also defended Austrian rule in Italy.

In his latter years his political opinions became greatly modified. A speech at Salisbury in 1862, in which he alleged that working men were spendthrifts and wife-beaters, made him unpopular for a time. He strongly denounced the trade unionist Sheffield Outrages of 1867. These uncompromising attitudes led to Roebuck's rejection by Sheffield voters at the election of 1868. He regained the seat in 1874. In 1878 he was made a privy councillor by the Tory government. He died at Westminster, in 1879. He was survived by his wife and a daughter.

== Works ==
- Remarks on the Proposed Union of the Canadas, 1822
- Debate in the House of Commons, on 15 April 1834, on Mr. Roebuck's Motion for "a Select Committee to inquire the means of remedying the evils which exist in the form of the governments now existing in Upper and Lower Canada", 1834
- The Canadas and Their Grievances, 1835
- Existing Difficulties in the Government of the Canadas, 1836
- The Colonies of England : A Plan for the Government of Portion of Our Colonial Possessions, 1849
- History of the Whig Ministry of 1830, to the Passing of the Reform Bill, 1852

Parliament of the United Kingdom
Preceded by John Thynne; Charles Palmer	Member of Parliament for Bath; 1832–1837; With: Charles Palmer	Succeeded by The Viscount Powerscourt; William Bruges
Preceded by The Viscount Powerscourt; William Bruges	Member of Parliament for Bath; 1841–1847; With: Viscount Duncan	Succeeded by Lord Ashley; Viscount Duncan
Preceded by Henry George Ward; John Parker	Member of Parliament for Sheffield; 1849–1868; With: John Parker to 1852; George Hadfield from 1852	Succeeded by A. J. Mundella; George Hadfield
Preceded by George Hadfield; A. J. Mundella	Member of Parliament for Sheffield; 1874–1879; With: A. J. Mundella	Succeeded by Samuel Danks Waddy; A. J. Mundella
