= Claude Disney-Roebuck =

English cricketer, British Army officer, and actor

Personal information
- Full name: Claude Delaval Disney-Roebuck
- Born: 1 March 1876; Morice Town, Devon, England
- Died: 10 May 1947 (aged 71); Hindhead, Surrey, England
- Batting: Unknown
- Relatives: Francis Disney-Roebuck (father)

Domestic team information
- Years: Team
- 1903–1906: Dorset
- 1906–1907: Marylebone Cricket Club

Career statistics
Competition	First-class
Matches	2
Runs scored	20
Batting average	6.66
100s/50s	–/–
Top score	8*
Catches/stumpings	1/–
- Source: Cricinfo, 3 October 2018

Claude Delaval Disney-Roebuck (1 March 1876 – 10 May 1947) was an English first-class cricketer, British Army officer, and actor.

== Early service and cricket ==
He was born at Morice Town in Plymouth in March 1876 to Anna Marian Kate Bond and her husband, the first-class cricketer and army officer Francis Disney-Roebuck. He served in the British Army with the Duke of Cornwall's Light Infantry, holding the rank of second lieutenant in 1894. He transferred regiments in May 1897, joining the Northamptonshire Regiment. he was promoted to lieutenant in August 1899, which was followed up four years later with promotion to the rank of captain in June 1903. He made his debut in minor counties cricket for Dorset in 1903, playing twice that year in the Minor Counties Championship. He encountered ill health in 1905 and was placed on half pay, with him retiring from the military in May 1906, retaining the rank of captain. In that same month he made his debut in first-class cricket for the Marylebone Cricket Club (MCC) against Leicestershire at Lord's, and in August he played a further six Minor Counties Championship matches for Dorset, which marked his final appearances in minor counties cricket. He played a further first-class match for the MCC in 1907, in a repeat of the previous seasons fixture. Disney-Roebuck married Margaret Wordsworth Charrington in January 1908.

== World War I and later life ==
During World War I, Disney-Roebuck came out of the retirement to serve in the Queen's Own Royal West Kent Regiment, gaining the rank of temporary Lieutenant Colonel by February 1916, having held the rank of major prior to this promotion. He relinquished his appointment in March 1918, and his command in January 1922.

He took up acting in the 1930s, starring in the movies The Woman Between in 1931, and The Night of the Party in 1934. He also had an uncredited role in the 1931 movie Other People's Sins. Personal tragedy struck during World War II, when both of his sons were killed; his eldest son, Algernon Guy Spencer, died of natural causes while serving in North Africa on 9 April 1941, while his youngest son, Michael Wyndham, died aboard HMS Diamond eighteen days later. Disney-Roebuck died at Hindhead, Surrey in May 1947. He was survived by his wife, who died in 1966, and his daughter Nancy, who died in 1979.
