= HMS Roebuck =

Fourteen ships of the Royal Navy have been named HMS Roebuck after a small deer native to the British Isles:

- English ship Roebuck (1585) was a flyboat purchased in 1585.
- English ship Roebuck (1636) was a 10-gun vessel launched in 1636 and sunk in 1641 as a result of a collision.
- English ship Roebuck (1646) was a 14-gun ship captured in 1646 and commissioned into the Royalist Navy two years later. She was captured at Kinsale in 1649 by Parliamentarian forces and sold in 1651.
- English ship Roebuck (1653) was a 34-gun ship captured in 1653, converted to a hulk in 1664 and sold in 1668.
- HMS Roebuck (1666) was a 16-gun sixth rate launched in 1666 and sold in 1683.
- HMS Roebuck (1688) was a 6-gun fireship purchased in 1688. She was renamed Old Roebuck in 1690 and was deliberately sunk as a foundation in 1696.
- HMS Roebuck (1690) was an 8-gun fireship launched in 1690, and later converted to a 26-gun fifth rate. She sailed under William Dampier to Australia in 1699 and sank in 1701 at Ascension Island on the return voyage.
- HMS Roebuck (1704) was a 42-gun fifth rate launched in 1704 and dismantled in 1725. She was rebuilt in 1722, and sunk in 1743 as a breakwater.
- HMS Roebuck (1743) was a 44-gun fifth rate launched in 1743 and sold in 1764.
- HMS Roebuck (1774) was a 44-gun fifth rate two-decker launched in 1774 and converted to a hospital ship in 1790. In 1799 she was converted to a troopship, and four years later to a guard ship. She was broken up in 1811.
- HMS Roebuck (1856) was a wooden screw gunvessel launched in 1856 and sold in 1864.
- HMS Roebuck (1901) was a Greyhound-class destroyer launched in 1901 and broken up in 1919.
- HMS Roebuck (H95) was an R-class destroyer launched in 1942. She was converted to a frigate in 1953 and was sold in 1968.
- HMS Roebuck (H130) was a survey ship launched in 1985, and was decommissioned in April 2010 and sold to the Bangladesh Navy.

== Battle honours ==
Ships named Roebuck have earned the following battle honours:

- Armada, 1588
- Cadiz, 1596
- Portland, 1653
- Gabbard, 1653
- Scheveningen, 1653
- Barfleur, 1692
- Velez Malaga, 1704
- Martinique, 1794
- Egypt, 1801
- China, 1860
- Sabang, 1944
- Burma, 1944–45
- East Indies, 1944−45
- Al-Faw, 2003
