= List of American football teams in the United Kingdom =

The Chester Romans (in red) in action against the Doncaster Mustangs during the BAFL's 2007 season

American football was introduced to the United Kingdom during the early part of the 20th century by American servicemen stationed in the country. The first recorded match took place on 23 November 1910 at Crystal Palace, London, where a team made up of the crew from USS Idaho defeated their counterparts from USS Vermont 19–0. During the Second World War, matches were played by American and Canadian servicemen stationed in the UK at venues throughout the country. This included the 'Tea Bowl' game played at the White City Stadium in 1944, and this was followed by the creation of the United States Armed Forces Europe (USAFE) league in 1946. This league consisted of teams from American military bases throughout Europe, with one of the league's three conferences made up of teams based in the UK – teams from this conference won the league championship thirteen times until the competition ceased in 1993.

The first teams open to British players were established in 1983, and competition began the following year in the form of a series of one-off games. The match results were compiled into a 'Merit Table', with teams playing more than three games eligible for the championship—the first champions were the London Ravens, who won all ten of their matches. Hundreds of clubs have since been formed, playing both full contact football and flag football at senior, university and youth level. Many of these clubs have since folded, renamed or merged with other local teams, but a few of the older clubs survive today.

The sport is administered by the British American Football Association (BAFA), with two main bodies of competition; the BAFA National Leagues (BAFANL) and the British Universities American Football League (operating as part of the British Universities and Colleges Sport competition).

== National Football League ==
As part of the NFL International Series, the National Football League, which otherwise has all of its teams resident in the United States, has one team with a permanent part-time residence in the UK.

Team	Location	Term	Frequency
Jacksonville Jaguars	Wembley Stadium, Wembley, London	2013–2020	One game per year
Jacksonville Jaguars	Tottenham Hotspur Stadium, London	2021–present	One game per year

The league also plays neutral-site games in London under the International Series banner. Since 2007, these have all been at Wembley Stadium; in 2019, the neutral-site games moved to the new home of Tottenham Hotspur.

== BAFA National Leagues ==
The BAFA National Leagues (BAFANL) was formed in 2010 by the BAFA in response to the British American Football League's decision to split from the governing body.

The senior league's membership comprises 68 teams based in towns ranging from Newquay in the south of England to Aberdeen in Scotland. The league is split into two regional conferences; the Southern Football Conference (SFC) and the Northern Football Conference (NFC). The teams within each conference are spread across three tiers with promotion and relegation between each level. The bottom two tiers are further divided into regional conferences. The top-ranking teams in each division compete in playoffs culminating in divisional finals—the championship game contested by the top Premier Division teams is known as the BritBowl. The 2017 champions are the Tamworth Phoenix, who defeated the London Blitz 34–28 in the final held at the Sixways Stadium.

In addition to adult contact football, the BAFA runs youth, junior and women's contact football, and also flag football across all age ranges. A number of the teams within the league operate teams across two or more of these competitions. The British American Football Association defines the age ranges used within the league as follows:

Designation	Ages (contact)	Ages (flag)
Adult	18 and above	16 and above
Women	17 and above	16 and above
Under 19s	16 to 19	—
Under 17s	14 to 17	17 and below
Under 12s	—	12 and below

Key
*	Team competing in the BAFANL's Adult Contact League (2020 season)

Team	Location	Years in Senior/Adult League	2020 BAFANL Adult Division	2020 BAFA Adult Adult Flag Football Division	2020 BAFA Under-19 Division	2020 BAFA Under-17 Division	Other teams
Aberdeen Oilcats	Aberdeen	—	—	Highland North / North	—	—	—
Aberdeen Roughnecks*	Aberdeen	2014–	NFC 1 North	—	—	—	—
Aylesbury Vale Spartans	Aylesbury	—	—	Southeastern / North	—	—	—
Basingstoke Barracudas	Basingstoke	—	—	Southeastern / South	—	—	—
Beeston Bears	Beeston, Nottinghamshire	—	—	Mid-England / South	—	—	—
Berkshire Renegades*	Reading	1985–87, 1989, 2006–2014, 2016—	SFC East 2	—	—	South	—
Birmingham Bulls*	Birmingham	1984–	NFC 2 South	—	—	Central	—
Birmingham Lions	Birmingham	—	—	Southwestern / North	South	Central	—
Black Country Vipers	Stourbridge	—	—	—	South	Central	—
Blisworth Five	Blisworth	—	—	Southeastern / North	—	—	—
Bournemouth Bobcats*	Bournemouth	1986–1991, 2011–	SFC 2 South	—	—	—	—
Bristol Apache*	Bristol	2011–	SFC West 2	—	—	—	—
Bristol Aztecs*	Bristol	1991–	Premier South	—	—	—	—
Buckinghamshire Wolves	Marlow	—	—	—	—	South	Youth flag, Cadet flag
Burnley Tornados*	Burnley	2015—	Associate	Mid-England / North	—	North West	8 vs 8 Contact League
Bury Saints*	Bury St Edmunds	2014–	SFC East 1	—	—	—	—
Calderdale Knights	Halifax	—	—	Mid-England / North	—	—	—
Cambridgeshire Cats*	Cambridge	1985–90, 1993–98, 2002–	SFC East 1	—	—	—	—
Cardiff Hurricanes	Cardiff	—	—	Southwestern / South	—	—	—
Carlisle Kestrels	Carlisle	2019—	Associate	—	—	—	—
Carlisle Sentinels	Carlisle	2015–2019	—	—	—	—	—
Carnegie Reapers	Dunfermline	—	—	Highland North / South	—	—	—
Carnegie Steelers	Dunfermline	—	—	Highland North / North	—	—	—
Chester Romans*	Chester	1987–	NFC South 1	—	North	North West	—
Chichester Sharks	Chichester	—	—	Southeastern / South	—	—	—
Chorley Buccaneers	Chorley	—	—	—	North	North West	Youth flag, Cadet flag
Clyde Valley Blackhawks*	Wishaw	2009–	NFC North 2	—	—	—	—
Cobham Cougars	Cobham, Surrey	—	—	—	South	South	—
Colchester Gladiators*	Wivenhoe	1985–95, 2005–	SFC East 2	—	—	South East	—
Cornish Sharks*	Newquay	2007–	SFC West 2	—	—	South West (development)	—
Coventry Cougars	Coventry	—	—	—	—	—	Youth flag, Cadet flag
Coventry Jets	Coventry	1991–93, 2004–2018	—	—	—	—	—
Crewe Railroaders*	Crewe	1985–90, 2012–	NFC 2 South	—	—	—	—
Doncaster Colts	Doncaster	—	—	—	—	North East / Yorkshire	—
Doncaster Mustangs*	Doncaster	2003–	NFC East 2	—	—	—	—
Dumfries Hunters*	Dumfries	2017—	NFC North 2	—	—	—	—
Dunbeth Dragons	Coatbridge	—	—	Highland North / North	—	—	—
Dundee Hurricanes	Dundee	2003–2019	—	—	—	—	—
Dunfermline Kings	Dunfermline	2017—	NFC North 2	Highland North / North	—	—	—
Dunfermline Revolution	Dunfermline	—	—	Highland North / North	—	—	—
East Essex Sabres*	Shoeburyness	2017—	SFC East 2	—	—	South East (development)	—
East Kent Mavericks*	Canterbury	2006–	SFC 1 East	—	—	South East	—
East Kilbride Pirates*	Hamilton	1986–	NFC North 1	—	North	Scotland	—
Edinburgh Napier Knights	Edinburgh	—	—	—	—	Scotland (development)	—
Edinburgh Outlaws	Edinburgh	—	—	Highland North / South	—	—	—
Edinburgh Wolves*	Edinburgh	2003–	Premier North	—	North	Scotland	—
Essex Spartans*	Billericay	1999–	SFC 2 East	—	—	South East	—
Etone Jaguars	Nuneaton	—	—	—	—	Central	—
Rushmoor Knights *	Farnborough	1986–	SFC Central 1	—	South	South West	—
Furness Phantoms*	Ulverston	2014–	NFC West 2	—	—	—	—
Gateshead Senators*	Gateshead	1986–	NFC North 2	—	—	North East / Yorkshire	—
Glasgow Hornets	Glasgow	—	—	Highland North / North	—	—	—
Glasgow Tigers*	Glasgow	1986–	NFC 1 North	—	—	Scotland (development)	—
Gloucester Centurions	Gloucester	2009–2014	—	Southwestern / South	—	—	—
Grangemouth Broncos	Grangemouth	—	—	Highland North / South	—	—	—
Halton Spartans*	Widnes	2015—	NFC South 1	—	—	North West (development)	—
Hamilton Buccaneers	Hamilton	—	—	—	—	Scotland	—
Hastings Conquerors*	Hastings	2015—	SFC East 2	—	—	—	—
Hereford Stampede*	Hereford	2020—	SFC Central 2	—	—	—	—
Hertfordshire Cheetahs*	Watford, Hertfordshire	1987–	SFC East 1	—	South	South	Youth flag, Cadet flag
Highland Stags	Inverness	2009–	Associate	—	North	Scotland	—
Horsham Buccaneers	Horsham	—	—	—	—	—	Youth flag
Humber Warhawks*	Kingston upon Hull	2015—	NFC 2 South	—	—	—	—
Inverclyde Goliaths*	Greenock	2018—	NFC North 1	—	—	Scotland	—
Ipswich Cardinals*	Ipswich	1987–	SFC 2 East	—	—	South East (development)	—
Jurassic Coast Raptors	Dorchester	2016—	SFC South 2	—	—	—	—
Kent Exiles*	Orpington	1991–	Premier South	—	South	South East / London (2 teams)	—
Kent Phoenix	Maidstone	—	—	—	—	South East	—
King's Lynn Patriots	King's Lynn	—	Associate	—	—	—	8 vs 8 League
Knottingley Raiders*	Knottingley	2017—	NFC 2 South	—	—	—	—
Lancashire Wolverines*	Blackburn	1988–2004, 2007–	NFC South 1	—	—	—	—
Leeds Academy Assassins	Leeds	—	—	—	North	North East / Yorkshire	—
Leeds Bobcats*	Leeds	2015	NFC East 2	—	—	—	—
Leeds Samurai	Leeds	—	—	Mid-England / North	—	—	—
Leeds Tornadoes	Leeds	—	—	Mid-England / North	—	—	—
Leicester Eagles	Leicester	—	—	Southwestern / North	—	—	—
Leicester Falcons*	Leicester	2008–	NFC South 1	—	—	Central	—
Leicester Huntsmen	Leicester	—	—	—	—	—	Youth Flag
Lincolnshire Bombers*	Lincoln, Lincolnshire	2007–	NFC East 2	—	North	North East / Yorkshire	—
Lincolnshire Longhorns	Lincoln, Lincolnshire	2018—	—	—	—	—	—
London Barracuda	London	—	—	Southeastern / South	—	—	—
London Blitz*	Finsbury Park	1984–	Premier South / SFC South 2 (London Blitz B)	Southeastern / South	South	London	Youth flag
London Hornets*	Camden Town	2014—	SFC East 1	—	—	—	—
London Olympians*	Crystal Palace	1984–2007, 2009–	Premier South	—	—	—	—
London Rebels	Kennington Park	—	—	Southeastern / South	—	—	—
London Smoke	Clapham Common	2018 -	—	—	—	—	London Flash
London Vipers	Crystal Palace	—	—	Southeastern / South	—	—	—
London Warriors*	Boston Manor	2008–	Premier South	—	—	London	—
Maidstone Pumas*	Maidstone	1998–2014, 2016—	SFC East 2	—	—	—	—
Manchester Crows	Manchester	—	—	Mid-England / South	—	—	—
Manchester Titans*	Manchester	2003, 2005–	Premier North	Mid-England / South	North	North West (2 teams)	—
Mansfield Honey Badgers	Mansfield	—	—	Mid-England / South	—	—	—
Merseyside Nighthawks*	Birkenhead	1986–	Premier North	—	North	North West (development)	—
Merthyr Tydfil Thunder Ducks	Merthyr Tydfil	—	—	Southwestern / South	—	—	—
Moray Tide	Lossiemouth	—	—	—	—	Scotland	—
Morecambe Bay Storm*	Morecambe	2017—	NFC West 2	—	—	—	—
Nairnshire Dragons	Nairn	—	—	—	—	Scotland (development)	—
Northern Nightmare	Sunderland	—	—	Highland North / South	—	—	—
Northants Knights*	Northampton	2019-	NFC 1 Midlands		D1 Midlands	D1 Midlands	
Northants Phantoms	Northampton	—	—	Southwestern / North	—	—	—
Northants Titans	Northampton	—	—	Southwestern / North	—	—	Youth flag
North East Academy	Newcastle upon Tyne	—	—	—	—	North East / Yorkshire	—
Northumberland Thunder	Cramlington	—	—	Highland North / South	—	—	—
Northumberland Vikings*	Woolsington	2015—	NFC North 1	—	—	—	—
Norwich Devils	Norwich	1986–2011, 2018	SFC East 2	—	—	South East (development)	—
Nottingham Caesars*	Nottingham	1995–	NFC South 1	—	North	—	—
Ouse Valley Eagles*	Bedford	2014	SFC Central 2	—	—	South	—
Oxford Killer Ponies	Oxford	—	—	Southwestern / South	—	—	—
Oxford Saints*	Abingdon	1984–	SFC Central 1	—	—	—	—
Peterborough Saxons	Peterborough	2002–2016	—	—	—	—	—
Plymouth Buccaneers	Plymouth	—	—	Southwestern / South	—	—	—
Portsmouth Dreadnoughts*	Portsmouth	2014–	SFC Central 1	—	—	—	—
Reading Lions	Reading	—	—	Southeastern / North & South (2 teams)	—	—	—
Rugby Maulers	Rugby	—	—	Southwestern / North	—	—	—
Sandwell Steelers*	Sandwell	2014–	Premier North	—	—	Central	—
Scunthorpe Alphas	Scunthorpe	2019–	Associate'	—	—	—	Youth Development
Sheffield Forge	Sheffield	—	—	—	—	North East / Yorkshire (development)	—
Sheffield Giants*	Sheffield	2010–	Premier North	Mid-England / South	—	North East / Yorkshire	—
Sheffield Vipers	Sheffield	—	—	Mid-England / North	—	—	—
Shrewsbury Sentinels	Shrewsbury	—	—	Southwestern / North	—	—	—
Shropshire Revolution*	Telford	2007–	NFC South 1	—	—	—	—
Solent Seahawks	Southampton	—	—	—	South	South West	—
Solent Thrashers*	Southampton	2005–	SFC Central 1	Southwestern / South	—	—	—
Somerset Wyverns	Taunton	2018	SFC West 2	—	—	South West	—
South Lincs Lightning	Bourne	2020-22					
South London Renegades	Southwark	—	—	—	—	London	—
South Wales Warriors*	Llanharan	1996–99, 2001–	SFC Central 1	—	—	—	—
Staffordshire Surge*	Stoke-on-Trent	1994–	NFC West 2	—	—	—	—
Studley Bearcats	Studley	—	—	—	—	—	Youth flag, Cadet flag
Sussex Thunder*	Brighton	1997–2013, 2015	SFC Central 1	—	—	South West	—
Swindon Storm*	Swindon	2013–	SFC South 2	—	—	South West	—
Tamworth Phoenix*	Tamworth	2008–	Premier North	—	—	Central	—
Torbay Trojans*	Paignton	1984–92, 1997–99, 2014–	SFC West 2	—	—	—	—
Victoria Park Panthers	Victoria Park, London	—	—	Southeastern / South	—	—	—
Ware Wolves	Ware	—	—	Southeastern / North	—	—	—
Wembley Five-O	Wembley	—	—	Southeastern / North	—	—	—
Wembley Stallions*	Wembley	2015—	SFC 1 East	—	—	London	—
West Coast Trojans	Renfrew	2005–2018	—	—	—	—	—
West Essex Showboats	Epping	—	—	Southeastern / North	—	—	—
West Lothian Astros	Livingston	—	—	Highland North / South	—	—	—
Westcliff Storm	Westcliff-on-Sea	—	—	Southeastern / North	—	—	—
Woodham Warriors	Woodham	—	—	Highland North / South	—	—	—
Worcester Royals	Worcester	—	—	Southwestern / North	—	—	—
Worcestershire Black Knights*	Worcester	2017—	SFC Central 2	—	—	—	—
Yorkshire Rams*	Leeds	1987–	NFC South 1	Mid-England / North	—	—	—

== Northern Ireland ==
Northern Irish teams compete in an amateur island-wide regional competition in Ireland, organised by American Football Ireland (AFI). Teams from Northern Ireland compete in both the Premier Division and Division 1 AFI competitions, as well as other competitions such as flag football and youth leagues.

As of 2025, Northern Irish teams include the Premier Division teams Belfast Trojans, Belfast Knights, and Craigavon Cowboys, as well as Division 1 teams Causeway Giants, County Antrim Stags, and Northwest Vipers. While some AFI teams from the Republic of Ireland are affiliated with universities, none of the teams in Northern Ireland have university affiliation.

Northern Irish teams have been successful in AFI competitions on numerous occasions, with top level Shamrock Bowl titles won by the Trojans (6 titles), Cowboys (3 titles), and Knights (3 titles).

Team	Location	Year entered league	2025 division
Belfast Knights	Belfast	1994	AFI Premier Division
Belfast Trojans	Belfast	2007	AFI Premier Division
Causeway Giants	Armoy, County Antrim	2018	AFI Division 1
County Antrim Stags	Belfast, County Antrim	2024	AFI Division 1
Craigavon Cowboys	Craigavon	1986	AFI Premier Division
Northwest Vipers	Greysteel, County Londonderry	2014	AFI Division 1

== British Universities and Colleges Sport ==
The British Universities American Football League (BUAFL) was formed in 2007 by the BAFA after the organisation that ran its predecessor ceased operations. Since 2012, the league has operated under the jurisdiction of British Universities and Colleges Sport (BUCS).

The league operates on three tiers – two Premier divisions (North and South) with 6 regional conferences in the lower two tiers – with most teams from the two Premier divisions competing in postseason Championship playoffs. A system of promotion and relegation is used between the three tiers. The two teams that progress through the playoffs compete in the National Championship Final (formerly the College Bowl) which is held at the South Leeds Stadium.

The 2016-17 champions are the Stirling Clansmen, who defeated the Durham Saints 10–7 in the final played at the Sixways Stadium, Worcester.

Team	University	Location	Year entered league	2017–18 division	2019-20 division	2022-23 division
Aberdeen	University of Aberdeen	Aberdeen				2 Borders
ARU Rhinos	Anglia Ruskin University	Cambridge	2012	2A South East	2 South East	2 Midlands
Bangor Muddogs	Bangor University	Bangor	2009	2A North	2 North	2 North
Bath Killer Bees	University of Bath	Bath	1992	Premier South	1 South West	2 South West
Bath Spa Bulldogs	Bath Spa University	Bath	2010	2A South West	2 South West	2 South West
Bedfordshire Bulls	University of Bedfordshire	Bedford	2017	2A Midlands		
Birmingham Lions	University of Birmingham	Birmingham	1989	Premier South	Premier South	Premier South
Bournemouth University Bobcats	Bournemouth University	Bournemouth	2014	2A South West	2 South West	1 South West
BNU Buccaneers	Buckinghamshire New University	Chalfont St Giles	2008	2A South		
Bradford Bears	University of Bradford	Bradford	2011	2A North	2 North	2 North
Brighton Panthers	University of Brighton	Brighton	2003	2A South	1 South	2 South
Bristol Barracuda	University of Bristol	Bristol	2007	2A South West	2 South West	1 South West
Brunel Burners	Brunel University	Uxbridge	2010	1A South	1 South East	1 South East
Cambridge Pythons	University of Cambridge	Cambridge	2011	1A South East	2 South East	2 Midlands
Canterbury Christ Church Chargers	Canterbury Christ Church University	Canterbury	2009	1A South East	2 South East	2 South East
Cardiff Cobras	Cardiff University	Cardiff	1987	1A South West	1 South West	Premier South
Chester Legion	University of Chester	Chester	2016	2A North	2 Midlands	
Chichester Spitfires	Chichester University	Chichester	2014	2A South	2 South	2 South
City Wolfpack	City University London	Islington, London	2013	2A South	2 South East	2 South East
Coventry Jets	Coventry University	Coventry	2010	2A Midlands	Premier North	1 Midlands
Derby Braves	University of Derby	Derby	1996	Premier North	1 Midlands	2 Midlands
DMU Lions (Formerly DMU Falcons)	De Montfort University	Leicester	2011	2A Midlands	1 Midlands	2 Midlands
Durham Saints	Durham University	Durham	2007	Premier North	Premier North	Premier North
Edge Hill Vikings	Edge Hill University	Ormskirk	2015	2A North	2 North	2 North
Edinburgh Napier Knights	Edinburgh Napier University	Edinburgh	2004	1A North	1 North	2 Borders
Edinburgh Predators	University of Edinburgh	Edinburgh	2009	2A Borders	1 North	1 Borders
Essex Blades	University of Essex	Colchester	2001	2A South East	1 South East	1 South East
Exeter Demons	University of Exeter	Exeter	2009	1A South West	1 South West	1 South West
Glasgow Tigers	University of Glasgow	Glasgow	1986	1A North	2 Borders	1 Borders
Gloucestershire Gladiators	University of Gloucestershire	Cheltenham	2010	2A South West	2 South West	2 South West
Greenwich Mariners	University of Greenwich	Crystal Palace	2004	2A South East	2 South East	2 South East
Heriot-Watt	Heriot-Watt University	Edinburgh	2015	2A Borders	2 Borders	2 Borders
Hertfordshire Hurricanes	University of Hertfordshire	Hatfield	1994	Premier South	Premier South	1 South
Huddersfield Hawks	University of Huddersfield	Huddersfield	2007	2A Midlands	2 Midlands	
Hull Sharks	University of Hull	Kingston upon Hull	1985	1A North	1 North	1 Borders
Imperial Immortals	Imperial College London	South Kensington	2009	1A South East	1 South East	1 South East
KCL Regents	King's College London	Southwark	2010	2A South	2 South East	2 South East
Keele Crusaders	Keele University	Keele	2013	2A North	2 Midlands	2 Midlands
Kent Falcons	University of Kent	Canterbury	1996	1A South East	1 South East	1 South East
Kingston Cougars	Kingston University	Kingston upon Thames	2012	1A South	2 South	2 South East
Lancashire Rams	University of Lancashire	Preston	2012	1A Yorkshire	1 Yorkshire	2 North
Lancaster Bombers	Lancaster University	Lancaster	1991	2A Borders	2 North	2 North
Leeds Beckett Carnegie	Leeds Beckett University	Leeds	2009	Premier North	Premier North	Premier North
Leeds Gryphons	University of Leeds	Leeds	1990	1A Yorkshire	1 Yorkshire	1 Borders
Leicester Longhorns	University of Leicester	Leicester	1985	1A Midlands	2 Midlands	2 Midlands
Lincoln Colonials	University of Lincoln	Lincoln	2006	2A Midlands	2 Midlands	2 Midlands
Liverpool Raptors	University of Liverpool	Liverpool	2015	2A North	2 North	2 North
Liverpool John Moores Fury	Liverpool John Moores University	Liverpool	2008	1A Yorkshire	1 Yorkshire	1 North
Loughborough Legion	Loughborough University	Loughborough	1988	Premier North	1 Midlands	1 Midlands
Manchester Tyrants	University of Manchester	Manchester	2009	2A North	2 North	1 North
MMU Eagles	Manchester Metropolitan University	Manchester	2011	2A Midlands	2 North	1 North
Newcastle Raiders	Newcastle University	Gateshead	1985	2A Borders	1 North	Premier North
Northampton Nemesis	University of Northampton	Northampton	2011	2A Midlands		
Northumbria Mustangs	Northumbria University	Gateshead	2008	1A North	1 North	1 Borders
Nottingham Bandits	University of Nottingham	Nottingham	1996	1A Midlands	Premier North	Premier North
Nottingham 2nd team	University of Nottingham	Nottingham			2 Midlands	2 Midlands
NTU Renegades	Nottingham Trent University	Nottingham	2009	1A Midlands	1 Midlands	1 Midlands
OBU Panthers	Oxford Brookes University	Oxford	2010	2A South West	2 South	2 South
Oxford Lancers	University of Oxford	Oxford	2012	2A South West	2 South	1 South
Plymouth Blitz	University of Plymouth	Plymouth	2001	1A South West	2 South West	2 South West
Portsmouth Destroyers	University of Portsmouth	Portsmouth	2006	Premier South	1 South	1 South
Queen Mary and Barts London Vipers	Queen Mary, University of London	London	2016	2A South East	1 South East	1 South East
Reading Knights	University of Reading	Reading	1987	1A South	1 South	2 South
Royal Holloway Bears	Royal Holloway, University of London	Egham	2005	2A South	1 South	1 South
SGS Pride	South Gloucestershire and Stroud College	Bristol				Premier South
Sheffield Hallam Warriors	Sheffield Hallam University	Sheffield	2003	1A Yorkshire	1 Yorkshire	1 North
Sheffield Sabres	University of Sheffield	Sheffield	2000	1A Yorkshire	1 Yorkshire	1 North
Solent Redhawks	Southampton Solent University	Southampton	2009	1A South West	2 South West	2 South
Southampton Stags	University of Southampton	Southampton	1989	2A South West	1 South West	1 South West
Staffordshire Stallions	Staffordshire University	Stoke-on-Trent	1992	1A Midlands	2 Midlands	1 Midlands
Stirling Clansmen	University of Stirling	Stirling	1985	Premier North	Premier North	Premier North
Sunderland Serpents	University of Sunderland	Sunderland	2004	1A North	2 Borders	2 Borders
Surrey Stingers	University of Surrey	Guildford	1994	1A South	1 South	2 South
Sussex Saxons	University of Sussex	Falmer	2013	1A South	2 South	1 South
Swansea Titans	Swansea University	Swansea	2009	Premier South	Premier South	1 South West
Tarannau Aberystwyth	Aberystwyth University	Aberystwyth	1992	2A North	2 North	2 South West
Teesside Cougars	Teesside University	Middlesbrough	1985	2A Borders	2 Borders	2 Borders
UCL Emperors	University College London	London	2016	2A South	2 South	2 South East
UEA Pirates	University of East Anglia	Norwich	1987	1A South East	Premier South	Premier South
UEL Titans	University of East London	London	2015	2A South East	2 South East	2 South East
UWE Bullets	University of the West of England	Filton	1992	1A South West	Premier South	Premier South
UWE 2nd team	University of the West of England	Filton			2 South West	2 South West
UWS Pyros	University of the West of Scotland, Paisley Campus	Paisley	2003	2A Borders	2 Borders	2 Borders
Warwick Wolves	University of Warwick	Warwick	1989	1A Midlands	1 Midlands	1 Midlands
Winchester Silverbacks	University of Winchester	Winchester			2 South	2 South
Worcester Royals	University of Worcester	Worcester	2009	2A Midlands	1 South West	2 South West
York Centurions	University of York	York	2009	2A Borders	2 Borders	2 North
YSJ Jaguars	York St John University	York	2017	2A Borders	2 Borders	2 North

== Exhibition Teams ==
The following teams are Exhibition teams who play several annual games on the continent against a European League team. The team is made up of a selection of BAFANL players from other sides.

Team	Location	Term	Frequency
The Thundering Herd	Travelling Exhibition Team	2017–2019	One game per year
Sealand Seahawks	Travelling Exhibition National Team	2021–	Several games per year

== British Armed Forces Teams ==
Team	Location	Term	League
British Army Jackals	DMS Whittington, Staffordshire	2021–	Armed Forces
Royal Air Force Mustangs	RAF Waddington, Lincolnshire	2021–	Armed Forces
Royal Navy	Portsmouth, Hampshire	2021–	Armed Forces

== 8GL League ==
The 8GL League is an 8 vs 8 Adult contact League, initially set up as a separate entity not under the governing body of the British American Football Association.

Team	Location	Term
King's Lynn Patriots	King's Lynn, Norfolk	2020–
Leigh Miners	Tyldesley, Greater Manchester	2019–2020
Midland Storm	Birmingham	2019-
Pennine Panthers	Burnley, Lancashire	2019–
St Helens Cardinals	St Helens, Merseyside	2019–
Warrington Storm	Warrington, Cheshire	2019–
Warwickshire Bears	Warwick, Warwickshire	2019–
Wigan Raiders	Wigan, Greater Manchester	2019–

== American High School League in Europe ==
The American High School League in Europe (also referred to as High School Football Europe) is a competition organised by the European branch of the Department of Defense Dependents Schools. The teams in this league are drawn from high schools affiliated with US military bases within Europe, with the exception of South Gloucestershire and Stroud College which is a further education college located in Filton, England. The league in its present format was founded in 1975, with its constituent teams divided into three divisions. All teams play a regular season schedule against the other teams in their regional conference, with the top-ranked teams competing in playoffs to decide the divisional champions. As of 2017, only one team based in the United Kingdom competes in the league, compared to the five teams that competed in 2012.

Team	Location	Division
Alconbury Dragons	Alconbury High School, Alconbury	—
Bristol Academy PRIDE	South Gloucestershire and Stroud College, Filton	—
Lakenheath Lancers	Lakenheath High School, RAF Lakenheath	Division I
Menwith Hill Mustangs	Menwith Hill Elementary/High School, RAF Menwith Hill	—
Southbank Blackhawks	Southbank International School, London	—

== Bristol Academy Community League ==
The Bristol Academy Community League (BACL) is a competition set up by the Bristol Academy of Sport in December 2012 for school pupils in Bristol and its surrounding areas. The league provides competition for players in the 14-17 and 17-20-year age brackets. The league comprises six teams, representing a specific geographic area.

Team	Area represented
Bristol Cowboys	Central Bristol
Bristol Gators	Bath and East Bristol
Bristol Bobcats	South Gloucestershire and North Bristol
Bristol Falcons	Somerset and South Bristol
Swindon Storm	Swindon
Welsh Tomahawks	Newport
