= List of sports rivalries in the United Kingdom =

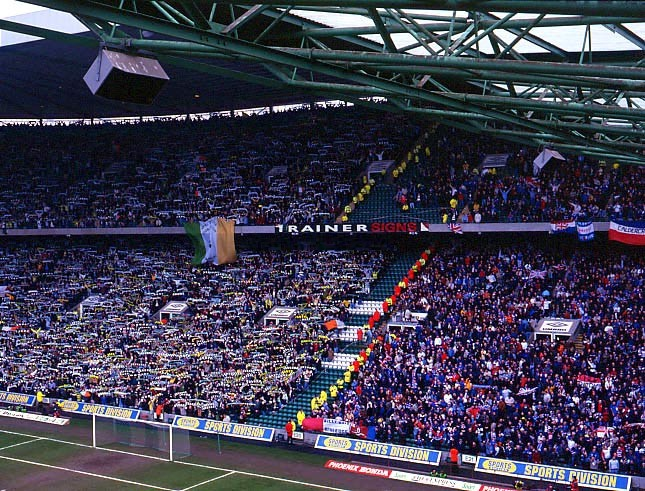
The Old Firm derby between Celtic and Rangers is widely considered the greatest in British sports. This image showing the separation of the two fanbases on derby day.

This is a list of the main sporting local derbies and other sports rivalries in the UK.

== England ==
=== American football ===
- Bristol–South Wales rivalry: Bristol Aztecs vs. South Wales Warriors
- Cheshire derby: any match between Chester Romans, Crewe Railroaders and Halton Spartans
- East Anglian derby: Ipswich Cardinals vs. Norwich Devils
- Essex Derby: Essex Spartans vs. East Essex Sabres.
- Farnham–Kent rivalry: Farnham Knights vs. Kent Exiles
- Humber–Lincolnshire rivalry: Humber Warhawks vs. Lincolnshire Bombers.
- Kent–London rivalry: Kent Exiles vs. London Olympians.
- Knottingley–Leeds rivalry: Knottingley Raiders vs. Leeds Bobcats
- Leeds derby: Leeds Bobcats vs. Yorkshire Rams.
- Leicester–Nottingham rivalry: Leicester Falcons vs. Nottingham Caesars
- London derby: London Blitz vs. London Warriors, can also refer to games for either against the London Olympians.
- Manchester–Merseyside rivalry: Manchester Titans vs. Merseyside Nighthawks
- North East derby: Gateshead Senators vs. Northumberland Vikings
- South Coast derby: Portsmouth Dreadnoughts vs Solent Thrashers
- Swindon–Oxford rivalry: Swindon Storm vs. Oxford Saints
- West Midlands derby: any match between Birmingham Bulls, Sandwell Steelers and Tamworth Phoenix
- Yorkshire derby: any match between Doncaster Mustangs, Sheffield Giants and Yorkshire Rams

=== Basketball ===
- Leicester Riders vs. Newcastle Eagles
- Glasgow Rocks vs. Newcastle Eagles
- North-East derby: Durham Wildcats vs. Newcastle Eagles
- Yorkshire Derby: Leeds Force vs Sheffield Sharks

=== Cricket ===
- London derby: Middlesex CCC vs. Surrey CCC
- The Oldest Rivalry: Kent CCC vs. Surrey CCC
- War of the Roses: Lancashire CCC vs. Yorkshire CCC
- West Midlands derby: Warwickshire CCC vs. Worcestershire CCC
- Battle of the Bridge: Essex CCC vs. Kent CCC
- South Coast: Hampshire CCC vs. Sussex CCC

=== eSports ===
- El Nashico: Lionscreed vs. Ruddy Esports

=== Ice hockey ===
- Basingstoke Bison vs. Guildford Flames
- Bracknell Bees vs. Slough Jets
- Milton Keynes Lightning vs. Peterborough Phantoms
- Nottingham Panthers vs. Sheffield Steelers
- Tyne-Tees derby: Billingham Stars vs. Whitley Bay Warriors
- Essex derby: Romford Raiders vs. Chelmsford Chieftains

=== Korfball ===
- Big Two derby: Bec KC vs. Trojans KC
- Manchester derby: Manchester Hawks vs. Manchester Warriors
- Milton Keynes derby: MK Bucks vs. MK Lakers

=== Motorcycle Speedway ===
- Somerset derby: Swindon Robins vs. Somerset Rebels

=== Rugby league ===
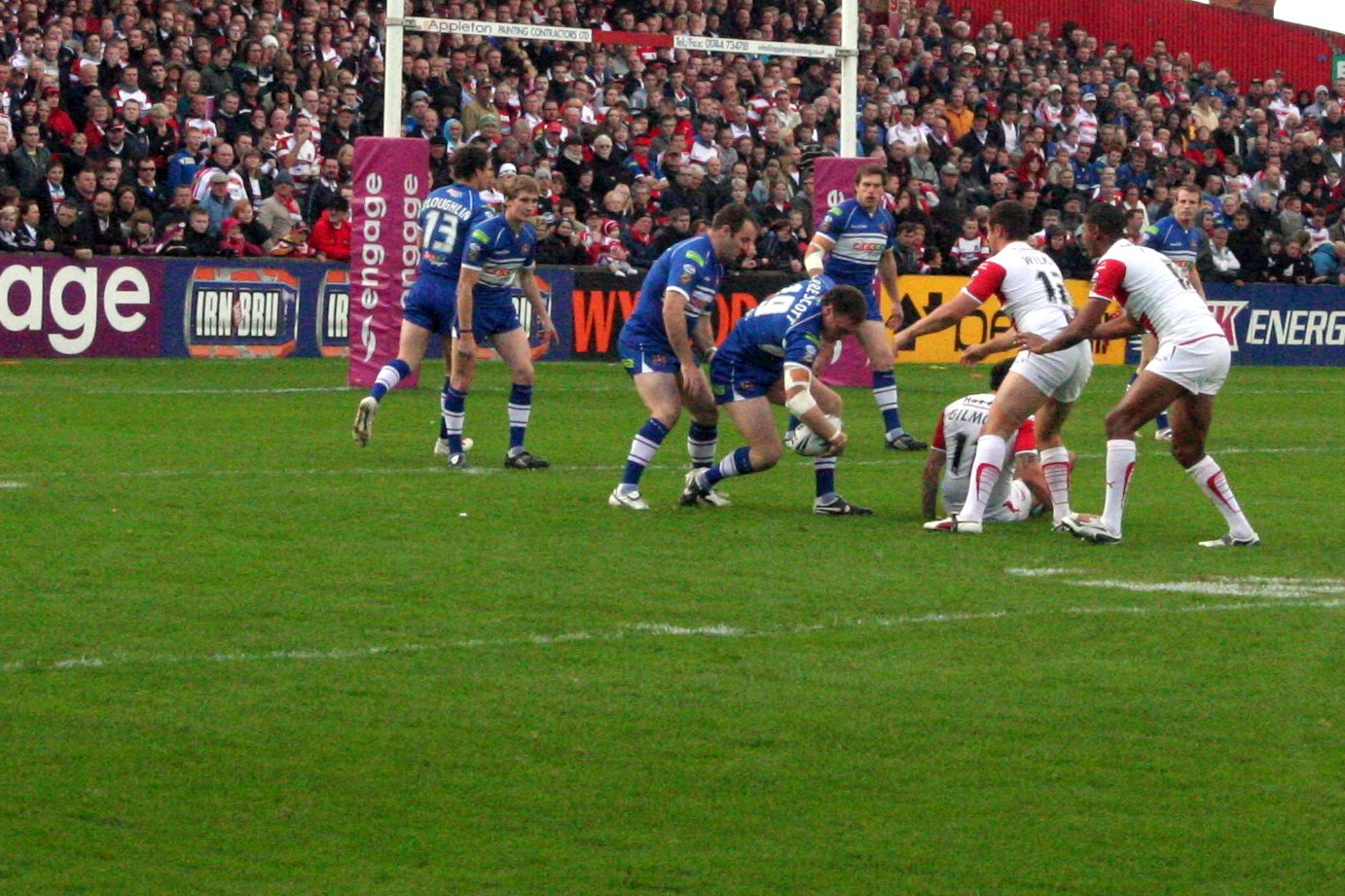
A Good Friday Derby in 2009

- The Battle of the Borough Derby: Leigh Centurions vs Wigan Warriors
- The Calder Derby: Castleford Tigers vs Wakefield Trinity
- The Cheshire Derby: Widnes Vikings vs. Warrington Wolves
- The Cumbrian Derby: Whitehaven vs. Workington Town
- The East Lancashire Derby: Oldham Roughyeds vs. Rochdale Hornets
- The Five Towns Derby: Castleford Tigers vs. Featherstone Rovers
- The Good Friday Derby: St. Helens v Wigan Warriors
- The Heavy Woollen Derby: Batley Bulldogs vs. Dewsbury Rams
- The Hull Derby: Hull F.C. vs. Hull Kingston Rovers
- The Leeds Derby: Leeds Rhinos vs. Hunslet
- The London Derby: London Broncos vs. London Skolars
- The Locker Cup Derby: Warrington Wolves vs. Wigan Warriors
- The Roses Derby: Oldham Roughyeds or Rochdale Hornets vs. Huddersfield Giants or Halifax
- The Salford Derby: Salford Red Devils vs. Swinton Lions
- The South Yorkshire Derby: Sheffield Eagles vs. Doncaster
- The War of the Roses Derby: Leeds Rhinos vs. Wigan Warriors
- The West Yorkshire Derby: Bradford Bulls vs. Leeds Rhinos (The term is also used to describe a four way rivalry with the addition of Huddersfield Giants and Halifax)

=== Rugby union ===
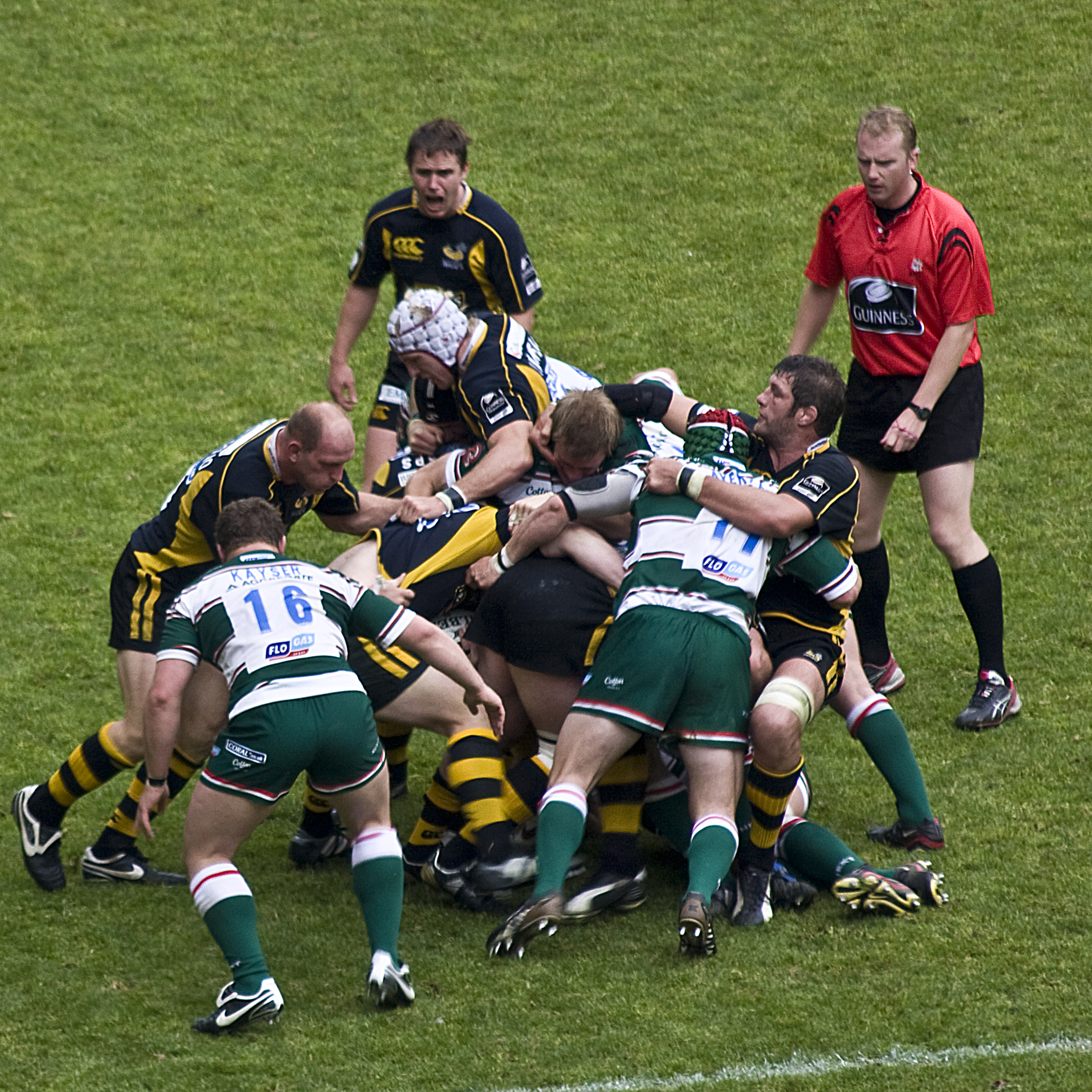
Wasps vs Tigers in the 2008 Premiership Final

- The London Derby: Harlequin F.C. vs. Saracens F.C.
- The East Midlands Derby: Leicester Tigers vs. Northampton Saints
- Bath-Bristol derby: Bristol Rugby vs. Bath Rugby
- West Country derby: Gloucester Rugby vs. Bath Rugby
- The New West Country derby: Bristol Rugby vs. Exeter Chiefs
- Milton Keynes derby: Bletchley RUFC vs. Milton Keynes RUFC vs. Olney RFC
- Former West London/Hampstead FC Split Derby: Wasps RFC vs. Harlequin F.C.
- M69 Derby: Wasps RFC vs. Leicester Tigers
- Former Thames Valley Derby: Wasps RFC vs. London Irish RFC
- Exiles Derby: London Irish RFC vs. London Welsh RFC vs. London Scottish RFC
- South Hampshire derby: Havant RFC vs. Gosport and Fareham R.F.C.
- Hertfordshire derby: Old Haberdashers RFC vs. Tabard RFC
- Luton-Dunstable derbies: Luton RFC vs. Dunstablians RFC vs. Stockwood Park RFC
- North Devon derby: Barnstaple RFC vs. Bideford RFC
- Beds derby/ The Battle for Bedfordshire: Bedford Blues vs. Ampthill RUFC
- RAG derby: London Scottish v Richmond

== Northern Ireland ==
=== Gaelic football ===
- Armagh–Tyrone rivalry: Armagh v Tyrone
- Sperrin derby: Derry v Tyrone
- Armagh-Down rivalry: Armagh v Down

== Scotland ==
=== American football ===
- East Kilbride–Edinburgh rivalry: East Kilbride Pirates vs. Edinburgh Wolves
- Glasgow derby: East Kilbride Pirates vs. Glasgow Tigers

=== Basketball ===
- Edinburgh derby: Boroughmuir Blaze vs. City of Edinburgh Kings

=== Cricket ===
- Edinburgh Derby: Carlton Cricket Club vs. Grange Cricket Club

=== Ice Hockey ===
- Scottish derby:
  - Fife Flyers vs. Braehead Clan
  - Braehead Clan vs. Edinburgh Capitals
  - Braehead Clan vs. Dundee Stars
- Dundee-Kirkcaldy derby: Fife Flyers vs. Dundee Stars
- Forth derby: Fife Flyers vs. Edinburgh Capitals

=== Motorcycle Speedway ===
- Scottish Speedway Derby: Edinburgh Monarchs vs. Glasgow Tigers

=== Rugby union ===
- 1872 Cup: Edinburgh vs. Glasgow Warriors

=== Shinty ===
- Badenoch derby: Kingussie Camanachd vs. Newtonmore Camanachd Club

== Wales ==
=== Association football ===
- Anglesey derby: Llanfairpwll vs. Llangefni Town
- Gwynedd derby: Bangor City, Caernarfon Town or Porthmadog
- A40 Derby: Haverfordwest County vs. Carmarthen Town
- Flintshire derby: Connah's Quay Nomads vs. Flint Town United (also known as Deeside derby)
- North East Wales Derby: Wrexham A.F.C. Women vs. Connah's Quay Nomads (Only applies to the women's leagues in Wales as the men's teams play in different pyramids)
- Cross Borders Derby: The New Saints vs any combination of Wrexham A.F.C. Women (Women's league only) or Connah's Quay Nomads
- El Twitico: Llantwit Major AFC vs. Ammanford AFC

Defunct

- North Wales derby: Rhyl F.C. vs. Bangor City

Rhyl Vs Nfa Rhyl derby

=== Rugby league ===
- Welsh Derby: North Wales Crusaders vs. West Wales Raiders (defunct)

=== Rugby union ===
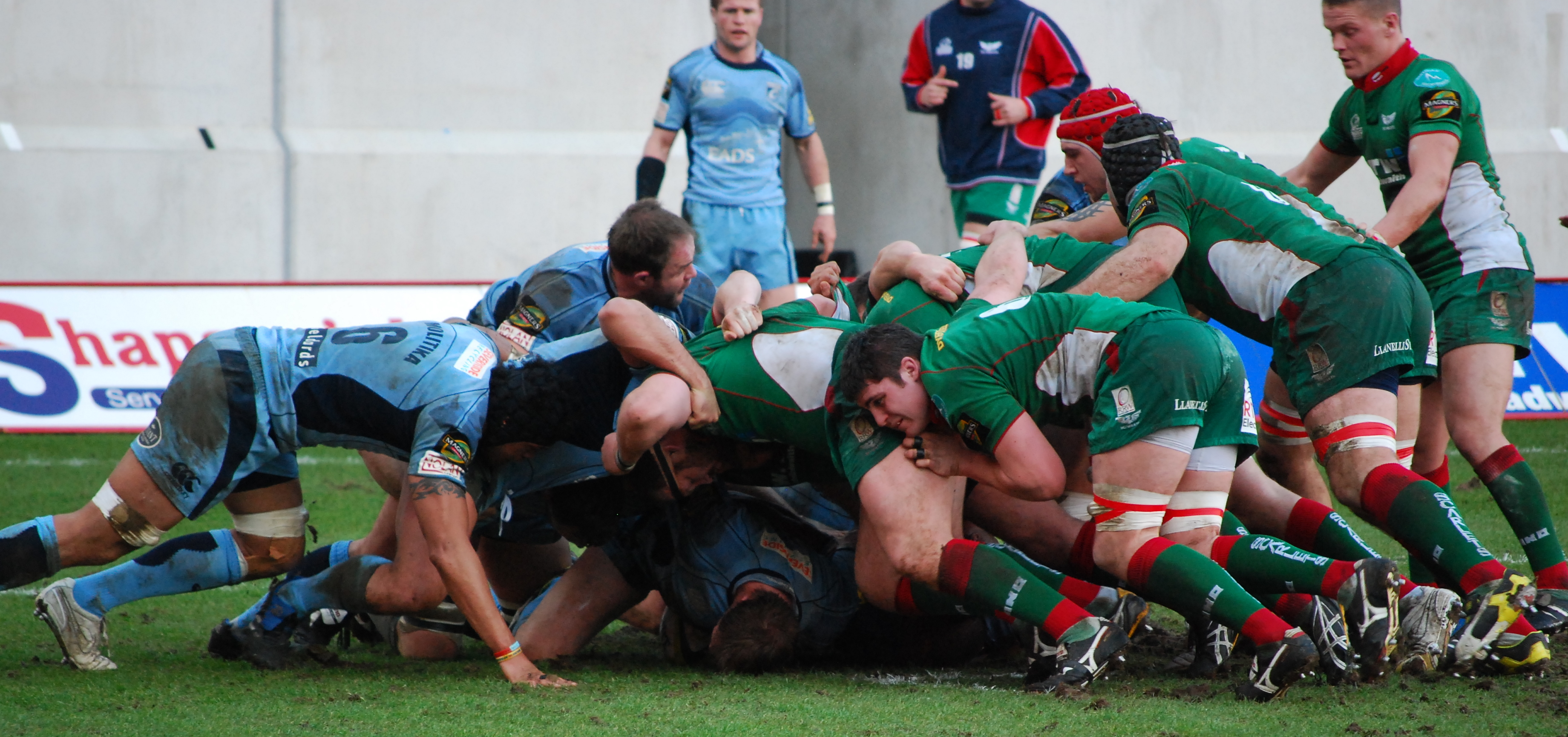
A Judgement Day rivalry, Scarlets vs Cardiff Blues

- Judgement Day rivalries consist of any match between Ospreys, Dragons, Scarlets, and Cardiff Blues. Specific rivalries with these four include:
  - West Wales Derby: Ospreys vs. Scarlets
  - South Wales Derby: Ospreys vs. Cardiff Blues
  - East Wales Derby: Cardiff Blues vs. Dragons

== See also ==
- List of association football rivalries in the United Kingdom
