= Leeds Bobcats =

American Football team based in the United Kingdom

- Founded: 2008
- Dissolved: 2021
- League: BAFA National Leagues
- Division: Associate
- Location: Leeds, West Yorkshire
- Stadium: West Leeds RUFC
- Colours: Gold Helmets; White, Navy & Gold Jerseys; White & Navy Pants
- Head coach: n/a
- General manager: N/a
- Division titles: 2016, 2017
- Playoff berths: 2016, 2017, 2019

The Leeds Bobcats were a British American football team based in Leeds, West Yorkshire who played in the BAFA National Leagues. The club was formed as the Bobcats in 2008 as a youth football team following ties with the Celina Bobcats from Texas. A Bobcats senior team began playing associate Football from 2011 onwards until being granted BAFA status in 2014 in order to debut in the 2015 season. The club has since grown from strength to strength from then onward making it to the playoffs in their second season.

Just before the start of the 2022 season, The Bobcats announced they had resigned their BAFANL spot, and would be demoting themselves to the BAFA Associate programme. Furthermore the club announced they were being absorbed into the programme of their local rivals the Yorkshire Rams and would be known as the Yorkshire Academy Rams thus becoming the Rams development team, however despite announcing their intention to operate, by 20 February 2023 the team had yet to begin operations.

== History ==
=== Early history ===
In 2008 members of the Leeds American Football team youth squad were invited to Texas by the Celina Bobcats, who were the Division Three All Star State Champions, following tuition and guidance to form their own team back in England, the Leeds Bobcats were born. In 2010, the Bobcats Youth team won its first trophy after defeating the Colchester Gladiators in the final of a 5 team tournament. Several members of the Bobcats juniors went on to represent Great Britain at youth level and in 2011 the majority of the team progressed to senior level and the Bobcats became a Senior associate team.

=== Debut campaign ===
In 2014, the Bobcats were granted BAFA status in order to debut in the 2015 season. The club were entered into the BAFA NFC South 2 along with the Lincolnshire Bombers, Leicester Falcons, Sandwell Steelers, Humber Warhawks and the Peterborough Saxons. The Bobcats debuted in a 54–0 defeat by Sandwell and would only record two victories over Humber in their first season, although the club heavily improved from a poor start and came close to beating both Peterborough and Leicester.

=== Recent seasons ===
In 2017, former Running Back and Special Teams Coach, Miles Stanford replaced Paul Goodward as Head Coach after he vacated the position following a long and successful tenure.

After promotion following the 2017 campaign, the Bobcats spent a single season in BAFA Division 1 North during 2018, culminating in relegation back to Division 2. Fergus O'Neil then took up Head Coaching duties in 2019, leading the Bobcats to BAFA Division 2 North Playoff Quarter Finals, where they were knocked out by Scottish side Clyde Valley Blackhawks.

For the 2020 season, highly experienced player and coach Chris Peel was appointed to the Head Coach position to lead the team in the BAFA NFC 2 East after re-alignment from the NFC 2 Central division.

=== League resignation and merger ===
Just before the start of the 2022 season, The Bobcats announced they had resigned their BAFANL spot, and would be demoting themselves to the BAFA Associate programme. Furthermore the club announced they were being absorbed into the programme of their local rivals the Yorkshire Rams, thus becoming the Rams development team.

== Home ground ==
The club is based at West Leeds RUFC, Blue Hill Lane, Leeds, LS12 4NZ.

== Team records ==
Year	Div	Conf	W	L	T	PFor	PAgt	PApg	%
2015	2	South	2	8	0	193	315	31.5	0.20
2016	2	West	9	1	0	368	131	13.1	0.90
2017	2	Central	10	0	0	437	111	11.1	1.00
2018	1	North	0	9	0	54	346	34.6	0.00
2019	2	Central	6	2	0	256	115	14.4	0.75
2019	2	East	–	–	–	–	–	–	–

== Fixtures and results ==
=== 2015 ===
Date	H/A	Teams	Result	W/L
05/04/15	A	Sandwell Steelers v Leeds Bobcats	44-00	L
26/04/15	H	Leeds Bobcats v Sandwell Steelers	06-57	L
03/05/15	A	Humber Warhawks v Leeds Bobcats	16–52	W
17/05/15	H	Leeds Bobcats v Lincolnshire Bombers	26–40	L
24/05/15	H	Leeds Bobcats v Leicester Falcons	07-27	L
21/06/15	A	Peterborough Saxons v Leeds Bobcats	40–13	L
28/06/15	H	Leeds Bobcats v Peterborough Saxons	16–28	L
05/07/15	A	Lincolnshire Bombers v Leeds Bobcats	27–15	L
19/07/15	A	Leicester Falcons v Leeds Bobcats	36–13	L
02/08/15	H	Leeds Bobcats v Humber Warhawks	46-00	W

=== 2016 ===
Date	H/A	Team	Result	W/L
10/04/16	A	Chester Romans v Leeds Bobcats	25–34	W
17/04/16	A	Halton Spartans v Leeds Bobcats	08-26	W
24/04/16	A	Walney Terriers v Leeds Bobcats	06-26	W
22/05/16	H	Leeds Bobcats v Crewe Railroaders	72-07	W
05/06/16	A	Walney Terriers v Leeds Bobcats	00-40	W
19/06/16	H	Leeds Bobcats v Crewe Railroaders	01-FF	W
03/07/16	H	Leeds Bobcats v Chester Romans	38–41	L
10/07/16	H	Leeds Bobcats v Walney Terriers	42-03	W
24/07/16	H	Leeds Bobcats v Halton Spartans	46–12	W
14/08/16	A	Crewe Railroaders v Leeds Bobcats	29–44	W
21/08/16	H	(P-QF) Leeds Bobcats v Shropshire Revolution	52–21	W
28/08/16	A	(P-SF) Newcastle Vikings v Leeds Bobcats	51–14	L

=== 2017 ===
Date	H/A	Team	Result	W/L
30/04/17	A	Northumberland Lightning v Leeds Bobcats	00-46	W
07/05/17	A	Carlisle Sentinels v Leeds Bobcats	06-18	W
14/05/17	A	Walney Terriers v Leeds Bobcats	00-32	W
21/05/17	A	Knottingley Raiders v Leeds Bobcats	06-62	W
04/06/17	H	Leeds Bobcats v Walney Terriers	62–12	W
11/06/17	A	Morecambe Bay Storm v Leeds Bobcats	26–44	W
25/06/17	H	Leeds Bobcats v Carlisle Sentinels	52-07	W
16/07/17	H	Leeds Bobcats v Morecambe Bay Storm	66-08	W
30/07/17	H	Leeds Bobcats v Knottingley Raiders	01-00	W
13/08/17	H	Leeds Bobcats v Gateshead Senators	54–46	W
20/08/17	H	(P-QF) Leeds Bobcats v Staffordshire Surge	52-08	W
27/08/17	H	(P-SF) Leeds Bobcats v Glasgow Tigers	20–38	L

=== 2018 ===
Date	H/A	Team	Result	W/L
14/04/18	A	Yorkshire Rams v Leeds Bobcats	31–0	L
06/05/18	A	Glasgow Tigers v Leeds Bobcats	20–6	L
03/06/18	A	Lancashire Wolverines v Leeds Bobcats	49–12	L
10/06/18	H	Leeds Bobcats v Glasgow Tigers	16–20	L
17/06/18	H	Leeds Bobcats v Lancashire Wolverines	0–58	L
01/07/18	H	Leeds Bobcats v Gateshead Senators	20–28	L
08/07/18	A	Northumberland Vikings v Leeds Bobcats	48–0	L
15/07/18	H	Leeds Bobcats v Yorkshire Rams	0–67	L
22/07/18	H	Leeds Bobcats v Northumberland Vikings	NP-1	L
05/08/18	A	Gateshead Senators v Leeds Bobcats	25–0	L

=== 2019 ===
Date	H/A	Team	Result	W/L
28/04/19	A	Morecambe Bay Storm v Leeds Bobcats	12–42	W
19/05/19	A	Halton Spartans v Leeds Bobcats	35–14	L
02/06/19	H	Leeds Bobcats v Morecambe Bay Storm	44–12	W
09/06/19	H	Leeds Bobcats v Furness Phantoms	66–0	W
16/06/19	H	Leeds Bobcats v Knottingley Raiders	44–0	W
07/07/19	A	Furness Phantoms v Leeds Bobcats	FF-1	W
21/07/19	H	Leeds Bobcats v Halton Spartans	6–36	L
28/07/19	A	Knottingley Raiders v Leeds Bobcats	20–40	W
11/08/19	A	(P-QF) Clyde Valley Blackhawks v Leeds Bobcats	26–8	L

=== 2020 ===
Date	H/A	Team	Result	W/L
12/04/20	A	Knottingley Raiders v Leeds Bobcats	–	
07/06/20	H	Leeds Bobcats v Lincolnshire Bombers	–	
14/06/20	A	Doncaster Mustangs v Leeds Bobcats	-	
21/06/20	H	Leeds Bobcats v Humber Warhawks	–	
05/07/20	H	Leeds Bobcats v Knottingley Raiders	–	
19/07/20	A	Lincolnshire Bombers v Leeds Bobcats	–	
26/07/20	H	Leeds Bobcats v Doncaster Mustangs	–	
02/08/20	A	Humber Warhawks v Leeds Bobcats	–	
