= Lincolnshire Bombers =

American Football team based in the United Kingdom

- Founded: 1984; 2005 (reformed)
- League: BAFA National Leagues
- Division: NFC South 2
- Location: North Hykeham, Lincolnshire
- Stadium: North Hykeham RUFC, Memorial Hall
- Colours: Black Helmets; Red Jerseys; Black Pants
- Head coach: Michael Etheridge
- General manager: Adam Thompson
- Division titles: 1993
- Playoff berths: 1988, 1989, 1993, 2018, 2019
- Website: www.lincolnshirebombers.co.uk

The Lincolnshire Bombers are a British American football team based in North Hykeham, Lincolnshire, England. The team in its current form was founded in 2005. They currently play in the BAFA NFC South 2 for the 2019 season. The original team the Lincoln Bombers were formed in the late 1980s and in 1992 the team was renamed the Lincoln Saints. The Saints were 1993 National First Division champions. Following several mergers with other regional clubs The Saints disbanded leaving the county without an American Football team until the club reformed in 2005.

== History ==
=== Early history ===
American football was first played in Lincolnshire in the early 1980s, with sides such as the Scunthorpe Steelers, Boston Blitz and Lincoln Bombers being the county's first exponents of the sport. The 1990s saw a period of change after Scunthorpe's demise, the Lincoln Bombers became the Lincoln Saints, going on to achieve glory by lifting the BNGL First Division title in 1993; the Boston/South Lincs Blitz would eventually merge with nearby teams in King's Lynn and Peterborough to form the North Sea Hurricanes. Both teams would eventually disappear in the mid nineties; however a strong youth presence would be maintained in the county with the Haven/UCLA club in Boston and the Lincoln/Doncaster merger in the UDL Longhorns.

The Lincoln Saints, who evolved from the Bombers' original incarnation, participated in the British National Gridiron League between 1992 and 1993. The side won the 1993 BNGL First Division Bowl with a 51–14 win against Redbridge Fire. The Haven/UCLA outfit converted to senior football at the turn of the millennium and would become known as the East Midland Saxons senior team. Having lost their facilities in 2002 the team moved to Spalding for two seasons and then, after reorganisation, moved out of the county to Peterborough. In 2005 Lincolnshire was effectively without gridiron of any sort until the arrival of team founder Iain Bushell. Iain had played previously for the Manchester Titans and Teesside Cougars clubs and on his relocation to Lincoln was keen to revive the sport in the county.

=== Reformation ===
The name "Bombers" was resurrected due to the county's continuing links with the Royal Air Force, and Bushell's personal links with the RAF Waddington base. He was initially helped in his task by former Bombers and Saints kicker, Nigel Smith. He then recruited former Haven/UCLA & East Midland GM and head coach Pat Megginson who was looking for a new challenge since leaving the (now) Peterborough-based Saxons. A healthy squad started to take shape featuring ex-Nottingham Caesars players – and one-time Lincoln juniors – Ian Askew and Neil Armitage plus former Haven/UCLA and East Midland Saxons players Nige Epton, Mat Dean and Chris Henry. Former Saints coach Tony Hughes, Herts University player/coach Jeremy Brown, Dale Bridges and David Quincey (returning to football from the old Boston Blitz organisation) helped strengthen the club off the pitch, along with a highly professional management team. The Bombers are now a county wide team, with members now representing a number of towns across Lincolnshire.

=== 2012 season ===
After one of the longest losing streaks in British league history, the Bombers finally won on the opening day of the 2012 season against the Durham County Presidents. The 2012 season will go down as one of the worst seasons, weather-wise, for British American football. Having the season shortened due to the Queen's Diamond Jubilee celebrations and the Olympics was issue enough but then persistent rain only made things worse when trying to reschedule matches. Unfortunately, the Bombers had to accept a 1–1 draw for their home match against the Sheffield Predators due first to a waterlogged pitch and then the inability of BAFRA to provide referees for the rescheduled match. Crewe Railroaders visited RAF Cranwell on 8 July and were soundly beaten by the Bombers, 53–8. An eleventh-hour save by the management teams at Staffordshire Surge, Lincolnshire Bombers and Crewe Railroaders allowed the return fixture between the Railroaders and the Bombers to take place at the Longton Rugby Club on 15 July, after the weather left Crewe with a waterlogged pitch. The result of this match was a 30–30 tie. The Bombers closed out their best season to date with a win over the DC Presidents with the final score of 39–9.

=== The American revolution ===
In 2013 Texas native Michael Etheridge took over as head coach and the following year the team would go on to add fellow Americans to the roster. Laron Worsley (RB), Eddie Parliman (LB), Michael Brewer (DL) and Jonathan Culver (WR) The star performer would be Culver, who could operate at quarterback and running back if called upon. The team were voted the "BAFA Underdog of the Year" for the 2014 season following a 4–5–1 record in which the team pulled off impressive victories over the Oxford Saints, Sandwell Steelers, Peterborough Saxons and the Shropshire Revolution. At the end of the season Jonathan Culver scooped the end of season awards but was the only American player retained for 2015, although he would be joined by quarterback Taylor Umland.

The Bombers' 2015 campaign was hit and miss with a substantial amount of injuries effecting a promising and play-off chasing season. The team would finish the year with a 4–6 record in the newly formed BAFA NFC 2. Offensive Linemen Mikey Gray, a former local wrestler would scoop all the major awards at the end of the season, while the departing Jonathan Culver was inducted into the Bombers' Hall of Fame. In 2016 The Bombers suffered an exodus of playing staff during the off-season which culminated in the loss of some of the club's better players. A fresh-faced Bombers unit heavily loaded with rookies battled to a 0–10 record.

=== Winning season ===
The 2017 season saw the Lincolnshire Bombers post up their first ever winning season. Victories over the Staffordshire Surge and Halton Spartans as well as double wins over Humber Warhawks and Crewe Railroaders saw the Bombers finish with a 6–4 record. A final day 15–9 defeat to the Chester Romans was the only thing preventing them from making their first ever play-off appearance.

=== Bombers making history ===
After the denial of a chance of the playoffs in the previous season, the Lincolnshire Bombers defied the odds. Going in to the middle of the 2018 season with a 0–4 record, both losses to the recently relegated Birmingham Bulls (American football) and eventual Division 2 South champions Staffordshire Surge, it was questionable as to whether they would appear. Then after an inspiring speech from their head coach, Michael Etheridge, the Bombers got their much needed first win against the Knottingley Raiders. This provided the momentum to give their next three wins against Crewe Railroaders, Humber Warhawks and second win against Knottingley Raiders to bring their record to 4–4. The 50–26 win against the Knottingley Raiders made the Bombers the highest scoring team in the BAFANL Division 2 South, scoring 241 points making an average of 30.125 ppg. The first playoff match in their 13-year history was met with defeat from the Chester Romans with a final score of 6–46.

The 2019 season saw another progression for the Bombers. A return to the play-offs would ensue following a regular season best 6–2 finish including home and away victories over the 2018 Divisional Champions Staffordshire Surge. The post-season campaign would fall short at the hands of the eventual Division 2 North Champions Inverclyde Goliaths 22–18 in the Bombers first-ever home play-off game after reforming.

== Name ==
The Bombers take their name from "Bomber County" the nickname given to Lincolnshire during World War II which was home to a large concentration of Royal Air Force and USAAF bomber stations. The Bombers were initially just called the Lincoln Bombers but prior to finding out whether or not they had made it into the BAFL for 2007, it was decided that they would, from then on, be known as the Lincolnshire Bombers. Reasons include media coverage throughout the county, and the desire to represent the home towns of many of the players.

== Bombers Youths ==
The Lincolnshire Bombers Youth team, ages 14–19 began operating in the 2015 season under the stewardship of club founder, Iain Bushell. The Bombers U17 side became North East champions in 2016 and qualified for the national play-offs.

== Home ground ==
Between 1992 and 1993, The Lincoln Saints played their home games at Mulsanne Park, the home ground of association football club Nettleham F.C. Having been reformed in 2005, The Bombers played their home games at RAF Cranwell near Sleaford but moved to operate from Christ's Hospital School close to Lincoln Cathedral. In 2018 the club moved to Memorial Hall in North Hykeham for both home games & training.

== Hall of Fame ==
Former head coach, Tony Hughes was inducted into the Bombers Hall of Fame in 2014 as well as general manager Mark Harrison. Also inducted was quarter back and club founder Iain Bushell and in 2015 American wide receiver Jonathan Culver was also inducted.
(England) Iain Bushell (QB) 2005–2014
(United States) Jonathan Culver (WR) 2013–2015
(England) Mark Harrison (DL) 2005–2011
(England) Tony Hughes (Head Coach) 1987–1989
(England) Michael Sharp (OL) 2010–2016
(England) Kris Ashton (OL, DL) 2017–2024

== James Benson Memorial Award ==
Introduced in 2024, the James Benson Memorial Award is named in memoriam of James Benson, who died in October 2023. This award is handed out to the "Bombers of the Year".

Year	Winner
2024	(United Kingdom) John Milford

== Player of the Season ==
Year	Player's Player of the Year	Coaches Player of the Year
2013	(United Kingdom) Scott Harrington (LB)	(United Kingdom) Tom Hutchinson (DB)
2014	(United States) Jonathan Culver (WR)	(United Kingdom) Kevan Woollas (DL)
2015	(Principality of Sealand) Mikey Gray (OL)	(Principality of Sealand) Mikey Gray (OL)
2016	(Ghana) Charles Osei (OL)	(Ghana) Charles Osei (OL)
2017	(United Kingdom) Andy Bagnall (QB)	(United Kingdom) Jack Paddison (RB)
2023	(United Kingdom) Adam Simeoni (LB)	(United Kingdom) Adam Simeoni (LB)
2024	(United Kingdom) Douglas Kirk-Bellamy (DB)	(United Kingdom) Douglas Kirk-Bellamy (DB)
2025	(United Kingdom) Jordan Robson (WR)	(United Kingdom) Jordan Robson (WR)

== Season records ==
Complete records for the club under all three identities. 1987 to 1989 as Lincoln Bombers, 1992 to 1993 as Lincoln Saints and 2006 to present day for Lincolnshire Bombers.

Season	League	Level	Regular season record			Postseason	Notes
Season	League	Level	Wins	Losses	Ties	Postseason	Notes
1987	UKAFL Central B	2	8	2	0	–	–
1988	Budweiser League Division 1	2	7	3	0	Yes	Quarter finals, Realigned to Premier Division
1989	Duke League Premier Division	1	7	3	0	Yes	Quarter finals, Resigned from the League
1992	BNGL Division 1 North Midlands	2	4	6	0	–	Club reformed and entered League.
1993	BNGL Division 1 North	2	9	1	0	Yes	Runners-up in the Final, Resigned from the League.
2006	BAFAL Division 2 Northern	2	0	10	0	–	Club reformed and entered League.
2007	BAFAL Eastern Conference Two	2	1	9	0	–	–
2008	BAFAL Eastern Conference Two	2	0	10	0	–	–
2009	BAFAL Eastern Conference Two	2	0	10	0	–	–
2010	BAFAL Eastern Conference Two	2	0	10	0	–	–
2011	BAFANL Eastern Conference Two	2	0	10	0	–	–
2012	BAFANL Central Conference 2	2	4	4	0	–	–
2013	BAFANL National Central	2	0	10	0	–	–
2014	BAFANL National Central	2	4	5	1	–	Club realigned into the new Division 2.
2015	BAFANL NFC South 2	3	4	6	0	–	–
2016	BAFANL NFC South 2	3	0	10	0	–	–
2017	BAFANL NFC South 2	3	6	4	0	–	–
2018	BAFANL NFC South 2	3	4	4	0	Yes	Quarter finalists
2019	BAFANL NFC South 2	3	6	2	0	Yes	Quarter finalists
2020	BAFANL NFC South 2	3	0	0	0	–	Season cancelled due to COVID-19 pandemic.
2021	BAFANL Central East	–	2	6	0	–	Exhibition season due to COVID-19 pandemic.
2022	BAFANL NFC South 2	3	6	2	0	–	–
2023	BAFANL NFC West 2	3	2	6	0	–	–
2024	BAFANL NFC East 2	3	2	6	0	–	–
2025	BAFANL NFC 2 Midlands	3	3	4	0	Season Not Yet Complete	Season Not Yet Complete
Total			79	143	1	All-time regular season record	

=== Playoffs ===
Year	Stage	Opponent	W/L	Score
1988	Budweiser Division 1 Quarter Final	Ipswich Cardinals	Loss	14-62
1989	Duke Premier Division Quarter Final	KL Rebels	Loss	3–18
1993	BNGL Division 1 Quarter Final	Yorkshire Rams	Won	21–13
1993	BNGL Division 1 Semi Final	Cambridge Cats	Won	31–27
1993	BNGL Division 1 Final	Redbridge Fire	Won	51–14
2018	BAFANL Division 2 Quarter Final	Chester Romans	Loss	6–46
2019	BAFANL Division 2 Quarter Final	Inverclyde Goliaths	Loss	18–22

== Honours ==
- BGNL First Division: Champions – 1993 (as Lincoln Saints)
- BAFA U17 North East Division: Champions – 2016
