= Peterborough Saxons =

Former American football team based in the United Kingdom (2001–2016)

- Established: 2001
- Folded: 2016
- Based in: Peterborough
- Home stadium: Thorney Rugby Club; Crowland Road; Thorney; Peterborough; PE6 0PB
- League: BAFANL

Personnel
- Head coach: Gary Van Zandt
- General manager: Chris Dahl

Championships
- League titles (0): None
- Division titles (0): 2012
- Website: https://www.peterboroughsaxons.com/

Uniform
Home

Away

The Peterborough Saxons were a British American football team based in Thorney, Cambridgeshire. They played in the BAFA Nation League's Midlands Conference Division One for the 2016 season but dropped out the League after one regular season game. The senior team was first formed in 2001 as the East Midlands Saxons and entered senior competition the following year. Particular seasons of note are 2008, 2012, and 2015, where the Saxons have won a significant number of games, achieved the play-offs or final, and achieved promotion. The Saxons folded in 2016 following an opening day defeat to the Nottingham Caesars.

== History ==
=== East Midlands Saxons (2001–2007) ===
The East Midlands Saxons were officially formed in late 2001 as a means of allowing players from the local UCLA Renegades youth kitted team to continue playing after they reached the cut-off age for youth football. Playing their home games in Boston, Lincolnshire, they were accepted into the British Senior League for the 2002 season, where they competed in Division Two North. Their largely inexperienced squad was largely drawn from the UCLA Renegades youth team and a former senior team called the Haven Raiders. They also joined with a number of veteran players from defunct teams previously based in Kings Lynn, Boston and Peterborough. It was a struggle for most of the season and the team failed to win any of their games, losing seven and drawing three.

The Saxons relocated to Spalding Rugby Club in 2003. In their opening match the recorded their first victory at this level, a 31–12 win over the Manchester Titans. The Saxons won a further two games.before losing their final five games, failing to score in three of them and finishing with a 3–6–1 record

The team moved to the Castle Sports Centre in Spalding, where they played their home games for the 2004 season in the reorganised Division Two North. They suffered due to only having 3 coaches and injuries which saw them travel to several games with under 20 fit players. This led to them forfeiting their final match of the season. They lost all nine of their regular season games, only scoring 20 points.

In 2005 the team was realigned to the British American Football League Division Two East and moved their home games to Stanground College in Peterborough. This move proved beneficial as they were able to recruit more players, doubling their squad size from an average of 20 to over 45. All three of the team's victories came against the Merseyside Nighthawks, whom they had failed to beat in each of their previous meetings. This number of wins was repeated the following season in 2006, with the highlight being their 14–13 victory over the Norwich Devils.

After spending a season in the Eastern conference, the Saxons were once again realigned into the Central conference of Division Two for the 2007 season. After narrowly losing their first two games, they then won seven out of their last eight games and scored a total of 236 points, the fifth best total in the country. In doing so, they finished second in their group, easily qualifying for the post-season playoffs for the first time in their history. The Saxons were given a long journey north to play the Dundee Hurricanes, and lost a close game 8–14.

=== Peterborough Saxons (2008–2015) ===
The 2008 season saw the newly renamed Peterborough Saxons better the previous season's record, only losing twice, to local rivals the Cambridgeshire Cats, scoring 379 points, only being outdone by division champions, the London Cobras. They also recorded their largest-ever victory, an 80–0 win over the MK City Pathfinders. The Saxons’ last home game of the season was a local derby against the Bedfordshire Blue Raiders, which was played at nearby RAF Alconbury, in front of over 1000 spectators. The Saxons won the inaugural Tri-Base Bowl 35–3 to secure their place in the playoffs for the second year running. With 4 seconds left, the visiting Cornish Sharks scored a wild-card playoff winning field goal, securing a 6–9 win.

Another league re-shuffle, saw the Saxons promoted to Division 1 for the 2009 season. The jump proved difficult, but the team remained competitive, securing 3 wins, and posting a .500 record in the 2010 season.

2011 was perhaps the closest the Saxons have come to extinction. After a poor pre-season, which saw plenty of seasoned veterans move to other teams, the Saxons only managed to play three games. After the last game the GM and head coach announced their retirement from the team. The Saxons remained thanks to the efforts of player turned GM Ryan Toone. Ryan Toone remained as the general manager until the end of the 2015 season, being replaced by Chris Dahl. The team returned in 2012 and continue to play in the BAFA National Leagues after recruiting veteran, and championship winner, William White as the head coach. Under William White the Saxons had an unbeaten season. Unfortunately, the Saxons lost in the final to the Sheffield Predators in overtime. The 2013 season, saw yet more divisional re-alignments, with Peterborough again being promoted, this time to the Premiership South. The top flight of British American football was a huge test for the team as a whole and the Saxons finished with a record of 2–8, victories at South Wales Warriors and Ipswich Cardinals along with several tight games, including narrow losses to East Kent Mavericks and Sussex Thunder led to an acceptable season for a team jumping up two divisions to compete with the best of the country.

Gary Van Zandt was the obvious choice to take the helm, with an impressive football career both in the UK and in the States, and a lot of time working with the Saxons. The coaching re-shuffle went alongside a back room change, with a new committee helping to manage the team to ensure the Saxons will continue for years to come. After many years of playing at various locations around Peterborough the committee negotiated a home at Thorney RUFC, who provide excellent facilities and room for the team to grow.

A solid off season and recruitment drive, introduced plenty of rookies to the sport, mixed with seasoned veterans helped to refresh and build the squad. A management decision to drop from the Premiership to rebuild the team and start afresh, the 2014 season was contested in the National Division Central; against such seasoned opponents as Leicester Falcons, Shropshire Revolution, Oxford Saints, Lincolnshire Bombers and BAFANL new boys Sandwell Steelers.

The 2014 was a successful campaign under the circumstances. A squad made up of over 50% rookies, managed to win the first 3 games of the season, the only team matching the division favourites, the Oxford Saints. A season full of hard-fought matches, with a small squad, had taken its toll. Going into the final game, the Saxons were sitting in 3rd place, with an outside chance of winning the title, this was unfortunately negated by a 28–0 shutout, securing the division for the Shropshire Revolution. The Saxons remaining a respectable 3rd place with a winning 6-4-0 season.

2015 had yet another league re-shuffle, moving Oxford and Shropshire out of the new third tiered BAFANL NFC II South division, and adding Leeds Bobcats and Humber Warhawks, in their inaugural seasons. The Saxons had a great season and surpassed plenty of people expectations. The only teams to beat the Saxons were the Leicester Falcons and the Sandwell Steelers, who went on to beat the Saxons in the Daffodil Bowl.

== Season records ==
Season	Division	Wins	Losses	Ties	PF	PA	Final position	Playoff record	Notes
2002	BSL Division Two South	0	7	3	44	211	6 / 6	–	–
2003	BSL Division Two North	3	6	1	99	205	8 / 11	–	–
2004	BSL Division Two North	0	9	0	20	260	6 / 6	–	–
2005	BAFL Division Two Central	3	7	0	96	282	3 / 4	–	–
2006	BAFL Division Two East	3	7	0	146	204	4 / 4	–	–
2007	BAFL Division Two Central	7	3	0	236	72	2 / 5	Lost 8–14 to Dundee Hurricanes in quarter-finals.	–
2008	BAFL Division Two East	8	2	0	379	44	2 / 5	Lost 6–9 to Cornish Sharks in wild-card playoff.	Team renamed Peterborough Saxons prior to start of season. Promoted to Division 1.
2009	BAFL Division One South East	3	7	0	165	259	5 / 6	—	—
2010	BAFL Division One South East	5	5	0			4 / 6	—	—
2011	BACAFL Division One Central	0	10	0	20	97	6 / 6	—	Relegated to Division 2 due not finishing 2011 season
2012	BAFANL Division Two East	10	0	0	176	44	1 / 6	Won against Cornish Sharks, Won against Milton Keynes Pathfinders, Lost in the final to Sheffield Predators 33-36	Promoted to the Premiership for the first time in its history
2013	BAFANL Premier South	2	8	0	84	266	10/11		Saxons chose to move to Division 2
2014	BAFANL Division Two Central	6	4	0	191	191	3/6		
2015	BAFANL Division Two North Football Conference South	7	3	0	345	150	2/6	Won against West Coast Trojans, Won against Manchester Titans, Lost in the Daffodil Bowl to Sandwell Steelers 7-24	Promoted to the Midlands Football Conference Division 1
2016	BAFANL Division One Midlands Football Conference	0	1	0	0	18	6/6	—	After forfeiting Games 2 and 3 the Saxons folded after only playing one fixture during the 2016 season.
