= De Montfort Park =

Football stadium in Leicestershire, England

Leicester Road Stadium, Greene King Stadium
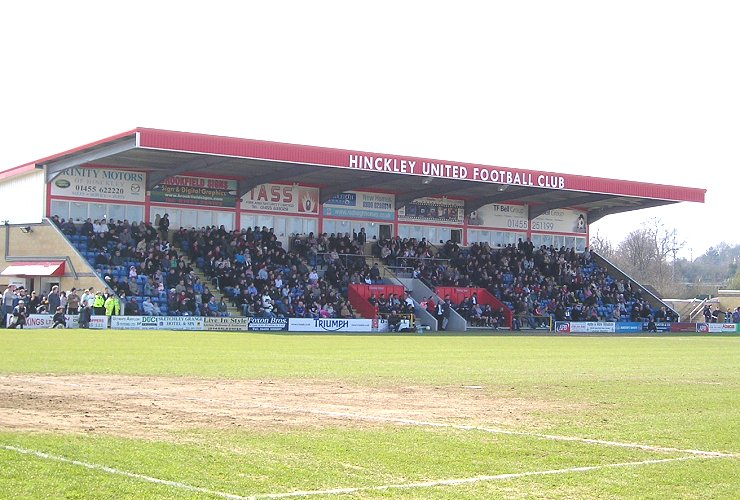
- Interactive map of Leicester Road Stadium, Greene King Stadium
- Full name: De Montfort Park
- Former names: Marston's Stadium (2004–2008); Greene King Stadium (2009–2013)
- Location: Leicester Road, Hinckley, Leicestershire, LE10 3DR
- Coordinates: 52°33′32.82″N 1°20′25.44″W
- Owner: Leicester Road Stadium Ltd, Hinckley Stadium Ltd, Downes Properties Ltd, 3G Hinckley Ltd
- Operator: Leicester Road Stadium Ltd, Hinckley Stadium Ltd, Downes Properties Ltd, 3G Hinckley Ltd
- Capacity: 4329 (630 seated)
- Surface: Grass
- Field size: 110 yards (100 m) x 72 yards (66 m)

Construction
- Groundbreaking: 2002
- Built: 2003–2005
- Opened: 5 March 2005
- Cost: £4 Million
- Architect: Savage Hayward
- Main contractor: FE Downes LTD

Tenants
- Hinckley United – 2005–2013; Aston Villa Reserves – 2009–2012; Leicester City Reserves – 2006–2008; Hinckley LRFC – 2014–2025; Leicester Falcons – 2015–2018

De Montfort Park was the first name given to a football stadium built off Leicester Road in Hinckley, Leicestershire. It was the home of Hinckley United, an English football club from the town, until it was dissolved in October 2013. The main stadium is now the home of Hinckley LRFC.

The main football stadium was renamed Leicester Road Stadium on 6 June 2013.

The site covers 22 acres (9 ha) and includes three full size pitches, two three-quarter size pitches, three half size pitches and a full size, all-weather floodlit 3G rubber crumb surface pitch. It is named in honour of Simon de Montfort, 6th Earl of Leicester.

The flagship of the complex is the Leicester Road Stadium, a 4,329 capacity purpose-built football ground, comprising a gymnasium, sports injury clinic and a social club. The Stadium opened in March 2005 when Stalybridge Celtic were the first team to play Hinckley United on the ground, in front of a crowd of over 2000.

== Stadium Sponsorship ==
When the Stadium opened in 2005 it was known as the Marston's Stadium, following a sponsorship deal between Hinckley United and Marston's Brewery. The Brewery paid what Regional Sales Manager Bob Leatherland called a 'substantial six figure sum' to secure the naming rights with the money paid out at £25,000 per year over a ten-year period. However, the brewery altered its sponsorship strategy, moving mainly into the cricket Twenty20 competition, and the deal ended early in a mutual agreement between the brewery and football club at the end of December 2008.

In January 2009 the club announced a stadium sponsorship deal with the Greene King Brewery and the stadium was renamed the Greene King Stadium. The sponsorship deal with Greene King Brewery ran out at the end of the 2012–2013 season, as confirmed by Chairman Mike Sutton.

The stadium name has not been sponsored since and is simply referred to now as Leicester Road Stadium.

== Stands ==
- The Main Stand – The Main Stand holds 630 covered seats. The complex houses the changing rooms, gymnasium, lounge, boardroom and offices of the football club. VP's Club Bar and the Sponsors' Lounge are located at the top of the Main Stand, overlooking the pitch.
- The East Terrace – The East Terrace Stand is a large covered terrace.
- The Tom Powers Stand – The Tom Powers Stand is covered standing room with a capacity of 1095. It is named by the landowner who originally sold the land to Hinckley United, enabling them to build the stadium.

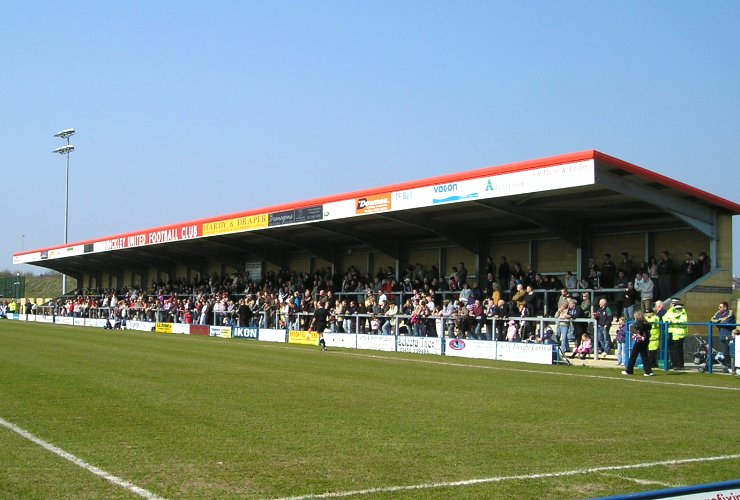
the Tom Powers Stand

- The West Side – Currently the West Side is hard standing for 586 spectators. The grounds changing rooms are located here.

The stadium has provision for segregated seating of away stands with 80 seats on the Main Stand and 850 places on the West Stand. The Away Turnstiles are only operable when segregation is in place.

== Other uses ==
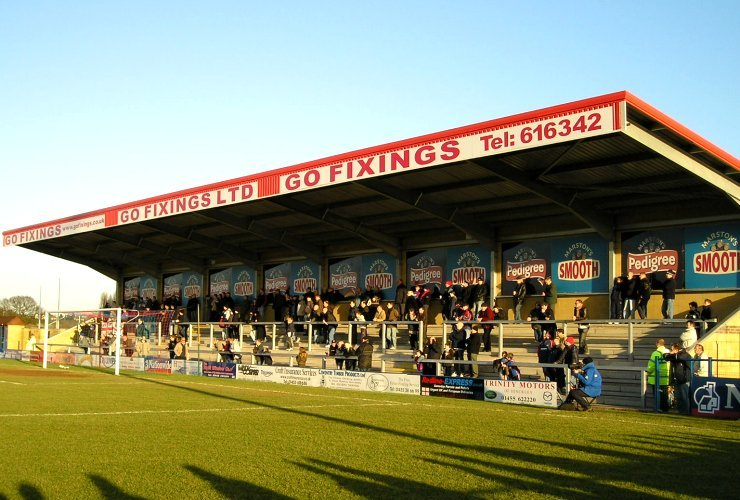
the East Stand

Leicester City reserves have used the De Montfort Park Stadium for their home games in 2006, 2007 and 2008.

Aston Villa reserves used Greene King Stadium for their home games in 2009, 2010, 2011 and 2012.

The stadium is used by the Leicestershire FA for finals of their regional competitions. It staged International Youth games in 2006. England U19s used the facilities for training in 2006 ahead of a match against the Czech Republic at Northampton's Sixfields Stadium.

In April 2007, April 2008 and April 2010 the Stadium was used by the English FA as a semi final venue for the National FA Sunday Cup.

Aston Villa Reserves use the stadium for a selection of their winter home games from 2009 to 2012.

In April 2012 the FA announced that the Stadium would be one of the venues for the UEFA European Women's U17 Championship Finals.

In July 2012 the Stadium was selected for two international Men's U17s matches, alongside Burton's Pirelli Stadium and Northampton's Sixfields Stadium, as part of a friendly tournament involving England, Italy, Turkey and Portugal. The stadium hosted the Portugal U17s 1–0 Italy U17s, and Italy U17s 3–1 Turkey U17s matches.

In 2012 the stadium was also proposed as a new home for Coventry City F.C., due to mounting debts regarding the Ricoh Arena and arguments that the rent is far too high in comparison to clubs around them and below the Premier League

In December 2013 Leicester Road Stadium hosted 4 UEFA Women's U17 European Cup Final group fixtures. Germany vs Scotland, France vs Spain, Italy vs Portugal and Spain vs Germany.

In August 2014 Leicester Road Football Club (later renamed Hinckley LRFC) were accepted into the Midland Football League Division 2 and took over Leicester Road Stadium.

In 2015, it was announced the stadium will be used as the home ground for the Leicester Falcons American football team.

== Record Attendance ==
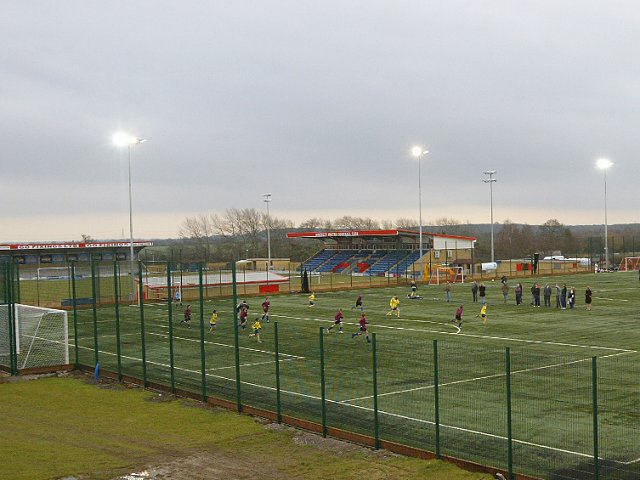
the All Weather Floodlit pitch

- 3,411 Hinckley United vs Leicester City, 24 July 2012, Pre-season Friendly.
