= Sean Payton =

American football coach and player (born 1963)

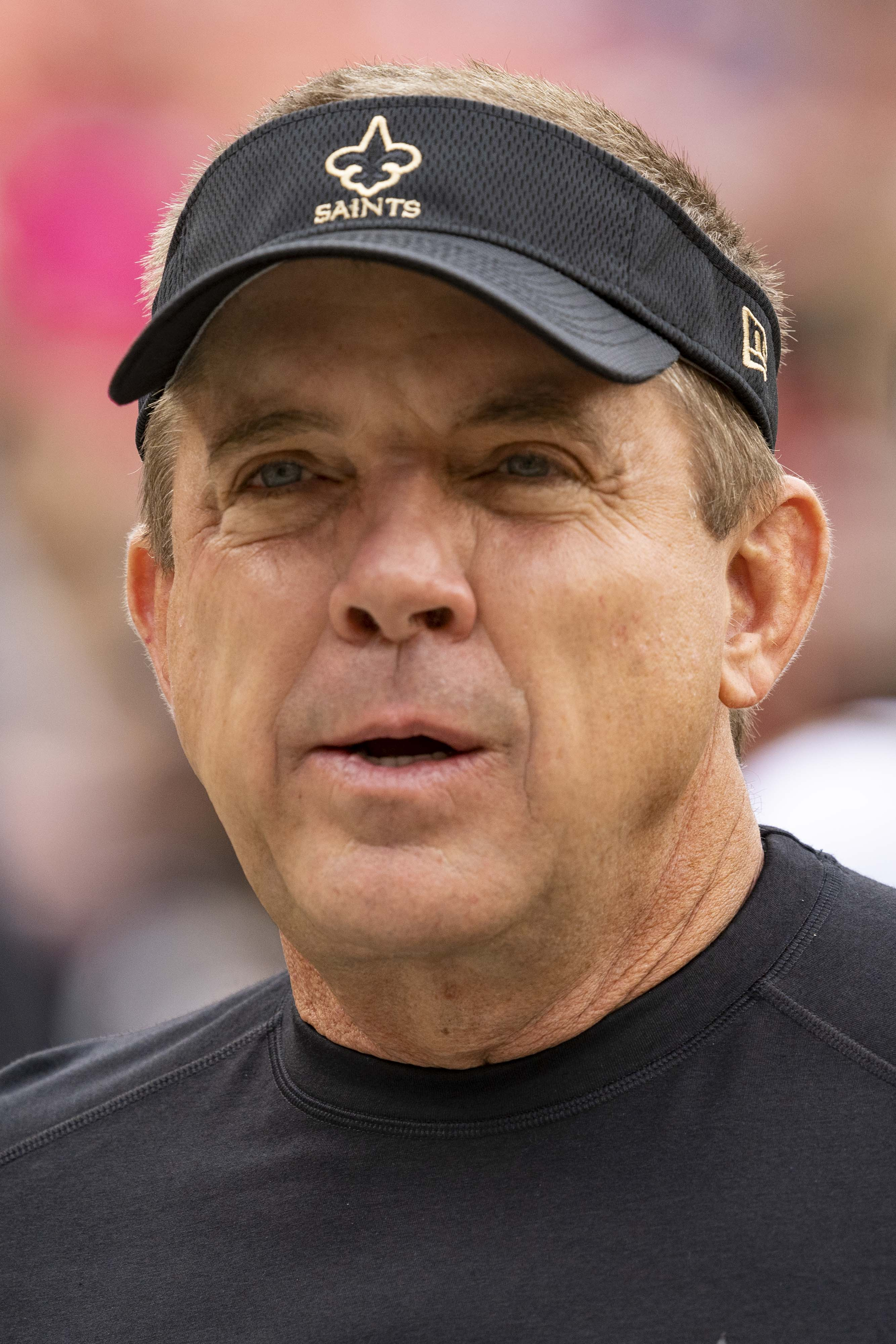
- Payton with the New Orleans Saints in 2021

Denver Broncos
- Title: Head coach

Personal information
- Born: December 29, 1963 (age 62); San Mateo, California, U.S.
- Listed height: 5 ft 11 in (1.80 m)
- Listed weight: 200 lb (91 kg)

Career information
- Position: Quarterback (No. 17)
- High school: Naperville Central (Naperville, Illinois)
- College: Eastern Illinois (1983–1986)
- NFL draft: 1987: undrafted

Career history

Playing
- Chicago Bruisers (1987); Pittsburgh Gladiators (1987); Ottawa Rough Riders (1987); Chicago Bears (1987); Leicester Panthers (1988)

Coaching
- San Diego State (1988–1989) Offensive assistant; Indiana State (1990–1991) Running backs & wide receivers coach; San Diego State (1992–1993) Running backs coach; Miami (OH) (1994–1995) Quarterbacks coach; Illinois (1996) Quarterbacks coach; Philadelphia Eagles (1997–1998) Quarterbacks coach; New York Giants (1999–2002); Quarterbacks coach (1999); Offensive coordinator (2000–2002); Dallas Cowboys (2003–2005) Assistant head coach & quarterbacks coach; New Orleans Saints (2006–2011, 2013–2021) Head coach; Liberty Christian (TX) (2012) (Note: While serving a season-long suspension with the Saints in 2012, Payton coached at Liberty) Offensive coordinator; Denver Broncos (2023–present) Head coach

Awards and highlights
- As a player: Eastern Illinois Panthers No. 18 retired; Eastern Illinois University Hall of Fame; As a coach: Super Bowl champion (XLIV); AP NFL Coach of the Year (2006); 2× Greasy Neale Award (2006, 2009)

Career NFL statistics
- Passing attempts: 23
- Passing completions: 8
- Completion percentage: 34.8%
- TD–INT: 0–1
- Passing yards: 79
- Passer rating: 27.3
- Rushing yards: 28
- Stats at Pro Football Reference

Career AFL statistics
- Passing attempts: 14
- Passing completions: 5
- Completion percentage: 35.7%
- TD–INT: 0–3
- Passing yards: 47
- Stats at ArenaFan.com

Head coaching record
- Regular season: 191–110 (.635)
- Postseason: 10–10 (.500)
- Career: 201–120 (.626)
- Coaching profile at Pro Football Reference

Patrick Sean Payton (born December 29, 1963) is an American professional football coach and former quarterback who is the head coach for the Denver Broncos of the National Football League (NFL). Previously, he served as the head coach of the New Orleans Saints from 2006 to 2021, leading the franchise to its first Super Bowl victory during the 2009 season. Payton played college football for the Eastern Illinois Panthers and played professionally in 1987 with the Chicago Bears and in 1988 overseas in Britain for the Leicester Panthers.

He began his coaching career as offensive assistant for San Diego State University and had several assistant coaching positions on college and NFL teams before being named as the tenth full-time coach in Saints history in 2006. Payton has always been known for his offensive prowess, having scored more points (2,804) and gained more yards (40,158) than any other team in a coach's first 100 games in NFL history. Payton had the second-longest NFL single-team tenure among active head coaches, behind New England Patriots head coach Bill Belichick, who coached the Patriots from 2000 to 2023.

Under Payton's leadership, the Saints made the 2006 NFL playoffs after a 3–13 season in 2005 and advanced to their first NFC Championship appearance in franchise history. Because of this effort, Payton won the AP NFL Coach of the Year Award. Following the 2009 season, the Saints won their first Super Bowl championship in franchise history. In 16 seasons with the Saints as head coach, Payton helped guide the team to three NFC Championship games (2006, 2009, and 2018), a victory in Super Bowl XLIV, and nine total playoff berths with seven division titles, making him the most successful coach in Saints franchise history.

In April 2012, Payton was suspended for the entire 2012 NFL season as a result of his involvement in the New Orleans Saints bounty scandal, under which "bounties" were paid for injuring players on opposing teams. Before the 2011 season began, an email sent by Michael Ornstein outlined a plan offering $5,000 to anyone who would injure Green Bay Packers quarterback Aaron Rodgers in the season opener, which Payton initially denied knowing about but later admitted to having read. Payton filed an appeal, but was denied, and was reinstated in January 2013.

== Early life ==
Payton was born in San Mateo, California, and raised in Naperville, Illinois, by parents Thomas and Jeanne Payton. Payton's parents were originally from Scranton, Pennsylvania; Thomas worked in the insurance industry. Payton lived in Newtown Square, Pennsylvania, during his grade school and middle school years (1970–1978). He attended Naperville Central High School in Naperville, Illinois, starting as quarterback his senior year before graduating in 1982. Earning a football scholarship, Payton had a successful career playing quarterback at Eastern Illinois University, leading the Panthers to an 11–2 record and the quarter-finals of the Division I-AA Playoffs in 1986. While attending EIU, he became a member of the Sigma Chi fraternity and was later named a Significant Sig; one of Sigma Chi's highest honors. Under coach Al Molde, Payton's Eastern Illinois teams were known as "Eastern Airlines" due to their prolific passing attack that frequently topped 300 yards per game (and had 509 passing yards in one game, still a school record).

== Playing career ==
Although he was not drafted in the 1987 NFL draft, Payton tried out for the Kansas City Chiefs for one day. In 1987, he played quarterback for the Chicago Bruisers and Pittsburgh Gladiators during the inaugural season of the Arena Football League, before his rights were sold for $1,000 to the Ottawa Rough Riders of the Canadian Football League. He was also a member of the Chicago Bears squad of strikebreaking replacement players, known as the "Spare Bears", during the 1987 NFL players strike. In 3 games he completed 8 of 23 passes (34.8%) for 79 yards, no touchdowns, an interception, and a passer rating of 27.3. He was also sacked 7 times for 47 yards and had one rush attempt for 28 yards. His one interception came against the New Orleans Saints, the team he would later go on to coach to a Super Bowl victory.

In 1988, he played for the Leicester Panthers of the professional UK Budweiser National League. Payton landed the starting quarterback role for the Panthers. Payton led the Panthers to a touchdown on their first possession, and an 8–5 regular season record. That same season saw the Panthers go to the Quarterfinals of the playoffs BAFA National Leagues, eventually losing to the London Olympians. Afterwards Payton returned to the US to take up a coaching position.

== Coaching career ==
=== Early coaching career ===
Payton began his coaching career in 1988 as an offensive assistant at San Diego State University. He made a series of assistant coaching positions at Indiana State University, Miami University (offensive coordinator), Illinois, and again at San Diego State (running backs coach), before landing a job as the quarterbacks coach with the Philadelphia Eagles in 1997.

He coached Marshall Faulk from 1992 to 1993 while working at San Diego State.

As OC at Miami University, he helped RB Deland McCullough run for over 1,100 yards. In 1995, the team scored the most points in a season (326) since 1986 and finished 8–2–1. RB Deland McCullough ran for over 1,600 yards with 14 TD and QB Sam Ricketts also threw 14 TD.

At the University of Illinois in 1996, he coached QB Scott Weaver, who completed 56% of his passes for over 1,700 yards and 7 TD.

=== Philadelphia Eagles (1997–1998) ===
From 1997 to 1998, Payton was quarterbacks coach for the Philadelphia Eagles and worked with offensive coordinator Jon Gruden and offensive line coach Bill Callahan. In 1998, Gruden and Callahan left for the Oakland Raiders, and Eagles head coach Ray Rhodes and Payton were fired. The Eagles' quarterbacks passed for 4,009 yards in 1997. Payton would not be retained by new head coach Andy Reid.

=== New York Giants (1999–2002) ===
In 1999, Payton was hired as the quarterbacks coach for the New York Giants and was promoted to the role of offensive coordinator in 2000. Under his guidance, the Giants would go on to represent the NFC in Super Bowl XXXV. During this time, he was known to lock himself in the stadium and sleep on the couches while studying plays during off-days.

At around 6:45 a.m. on September 11, 2001, the New York Giants' flight from Denver, where the Giants played the Denver Broncos for the first Monday Night Football game of 2001, landed at the gate of Newark Liberty International Airport next to United Airlines Flight 93, the flight that was hijacked and eventually crashed in rural Pennsylvania. Payton recalls this moment in his autobiography Home Team: Coaching the Saints and New Orleans Back to Life. During the 2002 season, after several poor showings by the Giants' offense, Payton's role in play-calling was taken over by then head coach Jim Fassel. Under Fassel the offense improved and propelled the team to a wild-card playoff berth.

=== Dallas Cowboys (2003–2005) ===
Payton joined Bill Parcells and the Dallas Cowboys as an assistant head coach and a quarterbacks coach in 2003. He guided three different quarterbacks (Quincy Carter, Vinny Testaverde, and Drew Bledsoe) to 3,000-yard passing seasons, while contributing to improve the passing offense from a 31st rank to 15th in the league. He also has been attributed as the primary factor for the team signing undrafted free agent Tony Romo in 2003.

In 2004, he became a sought-after assistant in the league, so the Cowboys gave him a pay raise to remain as their assistant head coach and quarterbacks coach. In 2005, he was promoted by Parcells to assistant head coach/passing game coordinator.

=== New Orleans Saints (2006–2011) ===
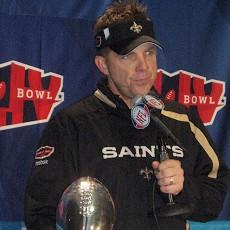
Payton with the Lombardi Trophy after the Saints victory in Super Bowl XLIV

Payton began his first head coaching assignment in 2006 with the New Orleans Saints. In the wake of Hurricane Katrina, during the 2005 season the Saints had finished with a 3–13 record, ranking as the second worst team in the league. However, Payton turned the struggling team around, and, with newly acquired free agent quarterback Drew Brees, led them to their first playoff appearance in six years. The team had one of the league's most productive offenses, ranking first in passing, and fifth in points scored. The Saints won the NFC South with a 10–6 record, earned a first-round playoff bye and notched only the second playoff win in franchise history, giving them a berth in the NFC Championship Game against the top-seeded Chicago Bears. The Saints out-gained the Bears in total yards on offense, but lost the game by the lopsided score of 39–14. Receiving 44 out of 50 votes from a panel of sports journalists and broadcasters, Payton won the AP NFL Coach of the Year Award in January 2007.

In the 2007 season, the Saints tried to improve upon their 10–6 record from the previous season. They and the Pittsburgh Steelers opened the NFL preseason, playing the Hall of Fame Game on August 5, 2007. The Saints were 3–2 in the preseason. The Saints also had the honor of opening the season against the defending champion Indianapolis Colts. The Saints finished the 2007 season 7–9. In 2008, the Saints finished with a 8–8 record and last in the NFC South that had the other three teams finish above .500.

In 2009, Payton coached the Saints to their most successful season with a 13–3 record. They won their playoff games and went to the Super Bowl. Payton decided to start the second half with a surprise onside kick, giving New Orleans possession. It's noted as one of the gutsiest plays in Super Bowl history. In the fourth quarter, Tracy Porter intercepted Peyton Manning during the fourth quarter and returned the pick for a touchdown, securing a 31–17 victory over the Indianapolis Colts in Super Bowl XLIV, the team's first Super Bowl win.

In June 2010, Payton published a book (written with journalist Ellis Henican) entitled Home Team: Coaching the Saints and New Orleans Back to Life. The book opened at number 8 on the non-fiction bestseller list of The New York Times. Payton described the concept of Home Team: "I didn't want to write another winning-on-the-field book or about modern-day leadership...I wanted to write a book about the stories, ones that you sit around and tell your friends." In the 2010 season, the Saints finished 11–5 and second in the division. They made the playoffs but their title defense ended in the Wild Card Round, a 41–36 loss to the Seahawks.

On October 16, 2011, while coaching against the Tampa Bay Buccaneers, Payton broke his tibia and tore his MCL in a collision with tight end Jimmy Graham's helmet after Graham was tackled on the sideline. Unable to stand on the sidelines, Payton coached from the booth during rehabilitation. In a memorable moment the week after, Payton was spotted eating a hot dog in a relaxed state while the Saints blew out the Indianapolis Colts 62–7. The Saints finished the season with a 13–3 record and won the NFC South. They defeated the Detroit Lions 45–28 in the Wild Card Round before falling to the San Francisco 49ers 36–32 in the Divisional Round.

==== Bounty scandal and suspension ====
On March 2, 2012, the NFL concluded after a thorough investigation that from 2009 to 2011, the Saints implemented a bounty program that rewarded players for deliberately attempting to knock opposing players out of games. The slush fund was determined to be administered by defensive coordinator Gregg Williams, who joined the team in 2009. An extensive league investigation found that Payton was implicated in the Bounty Scandal. The league determined Payton went as far as to orchestrate a cover-up when the league first investigated it in the 2009–10 offseason. When informed that the league was investigating reports of a bounty program, Payton met with Williams and assistant head coach Joe Vitt and told them, "Let's make sure our ducks are in a row."

According to a league memo, the NFL reopened its investigation late in the 2011 season. Just before the Saints' playoff game against the Detroit Lions, league officials alerted Saints owner Tom Benson that they had found irrefutable evidence of the Saints' bounty program. When general manager Mickey Loomis informed Payton that the league had reopened its investigation, Payton failed to shut the alleged program down.

On March 22, 2012, NFL Commissioner Roger Goodell suspended Payton for the entire 2012 season, effective April 1. Payton became the first head coach in modern NFL history to be suspended for any reason. Goodell was particularly upset that Payton and other Saints officials had lied to him about the scheme. For instance, during its investigation, the league uncovered an email that Michael Ornstein, the agent for former Saints running back Reggie Bush, had sent to Payton. In reality, the Ornstein email wasn't directly sent to Payton, instead it came to team spokesman Greg Bensel, who then forwarded it to the coaching staff with this message: "email from Orny (he asked that I send it) the dude is in prison so I told him I would." The email stated "put me down for $5,000 on Green Bay Packers quarterback Aaron Rodgers." "It's a running joke going for three years," Ornstein said. "Ornstein's email is just another example of the speciousness of the quote-unquote evidence that Commissioner (Roger) Goodell claims to have to support his erroneous accusations against Jonathan and the other players," lawyer Peter Ginsberg said. "As more of the evidence is revealed in the media, it is becoming more and more apparent how irresponsible the NFL's actions have been." When confronted with the email, Payton initially claimed he never read it, but subsequently admitted that he had. In an interview with ESPN's Adam Schefter, Goodell implied that Payton would have faced significant punishment even if he'd been more forthcoming. In Goodell's view, Payton's contractual obligation to supervise his assistants meant that, at the very least, he should have known about the scheme and shut it down immediately. In the league's announcement of sanctions against the Saints, Payton was faulted for violating a provision of the league constitution that requires coaches to inform their owners about team operations, as well as to "avoid actions that undermine or damage the club's reputation or operating success."

On March 30, 2012, Payton lodged a formal appeal of his suspension. Goodell held an expedited hearing on the matter and was expected to render a decision in "days, not weeks,". Payton also used the hearing as a chance to get clarification on the terms of his ban. Goodell turned the appeal down on April 9, meaning that Payton's suspension was set to begin on April 16. He was to remain suspended until the end of Super Bowl XLVII, which was held in New Orleans. According to ESPN's Chris Mortensen, Payton was to forfeit $7.8 million of his $8.1 million salary. He was barred from even casual contact with anyone in the NFL; any such contact would have to be reported to NFL executive Ray Anderson.

Soon after the suspension was announced, Payton began discussions with his mentor Bill Parcells about serving as an interim coach for the 2012 season.

In September 2011, the Saints and Payton agreed to extend Payton's contract through 2015. However, on November 4, 2012, the NFL revealed that it had disallowed the extension because it contained a clause the NFL deemed to violate its rules, which would have allowed Payton to leave if Saints general manager Mickey Loomis were not with the team. The NFL's action left Payton's contract status in doubt beyond the 2012 season, although Payton said that he intended to return to the Saints.

=== Liberty Christian Warriors (2012) ===
During his 2012 suspension from the NFL, Payton served as the offensive coordinator for his son Connor's sixth-grade team in Argyle, Texas. Payton used a simplified version of the Saints playbook, and the team went unbeaten until they suffered a loss near the end of the regular season to a team that ran the single-wing, which his team was unable to stop. Since he believed he would face that team again in the league's playoffs, he obtained video that the father of one of his players had recorded, and then contacted his mentor Bill Parcells to help him break down the opponent's offense. The teams indeed faced one another in the league finals; Payton's team lost a considerably closer game in which they were able to slow down the opposing offense.

In week 5 of the 2012 NFL season, Payton, along with Vitt and Loomis, were granted permission to attend the Saints game against the San Diego Chargers in order to witness Brees break Johnny Unitas' record for most consecutive games with a touchdown pass. Brees specifically requested for the three to be in attendance at the Superdome, despite their suspensions.

=== New Orleans Saints (2013–2021) ===
NFL Commissioner Roger Goodell reinstated Payton on January 22, 2013. Payton agreed to a new multi-year contract extension as head coach of the Saints, beginning in 2013. In the 2013 season, he led the team to a 11–5 record, good for second in the NFC South. After a 26–24 win over the Philadelphia Eagles in the Wild Card Round behind a game-winning Shayne Graham field goal, the Saints lost to the top-seeded and eventual Super Bowl XLVIII champion Seattle Seahawks 23–15 in the Divisional Round. Despite the loss to Seattle, of the Seahawks' three postseason opponents en route to their Super Bowl title, the Saints committed just one turnover against the vaunted Legion of Boom defense, compared to the San Francisco 49ers committing three in the NFC Championship Game and the Denver Broncos turning it over four times in the Super Bowl. New Orleans also gained the most amount of total yards on offense with 409, with San Francisco and Denver recording 308 and 306 yards respectively, and also the greatest number of passing yards with 301, compared to the 49ers managing 147 yards through the air and the Broncos with 279 passing yards.

The 2014 season saw the Saints finish with a 7–9 record and miss the postseason. Payton led the Saints to another 7–9 finish in the 2015 season. On January 6, 2016, he announced that he would stay with the Saints despite interest from other teams that had led to speculation that he would be traded.

Payton agreed to a new five-year contract extension as head coach of the Saints on March 23, 2016. On Christmas Eve 2016, Payton notched his 94th victory as Saints head coach, passing Jim E. Mora as the winningest coach in franchise history. In the 2016 season, the Saints went 7–9 for the third consecutive season.

The 2017 season saw the Saints achieve their first winning season since 2013, with an 11–5 record. In the Wild Card round, New Orleans defeated their division rival Carolina Panthers 31–26 to advance to the Divisional Round against the second-seeded Minnesota Vikings. Against the Vikings, after falling behind 17–0, the Saints were able to regain a 24–23 lead in the final minute of the fourth quarter. But on the last play of the game, Vikings quarterback Case Keenum threw a 27-yard pass to wide receiver Stefon Diggs, who evaded Saints safety Marcus Williams and ran to the end zone to complete a 61-yard touchdown pass as time expired to win the game for Minnesota, 29–24. This game was the first in NFL playoff history to end in a touchdown as time expired. The play would later be known as the Minneapolis Miracle.

In the 2018 season, the Saints attained the top-seed in the NFC after finishing with a 13–3 record. Upon eliminating the defending Super Bowl champion Philadelphia Eagles 20–14 in the Divisional Round, the team advanced to the NFC Championship Game against the Los Angeles Rams for the right to represent the conference in Super Bowl LIII. The game was marred with controversy after the referees missed a pass interference call of Rams cornerback Nickell Robey-Coleman's hit on Saints wide receiver Tommylee Lewis on 3rd-and-10 with 1:45 remaining in the fourth quarter. The Saints went on to lose 26–23 in overtime. Some fans, players, and analysts believe the missed call is among the worst in NFL history. The NFL admitted to missing the call soon after the game was over, but did not apologize for the situation until a week and a half later. They also did not overturn the result of the game. The fallout from the missed call was a factor in the NFL's decision to expand instant replay, making pass interference (including non-calls) reviewable. However, that ability to change PI calls did not last past the 2019 season.

On September 15, 2019, the Saints and Payton agreed to a five-year contract extension. The Saints once again finished 13–3 in 2019. However, they were upset in the Wild Card round of the playoffs by the Minnesota Vikings in overtime 26–20, a third consecutive disappointing playoff finish for the Saints.

Payton was fined US$100,000 by the NFL for not properly wearing a face mask, as required for coaches during the COVID-19 pandemic, during a week 2 game in the 2020 NFL season on September 22, 2020. In the 2020 season, Payton led the Saints to a 12–4 record and a NFC South title.

Following the 2021 NFL season, which saw the Saints go 9–8 and miss the postseason, and a year after his long-time quarterback, Drew Brees, retired from the NFL, Payton announced he would be stepping down as head coach after 16 years. Payton finished his tenure in New Orleans with an overall record of 161–97 and as the winningest coach in franchise history. On February 28, 2022, it was revealed that the Miami Dolphins had requested permission from the Saints to interview Payton for their vacant head coaching spot, but were reportedly denied permission and had scrapped the idea after their former head coach, Brian Flores, filed a lawsuit against the NFL over racial discrimination in hiring practices early that month. The Dolphins were considering pairing Payton with quarterback Tom Brady, who had briefly retired from the NFL from February 1, 2022, until March 13, 2022. On June 13, 2022, it was reported that the Dolphins offered Payton a five-year deal worth $100 million, a deal that would have made him the highest paid coach in NFL history, and would have been only the second $100 million deal signed by a head coach, after Jon Gruden's 10-year, $100 million contract to return to the Oakland Raiders in 2018. Six months after the pursuit was first reported, on August 2, 2022, the Dolphins and team owner Stephen M. Ross were fined $1.5 million and forfeited a 2023 first-round draft pick along with a 2024 third-round pick due to impermissible communication with both Payton and Tom Brady, who both share the same agent, Don Yee, between the 2019 and 2021 seasons. Ross also received a six-game suspension as a result and Dolphins vice chairman/limited partner Bruce Beal was fined $500,000 and received a year-long suspension for the 2022 season.

=== Initial retirement ===
Following the 2021 season, Payton announced his retirement from coaching in January 2022.

In January 2023, Payton interviewed for head coach vacancies with the Denver Broncos, Carolina Panthers, Arizona Cardinals, and Houston Texans.

=== Denver Broncos (2023–present) ===
On January 31, 2023, Payton reported that he had accepted the position of head coach for the Denver Broncos, and was officially hired three days later. In order to release Payton from his contract with the Saints, the Broncos agreed to trade a 2023 first-round pick and a 2024 second-round pick to the Saints in exchange for Payton and a 2024 third-round pick. The 2023 season ended on a controversial note after two straight losses to the Detroit Lions and New England Patriots, quarterback Russell Wilson was benched in favor of Jarrett Stidham for the final two games of the season to "preserve financial flexibility". The team finished with an 8–9 record and missed the postseason.

In Week 7 of the 2024 season, Payton and the Broncos played against the Saints in a Thursday Night Football game. After the Broncos defeated the Saints 33–10, Payton became just the eighth head coach in NFL history to defeat all 32 teams in the league. In Week 18, the Broncos, with Payton as the head coach, clinched their first playoff berth since the 2015 season after defeating the Kansas City Chiefs 38–0. It was also the team's first winning season since 2016. In the Wild Card round, the Broncos lost to the Buffalo Bills 31–7.

In his third season with the Broncos, the team won 11 straight games after starting the season 1–2 and won the division with one game to spare after the Los Angeles Chargers lost to the Houston Texans, giving Denver their first AFC West title since 2015. In a rematch of the previous season's Wild Card round, the Broncos then defeated the Buffalo Bills 33–30 in overtime in the Divisional Round to give the Broncos their first playoff win since Super Bowl 50 a decade earlier. However, after second-year quarterback Bo Nix would be ruled out for the AFC Championship Game against the New England Patriots with a broken ankle he had suffered late against Buffalo, the Broncos lost 10–7 to New England, ending their season. Payton faced criticism for his decision to go for it on a 4th-and-1 at the Patriots’ 14 yard line in the second quarter, rather than electing to kick a 32-yard field goal, in the eventual three-point loss.

On February 24, 2026, Payton announced that he would be handing over offensive play calling duties to offensive coordinator Davis Webb, marking the first time in Payton's career as a head coach that he would not be calling plays. On June 11, Payton signed a five-year contract extension with the Broncos. However, after a poor start offensively to the 2026 season where they ranked in the bottom ten in both yards and points scored, Payton took playcalling back from Webb.

== Head coaching record ==
| Team | Year | Regular season | | | | | Postseason | | | |
| Team | Year | Won | Lost | Ties | Win % | Finish | Won | Lost | Win % | Result |
|---|---|---|---|---|---|---|---|---|---|---|
| NO | 2006 | 10 | 6 | 0 | .625 | 1st in NFC South | 1 | 1 | .500 | Lost to Chicago Bears in NFC Championship Game |
| NO | 2007 | 7 | 9 | 0 | .438 | 3rd in NFC South | — | — | — | — |
| NO | 2008 | 8 | 8 | 0 | .500 | 4th in NFC South | — | — | — | — |
| NO | 2009 | 13 | 3 | 0 | .813 | 1st in NFC South | 3 | 0 | 1.000 | Super Bowl XLIV Champions |
| NO | 2010 | 11 | 5 | 0 | .688 | 2nd in NFC South | 0 | 1 | .000 | Lost to Seattle Seahawks in NFC Wild Card Game |
| NO | 2011 | 13 | 3 | 0 | .813 | 1st in NFC South | 1 | 1 | .500 | Lost to San Francisco 49ers in NFC Divisional Game |
| NO | 2012 | suspended for bounty scandal | | | | | | | | |
| NO | 2013 | 11 | 5 | 0 | .688 | 2nd in NFC South | 1 | 1 | .500 | Lost to Seattle Seahawks in NFC Divisional Game |
| NO | 2014 | 7 | 9 | 0 | .438 | 2nd in NFC South | — | — | — | — |
| NO | 2015 | 7 | 9 | 0 | .438 | 3rd in NFC South | — | — | — | — |
| NO | 2016 | 7 | 9 | 0 | .438 | 3rd in NFC South | — | — | — | — |
| NO | 2017 | 11 | 5 | 0 | .688 | 1st in NFC South | 1 | 1 | .500 | Lost to Minnesota Vikings in NFC Divisional Game |
| NO | 2018 | 13 | 3 | 0 | .813 | 1st in NFC South | 1 | 1 | .500 | Lost to Los Angeles Rams in NFC Championship Game |
| NO | 2019 | 13 | 3 | 0 | .813 | 1st in NFC South | 0 | 1 | .000 | Lost to Minnesota Vikings in NFC Wild Card Game |
| NO | 2020 | 12 | 4 | 0 | .750 | 1st in NFC South | 1 | 1 | .500 | Lost to Tampa Bay Buccaneers in NFC Divisional Game |
| NO | 2021 | 9 | 8 | 0 | .529 | 2nd in NFC South | — | — | — | — |
| NO total | | 152 | 89 | 0 | .631 | | 9 | 8 | .529 | |
| DEN | 2023 | 8 | 9 | 0 | .471 | 3rd in AFC West | — | — | — | — |
| DEN | 2024 | 10 | 7 | 0 | .588 | 3rd in AFC West | 0 | 1 | .000 | Lost to Buffalo Bills in AFC Wild Card Game |
| DEN | 2025 | 14 | 3 | 0 | .824 | 1st in AFC West | 1 | 1 | .500 | Lost to New England Patriots in AFC Championship Game |
| DEN | 2026 | 7 | 2 | 0 | .778 | | | | | |
| DEN total | | 39 | 21 | 0 | .650 | | 1 | 2 | .333 | |
| Total | | 191 | 110 | 0 | .635 | | 10 | 10 | .500 | |

== Coaching tree ==
Payton has worked under eight head coaches:

- Denny Stolz, San Diego State (1988)
- Al Luginbill, San Diego State (1989, 1992–1993)
- Dennis Raetz, Indiana State (1990–1991)
- Randy Walker, Miami (OH) (1994–1995)
- Lou Tepper, Illinois (1996)
- Ray Rhodes, Philadelphia Eagles (1997–1998)
- Jim Fassel, New York Giants (1999–2002)
- Bill Parcells, Dallas Cowboys (2003–2005)

Fourteen of Payton's assistant coaches became head coaches in the NFL or NCAA:

- Doug Marrone, Syracuse (2009–2012), Buffalo Bills (2013–2014), Jacksonville Jaguars (2016, interim, 2017–2020)
- Curtis Johnson, Tulane (2012–2015)
- Dennis Allen, Oakland Raiders (2012–2014), New Orleans Saints (2022–2024)
- Aaron Kromer, New Orleans Saints (2012, interim)
- Joe Vitt, New Orleans Saints (2012, interim)
- Marc Trestman, Chicago Bears (2013–2014)
- Ed Orgeron, USC (2013, interim), LSU (2016–2021)
- John Bonamego, Central Michigan (2015–2018)
- Mike Neu, Ball State (2016–2024)
- Steve Spagnuolo, New York Giants (2017, interim)
- Gregg Williams, Cleveland Browns (2018, interim)
- Dan Campbell, Detroit Lions (2021–present)
- Aaron Glenn, New York Jets (2025–present)
- Joe Brady, Buffalo Bills (2026–present)

Three of Payton's executives became general managers in the NFL:

- Ryan Pace, Chicago Bears (2015–2021)
- Terry Fontenot, Atlanta Falcons (2021–2025)
- Darren Mougey, New York Jets (2025–present)

== Broadcasting career ==
After stepping down as head coach of the Saints, Payton joined Fox to work in studio throughout 2022, becoming a part of the Fox NFL Sunday panel as a fill-in for Jimmy Johnson's off days. Payton was also in talks to join Amazon's NFL coverage before accepting the role.

== Personal life ==
Payton met Beth Shuey, an Indiana State University graduate, while coaching there. The couple have two children, daughter Meghan (born 1997) and son Connor (born 2000). Payton is an American of Irish Catholic descent. Payton and his family moved to a home in Mandeville, Louisiana when he became the Saints' head coach.

In June 2012, Payton and his wife Beth filed for divorce.

In 2014, after his suspension and the finalization of his divorce, he moved from the New Orleans suburbs where he had kept his in-season home to Uptown New Orleans, buying a condo in that neighborhood.

On November 10, 2019, at the end of the Saints vs. Falcons game, it was announced that Payton had gotten engaged two days prior on November 8 to his girlfriend, Skylene Montgomery. They married in a private ceremony on June 18, 2021, in Cabo San Lucas, Mexico. The wedding was officiated by former NBA player and coach Avery Johnson.

On March 19, 2020, it was reported that Payton had tested positive for COVID-19. Payton became the first confirmed case of COVID-19 in the NFL.

== Honors and awards ==
- National Football League Coach of the Year Award—AP, SN, PFW, Maxwell (2006)
- Kansas City Committee of 101 NFC Coach of the Year (2006, 2009)
- ESPY Awards Outstanding Team—New Orleans Saints (2010)
- NCAA Silver Anniversary Awards (2012)

== Selected works ==
- Payton, Sean (2010), Home Team: Coaching the Saints and New Orleans Back to Life, New York: New American Library, ISBN 978-0-451-23261-8

== In popular culture ==
- Payton is played by Kevin James in the 2022 film Home Team, a comedy based around Payton's suspension after the 2012 Bounty Scandal. He also made a cameo appearance in the film.
