= Morecambe Bay Storm =

Former American football team based in the United Kingdom

- Founded: 2011 as Walney; 2016 as Morecambe
- League: BAFA National Leagues
- Team history: Walney Terriers (2011–2017); Furness Phantoms (2017–2021); Morecambe Bay Storm (2016–2022)
- Location: Barrow-In-Furness; Ulverston, Cumbria; Morecambe, Lancashire
- Colours: Terriers (Green & Gold); Phantoms (Black & Green); Storm (Silver, Blue & Black)
- Playoff berths: 2017 (Morecambe), 2018 (Furness)

The Morecambe Bay Storm were the final operating name of an American football club that were based in Morecambe, Lancashire who played in the BAFA National Leagues. The club traces its roots back to 2011 when the Walney Terriers joined the BAFANL. In 2016 Morecambe Bay formed as a separate club in the same regional division, while the Terriers became the Furness Phantoms in 2017. Due to the COVID-19 pandemic, the Phantoms dropped out of the 2021 season before announcing a merger with The Storm in time for the 2022 season, however several months later the merged team also folded. The Storm and the Phantoms had both been divisional rivals until the merger.

== History ==
=== Walney and rebrand to Furness ===
Logo of the Walney Terriers

Established in 2011 they were elevated to full BAFA member status in 2013. They are one of two BAFANL teams in Cumbria and Lancashire, playing in a conference of the league's second tier (National North West) alongside the Chester Romans, Crewe Railroaders, Halton Spartans & Leeds Bobcats. The Terriers originally trained and played at Memorial Fields on Walney Island. They then moved to Hawcoat Park and now have moved to GSK Sports & Social Club, Ulverston and still occasionally use Barrow Raiders' Craven Park stadium.

In 2017 the team rebranded to the Furness Phantoms. In 2021, the Phantoms ceased operating and announced they had merged with the Storm.

=== Morecambe Bay Storm ===
Morecambe entered the League in 2017, in their first season operating they made the Division 2 Play-offs where they were beaten by the Shropshire Revolution.

The club announced they had folded just prior to the 2022 BAFANL season, only several months after they had absorbed the Phantoms into their organisation.
