= Sheffield Giants =

American Football team based in the United Kingdom

- Founded: 2008; 18 years ago (as Sheffield Predators)
- League: BAFA National Leagues
- Division: NFC 1 South
- Team history: Sheffield Predators (2008–2016); Sheffied Giants (2016–)
- Location: Sheffield, South Yorkshire
- Stadium: Norton Sports Park
- Colours: Black Helmets; Sky Blue Jerseys; Black Pants
- Head coach: Matt Flynn
- Manager: Zoe McCallum (Team Manager)
- Division titles: 1: 2012
- Playoff berths: 2: 2012, 2013
- Website: www.sheffieldgiants.com

The Sheffield Giants are an American football team based in Sheffield, South Yorkshire, England, that competes in the BAFA National Leagues NFC 1 South, the premier level of British American football. They were formed in 2008 as the Sheffield Predators but re-branded to the Giants in 2016 in a nod to the Steel City Giants who folded in the 1980s. In 2012 they were crowned Division Two Bowl Champions after defeating the Peterborough Saxons at the Don Valley Stadium.

== History ==
There have been a number of teams in and around the Sheffield area since the inception of American football in Britain. The Steel City Giants were formed in the 1980s but soon folded in the same era. Until 2008, The Sheffield Tomahawks junior side were the only operating club in the City before The Predators were formed and after finishing their associate period, entered the BAFANL in 2010. The Predators first season in Britball ended with a 0-10 record and finishing bottom of the National Central 2.

During this time they have achieved a degree of success, primarily running the double-wing formation, beating the Peterborough Saxons 39-33 in overtime to take home the Division 2 National Championship in 2012 at the Don Valley Stadium in their home town.

In 2014, the Predators announced a partnership with Structure Sport and Fitness Ltd, a gym in Sheffield, worth over £4000 annually.

In 2016, the club was rebranded as the Sheffield Giants after an online voting poll by supporters and the British American Football. The name change came following the teams decision to boost the appeal of the club, citing that the name "The Predators" was a negative name for attracting players from schools and universities

== Logos and uniforms ==
The Predators logo was a stylised lion, the team played in gold jerseys with a black trim, and black game pants. The Giants rebrand in 2017 incorporated a full kit rebrand to black helmet, sky blue jerseys and black pants.

== Home field ==
The Sheffield Giants play their home games at the Sport Sheffield Norton Sports Park complex on Warminster Road in Sheffield. The University of Sheffield American Football Team also play their home games at Norton.

== Youth team ==
As well as the adult contact team, the Sheffield Giants also operate both flag football and youth contact teams, the latter is known as the 'Sheffield Giants Academy'.

The Academy began in 2018 with a U16 contact team and has now grown to over 100 players at ages 7 to 19. They are currently recruiting for the non-contact U11, U14 and U17 'flag' teams, along with the U16 and U19 contact teams. All youth teams are inclusive and are mixed gender.

There are two Sheffield Giants flag football teams, a Women's team and a mixed team.

== Team records ==
Complete records for the club under all three identities. 1986 to 1989 as Steel City Giants, 2010 to 2016 as Sheffield Predators and 2016 to present day for Sheffield Giants .

Year	Division	Wins	Losses	Ties	Percentage
1986 UKAFL	AFC East	8	2	0	0.800
1987 Budweiser League	Southern	0	10	0	0.000
1988 Budweiser League	Premier Division	9	1	0	0.900
2010 BAFL	Division 2 Central	0	10	0	0.000
2011 BAFANL	Division 2 Central	6	4	0	0.600
2012 BAFANL	Division 2 Central	10	0	0	1.000
2013 BAFANL	Premier North	8	3	0	0.800
2014 BAFANL	Premier North	4	5	0	0.444
2015 BAFANL	Premier North	3	7	0	0.300
2016 BAFANL	Premier North	3	7	0	0.300
2017 BAFANL	Premier North	4	6	0	0.400
2018 BAFANL	Premier North	4	6	0	0.400
2019 BAFANL	Premier North	2	7	1	0.250
2020 BAFANL	Premier North	0	0	0	0.000^
2021 BAFANL	White Rose	6	1	0	0.857^^
2022 BAFANL	Premier North	3	7	0	0.300
2023 BAFANL	NFC 1 South	5	5	0	0.500
2024 BAFANL	NFC 1 North	4	4	0	0.500

^No season due to COVID-19 pandemic

^^One-off restructured division as part of 'return to play' during COVID-19 pandemic

== Honours ==
- Premier - Northern Conference Winners - 1988 (as Steel City Giants)
- BAFA Division Two Central - Divisional Champions - 2012 (as Sheffield Predators)
- BAFA Division Two - National Conference Champions - 2012 (as Sheffield Predators)
