= Shropshire Revolution =

American Football team based in the United Kingdom

- Founded: 2006; 20 years ago
- League: BAFA National Leagues
- Division: NFC 1 Midlands
- Location: Telford, Shropshire
- Stadium: Telford Athletics Stadium
- Colours: White Helmets, White & Purple Jerseys, Purple Pants
- Head coach: Alasdair Jarvis
- General manager: Daniel Hulme
- Division titles: 2: 2017, 2023
- Playoff berths: 9: 2010, 2011, 2014, 2016, 2017, 2019, 2023, 2024
- Website: shropshirerevolution.com

The Shropshire Revolution is an American football team based in Telford, Shropshire, England, who compete in the BAFA National Leagues NFC 1 South, the second level of British American Football. The club is based at the Telford Athletics Stadium, part of the Oakengates Leisure complex. They were formed in 2006 and debuted and were granted Associate membership shortly afterwards before debuting in the League in 2007.

The club were the 2017 NFC 2 South champions. They went undefeated with a 13–0 record before beating the Glasgow Tigers in the Division Two Bowl to earn promotion to Division 1. The club are also an eight-time Play-off qualifier.

== History ==
The Shropshire Revolution American Football team were formed in January 2006 by like-minded enthusiasts and fans of the game, via a forum on the website of NFLUK. Seven players met for the first session in the Town Park Bowl on Saturday 21 January 2006, when the following week a management team was formed. Initial discussions were along the lines of Flag Football until the team were ready to think about entering an application for kitted league football.

Media interest from BBC Local Television, BBC Radio Shropshire, the Shropshire Star newspaper, and Beacon Radio swelled the numbers of those interested in viewing and participating in the game considerably over the following weeks and a competition, run on Beacon Radio to choose the team name from a shortlist, declared that the team shall be known as the 'Shropshire Revolution' . The management team worked towards becoming an Associate Member of the British American Football League. This application was successful and the team was granted associate membership on 2 July 2006. The team's first game took place on 1 October 2006. In front of around 200 people, the Revolution beat the Lincolnshire Bombers 30–6. This was followed on 15 October by the team's first away game against the Leicester Falcons, which the Revolution won 28–14. A home game against the Leicester Falcons on 28 October saw the Revolution with a 29–0 victory.

On 1 November the league confirmed that the Revolutions application for league membership for the 2007 season, had been successful. The Shropshire Revolution cheerleader squad are called the Revolution Royals.

The club were the 2017 NFC 2 South champions. They went undefeated with a 13–0 record before beating the Glasgow Tigers in the Division Two Bowl to earn promotion to Division 1. The club are also eight-time Play-off qualifier.

== Stadium ==
Revolution home games take place at Telford Athletics Stadium. Oakengates Leisure Centre, New Road, Wrockwardine Wood, Telford, TF2 7AB.

== Seasonal records ==
2007 Division 2 Record (2–8–0)
2008 Division 2 Record (5–5–0)
2009 Division 2 Record (5–4–1)
2010 Division 2 Record (7–3–0)
2011 Division 2 Record (8–2)
2012 Division 1 Record (1–8–1)
2013 Division 2 Record (7–3)
2014 Division 2 Record (6–2–2)
2015 Division 1 Record (0–10–0)
2016 Division 2 Record (6–4–0)
2017 Division 2 Record (10–0)
2018 Division 1 Record (6–4)
2019 Division 1 Record (6–4)
2021 COVID-19 Regional Record (4–2–1)
2022 Division 1 Record (0–10)
2023 Division 2 Record (10–1)
2024 Division 1 Record (5–3)

== See also ==
Previous American Football teams in Shropshire:

- Wrekin Giants (1985–1989)
- Shropshire Giants (1989)
- Cannock Chase Giants (1989-1993/4)
