= Yorkshire Rams =

American Football team based in the United Kingdom

- Founded: 1986; 40 years ago
- League: BAFA National Leagues
- Division: NFC 1 North
- Location: Leeds, West Yorkshire
- Stadium: South Leeds Stadium
- Colours: Black Helmets; Black Jerseys; Black Pants
- Head coach: Dorian Deiwiks
- General manager: Stewart 'Pid' Hegarty

The Yorkshire Academy Rams (previously known as the Wakefield Wasps and Yorkshire Rams) are an English American football club, based in Leeds, West Yorkshire. They are currently playing in BAFANL NFC 1 North.

== History ==
The team was initially known as the Wakefield Wasps in 1986, renaming to the Rams in 1987. They were initially headquartered in Huddersfield before relocating to Wakefield, then to Dewsbury, then finally to Leeds in 2007. The team gained widespread recognition when Sky Sports ran an advertisement featuring Rams players on 1 January 2005.

The initial roster of the Rams was about 90 players at their first practice session, which reduced down to 60 by the time they played their first game. Their first game was against the Heanor Hawks from Waterloo, which they defeated 26–24. The Yorkshire Rams were one of the founding teams of the British American Football League in 1987.
