= Chester Romans =

American football team based in England

- Founded: 1986; 39 years ago
- League: BAFA National Leagues
- Division: NFC 1 South
- Location: Chester, Cheshire
- Stadium: Cheshire County Sports Club
- Colours: White Helmets; Red and White Jerseys; White Pants
- Head coach: David Pawson
- General manager: Anthony Clayton
- Division titles: 5: (1994, 1996, 1999, 2013, 2018)
- Playoff berths: 9: (1994, 1996, 1999, 2006, 2013, 2016, 2018, 2022, 2023)

Chester Romans
Current uniform
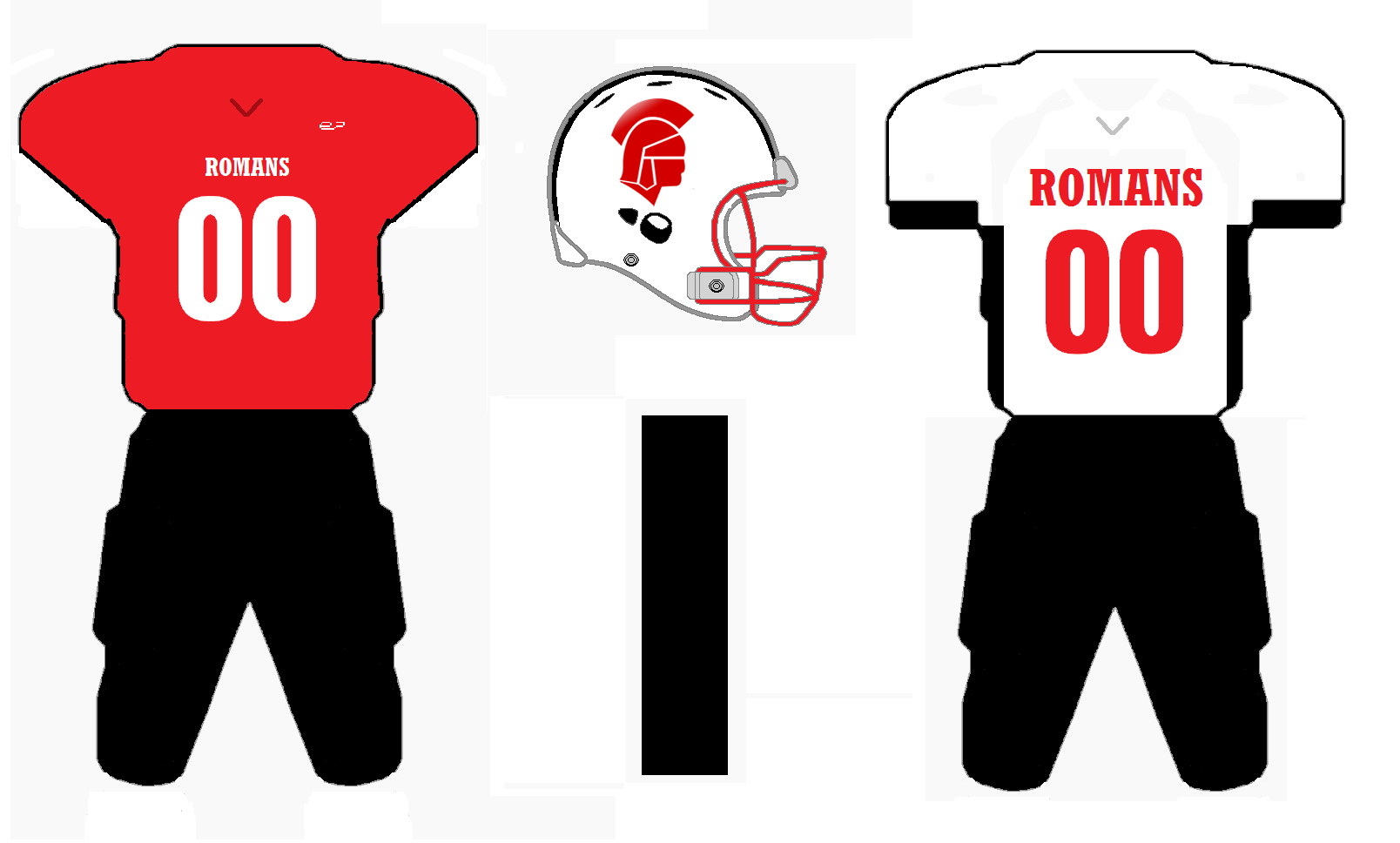

The Chester Romans are an American football team based in Chester, Cheshire, England, who compete in the BAFA National Leagues NFC 1 South, the second level of British American football. The club operate from Cheshire County Sports Club and were formed in 1986, making them one of the oldest surviving teams in the UK. They are five-time Divisional champions and operate an affiliated youth team called the Flintshire Romans for ages from 8 to 19.

== History ==
The Romans were founded during the week of Super Bowl XX at the Handbridge College, and played their first game of full kitted football in September of that year, beating the Rotherham Redskins 38-25.

They spent their formative years in the Budweiser League, but did not achieve much success and in the late 1980s, moved to the British National Gridiron League, where they made their first play off appearance in 1989 and made them again in 1994.

In the 1995 and 1996 seasons, the Romans relocated to Wrexham, Wales, achieving mixed success. In 2001, they changed their to the Cheshire Romans, before reverting to the Chester Romans in 2002.

In 1999, The Chester Romans defeated the Tiger Bay Warriors at Saffron Lane to become Division II Champions.

In 2014, former NFL player and Sky Sports pundit Cecil Martin held a training session with the Romans. 2015 saw a league realignment, and the Romans were placed in the Division 1 NFC South division, where they lost their opening game to the Nottingham Caesars 28-23.

The Romans were placed in NFC2 for 2018 alongside the Halton Spartans, Morecambe Bay Storm, Carlisle Sentinels and Furness Phantoms. The opening game of the season saw the Romans greet geographical rivals, the Halton Spartans to the CCSC, with the Romans winning 30-0. This was followed by a 0-1 win via forfeit as the Carlisle Sentinels withdrew for safety reasons. The reverse fixture saw the Romans win 41-0. The Romans marched to a 77-0 victory at home to the Morecambe Bay Storm, and a 46-18 victory of the Furness Phantoms. The Romans visited the Select Security Stadium to play the much improved Spartans, which ended in a disappointing 6-6 tie. The final two games seen the Romans close out their regular season with a 0-44, and 12-30 victories of the Furness Phantoms and Morecambe Bay Storm, respectively. The successful regular season placed Chester as the #2 seed in the playoffs.

Chester began the post-season stage at home to the Lincolnshire Bombers, which ended in a dominant 47-6 victory. This, then saw the Romans greet the Staffordshire Surge. The Romans booked their place in the NFC 2 final with victory.

== Logos and uniforms ==
Up until the end of 2018 the Romans played in a Red jersey. However with the start of the 2019 season they started to wear their new kit which is a White Jersey. They continue their main sponsorship partnership with Hickory's Smokehouse, Chester.

== Home field ==
The Cheshire County Sports Club is a multi-use sports facility in Chester. There are both grass and artificial turf pitches for use in a variety of sports. The facilities serve over 5000 visitors each year.

== Season results ==
| Season | Division | Wins | Losses | Ties | Divisional Position | Playoff Run |
|---|---|---|---|---|---|---|
| 2016 | NFC 2 | 9 | 1 | 0 | 2nd | Semifinalists |
| 2017 | NFC 2 | 8 | 2 | 0 | 2nd | Quarterfinalists |
| 2018 | NFC 2 | 7 | 0 | 1 | 1st | Finalists |
| 2019 | NFC 1 | 3 | 7 | 0 | 5th | |
