= Leicester Panthers =

American football team based in the United Kingdom

- League: BAFA National Leagues
- Division: NFC 1 Midlands
- Team history: Leicester Panthers (1983–1996); Leicester Falcons (2006–2023); Leicester Panthers (2023–)
- Location: Leicester, Leicestershire
- Stadium: Leicester Forest East RFC
- Managing director: Richard "Sweede" Swain
- Head coach: Dean Holmes
- Division titles: 4: 2009, 2016, 2017, 2018
- Playoff berths: 8: 2009, 2010, 2011, 2015, 2016, 2017, 2018, 2022

The Leicester Panthers are an American football team based in Leicester, England, that competes in the BAFA National Leagues Premier Division North, the top level of British American football. Their current home ground is at Leicester Forest Rugby Club., having previously played at De Montfort Park and Leicester Forest RFC.

== History ==
The original Leicester Panthers team were formed in 1983 and disbanded in 1996, and played home games at Saffron Lane sports centre. In the time they played, they recorded only one losing season, and won the league final in 1996, the year they dissolved the team. The club can boast Denver Broncos head coach Sean Payton as their most famous alumnus, as he was the starting quarterback in the 1988 season.

A number of original players from the Leicester Panthers, including rugby star Martin Johnson, who had played for the team in the early 1990s, Barry Driver, Charles Thompson and Neil Eastoll, reformed in 2007 to play a charity match against the Loughborough Aces for the Matt Hampson Trust; the Panthers won 20–3.

Following the dissolution of the Leicester Panthers, there was no American football team until the debut of the formation of the Leicester Falcons in 2008. In the 2009 season playoffs, the Falcons beat Manchester Titans and Glasgow Tigers to reach their first championship game. They won the BAFA Division 2 Championship in 2009, defeating the Colchester Gladiators 33-32.

The 2015 season saw the return of Guy Kersey and Head Coach Lester Hopewell, as well as a move to a new home ground, Leicester Road Stadium at De Montfort Park, Hinckley. The Falcons qualified for the playoffs with a 7–3–0 regular season record, before succumbing to a 21–6 defeat to the Sandwell Steelers.

In April 2023, following the departure of general manager Guy Kersey, the Falcons rebranded as the Panthers. In September 2024 the Panthers launched the Leicester Panthers Academy. A merger between the Leicester Falcons, Leicester Huntsman and Rugby Rhinos created the Leicester Panthers American Football Academy, with six teams: U11 Flag Football U14 Flag Football U17 Flag Football U16 Contact Football U19 Contact Football NWFL Womens Contact Football.

The Academy was formed and run by President Ian Barnsby alongside Academy Secretary Ben Goodman.

In 2025 the Academy spent time with the Denver Broncos and became official partners with the Broncos under the All In All Covered programme.
