= Crewe Railroaders =

American football team based in England

Logo

General information
- Founded: 1984; 42 years ago
- Headquartered: Crewe

Personnel
- Head coach: Simon Richards

Nickname
- Railroaders

League / conference affiliations
- BAFA National Leagues; NFC 2 West

Championships
- Division championships: 0; 1988 BNGL Midlands Div 1985 UKAFA Central Div

Current uniform

Home

The Crewe Railroaders are an American football team based in Crewe, Cheshire, England, founded in 1984. They play in NFC 2 West of the BAFA National Leagues. The team resumed playing competitive games in 2012, having reformed in 2010 after folding in 1990.

== History ==
The Crewe Railroaders were formed in November 1984 by Gary Delaney. The team competed with the Hereford Chargers and took part in the first season of American Football in Great Britain. The Railroaders were crowned inaugural Central Division Champions with a record of 5–2–1.

The team was renamed to Railroaders '89 under Kevin Randle. They won the 1989 season with a 5-4-1 record. 1990 was the Railroaders final season. The team lost with a record of 3–7–0.

The team collapsed in 1993 and later re-formed in 2010. The team had around 200 registered members before it folded.

In 2010, former Railroaders got together and agreed that Crewe needed an American Football team again. These veterans were quickly joined by some newer players after a recruitment drive and a "rookie day" were held. At the start of 2015 the club welcomed over 40 players for their first training session of the year.

The team is the subject of a film called Gridiron UK, the screenplay of which was written by team founder, coach and player Gary Delaney. The film premiered in September 2016.

In 2021 the team lost all games they played and in 2023 the team finished 0–8 in the NFC 2West division. The club dropped to associate status in March 2024
