= Denis Martin Cowley =

British barrister and judge

- Born: 30 January 1919; Belfast, Northern Ireland, United Kingdom
- Died: 28 June 1985 (aged 66); Castletown, Isle of Man
- Occupations: barrister and judge
- Spouse: Margaret Hazel Teare (m. 1940)
- Children: 1 son, 2 daughters
- Father: Sir William Percy Cowley CBE

Denis Martin Cowley QC (30 January 1919 – 28 June 1985) was a British barrister and judge.

== Biography ==
Cowley was born in Belfast, a son of Sir William Percy Cowley CBE, also a Liberal and a Deemster on the Isle of Man. He was educated at Radley College and Exeter College, Oxford where he received a Master of Arts (Hons Jurisprudence). In 1940 he married Margaret Hazel Teare, of Ramsey, Isle of Man. They had one son and two daughters.

Cowley served during the war as a Sergeant and then a Flight Lieutenant in the Royal Air Force Volunteer Reserve from 1939–45. His spitfire was shot down over the English Channel and he was taken prisoner. He was a prisoner of war in Germany from 1941 to 1944. While a prisoner he studied law. He made numerous attempts to escape and succeeded in reaching Switzerland where he was held by the authorities. He made a further escape to France, where the French Resistance helped him to link up with the Allied Forces.

Cowley was called to the bar by the Inner Temple in 1946. He based himself in Nottingham and practised on the Midland Circuit. In 1965 he became a Queen's Counsel. In 1969 he became Deputy Senior Judge on the Midland and Oxford Circuit. In 1972 he became a Bencher. In 1973 he successfully acted for the Douglas Corporation at the Summerland fire disaster inquiry. In 1974 he became a Recorder of the Crown Court. In 1979 he was leading counsel for John Le Mesurier in Thorpe affair trial at the Old Bailey. During the trial, Cowley advised Le Mesurier that his best chance of acquittal was by giving evidence that could harm the other defendants, including Jeremy Thorpe. However, Le Measurier chose not to and was acquitted along with the other defendants. In 1982 he became Senior Judge in the Sovereign Base Areas, Cyprus. In 1984 he was appointed to the Mental Health Appeal Tribunal.

In August 1949 Cowley was chosen as Liberal candidate for the Brigg division of Lincolnshire and contested the 1950 General Election, standing against Lance Mallalieu, a former Liberal MP who held the seat for the Labour Party. The Liberal Party did not have much of a track record in the constituency and did not even contest the 1948 Brigg by-election. He finished third, though he did manage to save his deposit. He did not stand for parliament again.

In 1985 he died in Castletown, Isle of Man at the age of 66.

== Electoral results ==
General Election 23 February 1950:Brigg
Party	Candidate	Votes	%	±%
Labour	Edward Lancelot Mallalieu	28,934	52.7	−1.9
Conservative	M. F. Staniland	18,521	33.7	−11.7
Liberal	Denis Martin Cowley	7,438	13.6	n/a
Majority		10,413	19.0	
Turnout			85.7	+8.6
Labour hold		Swing	+4.9	
