= Quibell =

Quibell may refer to:

== People ==
- Baron Quibell, a title created in the Peerage of the United Kingdom
- David Quibell, 1st Baron Quibell (1879–1962), British politician
- James Quibell (1867–1935), British Egyptologist
- Michelle Quibell (born 1984), American squash player

== Places ==
- Quibell, Ontario, community in Ontario
- Quibell Park Stadium in Scunthorpe, North Lincolnshire
