= 1907 Brigg by-election =

UK Parliamentary by-election

- 26 February 1907

Candidate	Sheffield	Guest
Party	Conservative	Liberal
Popular vote	5,389	5,273
Percentage	50.5%	49.5%
MP before election
Harold Reckitt
Liberal
Subsequent MP
Alfred Gelder
Liberal

The 1907 Brigg by-election was held on 26 February 1907. The by-election was held due to the resignation of the incumbent Liberal MP, Harold Reckitt. It was won by the Conservative candidate Berkeley Sheffield.

== History ==
General election 1906: Brigg
Party	Candidate	Votes	%	±%
Liberal	Harold Reckitt	5,753	58.8	+4.2
Conservative	Geoffrey Henry Julian Skeffington Smyth	4,027	41.2	−4.2
Majority		1,726	17.6	+8.4
Turnout		9,780	83.3	−0.5
Registered electors		11,737		
Liberal hold		Swing	+4.2	

== Result ==
Sheffield

Brigg by-election, 1907
Party	Candidate	Votes	%	±%
Conservative	Berkeley Sheffield	5,389	50.5	+9.3
Liberal	Frederick Guest	5,273	49.5	−9.3
Majority		116	1.0	N/A
Turnout		10,662	89.5	+6.2
Registered electors		11,908		
Conservative gain from Liberal		Swing	+9.3	

== Aftermath ==
General election January 1910: Brigg
Party	Candidate	Votes	%	±%
Liberal	Alfred Gelder	6,548	50.9	+1.4
Conservative	Berkeley Sheffield	6,311	49.1	−1.4
Majority		237	1.8	N/A
Turnout		12,859	91.5	+2.0
Registered electors		14,048		
Liberal gain from Conservative		Swing	+1.4	
