= 1874 Grand National =

English steeplechase horse race

- Grand National
- Location: Aintree
- Date: 26 March 1874
- Winning horse: (France) Reugny
- Starting price: 5/1 F
- Jockey: (England) Mr. J. M. Richardson
- Trainer: (England) Mr. J. M. Richardson
- Owner: (England) James Machell
- Conditions: Good to soft

The 1874 Grand National was the 36th renewal of the renewal of the Grand National horse race that took place at Aintree near Liverpool, England, on 26 March 1874.

== The Course ==
Most of the course was now railed in to prevent spectators from encroaching in front of the fences after incidents, which had caused issues for the runners in recent years. The table jump, which had been situated at Anchor Bridge crossing had been gradually reduced over recent years since the fence itself was removed in 1869. It went unmentioned this year, suggesting it may no longer have been regarded as a fence. The last fence this year being referred to as the one before where the table had been.

First circuit: From the start, the runners had a long run away from the racecourse, across the lane towards Fence 1 {13} Ditch and Rails. Some contemporary reports that this fence was removed are contradicted in reports of the race itself. Fence 2 {14} Ditch and Bank, modern reports of the race and era call this fence Fan, after a mare who repeatedly refused in multiple races over the fences a few years earlier but contemporary reports do not use this term, Fence 3 {15} Double Rails, Fence 4 {16} Rails and Ditch. Again some reports suggest this either wasn't a ditch or simply wasn't there at all. Fence 5 {17} Becher's Brook Fence 6 {18} Post and Rails, some reports claim this fence was removed but could be confusing this with another fence situated shortly after, which had been removed the previous year. Fence 7 {19} The Canal Turn, referred to this year as the turn for Valentine's. Fence 8 {20} Valentine's Brook, Fence 9 {21} Drop, Fence 10 {22} Post and Rails, Table bank had previously been at this part of the course but had been gradually levelled and no longer considered a fence.

The runners then crossed the lane at the canal bridge to re-enter the racecourse proper, turning at the first opportunity towards the fences in front of the stands. Fence 11 Thorn by the Distance, Fence 12 Stand Water.

Second circuit: The runners then turned away from the Grandstands and crossed the lane again, following the first circuit until reaching the racecourse. This time the runners continued to the wider extreme of the course after crossing the Table at canal bridge before turning to run up the straight in front of the stands where two hurdles, Fence 23 and Fence 24 had to be jumped

The runners then bypassed the Thorn at the Distance and Stand Water inside before reaching the winning post in front of the Main Stand.

== Leading Contenders ==
Reugny was the best of Captain Machell's trio of runners and was an easy to back 5/1 favourite on the back of excellent training gallops. The horse was too easy to back for his owner who delayed until the price was short. Angered, he confronted John Maunsell Richardson, who was due to ride, to mislead the public about the quality of the horse. Richardson refused to due this to people he considered friends and neighbours and a heated row developed. Machell threatened to withdraw the horse entirely while Richardson said he would instead ride Furley to ensure Machell's other runners were beaten. On the day, Richardson mounted, but also stating it would be the last time he would race ride for anyone.

Casse Tete was 1000/15 second favourite, having won the race two years ago. However, it was notable that partner in voctory, John Page opted to switch to ride Fantome instead, giving Harry Day the best fancied ride of the seven riders making their debut.

Vintner was 9/1 and offered the best chance yet, at the fifth attempt for Peter Crawshaw.

Furley was sent off at 100/8, Having almost become the mount of John Maunsell Richardson, who clearly felt he could win if not staying with Reugny. Instead Arthur Yates was booked for his fourth ride in the race.

Columbine was also 100/8 after finishing third last year with Harding again taking the ride.

== The Race ==
Bretby, Chimney Sweep, Daybreak and Congress were first to show crossing Proceed's lane and heading to the first fence where Congress and Last Of The Lambs both fell. The former was very quickly remounted, only to then refuse at fence 3 while the well backed Vintner fell when trying to refuse, Peter Crawshaw suffering a sprained shoulder and having to be helped off the course by Pickard and Joseph Rudd, the riders of Lord Colney and Paladin who both also came down here.

At Becher's Brook Ouragon II was now five lengths clear of Daybreak, Merlin, Columbine, Chimney Sweep and Heraut D'Armes who joined the casualties at the turn for Valentine's Brook.

The Canal side was now largely laid to turf and no longer the plough that used to lead to many horses toiling in previous years and also ensured this part of the course was covered without incident as the runners came back in sigh of the stands.

At the thorn fence Ouragon II continued to lead from Columbine, Merlin, Eurota, Daybreak with Fantome coming down in a fall, which many in the crowd felt would surely result in severe injury to Page. The hooves of Bretby, Chimney Sweep, Derviche, Furley, Master Mowbray and Casse Tete swept past the fallen rider with Congress having done incredibly well to make up the ground lost in the early stages of the race to be ahead of Reugny, Defence, Disturbance and Dainty

Ouragon II and Columbine continued to lead down to Bechers, ahead of Merlin and a small gap to Chimney Sweep, Daybreak, Eurotas, Furley, Congress and Reugny with a further gap to Master Mowbray, Defence and Disturbance with Casse Tete toiling, having broken down badly and Bretby, Derviche and Dainty even further behind.

Merlin and Columbine too up the running at the turn for Valentine's with Ouragon II now dropping back, having broken down while Furley was also showing signs of having run his race. Well to their rear Casse Tete fell at the final fence in the country, long after she should have been pulled up, while Dainty was subsequently brought down.

Merlin now began to kick on coming back onto the racecourse, opening a lead of a dozen lengths over Chimney Sweep who in turn had a dozen lengths on Reugny, Master Mowbray, Eurotas, Defence, and Disturbance as they passed the tired Columbine.

Chimney Sweep hunted down Merlin as they raced towards the penultimate fence with Reugny now right up with them, although Richardson's progress was checked when hitting the timber hard. Jack Jones was hard at work on Chimney Sweep by the final flight and Reugny quickly opened a lead, drawing away to win by six lengths with another four back to Merlin and the same again to Defence.

== Finishing Order ==
Position	Name	Jockey	Handicap (st-lb)	SP	Distance	Colours
Winner	Reugny	John Richardson	10-12	5/1 Fav	6 lengths	White, blue cap
Second	Chimney Sweep	Jack Jones	10-2	25/1	4 lengths	Turquoise, white cap
Third	Merlin	Jimmy Adams	10-7	40/1	4 lengths	Brown, blue sleeves, black cap
Fourth	Defence	Gilbert Elliott	11-13	33/1		White, blue cap
Fifth	Master Mowbray	Alfred Holman	10-5	50/1		Brown, white sash and cap
Sixth	Disturbance	Joe Cannon	12-9	25/1		White, blue cap
Seventh	Columbine	Harding	10-6	100/8		Blue, black cap
Eighth	Ouragan II	George Mulcaster	10-5	50/1		Red, white sleeves, black cap
Ninth	Derviche	Robert I'Anson	10-12	33/1	Eased with rider injured	Turquoise, black cap
Tenth	Daybreak	Holt	10-11	100/1		Green, gold braid, piping and cap
Eleventh	Eurotas	Tommy Pickernell	11-8	100/7		Blue, buff sash, red cap
Twelfth	Furley	Arthur Yates	11-10	100/8		Blue, black cap
Fence 22 {Post & Rails}	Casse Tete	Harry Day	11-0	100/15	Broke down and fell	Red, yellow cap
Fence 22 {Post & Rails}	Dainty	Joesph Hathaway	10-7	66/1	Brought Down	Green, black sash and cap
Fence 21 {Drop}	Congress	Ted Wilson	11-4	100/6	Fell Fence 1, Refused Fence 3, Pulled Up	Yellow, black piping and cap
Fence 19 {Valentine's Brook}	Bretby	Bill Daniels	10-0	100/1	Pulled Up	Cherry, yellow spots and cap
Fence 11 {Thorn}	Fantome	Johnny Page	10-10	20/1	Fell	Cerise, French grey sleeves and cap
Fence 7 {Turn for Valentine's}	Heraut D'Armes	Captain Doggie Smith	10-8	25/1	Fell	Blue, black cap
Fence 2 {Ditch & Bank}	Lord Colney	Edward Rickard	10-0	100/1	Fell	Brown, orange cap
Fence 2 {Ditch & Bank}	Paladin	Joseph Rudd	10-3	100/1	Fell	Black, red sash, black cap
Fence 2 {Ditch & Bank}	Vintner	Peter Crawshaw	10-3	9/1	Fell	Red
Fence 1 {Post & Rails}	Last Of The Lambs	Jerry Dalglish	10-0	40/1	Fell	Green, gold braid, piping and cap

== Aftermath ==
John Maunsell Richardson stayed true to his word before the race and never rode in a race again. In his memoirs he recalled "Chimney Sweep landed on the racecourse five lengths in front of me and knowning Reugny was not really a stayer, I dare not move on him. When however I saw Jack Jones look round and then give Chimney Sweep two desperate hits with his whip, which did not make the old horse go faster. I sat tight and gradually catching him, went ahead and won by six lengths."

Captain Arthur 'Doggie' Smith had eight rides in the National, finishing second and third, but later reflected that Heraut D'Armes was the best he rode and would have been his best chance of winning the race had the horse not been fitted with an experimental bit that caused him to run poorly.

Despite completing the course, Robert I'Anson had to be lifted from his mount Derviche, having suffered a recurrence of a long standing knee injury.
