= Nottingham Caesars =

American football team based in the United Kingdom

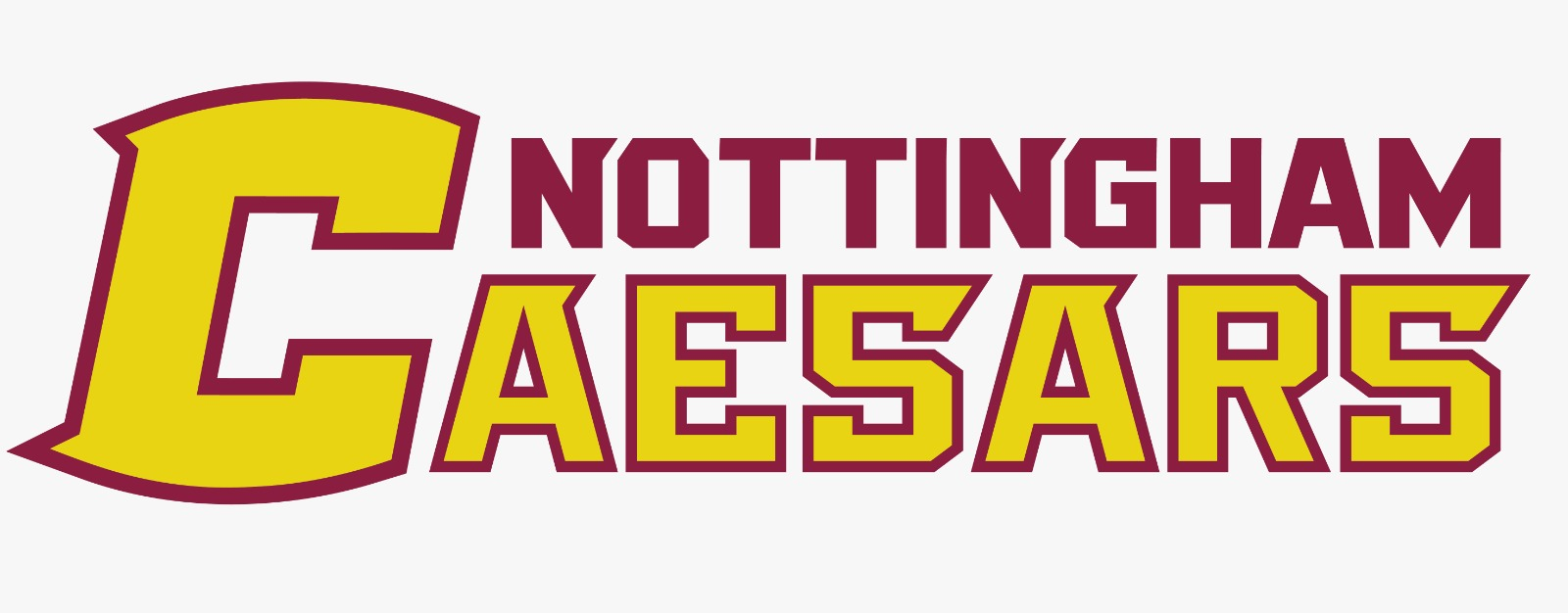
- Founded: 1984; 42 years ago
- League: BAFA National Leagues
- Division: Premiership North
- Team history: Nottingham Hoods (1984–1992); Nottingham Caesars (1992–)
- Location: Nottingham, Nottinghamshire
- Stadium: David Ross Sports Village, University of Nottingham
- Colours: Burgundy, Gold and White
- Chairman: Simon Stockwell
- Head coach: Vanden Warner
- Captain: Liam MacGovern
- Division titles: 7: 1995, 1997, 2003, 2008, 2021, 2023, 2024
- Playoff berths: 8: 1995, 1997, 2002, 2003, 2008, 2016, 2023, 2024

The Nottingham Caesars are an American football team based in Nottingham, Nottinghamshire, England, who operate in the BAFA National Leagues Northern Premiership, the highest level of British American football. They are based at the David Ross Sports Village at the University of Nottingham in Beeston, Nottingham . The team is affectionately known by its players and fans as "The Big C" and was formed in 1984 initially as the youth team of the Nottingham Hoods before later splitting off to form its own adult side.

The club played in the BAFA Premier North in both the 2013 and 2014 seasons before being placed in the second tier of British American Football following a reshuffle of the League structure. They hold seven Divisional titles to their name having won their division in 1995, 1997, 2003, 2008, 2021, 2023 and 2024. The club has reached three Division 1 bowl games, losing in both 1997 and 2003, but defeating the Rushmoor Knights 49–9 in 2024 following their promotion to the Premiership North.

== History ==
The Nottingham Caesars Historic Logo

The Caesars began play in 1992, in competition with the cross-town Nottingham Hoods. The Hoods saw some success including a conference championship in 1992 under the leadership of import players Mike Grossner and Vic Quirolo. The Hoods stopped play in 1994, and this boosted the Caesars considerably, who then posted an undefeated 10–0 record in 1995. Since then, the Caesars have seen moderate success, with 3 conference championships including a trip to the Britbowl in 1997, ending in defeat to the Redbridge Fire 26–7.

Although the team lost out to the Tamworth Phoenix in the 2008 semi-finals, due to the league reshuffle the team earned promotion and in 2008 played in the BAFL 1 South West Conference. The Caesars struggled in 2009 picking up just two wins, 2010 was even less successful with their only win coming at home to the South Wales Warriors on the last day of the season, however this was enough to keep them in Division 1.

In 2012, the Caesars had a good season with an influx of Rookies joining already established players the "Big C" finished with a 7–3 record and made the playoffs. Unfortunately, the Caesars fell at the quarter-final stage away to the Berkshire Renegades.

In 2013, the Caesars were moved into the National Premier Division and it was a season of transition and adjustment to a higher standard of football. The Caesars finished the season with a 1–9 record. In 2014, the Caesars continued in the National Premier Division and made strides forward providing greater competition against Premiership opponents and making a name for themselves as fierce competitors

In 2015, the Caesars played in the Northern Football Conference and finished with a record of 4 wins, 5 losses and a tie. 2016 season brought a successful season with the club making the playoffs in the newly formed MFC 1. With wins against Peterborough Saxons, Ouse Valley Eagles, Doncaster Mustangs and the Birmingham Bulls they finished the year with a 6–4 record and were eventually beaten in a closely fought game against the Edinburgh Wolves.

2020 saw a huge Overhaul coming on Offense with new Coordinator Grant Lawless bringing in several coaches with him. The season was cancelled though due to COVID-19. However, a good pre-season and solid showing against the Hertfordshire Cheetahs in a scrimmage would be a good platform to build upon for 2021.

In 2023, the Nottingham Caesars worked hard in the off-season with a solid recruitment drive of talented coaching staff and players to bolster their roster which marked a cultural shift within the team. The Caesars achieved their first undefeated regular season (10–0–0) in 28 years since 1995, coming top of the NFC South 1 and securing a first round bye in the playoffs. Following a successful semi-final at home vs the Scunthorpe Alphas, the Caesars lost in the final away at the Northumberland Vikings.

The 2024 campaign saw the addition of several coaches and players. Nottingham completed the regular season with an 8-0-0 record and entered the Division 1 playoffs as the top seed. After receiving a first-round bye, the Caesars hosted the Scunthorpe Alphas in the Division 1 North semi final at the DRSV, winning 45-6 to advance to the Northern promotion game. As the top seed, Nottingham hosted the Yorkshire Rams and won 21–10, securing promotion to the Premiership for the first time in more than a decade and qualifying for the Division 1 National Final at Britbowl XXXVI.

In the national final, the Caesars faced the Rushmoor Knights, who had also completed an undefeated regular season. Nottingham won the game 49–9 to claim the Division 1 national title.

== Stadium ==
The Nottingham Caesars play their home games at the David Ross Sports Village based at the University of Nottingham which it shares with the Great Britain Lions National team as their practice facility.

The Caesars previously held their home games at the Harvey Hadden Stadium in Bilborough. The club had been based at the Stadium since the 1980s except a one-year stay at Devon Park, Newark in 1996, a couple of a years at Southglade Leisure Centre (Whilst Harvey Hadden was renovated) and another year at Ilkeston RFC in 2022.

== Team records ==
As Nottingham Hoods

Year	Division	Wins	Losses	Ties	Percentage
1984	Merit Table	1	0	0	1.000
1985 AFL	Midlands Division	7	5	0	0.583
1986 BAFL	National League Central Conference	9	3	0	0.750
1987 Budweiser League	National Division Western Conference	7	3	0	0.700
1988 Budweiser League	National Division Midlands Conference	4	9	1	0.270
1989 Budweiser League	National Division Midlands Conference	4	5	1	0.450
1990 NDMA	Northern Conference	5	5	0	0.500
1991 NDMA	First Division Northern Conference	9	1	0	0.900
1992 NDMA	Division One Northern Conference	9	1	0	0.900
1993 NDMA	Central Conference	5	3	0	0.625
1994 BAFA	Division One	2	8	0	0.200

As Nottingham Caesars

Year	Division	Wins	Losses	Ties	Percentage
1995 BAFA	Division Three North East Conference	10	0	0	1.000
1996 BSL	Division Two Northern Conference	6	4	0	0.600
1997 BSL	Division One Northern Conference	7	1	2	0.889
1998 BSL	Division One Northern Conference	5	5	0	0.500
1999 BSL	Division One Northern Conference	6	3	0	0.667
2000 BSL	Division One Northern Conference	2	6	0	0.250
2001 BSL	Division One Northern Conference	1	7	0	0.125
2002 BSL	Division Two Northern Conference	7	1	2	0.889
2003 BSL	Division Two Northern Conference	9	0	1	0.995
2004 BSL	Division One A Northern Conference	3	6	1	0.335
2005 BAFL	1A Northern Conference	2	7	1	0.225
2006 BAFL	1A Northern Conference	0	10	0	0.000
2007 BAFL	2 Central Conference	8	2	0	0.800
2008 BAFL	2 Central Conference	9	0	1	0.995
2009 BAFL	1 South West Conference	2	8	0	0.200
2010 BAFL	1 South West Conference	1	9	1	0.115
2011 BAFANL	1 Central Conference	6	4	0	0.600
2012 BAFANL	1 Northern Conference	7	3	0	0.700
2013 BAFANL	Premier Division	1	9	0	0.100
2014 BAFANL	Premier Division	1	8	0	0.111
2015 BAFANL	1 Northern Conference	4	5	1	0.445
2016 BAFANL	Midlands Football Conference 1	6	4	0	0.600
2017 BAFANL	Northern Conference Division 1 South	7	3	0	0.700
2018 BAFANL	Northern Conference Division 1 South	4	6	0	0.400
2019 BAFANL	Northern Conference Division 1 South	5	5	0	0.500
2021 BAFANL*	Central East	8	0	0	1.000
2022 BAFANL	Northern Conference Division 1 South	7	3	0	0.700
2023 BAFANL	Northern Conference Division 1 South	10	0	0	1.000
2024 BAFANL	Northern Conference Division 1 Midlands	11	0	0	1.000
2025 BAFANL	Northern Premiership	2	6	0	0.250
2026 BAFANL	Northern Premiership	3	5	0	0.375

COVID-19 Amalgamated League Season*

=== Playoffs ===
Year	Opponent	W/L	Score
2016 BAFANL	Edinburgh Wolves	Loss	22–6
2023 BAFANL	Scunthorpe Alphas Northumberland Vikings*	Win Loss	20-6 34–13
2024 BAFANL	Scunthorpe Alphas Yorkshire Rams* Rushmoor Knights**	Win Win Win	45-6 21–10 49–9

Division 1 North Promotion game (2023, 2024)*

Britbowl XXXVI Division 1 National Championship game (2024)**

== Junior team ==
The Nottingham Caesars also field a Junior team in the U19 competition.

Year	Division	Wins	Losses	Ties	Percentage
2015 BAFANL U19	North Two	4	1	1	0.750
2016 BAFANL U19	South Two	3	3	0	0.500
2017 BAFANL U19	North	6	0	0	1.000
2018 BAFANL U19					
2019 BAFANL U19	1 North	1	4	0	0.200
2021 BAFANL U19	1 Midlands	0	2	0	0.000
2022 BAFANL U19	1 Midlands	4	1	1	0.750
2023 BAFANL U19	1 Midlands	6	0	0	1.000

=== Playoffs ===
Year	Opponent	W/L	Score
2016 BAFANL U19 Plate Semi	London Blitz	W	12–0
2016 BAFANL U19 Plate Final	Highland Wildcats	L	22–14
2017 BAFANL U19 National Semi	East Kilbride	L	
2017 BAFANL U19 Plate Final	Birmingham Lions	L	
2023 BAFANL U19 National Final	London Blitz	L	
