= War Consultative Committee =

The War Consultative Committee was a body set up by the Lieutenant Governor of the Isle of Man William Leveson-Gower, 4th Earl Granville in November 1939, and which functioned as a 'war cabinet' of sorts on the island during the Second World War. For Granville, the function of the War Consultative Committee would be to provide advice to him on the legislation, policy and the daily affairs of the island. The Committee had no specific constitutional status.

Granville appointed seven members to the Committee, from different sides of the political spectrum. All seven were members of Tynwald, five Members of the House of Keys and two Members of the Legislative Council. The ex-officio member of the Legislative Council Deemster William Percy Cowley served as its chairman. Other initial members were James Corrin (MLC, Labour), Walter C. Craine (MHK, Labour), Alfred Teare (MHK, Labour), Arthur E. Kitto (MHK), Samuel Norris (MHK) and Daniel J. Teare (MHK). The Attorney General and the Government Secretary attended the sessions of the War Consultative Committee as advisers. The weekly sessions of the Committee were strictly confidential.

Norris resigned in 1942. His seat was filled by Arthur J. Cottier, MHK.

Daniel J. Teare died in 1943. His seat was filled by George H. Moore, MHK.

Through the experience of working with the War Consultative Committee, the House of Keys argued towards the British government in favour of a more constitutional form of government for the island. In 1946 the Executive Council of the Isle of Man was formed as a new advisory body to the Lieutenant Governor, substituting the War Consultative Committee.
