= Summerland disaster =

1973 fire in Douglas, Isle of Man

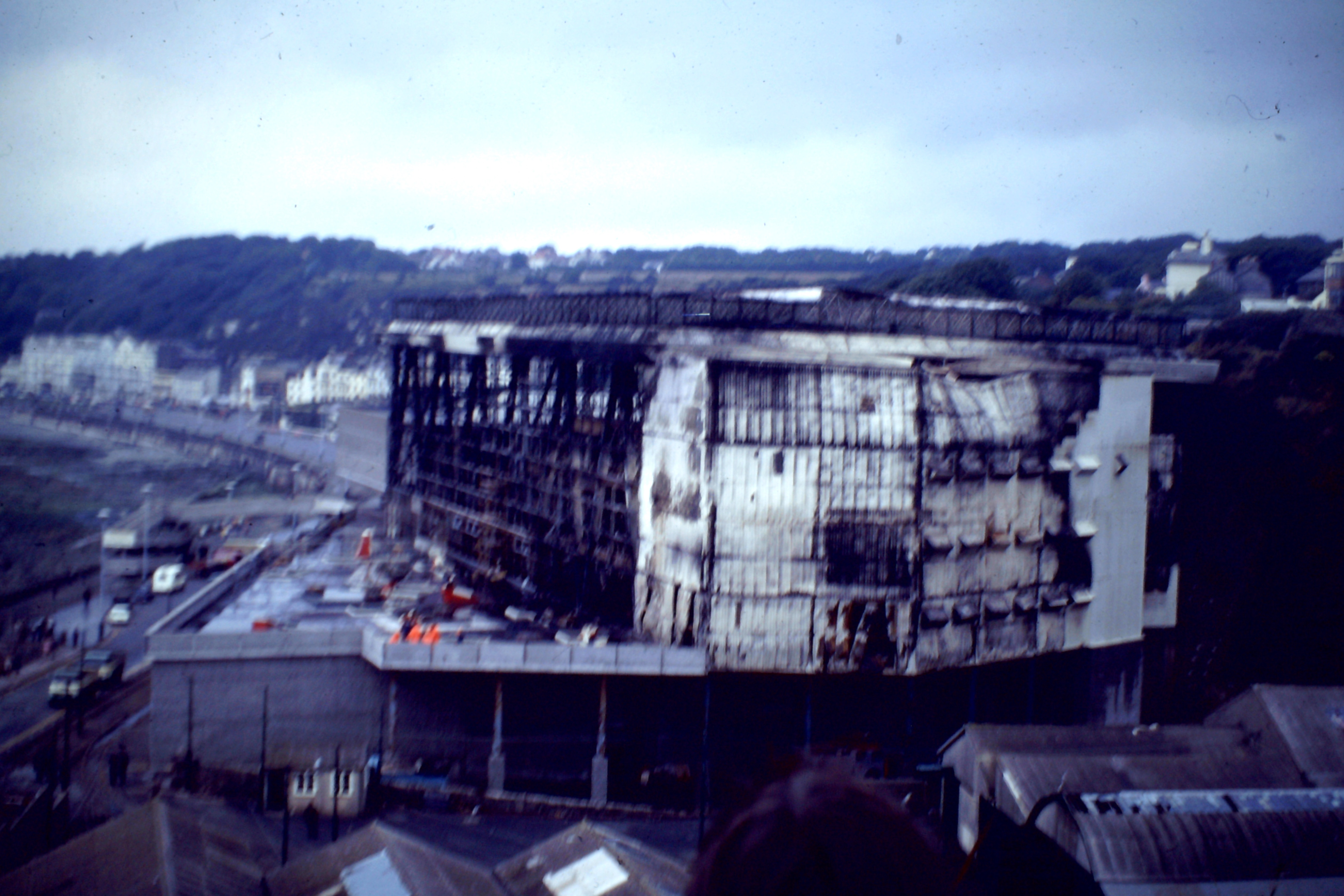
- The burnt out remains of the centre in September 1973, one month after the fire.
- Date: 2 August 1973
- Venue: Summerland Leisure Centre
- Location: Douglas, Isle of Man; 54°10′02″N 04°27′27″W
- Type: Fire
- Cause: Discarded match
- Deaths: 50
- Injuries: 80

The Summerland disaster occurred when a fire spread through the Summerland leisure centre in Douglas on the Isle of Man on the night of 2 August 1973. Fifty people were killed and 80 seriously injured. The scale of the fire has been compared to those seen during the Blitz.

== Background ==
Summerland was opened on 25 May 1971. It was a climate-controlled building covering 3.5 acres (1.4 ha) on Douglas's waterfront, consisting of 50,000 sq ft (4,600 m^{2}) of floor area constructed at a cost of £2 million. The building's exterior and the interior were designed by two architects who did not coordinate their planning with each other and thereby created a venue with significant fire risks.

Summerland was designed to accommodate up to 10,000 tourists and consisted of a dance hall, five floors of holiday games, a rollerskating rink, restaurants and public bars. It was an example of Modernist architecture, incorporated an advanced controlled internal climate and was built with novel construction techniques and materials. The street frontage and part of the roof was clad in Oroglas, a transparent acrylic glass sheeting.

== Fire ==
The fire started at around 7:30 p.m. on 2 August 1973 while approximately 3,000 people were inside. It was caused by three boys, who were smoking in a small disused kiosk on the centre's miniature golf course, and who told police it was likely started by a carelessly discarded match or stub. The burning kiosk collapsed against the exterior of the building. This part of the building was clad in a material called Galbestos: a profiled steel sheeting with asbestos felt on both sides, which was coated with bitumen and had no fire-resistant qualities. The fire spread to the wall's interior soundproofing material, which was highly combustible, causing an intense fire that ignited the flammable acrylic sheeting that covered the rest of the building. The fire quickly spread across the sheeting on the leisure centre walls and roof and through vents which were not properly fireproofed. The acrylic material melted, allowing more oxygen to enter and dropping burning molten material, which started other fires and injured those trying to escape. The building's open-plan design included many unblocked internal spaces that acted as chimneys, adding to the conflagration.

There was no attempt to evacuate the 3,000 people present until the visible evidence of the flames prompted a panic-stricken, mass rush for the exits. The fire was contained in an internal space within the walls until it penetrated the interior, destroying the wiring of the fire alarm system in the process. One survivor (who was a child at the time) remembered that her father had noticed smoke coming from the ventilation shaft and started to attempt to evacuate, when the whole area erupted in flames. The survivor and her mother were separated from her father and sister and stuck in the venue before being rescued through a window by firemen.

Because of the locked fire doors, many people headed to the main entrance, which caused a crush.

The fire services were not called for over 20 minutes and, even then, the call did not originate from Summerland. Instead, the first call came from a passing taxi driver, while another came from the captain of a ship 2 miles (3.2 km) offshore, who radioed HM Coastguard and said, "It looks as if the whole of the Isle of Man is on fire". The Coastguard immediately called the fire brigade. The first responding fire crews realised additional resources would be required, and almost every resource available to the Isle of Man Fire and Rescue Service was mobilised to the incident, including 93 of its 106 firefighters and all 16 of its engines.

== Victims ==
The fire killed 50 people, 11 of them under the age of 20. Around 80 people were seriously injured in the resulting crush and fire and received physical and mental scars. The fire brigade's provisional total of 51 deaths at the scene was subsequently revised down to 48, while two others died in hospital, one in Douglas on 11 August and the other in Scotland on 29 September; the latter is excluded from the Isle of Man coroner's list of 49 deaths. Ian Phillips of Birmingham University suggests that these reporting discrepancies explain why some sources have given incorrect death tolls of 49, 51, or 53. The inscription on the 1998 disaster memorial did not give a death toll; its 2013 replacement lists all 50 names.

== Aftermath ==
The death toll brought about a public inquiry that ran from September 1973 to February 1974. Denis Cowley QC acted for the Douglas Corporation. No specific individuals or groups were blamed and the deaths were attributed to misadventure, although the delay in evacuation and the flammable building materials were condemned.

On 17 September 1973, three Liverpool boys and one from Glasgow appeared before Douglas Juvenile Court and admitted wilfully and unlawfully damaging the lock of a plastic kiosk next to Summerland. They were each fined £3 (equivalent to £32.62 in 2025) and ordered to pay 33p compensation and 15p costs.

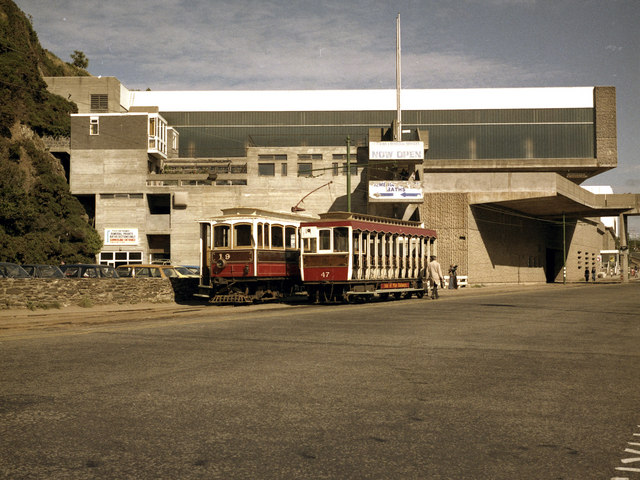
The rebuilt, smaller Summerland with Manx Electric Railway, 1978

The centre was seriously damaged by the fire. Its charred steel skeletal remains were demolished in 1975 and the centre was then rebuilt on a smaller scale. Construction commenced in 1976 with less plastic walls than the original, and with an advanced fire extinguisher and alarm system. The centre reopened in June 1978.

Soon after the disaster, John Hinnigan was brought in from Blackburn Fire and Rescue to become the new chief.

After the fire, changes to building regulations to improve fire safety were introduced.

=== 2002 flood and final closure ===
In October 2002, torrential rain caused damage to several structures, as well as two landslides behind Summerland, which dislodged two 50-tonne concrete blocks that had once supported the roof of the original building but had not been removed in the wake of the fire. A geotechnical team determined that the blocks could not be safely stabilised or removed, and that there was a risk they would fall into the buildings below, so the site was scheduled for demolition. With the building also suffering from concrete cancer, the remainder of the site closed in 2004, and demolition began in January 2006. Today, the site where the Summerland leisure centre once sat is an empty, undeveloped plot. The west wall remains intact, as there is concern that its removal may cause the adjacent cliff to collapse.

== Memorials ==
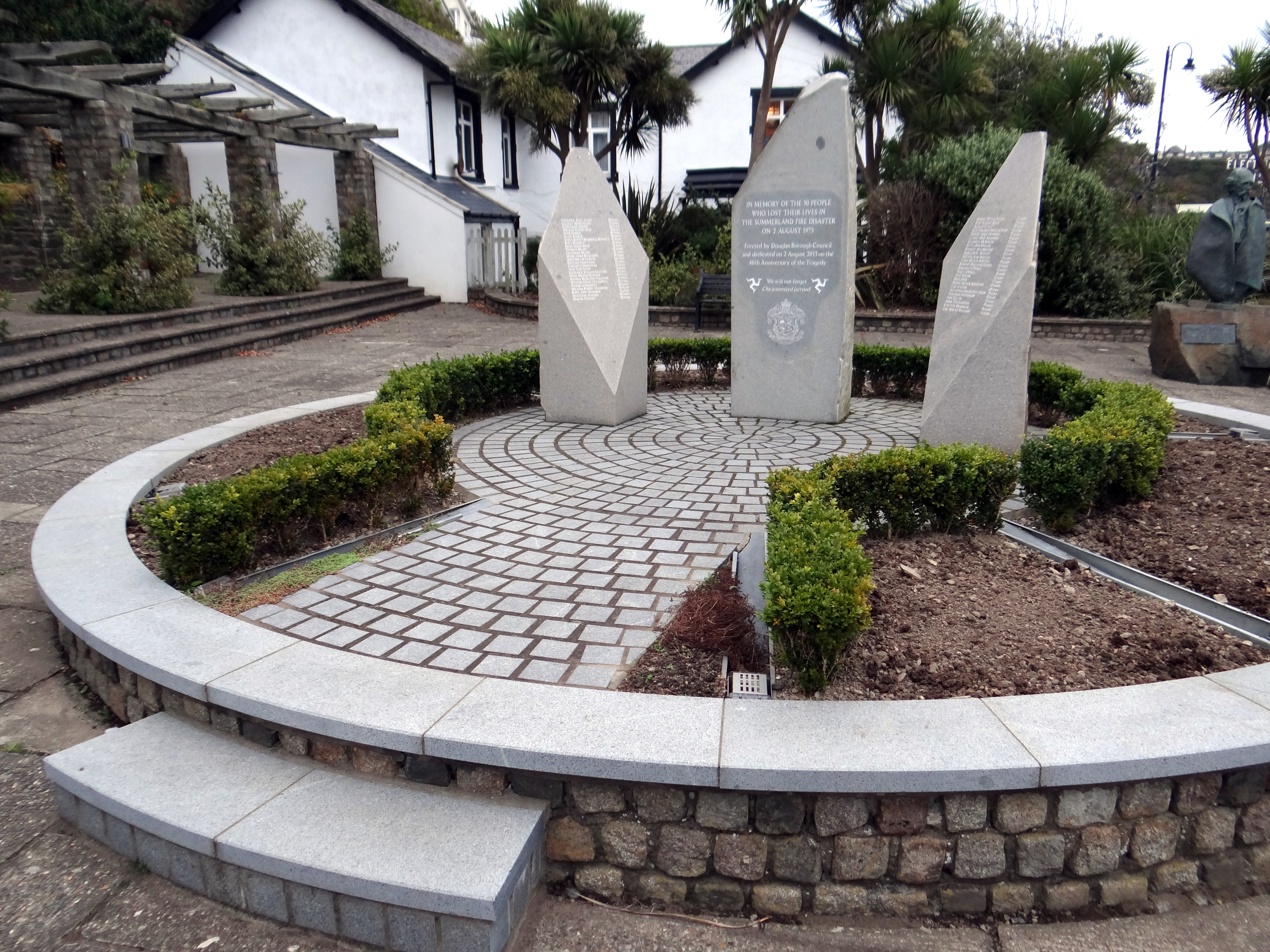
The Kaye Memorial Garden

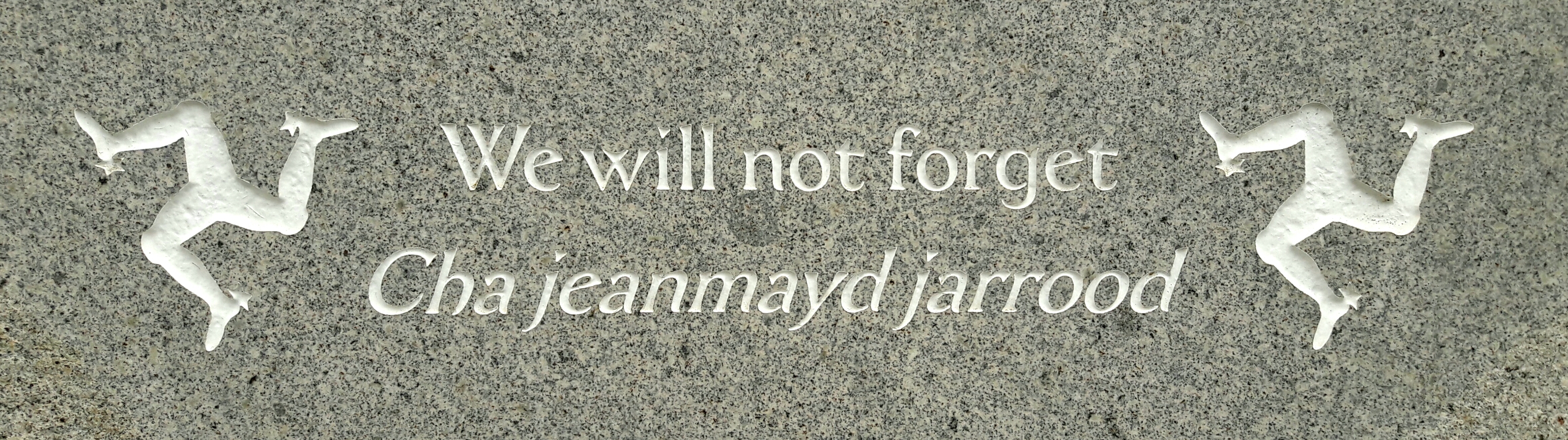
English and Manx inscription on the Summerland Disaster memorial

Forty years after the fire, a permanent memorial in the form of three granite columns was unveiled at Kaye Memorial Gardens, at the bottom of Summer Hill. It bears the names of those killed in the fire and is set into a circle of paving, alongside a stone laid earlier to mark the 25th anniversary.

On other anniversaries of the disaster, many memorials take place, such as a memorial concert and a moment of silence at the location which is now a vacant site.

== Depiction in media ==
One survivor, Ruth McQuillan-Wilson, wrote about her experiences from the fire in a book entitled Made in Summerland, which was published in July 2017.

== See also ==
- Stardust fire, 1981
