= Brigg (constituency) =

County constituency centred on the town of Brigg in North Lincolnshire

- Former county constituency for the House of Commons
- County: Lincolnshire (the area is now in North Lincolnshire)

1885–1974
- Seats: One
- Created from: North Lincolnshire
- Replaced by: Brigg & Scunthorpe

Brigg was a county constituency centred on the town of Brigg in North Lincolnshire. It returned one Member of Parliament (MP) to the House of Commons of the Parliament of the United Kingdom, elected by the first-past-the-post voting system.

The constituency was created for the 1885 general election, and abolished for the February 1974 general election when it was replaced by the new constituency of Brigg and Scunthorpe.

== Boundaries ==
1885–1918: The Borough of Great Grimsby, the Sessional Divisions of Barton-upon-Humber, Brigg, and Winterton, and part of the Sessional Division of Grimsby.

1918–1950: The Urban Districts of Barton-upon-Humber, Brigg, Broughton, Brumby and Frodingham, Roxby-cum-Risby, Scunthorpe, and Winterton, and the Rural District of Glanford Brigg.

1950–1974: The Borough of Scunthorpe, the Urban Districts of Barton-upon-Humber and Brigg, and the Rural District of Glanford Brigg.

== Members of Parliament ==
Election	Member	Party
1885	Sir Henry Meysey-Thompson, Bt.	Liberal
1886	Sir Henry Meysey-Thompson, Bt.	Liberal Unionist
1886	Samuel Danks Waddy	Liberal
1894 by-election	John Maunsell Richardson	Conservative
1895	Harold Reckitt	Liberal
1907 by-election	Sir Berkeley Sheffield	Conservative
1910 (January)	Alfred Gelder	Liberal
1918	Charles Wesley Weldon McLean	Coalition Conservative
1922	Sir Berkeley Sheffield	Conservative
1929	David Quibell	Labour
1931	Michael John Hunter	Conservative
1935	David Quibell	Labour
1945	Tom Williamson	Labour
1948 by-election	Lance Mallalieu	Labour
February 1974	constituency abolished: see Brigg and Scunthorpe	

== Elections ==
=== Elections in the 1880s ===
General election 1885: Brigg
Party	Candidate	Votes	%	±%
Liberal	Henry Meysey-Thompson	5,643	65.2	
Conservative	Henry Atkinson	3,006	34.8	
Majority		2,637	30.4	
Turnout		8,649	83.8	
Registered electors		10,323		
Liberal win (new seat)				

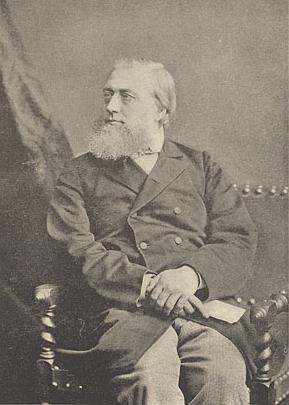
Waddy

General election 1886: Brigg
Party	Candidate	Votes	%	±%
Liberal	Samuel Danks Waddy	3,887	51.1	−14.1
Conservative	John Maunsell Richardson	3,722	48.9	+14.1
Majority		165	2.2	−28.2
Turnout		7,609	73.7	−10.1
Registered electors		10,323		
Liberal hold		Swing	−14.1	

=== Elections in the 1890s ===
General election 1892: Brigg
Party	Candidate	Votes	%	±%
Liberal	Samuel Danks Waddy	4,448	52.5	+1.4
Conservative	John Maunsell Richardson	4,021	47.5	−1.4
Majority		427	5.0	+2.8
Turnout		8,469	81.9	+8.2
Registered electors		10,341		
Liberal hold		Swing	+1.4	

Reckitt

1894 Brigg by-election
Party	Candidate	Votes	%	±%
Conservative	John Maunsell Richardson	4,377	50.4	+2.9
Liberal	Harold Reckitt	4,300	49.6	−2.9
Majority		77	0.8	N/A
Turnout		8,677	82.8	+0.9
Registered electors		10,478		
Conservative gain from Liberal		Swing	+2.9	

General election 1895: Brigg
Party	Candidate	Votes	%	±%
Liberal	Harold Reckitt	4,886	54.3	+1.8
Conservative	John Maunsell Richardson	4,110	45.7	−1.8
Majority		776	8.6	+3.6
Turnout		8,996	77.2	−4.7
Registered electors		11,656		
Liberal hold		Swing	+1.8	

=== Elections in the 1900s ===
General election 1900: Brigg
Party	Candidate	Votes	%	±%
Liberal	Harold Reckitt	4,899	54.6	+0.3
Conservative	George Herbert Peake	4,077	45.4	−0.3
Majority		822	9.2	+0.6
Turnout		8,976	83.8	+6.6
Registered electors		10,713		
Liberal hold		Swing	+0.3	

General election 1906: Brigg
Party	Candidate	Votes	%	±%
Liberal	Harold Reckitt	5,753	58.8	+4.2
Conservative	Geoffrey Henry Julian Skeffington Smyth	4,027	41.2	−4.2
Majority		1,726	17.6	+8.4
Turnout		9,780	83.3	−0.5
Registered electors		11,737		
Liberal hold		Swing	+4.2	

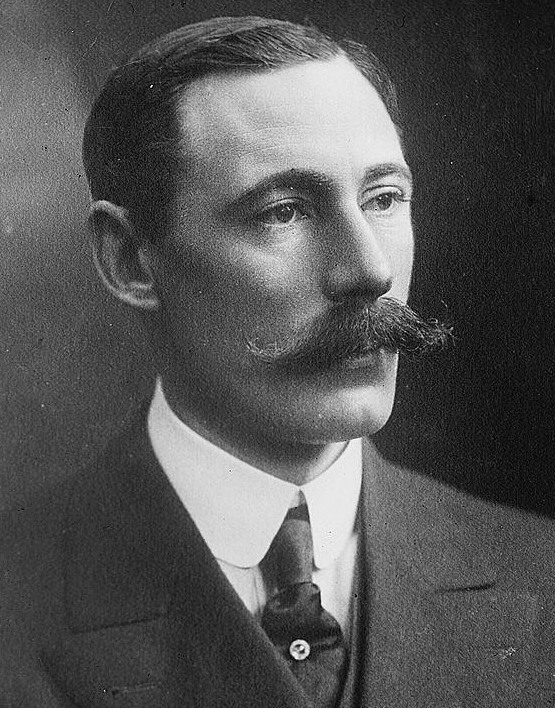
Guest

1907 Brigg by-election
Party	Candidate	Votes	%	±%
Conservative	Berkeley Sheffield	5,389	50.5	+9.3
Liberal	Frederick Guest	5,273	49.5	−9.3
Majority		116	1.0	N/A
Turnout		10,662	89.5	+6.2
Registered electors		11,908		
Conservative hold		Swing	+9.3	

=== Elections in the 1910s ===
Sheffield

General election January 1910: Brigg
Party	Candidate	Votes	%	±%
Liberal	Alfred Gelder	6,548	50.9	−7.9
Conservative	Berkeley Sheffield	6,311	49.1	+7.9
Majority		237	1.8	−15.8
Turnout		12,859	91.5	+8.2
Registered electors		14,048		
Liberal hold		Swing	−7.9	

Gelder

General election December 1910: Brigg
Party	Candidate	Votes	%	±%
Liberal	Alfred Gelder	6,506	53.6	+2.7
Conservative	Thomas Jewell Bennett	5,637	46.4	−2.7
Majority		869	7.2	+5.4
Turnout		12,143	86.4	−5.1
Registered electors		14,048		
Liberal hold		Swing	+2.7	

General Election 1914–15:

Another General Election was required to take place before the end of 1915. The political parties had been making preparations for an election to take place and by July 1914, the following candidates had been selected;

- Liberal: Alfred Gelder
- Unionist: Thomas Jewell Bennett

General election 1918: Brigg
Party		Candidate	Votes	%	±%
C	Unionist	Charles Wesley Weldon McLean	8,310	47.2	+0.8
	Labour	David Quibell	4,789	27.3	New
	Liberal	Alfred Gelder	4,475	25.5	−28.1
Majority			3,521	19.9	N/A
Turnout			17,574	60.5	−25.9
Registered electors			29,054		
	Unionist gain from Liberal		Swing		
C indicates candidate endorsed by the coalition government.

=== Elections in the 1920s ===
General election 1922: Brigg
Party	Candidate	Votes	%	±%
Unionist	Berkeley Sheffield	15,463	62.7	+15.5
Labour	David Quibell	9,185	37.3	+10.0
Majority		6,278	25.4	+5.5
Turnout		24,648	80.3	+19.8
Registered electors		30,685		
Unionist hold		Swing	+2.8	

General election 1923: Brigg
Party	Candidate	Votes	%	±%
Unionist	Berkeley Sheffield	12,412	53.6	−9.1
Labour	David Quibell	10,753	46.4	+9.1
Majority		1,659	7.2	−18.2
Turnout		23,165	72.8	−7.5
Registered electors		31,818		
Unionist hold		Swing	−9.1	

General election 1924: Brigg
Party	Candidate	Votes	%	±%
Unionist	Berkeley Sheffield	15,125	56.4	+2.8
Labour	David Quibell	11,669	43.6	−2.8
Majority		3,456	12.8	+5.6
Turnout		26,794	80.9	+8.1
Registered electors		33,124		
Unionist hold		Swing	+2.8	

General election 1929: Brigg
Party	Candidate	Votes	%	±%
Labour	David Quibell	16,117	45.2	+1.6
Unionist	Berkeley Sheffield	12,506	35.0	−21.4
Liberal	Alexander Cairns	7,060	19.8	New
Majority		3,611	10.2	N/A
Turnout		35,683	82.5	+1.6
Registered electors		43,226		
Labour gain from Unionist		Swing	+11.5	

=== Elections in the 1930s ===
General election 1931: Brigg
Party	Candidate	Votes	%	±%
Conservative	Michael John Hunter	21,809	58.3	+23.3
Labour	David Quibell	15,614	41.7	−3.5
Majority		6,195	16.6	N/A
Turnout		37,423	82.1	−0.4
Registered electors		45,565		
Conservative gain from Labour		Swing	+13.4	

General election 1935: Brigg
Party	Candidate	Votes	%	±%
Labour	David Quibell	18,495	50.3	+8.6
Conservative	Michael John Hunter	18,292	49.7	−8.6
Majority		203	0.6	N/A
Turnout		36,787	74.2	−7.9
Registered electors		49,597		
Labour gain from Conservative		Swing	+8.6	

=== Elections in the 1940s ===
General election 1945: Brigg
Party	Candidate	Votes	%	±%
Labour	Tom Williamson	26,771	58.92	+8.6
Conservative	Anthony Neville Dixon	18,667	41.08	−8.6
Majority		8,104	17.84	+17.2
Turnout		45,438	74.61	+0.4
Labour hold		Swing	+8.6	

1948 Brigg by-election
Party	Candidate	Votes	%	±%
Labour	Edward Lancelot Mallalieu	27,333	54.58	−4.34
Conservative	Anthony Fell	22,746	45.42	+4.34
Majority		4,587	9.16	−8.68
Turnout		50,079	77.10	+0.50
Labour hold		Swing	−4.30	

=== Elections in the 1950s ===
General election 1950: Brigg
Party	Candidate	Votes	%	±%
Labour	Lance Mallalieu	28,934	52.71	−6.21
Conservative	Meaburn Francis Staniland	18,521	33.74	−7.34
Liberal	Denis Martin Cowley	7,438	13.55	New
Majority		10,413	18.97	+1.13
Turnout		54,893	85.70	+8.60
Labour hold		Swing		

General election 1951: Brigg
Party	Candidate	Votes	%	±%
Labour	Lance Mallalieu	31,151	57.46	+4.76
Conservative	Charles P Lawson	23,062	42.54	+8.84
Majority		8,089	14.92	−4.08
Turnout		54,213	82.42	−3.28
Registered electors		65,775		
Labour hold		Swing	−2.04	

General election 1955: Brigg
Party	Candidate	Votes	%	±%
Labour	Lance Mallalieu	27,847	54.95	−2.51
Conservative	David S B Hopkins	22,826	45.05	+2.51
Majority		5,021	9.90	−5.02
Turnout		50,673	74.73	−7.69
Registered electors		67,808		
Labour hold		Swing	−2.51	

General election 1959: Brigg
Party	Candidate	Votes	%	±%
Labour	Lance Mallalieu	28,997	51.88	−3.07
Conservative	Roland Croft Baker	26,893	48.12	+3.07
Majority		2,104	3.76	−6.14
Turnout		55,890	78.57	+3.84
Registered electors		71,138		
Labour hold		Swing	−3.07	

=== Elections in the 1960s ===
General election 1964: Brigg
Party	Candidate	Votes	%	±%
Labour	Lance Mallalieu	29,480	49.76	−2.12
Conservative	Roland Croft Baker	22,674	38.27	−9.95
Liberal	Keith W Baynes	7,088	11.96	New
Majority		6,806	11.49	+7.73
Turnout		59,242	77.52	−1.05
Registered electors		76,420		
Labour hold		Swing	+3.92	

General election 1966: Brigg
Party	Candidate	Votes	%	±%
Labour	Lance Mallalieu	33,699	60.08	+10.32
Conservative	Ann Spokes	22,391	39.92	+1.65
Majority		11,308	20.16	+8.67
Turnout		56,090	72.39	−5.13
Registered electors		77,484		
Labour hold		Swing	+4.34	

=== Elections in the 1970s ===
General election 1970: Brigg
Party	Candidate	Votes	%	±%
Labour	Lance Mallalieu	31,434	53.38	−6.70
Conservative	Ann Spokes	27,449	46.62	+6.70
Majority		3,985	6.76	−13.40
Turnout		58,883	67.55	−4.84
Registered electors		87,166		
Labour hold		Swing	−6.70	

== See also ==
- 1948 Brigg by-election
