= John Maunsell Richardson =

English cricketer

J. Maunsell Richardson
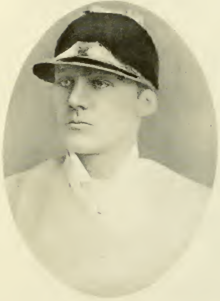

Personal information
- Full name: John Maunsell Richardson
- Born: 12 June 1846; Great Limber, Caistor, Lincolnshire, England
- Died: 22 January 1912 (aged 65); Westminster, London, England
- Nickname: Cat
- Batting: Right-handed
- Bowling: Right arm slow (roundarm)

Domestic team information
- Years: Team
- 1866: Gentlemen of England
- 1866–1868: Cambridge University
- 1874: Marylebone Cricket Club (MCC)

Career statistics
Competition	First-class
Matches	18
Runs scored	347
Batting average	11.56
100s/50s	0/1
Top score	58
Balls bowled	60
Wickets	1
Bowling average	35
5 wickets in innings	0
10 wickets in match	0
Best bowling	1/21
Catches/stumpings	10/–
- Source: Cricinfo, 4 June 2009

John Maunsell Richardson JP DL (Great Limber, Caistor, Lincolnshire 12 June 1846 – Westminster, London, 22 January 1912), known to his friends as the "Cat", was a cricketer who played First-class cricket for Cambridge University, Member of Parliament and a steeplechase jockey who won two Grand Nationals as a rider in the 1870s.

Richardson was educated at Harrow and Magdalene College, Cambridge.

== Cricket ==
Maunsell Richardson played alongside future England Cricket and Rugby Union captain A.N. Hornby for Harrow in both the 1864 and 1865 Eton v Harrow cricket matches, contributing 29 and 24 in innings victories over Eton.

Richardson made his first-class debut for Gentlemen of England against Oxford University in 1866, playing in the same team as another future England captain in a 17-year-old W.G. Grace.

Richardson played for Cambridge University in 3 successive University Matches against Oxford University from 1866 to 1868. In 1866, Richardson contributed 8 and 6 in a 12 run defeat, 3 and 8 in a 5 wicket victory in 1867 and 3 and 14 in a 168 run victory in 1868.

Richardson's last first-class cricket match was for the Marylebone Cricket Club (MCC) v Nottinghamshire in 1874. MCC beat a strong Nottinghamshire side that included future England captain Alfred Shaw by 6 wickets.

== Grand Nationals ==
Richardson was one of the great gentleman riders of his day having 56 winners in 1872, in addition he trained race horses at his Limber Magna stables. He won the 1873 and 1874 Grand Nationals riding horses he had trained being Disturbance and Reugny. Both were owned by James Octavius Machell with whom he fell out when Machell tried to manipulated the betting for the 1874 race. Richardson was so offended at the proposal made to him and disgusted with the sordid nature of the whole business that he made up his mind that, win or lose, his race on Reugny should be his last.

== Member of Parliament ==
Richardson won the 1894 by-election for Brigg, but lost that seat in the general election in the following year.

== Family ==
In 1881, Richardson married Victoria Alexandrina (née Hare), the Countess of Yarborough and widow of his friend Charles Anderson-Pelham, 3rd Earl of Yarborough, who had died six years earlier. His wife, though legally Victoria Richardson, continued to be known as Victoria, Countess of Yarborough.

They had one son, John Richardson.

Parliament of the United Kingdom
Preceded by Samuel Danks Waddy	Member of Parliament for Brigg; 1894 – 1895	Succeeded by Harold James Reckitt
