= 1894 Brigg by-election =

UK Parliamentary by-election

The 1894 Brigg by-election was held on 7 December 1894. The by-election was held due to the appointment of the incumbent Liberal MP, Samuel Danks Waddy as recorder of Sheffield. It was won by the Conservative candidate John Maunsell Richardson.

== Result ==
Brigg by-election, 1894
Party	Candidate	Votes	%	±%
Conservative	John Maunsell Richardson	4,377	50.4	+2.9
Liberal	Harold James Reckitt	4,300	49.6	−2.9
Majority		77	0.8	N/A
Turnout		8,677	82.8	+0.9
Conservative gain from Liberal		Swing	+5.9	
