= 1873 Grand National =

English steeplechase horse race

- Grand National
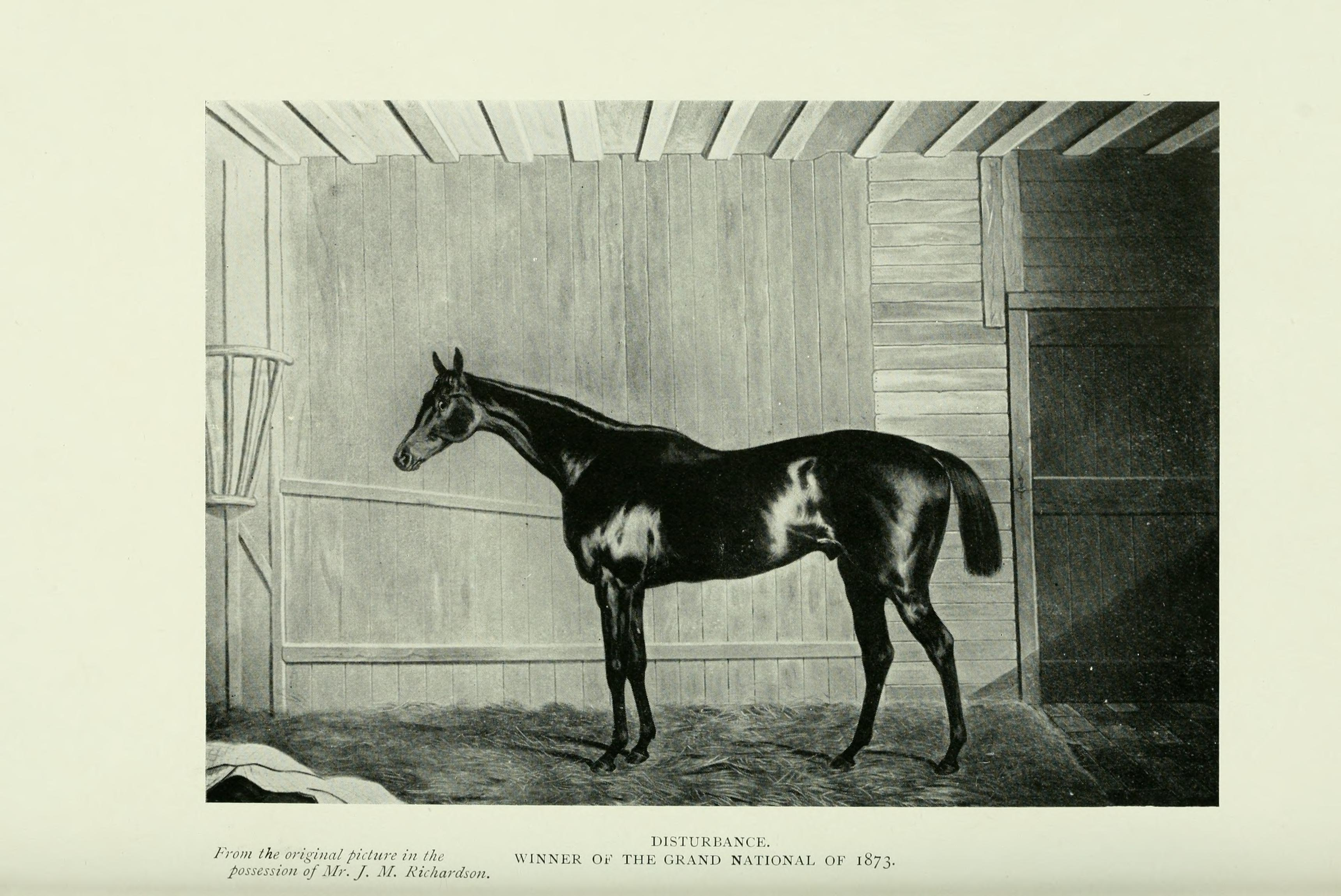
- Disturbance (from Heroes and heroines of the Grand National)
- Location: Aintree
- Date: 27 March 1873
- Winning horse: Disturbance
- Starting price: 20/1
- Jockey: (England) Mr. J. M. Richardson
- Trainer: (England) Mr. J. M. Richardson
- Owner: (England) James Machell
- Conditions: Good not taken

The 1873 Grand National was the 35th renewal of the Grand National horse race that took place at Aintree near Liverpool, England, on 27 March 1873.

== The Course ==
There is a great deal of room for conjecture over the course in 1873 as several conflicting reports of it were made in the press. The fences again appeared to have been made smaller and some reports omit either fences 1, 4 or 6 from their descriptions. Most reports describe the course to consist of 26 obstacles in total

First circuit: From the start, the runners had a long run away from the racecourse, across the lane towards Fence 1 {14} Ditch and Rails. Some contemporary reports that this fence was removed are contradicted in reports of the race itself. Fence 2 {15} Ditch and Bank, modern reports of the race and era call this fence Fan, after a mare who repeatedly refused in multiple races over the fences a few years earlier but contemporary reports do not use this term, Fence 3 {16} Double Rails, Fence 4 {17} Rails and Ditch. Again some reports suggest this either wasn't a ditch or simply wasn't there at all. Fence 5 {18} Becher's Brook Fence 6 {19} Post and Rails, some reports claim this fence was removed but could be confusing this with another fence situated shortly after, which had been removed the previous year. Fence 7 {20} Second Post and Rails, situated at the Canal Turn, referred to this year as the tirn for Valentine's. Fence 8 {21} Valentine's Brook, Fence 9 {22} Drop, Fence 10 {23} Post and Rails, Fence 11 {24} Table Bank, being gradually reduced year by year and now little more than a minor incline in the course.

The runners then crossed the lane at the canal bridge to re-enter the racecourse proper, turning at the first opportunity towards the fences in front of the stands. Fence 12 Thorn by the Distance, Fence 13 Stand Water.

Second circuit: The runners then turned away from the Grandstands and crossed the lane again, following the first circuit until reaching the racecourse. This time the runners continued to the wider extreme of the course after crossing the Table at canal bridge before turning to run up the straight in front of the stands where two hurdles, Fence 25 and Fence 26 had to be jumped

The runners then bypassed the Thorn at the Distance and Stand Water inside before reaching the winning post in front of the Main Stand.

The number of varied and contradictory accounts of the course in this year make it almost impossible to say with certainty what the actual number of fences were. Some reports did not count the table or the hurdles when numbering the jumps.

== Leading Contenders ==
Footman was made the 100/15 favourite under preparation of Edwin Weever and offered a third ride in the race for Dick Marsh who had yet to complete the course. Under the care of a stable lad, the horse's morning gallop the day before the race only served to strengthen public conviction in the six year old.

Rhysworth was 15/2, having been going well when falling at Becher's second time round last year and was again partnered by William Boxall

Cinderella was 100/12 third favourite and was considered to have been unlucky when brought down at the turn for Valentine's second time round last year. Jimmy Adams retained the ride, hoping to complete the course at the fourth attempt.

Casse Tete was at 10/1 to become the third duel winner of the decade and was again partnered by Johnny Page.

Cecil was also 10/1, the same price he had been sent off at two years earlier where he got no farther than Becher's on the first circuit with Robert I'Anson in the saddle. This time around I'Anson bypassed the ride with a little know rider named Wyatt making his debut instead.

Master Mowbray, Broadlea, Disturbance and Curragh Ranger carried the majority of the punters money among the remainder. The former had finished sixth last year and was again accompanied by the experienced George Holman, Broadlea had the most experienced rider in the race in duel winner, Tommy Pickernell, for whom this was his twelfth ride. Disturbance was mounted by white jacketed John Richardson, for whom this would be a third race ride, and Curragh Ranger was a fourth ride in the race for Kerry rider, Tom Ryan, whose previous best was third in 1869.

== The Race ==
New York, Cecil, Congress and Rhysworth led the field over the first fence without incident before both last year's winner Casse Tete and Acton both lost their bridles jumping the second. Robert I'Anson lost much ground in successfully recovering his but Johnny Page was left with no choice but to pull up before reaching the next fence. Ismael refused here, badly hampering both Cinderella and Reugny in the process.

Rhysworth led over Becher's, but in doing so cut across Cecil who was left stranded on top of the fence, exiting the contest at the same place as two years earlier. Huntsman was brought to a halt and the now tailed off Ismael dug his heels in for the second time.

Turning for Valentine's, New York went back to the head of affairs from Rhysworth, Congress, Solicitor and Star & Garter with Alice Lee taking closer order as they took the fences along the Canal side without incident and began the run towards the Thorn in front of the stands. Betting on being first to clear the water jump was popular and many riders turned the race into a sprint at this point, more interested in winning the half way race than the race itself. Solicitor pipped Congress and Rhysworth to the honour with Alice Lee, New York, Crawler, Star & Garter, Columbine, Red Nob and Curragh Ranger heading the favourite and six others in the main body while Acton, Reugny, Sarchedon, Loustic, Cinderella, Richard I and the near tailed off True Blue formed the tail of the field.

Despite the additions of rails at the several fences along the course, increasing and encroaching crowds continued to present potential problems to the runners. This year two individuals possibly deliberately encroached onto the course at the second fence on the second circuit, bringing down the favourite who in turn was cannoned into by Lingerer and New York while Cinderella was pulled up before the next fence, having twisted a fetlock.

Columbine made steady progress through the field to lead at Bechers from Rhysworth, Alice Lee, Disturbance and Solicitor in indian file, with a gap back to Master Mowbray, Star & Garter, Red Nob and Broadlea while the rapidly tiring Congress pulled up with Sarchedon and Richard I were now a good 100 yards behind the pack with Curragh Rangers following Congresss example. Charlie also quit the race at the turn for Valentine's where the long since tailed off True Blue fell.

By the time the field reached the Drop fence, the last proper obstacle out on the course, the race lay between Columbine, Rhysworth, Alice Lee, Disturbance and Master Mowbray with a gap back to Star & Garter, Revirescat, Reugny and Richard I, while Tommy Pickernell had his boots and breeches torn in a nasty fall with Solicitor, Crawler and Red Nob also brought down.

Rhysworth and Disturbance pulled clear of their rivals by the penultimate hurdle but William Boxall was already hard at work on the former while John Maunsell Richardson clearly had more left in his mount. He drew clear at the final hurdle, drawing away to a six length victory with Columbine a further ten lengtsh behind in third, fifteen lengths of Master Mowbray with Alice Lee leading in thirteen finishers.

== Aftermath ==
There were serious concerns for the welfare of the favourite Footman with the horse appearing to be seriously injured after his fall at the second fence on the second circuit. However, after being given time to recover, the horse was able to return safely to the stables. Congress also was found to be severely distressed after pulling up at Becher's Brook but again was able to walk back to the stables after being given time to recover.

== Finishing Order ==
Position	Name	Jockey	Handicap (st-lb)	SP	Distance	Colours
Winner	Disturbance	John Richardson	11-11	20-1	6 Lengths	White, blue cap
Second	Ryshworth	William Boxall	11-8	8-1	10 Lengths	Pink
Third	Columbine	Harding	10-9	100-1	15 Lengths	Blue, black cap
Fourth	Master Mowbray	George Holman	10-7	100/8		Red, white hoops, red cap
Fifth	Alice Lee	George Waddington	10-3	100/7		Cerise, white sash and cap
Sixth	Star and Garter	Captain Doggie Smith	10-7	66-1		Lilac, cerise sleeves, black cap
Seventh	Richard I	G.Gray	10-3	50-1		Silver, black cap
Eighth	Reugny	Joe Cannon	10-13	40-1		Yellow, purple sleeves, yellow cap
Ninth	Sarchedon	John Pope	10-3	30-1		Orange, black cap
Tenth	Acton	Robert I'Anson	11-1	30-1		Purple, white piping and cap
Eleventh	Loustic	Bambridge	10-13	30-1	Broke Down	Purple
Twelfth	Revirescat	Captain Wenty Hope-Johnstone	11-8	150-1		Green, white sleeves, black cap
Thirteenth and Last {Rem}	Crawler	Arthur Yates	10-10	50-1	Fell Fence 22 {Remounted}	Indigo
Fence 22 {Drop}	Broadlea	Tommy Pickernell	10-5	100-8	Fell	Cerise, blue sleeves and cap
Fence 22 {Drop}	Red Nob	John Goodwin	11-8	40-1	Brought Down	Wine, black cap
Fence 22 {Drop}	Solicitor	Jerry Dalglish	10-8	50-1	Brought Down	Purple, gold braid
Fence 20 {Turn for Valentines}	Charlie	Gregory	10-9	100-1	Pulled Up	White, red cap
Fence 20 {Turn for Valentine's}	True Blue	John Douglas	10-13	50-1	Fell	Green, cerise sleeves, black cap
Fence 18 {Bechers Brook}	Congress	Ted Wilson	10-10	40-1	Pulled Up	Light blue, black and yellow sash, black cap
Fence 18 {Becher's Brook}	Curragh Ranger	Tom Ryan	11-3	25-1		Blue, orange sleeves, black cap
Fence 16 {Double Rails}	Cinderella	Jimmy Adams	10-13	100-12	Pulled Up, Twisted Fetlock	White, blue, sleeves, red cap
Fence 15 {Ditch & Bank}	Footman	Dick Marsh	11-5	100-15 Fav		Blue, red piping
Fence 15 {Ditch & Bank}	Lingerer	John Mumford	10-13	50-1	Brought Down	Black, orange sash, yellow cap
Fence 15 {Ditch & Bank}	New York	William Reeves	10-6	100-1	Brought Down	Light blue, black and yellow sash, black cap
Fence 5 {Bechers Brook}	Cecil	Wyatt	10-9	10-1	Hampered and Fell	Light blue, black cap
Fence 5 {Bechers Brook}	Huntsman	H. Ellison	10-7	150-1	Hampered and Refused	Claret, black sash and cap
Fence 3 {Double Rails}	Casse Tete	Johnny Page	11-8	10-1	Bridle slipped, pulled up	Red, yellow cap
Fence 3 {Double Rails}	Ismael	Bill Daniels	10-13	66-1	Refused, went on and refused again Fence 5 {Bechers}	Yellow, black piping and cap
