= Harvey Hadden Stadium =

Athletics stadium in Nottingham, England

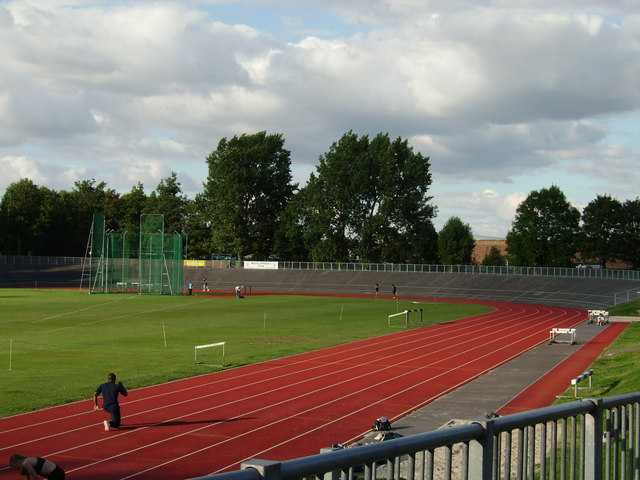
- The stadium in 2007
- Interactive map of Harvey Hadden Stadium
- Full name: Harvey Hadden Stadium
- Location: Wigman Road, Bilborough, Nottingham, Nottinghamshire; NG8 4PB
- Coordinates: 52.968°N 1.216°W
- Operator: Nottingham City Council
- Capacity: 1600 (740 seated)

Construction
- Built: 1959
- Renovated: 2014
- Expanded: 1970s

Tenants
- Nottingham Caesars (1984–2014, 2016–2021); Notts Athletics Club / Nottingham Trent University Athletic Club; University of Nottingham Athletic Club; Nottingham City RLFC (1989-1993); Nottingham Outlaws ?-2013

Harvey Hadden Stadium is a purpose-built athletics stadium in the Bilborough district of Nottingham, England. It is the home of Notts Athletics Club (who compete in the Premier Division of the National Athletics League and Midland Counties Athletics League), as well as both the Athletic clubs of Nottingham Trent University and the University of Nottingham. It was used as the home ground for Nottingham Caesars from 1984 to 2021.

It is also used for other sporting events such as American football, Football, Boxing, MMA and Rugby league.

== Facilities ==
The stadium is currently operated by Nottingham City Council.

The separate complex facility holds a Gym, Activity Rooms, Sports Hall and Indoor Athletics area. The Stadium is built into an embankment and has a total capacity of 1600 in which all are housed in the Main Stand. The stand holds a seated capacity of 740 with room for another 800 spectators on a standing terrace on either sides. Opposite the Main Stand there is a slip road coming from the access road to allow a port of call for Emergency vehicles. The Stadium has the usual amenities including Food Kiosks and Bathroom facilities, but Player changing rooms are housed in the main complex building.

The field has a Running Track, Pits and Shot put nets surrounding a sports field.

== Sports ==
=== Athletics ===
Harvey Hadden stadium is the home of Notts Athletics club (est. 1928), who compete in the Premier Division of the National Athletics League and are the largest club in the East Midlands. Despite having to compete against many London clubs that pay their athletes, the club was able to finish 9th, 11th, and 12th in the 2021, 2022, and 2023 seasons, ensuring Premiership survival each year.

=== Cycling ===
Harvey Hadden stadium is host to a purpose build paved cycling closed circuit, that's 1500m in length The circuit hosts criteriums, as well as, training sessions for local clubs. The circuit was opened in mid-2015 and held its first race in summer 2016

=== Rugby League ===
The Harvey Hadden Stadium was a former home to the semi-professional Nottingham City RLFC from 1989 until 1993 when the club folded. For a number of years, it was the home of Nottingham Outlaws an amateur rugby league side.

=== American football ===
From 1984 until 2014, the stadium housed home games for the city's American football club, the Nottingham Caesars. During the renovation of the stadium in 2014 the club vacated but returned in time for the 2016 season. The ground is fully equipped with original American football posts as opposed to Rugby posts which is a common site in the British League. The Caesars training field lies adjacent to the Main Stand.
