= Harold Reckitt =

British politician

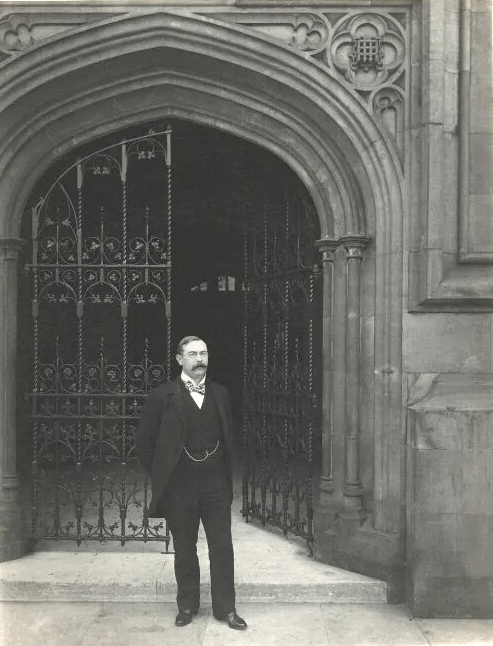
Harold Reckitt, 1897 photograph

Sir Harold James Reckitt JP MP (5 May 1868 – 29 December 1930) was a British Liberal Party politician. He was the Member of Parliament (MP) for Pontefract from February to June, 1893. He was MP for Brigg from 1895 to 1907.

== Background and education ==
He was born the eldest son of Sir James Reckitt and Kathleen Saunders. He was the grandson of Isaac Reckitt (1792–1862), the founder of Reckitt & Sons consumer goods business. He was educated at Oliver's Mount School, Scarborough and King's College, Cambridge. In 1892 he qualified as a Barrister. In 1899 he married Christine Thomazia Howden in Kensington, they were divorced. In 1908 he married Julia Conner.

== Political service ==
Reckitt in 1895

In 1892 Reckitt was appointed a Justice of the Peace for the East Riding of Yorkshire. In 1892 he first stood for parliament as Liberal candidate for Thirsk & Malton at the general election, coming second. In February 1893, he was Liberal candidate in the by-election caused by the Tory MP going to the Lords. He gained the seat by 63 votes. However, in May, following a petition organised by his defeated opponent, the election was ruled void and Reckitt was prevented from contesting the June by-election. In December 1894 he was Liberal candidate for Brigg at a by-election. He was unable to hold this Liberal seat, losing by 77 votes.
In August 1895 at the general election, he re-gained Brigg from the Tories. In 1897 he became Secretary of the political committee of the National Liberal Club as part of a take-over by the radicals. In 1898-99 he served as Sheriff of Hull. He went on to retain Brigg at the general elections in 1900 and 1906. In January 1907 he resigned his seat.

During the First World War in 1915, with Lady Johnstone, he founded a military hospital in France in Ris-Orangis called "Hôpital Militaire Johnstone-Reckitt". The hospital was closed after the war but a street named "Rue Johnstone et Reckitt" still exists in Ris-Orangis.

In 1924, after a break of eighteen years, he was Liberal candidate for Shoreditch at the general election. In a straight fight with Labour he came second, losing by 1,860 votes. In 1929 he again contested Shoreditch but on this occasion a Tory intervened. Reckitt came a comfortable second, but some distance behind the Labour candidate.

=== Electoral record ===
General election 1892: Thirsk and Malton
Party	Candidate	Votes	%	±%
Conservative	John Lawson	5,890	62.5	n/a
Liberal	Harold James Reckitt	3,541	37.5	n/a
Majority		2,349	25.0	n/a
Turnout		9,431	77.2	n/a
Registered electors		12,220		
Conservative hold				

February 1893 Pontefract by-election
Party	Candidate	Votes	%	±%
Liberal	Harold James Reckitt	1,228	51.3	+2.2
Conservative	John Reginald Shaw	1,165	48.7	−2.2
Majority		63	2.6	4.4
Turnout		2,393	92.9	+4.6
Registered electors		2,575		
Liberal gain from Conservative		Swing	+2.2	

1894 Brigg by-election
Party	Candidate	Votes	%	±%
Conservative	John Maunsell Richardson	4,377	50.4	+2.9
Liberal	Harold James Reckitt	4,300	49.6	−2.9
Majority		77	0.8	n/a
Turnout		8,677	82.8	+0.9
Registered electors		10,478		
Conservative gain from Liberal		Swing	+2.9	

General election 1895: Brigg
Party	Candidate	Votes	%	±%
Liberal	Harold James Reckitt	4,886	54.3	+1.8
Conservative	John Maunsell Richardson	4,110	45.7	−1.8
Majority		776	8.6	+3.6
Turnout		8,996	77.2	−4.7
Registered electors		11,656		
Liberal hold		Swing	+1.8	

General election 1900: Brigg
Party	Candidate	Votes	%	±%
Liberal	Harold James Reckitt	4,899	54.6	+0.3
Conservative	George Herbert Peake	4,077	45.4	−0.3
Majority		822	9.2	+0.6
Turnout		8,976	83.8	+6.6
Registered electors		10,713		
Liberal hold		Swing	+0.3	

General election 1906: Brigg
Party	Candidate	Votes	%	±%
Liberal	Harold James Reckitt	5,753	58.8	+4.2
Conservative	Geoffrey Henry Julian Skeffington Smyth	4,027	41.2	−4.2
Majority		1,726	17.6	+8.4
Turnout		9,780	83.3	−0.5
Registered electors		11,737		
Liberal hold		Swing	+4.2	

General election 1924: Shoreditch
Party	Candidate	Votes	%	±%
Labour	Ernest Thurtle	16,608	53.0	−3.6
Liberal	Harold James Reckitt	14,748	47.0	+3.6
Majority		1,860	6.0	−7.2
Turnout		31,356	59.5	+12.1
Labour hold		Swing	−3.6	

General election 1929: Shoreditch
Party	Candidate	Votes	%	±%
Labour	Ernest Thurtle	20,552	51.5	−1.5
Liberal	Harold James Reckitt	12,981	32.6	−13.6
Unionist	Antony Bulwer-Lytton	6,334	15.9	n/a
Majority		7,571	18.9	+12.9
Turnout		39,867	64.3	+4.8
Labour hold		Swing	+6.4	

== See also ==
- Reckitt baronets

Parliament of the United Kingdom
Preceded by Rowland Winn	Member of Parliament for Pontefract; Feb 1893 – Jun 1893	Succeeded by Sir Thomas Willans Nussey
Preceded by John Maunsell Richardson	Member of Parliament for Brigg; 1895 – 1907	Succeeded by Berkeley Sheffield
Baronetage of the United Kingdom
Preceded by James Reckitt	Baronet (of Swanland Manor); 1924 – 1930	Succeeded by Philip Bealby Reckitt
