= Percy Cowley =

Percy Cowley CBE, JP

First Deemster and Clerk of the Rolls
- In office 1947–1958
- Appointed by: George VI
- Preceded by: Reginald Douglas Farrant
- Succeeded by: Sydney James Kneale

Second Deemster
- In office 1934–1947
- Preceded by: Reginald Douglas Farrant
- Succeeded by: Ramsey Gelling Johnson

High Bailiff of Ramsey and Peel
- In office 1925–1931
- Preceded by: William Lay
- Succeeded by: William Lay (of Isle of Man)

Personal details
- Born: 26 July 1886 Ramsey, Isle of Man
- Died: 13 January 1958 (aged 71) London
- Resting place: Lezayre, Isle of Man
- Spouse: Emily Alison Martin (m. 1914; died 1927) Ethel Muriel Kissack (m. 1929)
- Children: 2, including Denis
- Committees: War Consultative Committee

Military service
- Branch/service: Royal Naval Volunteer Reserve
- Years of service: 1918–1919
- Rank: Paymaster Sub-Lieutenant

Sir William Percy Cowley, CBE, JP (26 July 1886 – 13 January 1958) was a Manx lawyer and judge. He was First Deemster and Clerk of the Rolls from 1947 until his death.

== Biography ==
The son of Robert Cowley, a member of the House of Keys, Percy Cowley was educated at Ramsey Grammar School. He was called to the Manx bar in 1909. During the First World War, he served as Royal Naval Volunteer Reserve as a Paymaster-Sub-Lieutenant and was on the staff of the Commander-in-Chief, Mediterranean Fleet from 1918 to 1919.

He was High Bailiff of Ramsey and Peel from 1925 until 1931, the year he was appointed a justice of the peace. He was Second Deemster from 1934 to 1947, when he became First Deemster and Clerk of the Rolls. At the time of his death, he was concurrently Deputy Lieutenant-Governor.

During the Second World War, Cowley was the chairman of the Tynwald's War Consultative Committee. He was chairman of the Manx Blind Welfare Society, the Merchant Navy Society, and the Ramsey Cottage Hospital.

He was appointed CBE in 1945, knighted in 1952, and was made a freeman of Douglas in 1956.

A son was the barrister and judge Denis Martin Cowley QC.
