= Scunthorpe Alphas =

American Football team based in the United Kingdom

- Founded: 2018
- Dissolved: 2026
- League: BAFA National Leagues
- Location: Scunthorpe, North Lincolnshire, England
- Stadium: Quibell Park Stadium
- Colours: White Helmets; Navy Blue and White Jerseys; Navy Blue pants White socks
- Division titles: 2022, 2024
- Playoff berths: 2022, 2023, 2024, 2025

The Scunthorpe Alphas were an American football club based in Scunthorpe, North Lincolnshire, England that competed in the BAFA National Leagues from 2019 until 2025. The club played their home games at Quibell Park Stadium and were formed in late 2018 by a consortium of coaches and former players who had previously played together at other local sides. In formation the Alphas became the second American football team to represent Scunthorpe following the Steelers who folded in 1990. The club were successful, and made the play-offs in every competitive season they played in, earning promotion from Division Two to the Premiership within 3 years. In February 2026, the club announced they had merged with the Humber Warhawks.

== History ==
=== Associate process ===
The Alphas were formed in 2018 by a consortium of coaches and former players who had previous links to the Sheffield Giants, Lincolnshire Bombers and Doncaster Mustangs, namely founding members Warwick Grosvenor, Alex Robson, Nick Tomaszewski, Mikey Gray and Iain Heron Stamp.

The club had become the first team to represent Scunthorpe since the 'Scunthorpe Steelers' who folded in 1990. The Alphas added American quarterback Derek Yenerall, formerly of Premier League team Bristol Aztecs to their roster for their debut season and played their first game against Etone Jaguars (formerly Coventry Jets) on the 3 August 2019, losing 16–12 in Nuneaton. The Alphas brought American Football back to Quibell Park Stadium for the first time in 19 years when they hosted the Northants Knights on 15 September 2019, in attendance was a crowd of over 400 people.

In February 2020 in preparation for their second season, the Alphas appointed former NCAA LSU Tigers player William Walker Jnr as their new Offensive Line coach. Walker had played under Louis Oubre at McDonogh High School and alongside future NFL players Joe McKnight and Delvin Breaux.

=== Division Two ===
The Alphas were made full BAFA members in October 2020. BAFA representative Warren Smart commented "BAFA believes that General Manager (GM) Warwick Grosvenor, aided by Assistant GM Nick Tomaszewski and the Alphas management and coaching squad, has established a sustainable, dynamic and competitive club".

The Alphas made their debut in part of the makeshift 2021 season, with BAFA announcing that the three-tier format would be suspended for one season and replaced by a localised division in order to minimize travel. Scunthorpe were placed in the BAFA Central East with the Nottingham Caesars, Lincolnshire Bombers, Northants Knights and South Lincs Lightning. The Alphas won their debut BAFANL game with a 10–3 victory over the Lincolnshire Bombers with Deivydas Merkelis scoring Scunthorpe's first ever League touchdown.

In 2022 won they NFC 2 South with a 8–0 record before defeating Darlington Steam in the play-off quarter finals, which they won 23–6. The Alphas were eventually defeated in the semi-finals away at the Highland Stags in Invergordon losing 18–8, but were promoted to Division 1 for 2023 as the second placed team in the North.

=== Division 1 to the Premiership ===
In 2023 the Alphas started their regular season with a loss away at the Northumberland Vikings 24–13. The Alphas would go on to beat the Lancashire Wolverines, Darlington Steam and the Yorkshire Rams twice. The Alphas ultimately faltered at home to the Vikings 28–0. An 8–2 regular season in their first year in Division 1 would result in two consecutive playoff berths. The Alphas won their first Division 1 playoff game 23–13 away at the Glasgow Tigers on 20 August 2023 before being defeated by the Nottingham Caesars ending their Premier Division promotion bid.

In 2024 the club were re-aligned into the NFC 1 North with the Yorkshire Rams, Sheffield Giants, Chester Romans and the Humber Warhawks. Finishing with a 6-2 record they clinched the divisional title and secured a play-off game against Shropshire Revolution.

They were promoted to the Premiership North in 2025 despite finishing Northern runners up to Merseyside Nighthawks, but in February 2026 ahead of their debut campaign in the top flight they announced they would be merging with the Humber Warhawks, and taking up the Warhawks spot in Division 2.

== Youth team ==
The Alphas introduced several levels of Youth team football in 2020 and in turn appointed former Great Britain Lions youth coach Richard Scott as their new U19 Head Coach. The Alphas will also run a U16 team with coaches Ryan McEntee and Patrick Galvin on board to work under coach Scott.

In 2022, Scunthorpe Alphas saw the selection of 2 members of the Scunthorpe Alphas selected to represent the Great Britain U17s Team in LT Dominic Norbron and WR Jay Robinson.

== Stadium ==
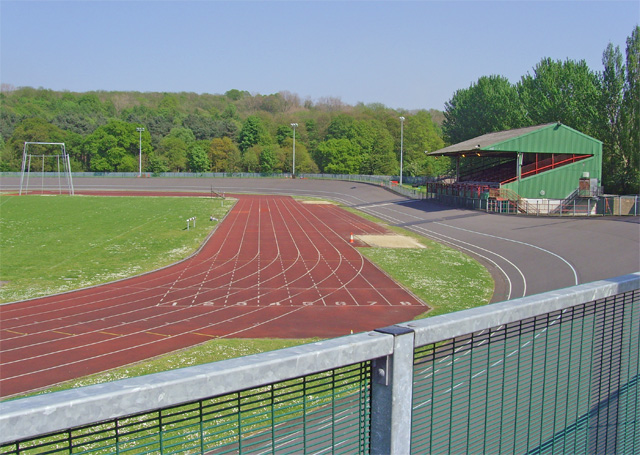
Quibell Park Stadium

The Alphas play their home games at Quibell Park Stadium, the former home of the Steelers. Quibell Park is a purpose-built athletics and cycling velodrome stadium that has an American football field in the centre. The Alphas also use the adjacent field for practice making the Quibell Park complex their home for both training and match days.

== Season records ==
Season	League	Level	Regular Season Record			Post Season	Notes
Season	League	Level	Wins	Losses	Ties	Post Season	Notes
2019	BAFANL Associate Process	4	0	5	0	–	All games Exhibitions to gain BAFANL entry
2020	BAFANL Associate Process	4	0	0	0	–	Season cancelled due to COVID-19 Pandemic; Achieved BAFANL status
2021	BAFANL Central East Division	–	3	5	0	–	Exhibition season due to COVID-19 Pandemic
2022	BAFANL NFC2 South	3	8	0	0	1–1	Divisional champions, Promoted to Division 1
2023	BAFANL NFC1 Central	2	8	2	0	1-1	Divisional runners-up, Beaten in Play-off semi-finals
2024	BAFANL NFC1 North	2	6	2	0	1-0	Divisional champions, Beaten in Play-off semi-finals
2025	BAFANL NFC1 North	2	6	2	0	2-1	Northern Runners up, Promoted to the Premier Division
2026	BAFANL Premiership North	1	0	0	0	N/A	Club folded after season schedule announced
Total			32	16	0	All-time regular season record	

== Honours ==
- BAFA National Leagues : NFC 2 South Champions - 2022
- BAFA National Leagues : NFC 1 North Champions - 2024
