= Michael Hunter (politician) =

British Member of Parliament

Michael John Hunter (15 July 1891 – 9 March 1951) was a British Member of Parliament.

Born at Stoke Hall in Calver, in Derbyshire, Hunter was educated at Rugby School and Clare College, Cambridge. During World War I, he served with the Royal Field Artillery, becoming a captain.

Hunter stood for the Conservative Party in Brigg at the 1931 United Kingdom general election and was elected, but he lost his seat at the 1935 United Kingdom general election.

In 1951, Hunter was taking part in a hunt, when he was killed in an accident, aged 59.

Parliament of the United Kingdom
Preceded by David Quibell	Member of Parliament for Brigg; 1931–1935	Succeeded by David Quibell
