= Tom Williamson, Baron Williamson =

British trade unionist and Labour politician (1897–1983)

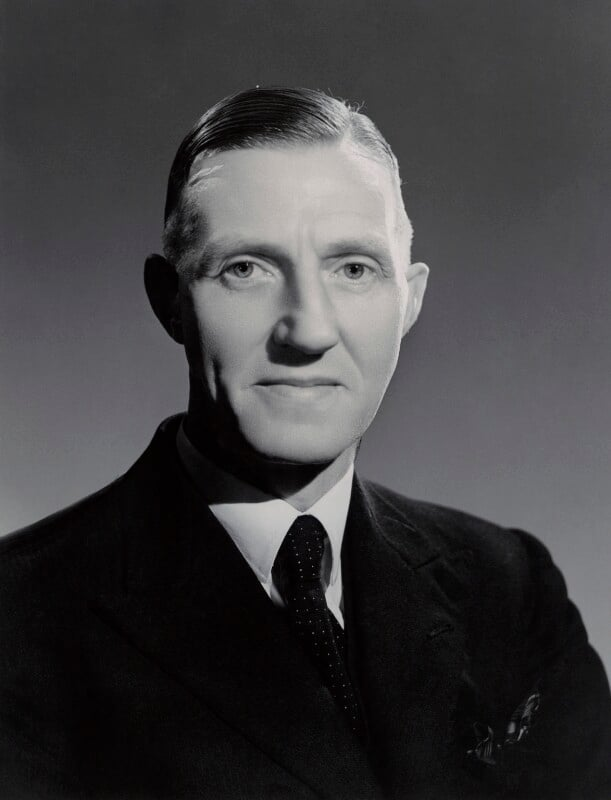
Williamson in 1946

Thomas Williamson, Baron Williamson, CBE, JP (2 September 1897 – 27 February 1983) was a British trade unionist and Labour Party politician.

Williamson was born in St. Helens, Lancashire. His father was a glassblower, and Tom began his career working in the office of his father's union, the National Amalgamated Union of Labour. He became a full-time union delegate, and in 1924, when it became part of the National Union of General and Municipal Workers (NUGMW), he was appointed as a district secretary. He became interested in politics at age 9, when his father took him to see Tom Mann speak. During the First World War, he served with the Royal Engineers.

He married Hilda Hartley in 1925. The couple had one daughter.

He first foray into politics was serving on the Liverpool City Council from 1929 to 1935. At the 1945 general election, he was elected as Member of Parliament (MP) for the Brigg constituency in Lincolnshire. He resigned his seat in 1948, and the resulting by-election was won by Labour's Lance Mallalieu.

In 1937, he became the industrial officer of NUGMW, and served as its General Secretary from 1946 to 1961. He was also President of the Trades Union Congress from 1957 to 1958. He was a founding member of the British Productivity Council.

Williamson was appointed a Commander of the Order of the British Empire (CBE) in 1950, and was knighted in 1956.

Williamson was created a life peer on 15 May 1962, with the title Baron Williamson, of Eccleston in the Borough of St. Helens in the County Palatine of Lancaster.

He died in a Cheshire nursing home in 1983, aged 85.

== Coat of Arms ==
Coat of arms of Lord Williamson

Crest
Out of a mural crown sable masoned argent a pelican proper supporting a caduceus
Escutcheon
Per saltire gules and sable three arms conjoined at the shoulder and flexed in a triangle each hand proper grasping a hammer or, over all a sun in splendour gold
Supporters
On either side a secretary bird proper in their beaks a square buckle gules
Motto
Quantum sufficit ("A sufficient quantity")

Parliament of the United Kingdom
| Preceded by David Quibell | Member of Parliament for Brigg; 1945–1948 | Succeeded by Lance Mallalieu |
Trade union offices
| Preceded by Mark Hewitson | President of the International Federation of Unions of Employees in Public and Civil Services; 1939–1956 | Succeeded by Adolph Kummernuss |
| Preceded by Charles Dukes | General Secretary of the National Union of General and Municipal Workers; 1946–1961 | Succeeded by Jack Cooper |
| Preceded by Herbert Bullock and William Harold Hutchinson | Trades Union Congress representative to the American Federation of Labour; 1949; With: Lincoln Evans | Succeeded by Florence Hancock and Will Lawther |
| Preceded by Wilfred Beard | President of the Trades Union Congress; 1957–1958 | Succeeded by Tom Yates |
