= C. W. W. McLean =

British politician

Charles Wesley Weldon McLean
- Born: August 1882; Saint John, New Brunswick
- Died: 5 September 1962 (aged 80)
- Relatives: Hugh Havelock McLean (father)
- Military career
- Allegiance: United Kingdom
- Branch: British Army
- Rank: Colonel
- Commands: 52 Brigade Royal Horse Artillery
- Conflicts: Second Boer War; World War I
- Awards: Distinguished Service Order & Two Bars

Member of Parliament for Brigg
- In office 14 December 1918 – 26 October 1922
- Preceded by: Alfred Gelder
- Succeeded by: Berkeley Sheffield

Colonel Charles Wesley Weldon McLean, DSO & Two Bars (August 1882 – 5 September 1962) was a Canadian soldier and politician.

== Early life ==
MacLean was born in Saint John, New Brunswick in 1882. His father, Brigadier General Hugh Havelock McLean, was a lawyer and politician who served as Lieutenant-Governor of New Brunswick, Canada from 1928 to 1933. He was educated at the Royal Military College of Canada in Kingston, Ontario from 1897 to 1899.

== Career ==
MacLean began his military career as a lieutenant in the Canadian Non-Permanent Active Militia, and on 7 March 1900 received a commission in the British Army as a second lieutenant in the Royal Artillery. He saw active service in the Second Boer War in South Africa from 1899 to 1901.

During World War I, Major MacLean commanded the 52 Brigade Royal Horse Artillery, 9th (Scottish) Division, British Army. He was awarded a Distinguished Service Order (DSO) in 1915, a bar in 1917 "for conspicuous gallantry and devotion to duty. He has commanded his battery with great skill and courage. He has observed fire and commanded the battery from an observation post under heavy fire with great coolness and accuracy." and a second bar in the same gazette.

He remained in England after the War. Standing as a Coalition Conservative, he was elected at the 1918 general election as the member of parliament (MP) for the Brigg division of Lincolnshire, but did not stand again at the 1922 general election.

Correspondence related to his service in artillery and as MP are in the Imperial War Museum, Department of Documents. He died in 1962 aged 80.

Parliament of the United Kingdom
Preceded by Sir (William) Albert Gelder	Member of Parliament for Brigg; 1918 – 1922	Succeeded by Sir Berkeley Sheffield, Bt
