= Berkeley Sheffield =

British politician (1876–1946)

Sir Berkeley Sheffield MP

Sir Berkeley Digby George Sheffield, 6th Baronet, DL (19 January 1876 – 26 November 1946) was a British Member of Parliament for the Conservative Party.

== Background ==
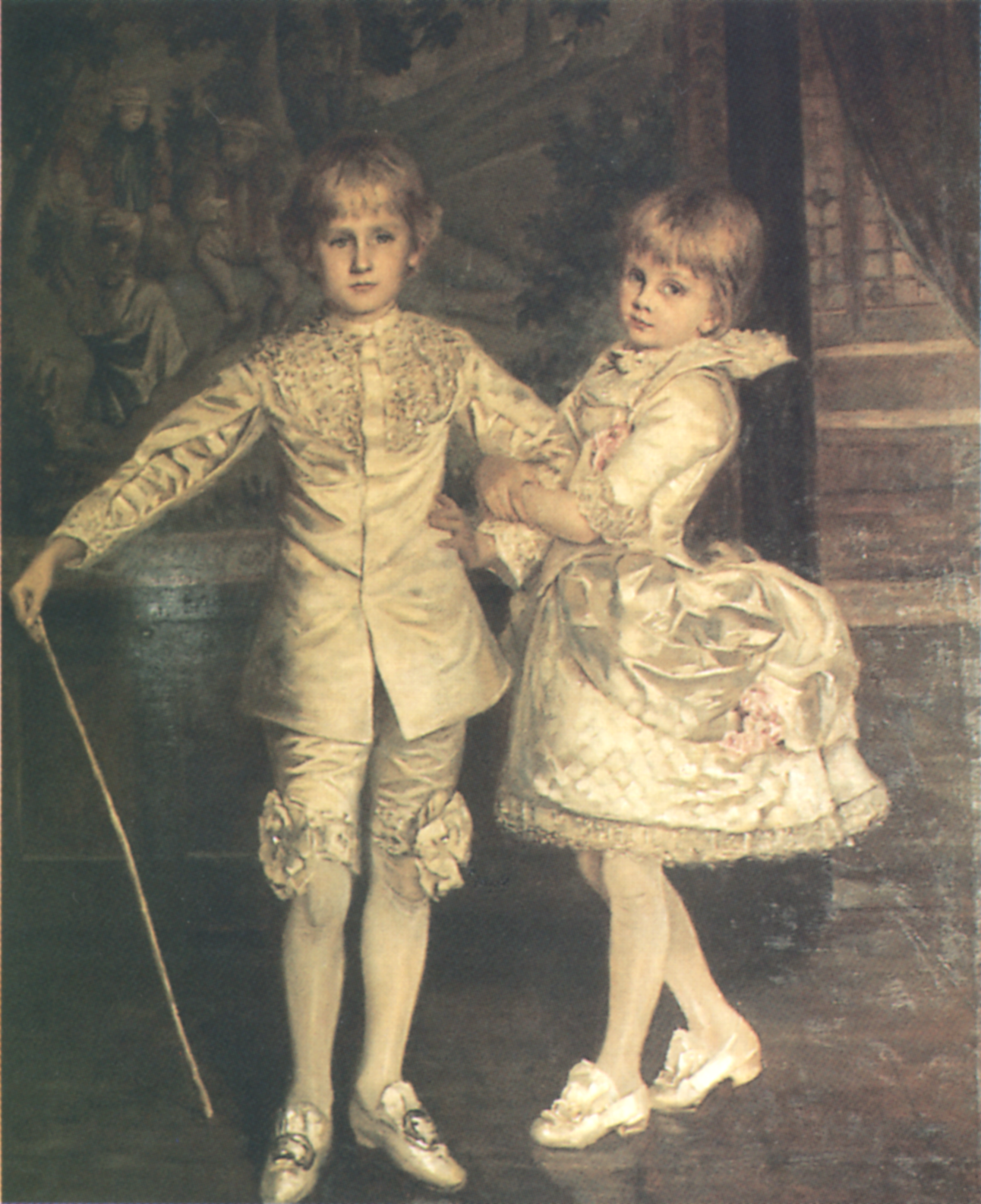
Berkeley with his sister Dorothy in a painting by Sarah Purser which was exhibited in 1885 at the Royal Academy of Arts

He was born in London, the son of Sir Robert Sheffield, 5th Baronet, of Normanby Hall, whom he succeeded as Baronet in 1886. Sheffield was educated at Eton College and in France and Germany. He served with the Lincolnshire Regiment and in the Yeomanry, with the Diplomatic Service and in the Foreign Office. On 19 July 1904 he married Dutch Baroness Julie Marie (Julia Mary) de Tuyll van Serooskerken, born at The Hague, daughter of Baron Reginald de Tuyll van Serooskerken and wife Countess Anna Mathilda van Limburg-Stirum (alleged illegitimate daughter of William III of the Netherlands); Lady Sheffield was an Officer of the Most Excellent Order of the British Empire and a Lady of Grace of the Most Venerable Order of the Hospital of Saint John of Jerusalem. They had one daughter and four sons, including George Berkeley Sheffield.

During the First World War he served as a captain in the Lincolnshire Yeomanry.

Sheffield was a director of Great Central Railway from 1908 until it was combined with the London and North Eastern Railway in 1923. Postwar, he was member of Parliament for Brigg between 1922 and 1929. He was a Justice of the Peace in Lincolnshire. He was Mayor of Scunthorpe in 1936 and he was Deputy Lieutenant of Lincolnshire.

He lived at 8 South Audley Street in London, and was a member of the Turf Club, the Jockey Club, the Orleans Club and the Beefsteak Club.

Sheffield is one of the great-great-grandfathers of Cara Delevingne and is great-grandfather of Samantha Cameron.

== Political career ==
Sheffield was a member of Lindsey County Council from 1902 to 1906 and an alderman from 1908 to 1915. He was High Sheriff of Lincolnshire in 1905. In February 1907 he was elected to Parliament for the Brigg division of Lincolnshire; he was defeated at the February 1910 election. Re-elected for Brigg in 1922, he sat until defeated in May 1929. When Scunthorpe was granted its charter as a municipal borough in 1936, Sheffield was the borough's first mayor.

Parliament of the United Kingdom
Preceded by Harold Reckitt	Member of Parliament for Brigg; 1907 – Jan. 1910	Succeeded by Sir Alfred Gelder
Preceded by C. W. W. McLean	Member of Parliament for Brigg; 1922 – 1929	Succeeded by David Quibell
Baronetage of Great Britain
Preceded by Robert Sheffield	Baronet (of Normanby); 1886–1946	Succeeded by Robert Arthur Sheffield
