= Quibell Park Stadium =

Multi-purpose stadium in North Lincolnshire

Coordinates: 53.583322°N 0.677511°W

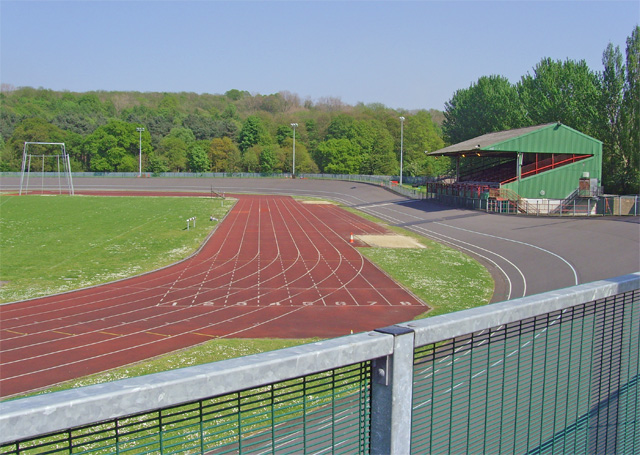
- Quibell Park Stadium in 2008
- Interactive map of Quibell Park Stadium
- Location: Brumby Wood Lane, Scunthorpe, North Lincolnshire, DN17 1SR
- Operator: North Lincolnshire Council

Construction
- Built: 1964
- Opened: 1965
- Renovated: 2013

Tenants
- Scunthorpe Steelers (1984–1990); Scunthorpe Alphas (2019–2025)

Quibell Park Stadium is a multi-purpose stadium in Scunthorpe, North Lincolnshire, owned by North Lincolnshire Council, primarily used for athletics, cycling, and American football. The stadium consists of an outdoor velodrome, an athletics track, and a sports field. It was the home stadium for the Scunthorpe Alphas American football team who played in the BAFA National Leagues.

== History ==
The area was first opened as a showground and park in 1949 by the Duke and Duchess of Gloucester. It was named Quibell Park after Labour Party politician David Quibell, 1st Baron Quibell. In 1965, the stadium was opened.

Speedway in Scunthorpe began on 3 May 1971 at the Quibell Park Stadium and a team known as the Scunthorpe Saints raced at the stadium from 1971 to 1978.

During 1978, the relationship between the athletics club, Scunthorpe Borough council and the speedway team deteriorated, over issues about the track conditions. Promoter Brian Osborn was eventually forced to find a new home at Ashby Ville Stadium for the 1979 season.

In 2008, the stadium was chosen as a possible training venue for the 2012 Summer Olympics. The stadium is surrounded by a velodrome.

== See also ==
- List of cycling tracks and velodromes
