= David Quibell, 1st Baron Quibell =

British politician and contractor

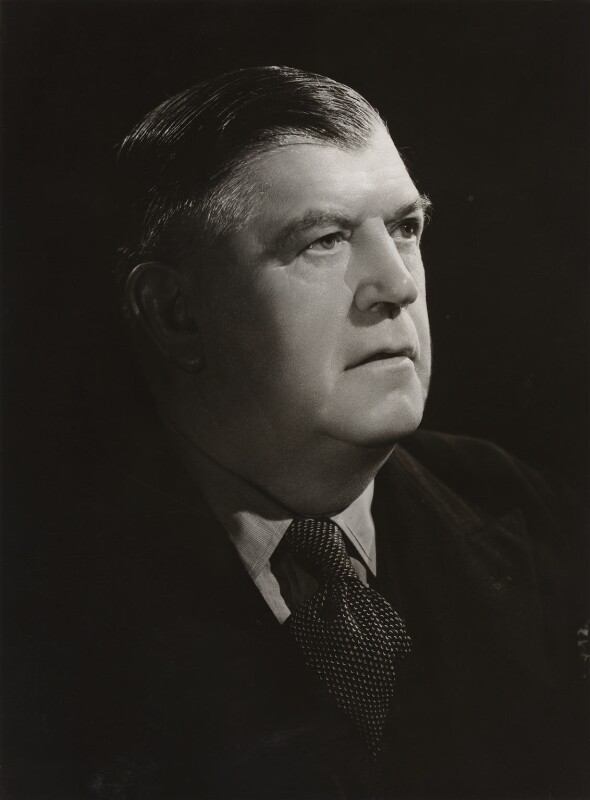
Quibell

David John Kinsley Quibell, 1st Baron Quibell (21 December 1879 – 16 April 1962) was a British builder, contractor and Labour Party politician.

== Background and education ==
David John Kinsley Quibell was the first born child of David John Quibell (1858-1927) and Rebecca Edlington Kinsley (1861-1880), of Messingham, Lincolnshire, and was educated at the Messingham Church of England School in Lincolnshire. He worked as a builder and contractor.

== Political career ==
Quibell was elected Member of Parliament for Brigg in Lincolnshire at the 1929 general election. He lost his seat two years later, when Labour split over the decision of its leader, Ramsay MacDonald, to form a National Government, but was re-elected at the 1935 general election. He was a signatory to "Post-war Forest Policy" published by the Forestry Commission in 1943. He retired from the House of Commons at the 1945 general election, when he was elevated to the peerage as Baron Quibell, of Scunthorpe in the County of Lincoln, in recognition of his "political and public services". In 1953 he was Mayor of Scunthorpe. He started his political life as a Trades Union leader and by 1910 was Secretary ILP. He also had a long-standing friendship with Winston Churchill was a Freeman of Scunthorpe and a Freeman of City of London, the first Lincolnshire man to qualify.

== Personal life ==
Lord Quibell was twice married. He married as his first wife Edith Jane (1881-1953), daughter of John Foster, in 1900. After her death in March 1953 he married as his second wife Catherine Cameron Rae (1896-1989), daughter of John C. Rae, in 1954 at The Queen's Chapel of St John the Baptist, The Savoy, Westminster, London. He died in April 1962, aged 83, whereupon the barony became extinct.

"The Quibell Story" by Edward Dodd published by Caldicotts Ltd. Scunthorpe and Gainsborough 15s details David John Kinsley Quibell's life, saying his forebears had wrested a living from the land for four hundred years in the Messingham district of Lincolnshire. "The Quibell story reveals an almost fanatical urge for an improvement of conditions of every description - wages, housing, health, education, with particular interest in the conditions of the agricultural labourers and blast furnace men. The fact that he was a man of the soil always stood him in good stead a man with prodigious memory, ready wit that had been sharpened by his early life, a power of invective and repartee, above all his great zeal for social justice."

After his death, Quibell's daughter Edith Ellen Bennard (1904-2000) was unsuccessful in claiming her father's title. "An industrial tribunal in London decided yesterday it could not give a verdict in the case of a peer's daughter who claims her father's title under the Sex Discrimination Act; Mrs Edith Ellen Bennard, aged 72, must take her claim to the Sovereign. Mrs. Bennard claims that she had been "discriminated against on grounds of sex" when she was prevented from taking the House of Lords seat of her father, the late Lord Quibell. In her application under the Equal Opportunities Act, Mrs. Bennard, who was not in court, had argued that attending Parliament and receiving the daily minimum allowance of 13.50 pounds amounted to employment. The tribunal decided there was no salary and none of the characteristics of a contract of employment in attending the Lords. "There is no provision that could terminate the so-called employment if an employer thought the work being carried out was unsatisfactory."

== Obituaries ==
Lord Quibell outspoken Labour Peer, The Times - "Lord Quibell for many years a staunch servant of the Labour Party died last night at his home in Scunthorpe. He was 82. The Right Hon, David John Kinsley Quibell, first Baron Quibell of Scunthorpe, in the County of Lincoln, in the Peerage of the United Kingdom, was born on 21 December 1879. Though not given to boasting about his success in life, he was never secretive regarding his humble beginnings. His only education, he would remind his critics, had been acquired in an elementary school, from which, when still a boy, he had gone to work on a farm. His next job was in a brickyard, but he did not remain long, leaving to be-come apprenticed to bricklaying. Having learned his trade, he was for some years a journeyman bricklayer, working to such purpose that within a few years he set up for himself as a builder and contractor in his native town of Scunthorpe. He continued to take an active interest in his business throughout his public career. Proud of his skill as a bricklayer, he had little patience with the restrictive practices which stipulated the number of bricks a skilled tradesman should be allowed to lay and not infrequently clashed with trade union colleagues on the subject. Yet he was much concerned about the conditions and wages of the workers, and retained his union card long after he became an employer. Powerfully built, he never hesitated to say what he thought and in his early days was one of the most forceful propagandists of the Independent Labour Party. Though his speeches were usually spiced with humour he was generally more than a match for hecklers. He was for some years a member of Scunthorpe Union District Council, and first Labour Party member to become its chairman. He was also a member of the Lindsey County Council and a Justice of the Peace for Lindsey, Lincolnshire, and Flintshire and a past president of the Scunthorpe Co-operative Society. His determination to represent his own locality in Parliament was so strong that he contested the Brigg Division no fewer than six times, four without success. Eventually, in 1929, he secured election, but two years later his political career was interrupted, and he did not return to the House of Commons until 1935. He represented the constituency during the next 10 years, and was elevated to the Peerage in the Dissolution Honours in recognition of his political and public services. From 1942 to 1945 he was a member of the Forestry Commission. Of all the honours conferred upon him none gave him greater satisfaction than that which made him the first Freeman of his native borough of Scunthorpe. He was also Major of Scunthorpe in the Coronation Year of 1953. Quibell married first in 1901 Edith Jane daughter of J. Foster of Scunthorpe, by whom he had one daughter. His first wife died in 1953 and the following year he married secondly Catherine Cameron Rae."

A staunch Labour peer : The late Lord Quibell. (The Illustrated London News 28 April 1962 - Personalities of the week) - "The Right Hon. David John Kingsley Quibell, who was a forceful Labour supporter, died on 16 April, aged eighty-eight. He had been Major of Scunthorpe in 1953. His career is particularly remarkable as he was educated at an elementary school and then became apprenticed to a bricklayer and started his own business."

== Legacy ==
Quibell's contribution to the Scunthorpe area is remembered for Quibell Park in East Scunthorpe, a venue for the Scunthorpe Family Weekend. The park also contains a cycling stadium. the park was also the venue of the Scunthorpe speedway team from 1972 - 1979 before they moved to Ashby Ville Stadium, which has since been demolished and turned into the lakeside retail park

== Arms ==
Coat of arms of David Quibell, 1st Baron Quibell
Crest In front of a pair of dividers pilewise Or a trowel erect Argent hafted Gules. Escutcheon Per fess Vert and Argent in chief two garbs Or and in base an arch throughout Gules masoned Sable. Supporters Dexter a grey horse Proper, sinister a bulldog Proper collared Gules suspended thereom a bell Or. Motto Per Ardua Ad Palmas

Parliament of the United Kingdom
Preceded by Sir Berkeley Sheffield, Bt	Member of Parliament for Brigg; 1929–1931	Succeeded by Michael John Hunter
Preceded by Michael John Hunter	Member of Parliament for Brigg; 1935–1945	Succeeded by Tom Williamson
Peerage of the United Kingdom
New creation	Baron Quibell; 1945–1962	extinct
