= Lance Mallalieu =

British politician (1905–79)

Sir Lance Mallalieu
- Mallalieu in 1933

First Deputy Chairman of Ways and Means
- In office 30 October 1973 – 28 February 1974
- Speaker: Selwyn Lloyd
- Preceded by: Betty Harvie Anderson
- Succeeded by: Oscar Murton

Second Deputy Chairman of Ways and Means
- In office 22 November 1971 – 30 October 1973
- Speaker: Selwyn Lloyd
- Preceded by: Office created
- Succeeded by: Oscar Murton

Member of Parliament for Brigg
- In office 24 March 1948 – 8 February 1974
- Preceded by: Tom Williamson
- Succeeded by: Constituency abolished

Member of Parliament for Colne Valley
- In office 27 October 1931 – 25 October 1935
- Preceded by: Philip Snowden
- Succeeded by: Ernest Marklew

Personal details
- Born: Edward Lancelot Mallalieu; 14 March 1905
- Died: 11 November 1979 (aged 74)
- Party: Labour
- Other political affiliations: Liberal
- Parent: Frederick Mallalieu (father)
- Education: Dragon School; Cheltenham College
- Alma mater: Trinity College, Oxford

Sir Edward Lancelot Mallalieu (14 March 1905 – 11 November 1979), known as Lance Mallalieu, was a British politician.

== Early life and career ==
Of Huguenot origin, a son of Frederick Mallalieu, a Member of Parliament, Mallalieu's ancestors had settled at Saddleworth in the early 1600s, where they lived in humble circumstances working as weavers. Frederick Mallalieu's father, Henry (1831–1902), was a self-made businessman, at the age of twelve a hand-loom weaver, but becoming a woolen manufacturer, chairman of ironworks companies, and the magistrate.

Lancelot Mallalieu was educated at the Dragon School, Oxford, Cheltenham College and Trinity College, Oxford.

== Political career ==
At the 1931 general election, Mallalieu was elected as the Liberal Party Member of Parliament (MP) for Colne Valley. His win was notable as it was a gain from Labour despite the presence of a Conservative candidate, unusual for 1931. His predecessor was the Labour Chancellor of the Exchequer Philip Snowden, who had decided to stand down. His father Frederick Mallalieu had been MP for the same seat from 1916 to 1922.

Mallalieu was a member of the main Liberal group in parliament led by Sir Herbert Samuel. He followed his leader into opposition in 1933. He served until the 1935 general election, when he lost his seat to Labour's Ernest Marklew.

After joining the Labour Party, he returned to the House of Commons in 1948, at a by-election on 24 March in the Brigg constituency, where he served as MP until he retired in 1974. From 1964 until 1970, he was Second Church Estates Commissioner. He was a Deputy Speaker of the Commons from 1971 to 1974.

Mallalieu was knighted in the 1979 Dissolution Honours.

== Family ==
Edward Mallalieu's brother, William, was Labour MP for Huddersfield from 1945 to 1950, then for Huddersfield East from 1950 to 1979. Sir William Mallalieu's daughter, Ann, has been a Labour life peer since 1991. His uncle, Albert Henry Mallalieu, was head of that family of Tan-y-Marian, Llandudno.

== Arms ==
Coat of arms of Lance Mallalieu
Notes Granted in 1920. Escutcheon Azure on a chevron Ermine between three fleurs-de-lis Argent four bezants on a chief Ermines a rose of the third barbed and seeded Proper. Motto Mal A Lui Qui Mal En Dit (Evil To Him Who Speaks Evil) Symbolism Fleurs-de-lis refer to Huguenot ancestry, motto cants on family name.

Parliament of the United Kingdom
Preceded by Philip Snowden	Member of Parliament for Colne Valley; 1931–1935	Succeeded by Ernest Marklew
Preceded by Thomas Williamson	Member of Parliament for Brigg; 1948–Feb 1974	Constituency abolished see Brigg & Scunthorpe
