= 1948 Brigg by-election =

UK Parliamentary by-election

The 1948 Brigg by-election was a by-election held on 24 March 1948 for the British House of Commons constituency of Brigg in Lincolnshire.

The by-election was triggered by the resignation of the constituency's Labour Party Member of Parliament (MP) Tom Williamson, a trade union leader who had held the seat since the 1945 general election.

The result was a victory for the Labour candidate Lance Mallalieu, who held the seat with a reduced majority, and represented Brigg until he retired from the House of Commons in 1974.

== Result ==
Brigg by-election, 1948
Party	Candidate	Votes	%	±%
Labour	Lance Mallalieu	27,333	54.58	−4.34
Conservative	Anthony Fell	22,746	45.42	+4.34
Majority		4,587	9.16	−8.68
Turnout		50,079	77.10	+0.50
Labour hold		Swing	−4.30	

== See also ==
- List of United Kingdom by-elections
- Wansbeck constituency
