= Alfred Gelder =

Alfred Gelder

Sir William Alfred Gelder FRS FRIBA (12 May 1855 – 26 August 1941) was a British architect and Liberal politician.

== Family and education ==
Gelder was born in the village of North Cave in the East Riding of Yorkshire, the son of William Gelder, a joiner and wheelwright who later became a timber merchant. Although christened William after his father, Gelder was known by his middle name, Alfred. It is not clear how much formal schooling Gelder received and at the age of 15 he was apprenticed to his father. However he changed his mind about following his father's trade and later became an architect. In 1877 he married Elizabeth Parker from Hull. They had two sons and a daughter. Elizabeth Gelder died in 1934 and Alfred did not remarry.

== Career ==
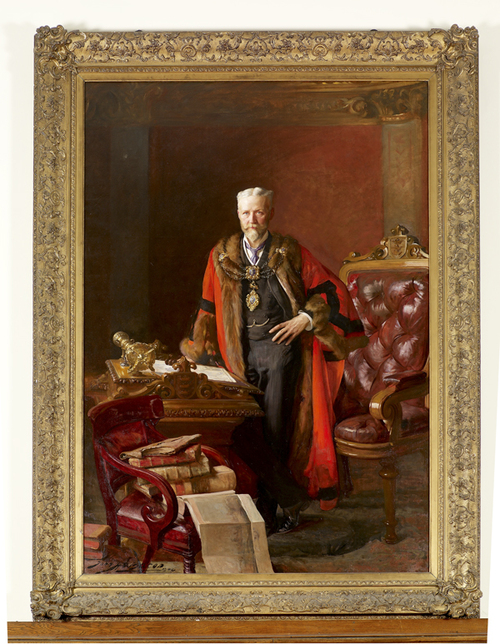
Gelder in 1904 in mayoral robes

Gelder wanted to be an architect and he went to Hull to seek out opportunities. He must have acquired some qualifications because in the year after his marriage to Elizabeth Parker he established an architectural practice. It is known that he gained a Bachelor of Arts degree and he later became a Fellow of the Royal Society as well as being a Fellow of the Royal Institute of British Architects. In 1892 he formed an association with Llewellyn Kitchen, the son of a commercial traveller from Manchester and set up the firm of Gelder and Kitchen in which he was the senior partner.

Gelder had entered the architectural profession at the time of the Victorian era development of Hull. According to one source it was largely thanks to Gelder's ability and energy that Hull was a city transformed – with old buildings removed, new wide streets introduced and attractive shops and public offices erected. Under Gelder's supervision, Hull was being hailed as one of the country's finest cities with the slums and disorder of the Victorian city giving way to broad, straight thoroughfares. During Gelder's time the city centre was reconstructed and a new bridge, the Drypool Bridge, was built across the River Hull. In recognition of Gelder's contributions, the new road built through the city centre to link with this bridge was named Alfred Gelder Street. In the 1930s Gelder was associated with the works to transform Queen's Dock into Queen's Gardens. One of Gelder and Kitchen's specialisms was the design of flour mills and oilseed crushing mills at a time when Hull was a major European centre for the industry. One of the firm's most famous clients for its revolutionary roller mill was Joseph Rank who, like Gelder, was a noted Methodist and Gelder also did architectural work for Joseph Rank's son, the industrialist and film producer, J Arthur Rank. His devout attachment to Methodism caused Gelder to design numerous chapels, including the Brunswick Chapel on Holderness Road in 1890 and the Princes Avenue Chapel in 1904. As well as in Hull, there were commissions for chapels and flour mills, from all over the country.

== Politics ==
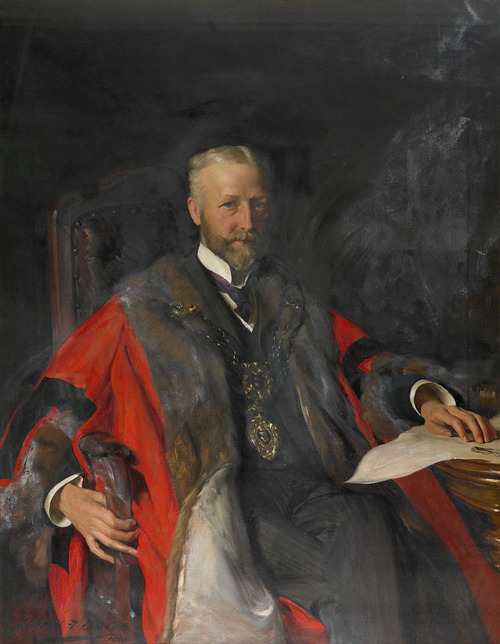
Gelder in 1904 in mayoral robes

Like many self-made men of non-conformist religion in Victorian and Edwardian England, Gelder gravitated to Liberal politics. In 1892 he became a member of the Hull School Board and three years later joined the City Council. From 1899–1903 Gelder was Liberal Mayor of Hull and in all was a member of the council, later in the office of Alderman, for 43 years. In 1930 he received the Honorary Freedom of the City. In 1910, Gelder was selected as Liberal candidate for Brigg in north Lincolnshire. Since its creation in 1885, Brigg had been mostly a Liberal seat but it had been lost to the Conservatives in a by-election in 1907 when the Liberal candidate was Frederick Guest. Guest was then selected to fight East Dorset and the Brigg constituency Liberals turned to Gelder as their candidate. He won the seat back from the Tories at the January 1910 general election, held it in December 1910 and represented the constituency until 1918 when he stood again as an Asquithian Independent Liberal and was beaten into third place behind the winning Coalition Conservative and the Labour candidate.

Gelder had resigned from Hull Council in 1912 but he was later elected an Alderman. By 1935 he was sitting as a member of the Independent Group and was the only one of the Independent Aldermen not to be voted off the Council by the incoming Labour administration.

== Honours and appointments ==
Gelder was knighted in the King's birthday honours list of 1903 for his services to architecture and to the City of Hull. This followed the visit to Hull during May 1903, when Gelder was Mayor of the city, by the Prince of Wales, accompanied by the Princess of Wales to unveil a memorial statue of Queen Victoria, a commemoration tablet at the Royal Infirmary and to lay the foundation stone of the new City Hall.

Parliament of the United Kingdom
| Preceded by Sir Berkeley Sheffield, Bt | Member of Parliament for Brigg; January 1910–1918 | Succeeded by Charles Wesley Weldon McLean |
