= Litherland (surname) =

Surname list

Litherland is a surname. Notable people with the surname include:

- Albert Edward Litherland (born 1928), British nuclear physicist
- Angus Litherland, now known as Angus Dewar (born 1992), Australian rules footballer
- Bob Litherland (1930–2011), British politician
- Geoff Diego Litherland (born 1979), British painter
- James Litherland (born 1949), British singer and guitarist
- Jay Litherland (born 1995), American swimmer
- Martin Litherland (born 1945), British geologist
- Matty Litherland (born 2005), English footballer
- Paul Litherland (born 1971), Australian police officer, cyber-safety educator and campaigner
- Peter Litherland (1756–1805), British watchmaker and inventor
