= Jestico + Whiles =

British architectural firm

Practice information
- Key architects: Tom Jestico + John Whiles (founding directors)
- Founded: 1977
- Location: London, EC1

Significant works and honors
- Buildings: The Hempel; Central School of Speech and Drama
- Awards: 2009, 2011 RIBA Awards

Jestico + Whiles is an architectural firm and interior design practice based in London, UK. It has completed a number of high-profile cultural, diplomatic, hotel and retail projects in Europe.

== The firm ==
Jestico + Whiles was founded by Tom Jestico and John Whiles in 1977. The practice is a trust, jointly owned by its staff. It is known particularly for its work on London boutique hotels such as The Hempel and One Aldwych. However, the firm has a diverse workload, and is also experienced in many other sectors including universities, schools and social housing.

The head office of Jestico + Whiles is at Sutton Yard, Goswell Road in Clerkenwell, London EC1V. It also has an office in Prague, Czech Republic. It has completed major projects across Europe, the Middle East and India. Its expertise includes urban regeneration, conservation of historic buildings and low-energy building techniques.

== Notable projects ==
Major projects, by year of completion and ordered by type, are:

Cultural and diplomatic

- 1993: The British Council, Madrid
- 2002: Diana, Princess of Wales Memorial Playground, London
- British Embassy, Latvia
- The British Council, Prague
- Embassy of the People's Republic of China, London
- 2009: Pitzhanger Manor, London

Education

- 2008: Mountbatten Building, ECS, University of Southampton, UK
- Central School of Speech and Drama, London
- Haberdashers' Knights Academy, London
- Davidson Building, Haberdashers' Hatcham College, London
- Stoke Newington School, London
- New Line Learning Kent, London
- National Graphene Institute, University of Manchester, Manchester

Hotels and restaurants

- The Hempel, London, UK
- 1999: One Aldwych, London
- 2001: Hakkasan, London
- 2007: Malmaison, Oxford Castle, UK – RICS Project of the Year
- 2009: Adriana Marina Hotel and Spa, Hvar, Croatia
- 2009: Andel's Hotel Prague, Czech Republic
- 2009: Andel's Hotel Berlin, Germany
- Andel's Hotel Kraków, Poland
- 2009: Andel's Hotel Łódź, Poland
- 2011: W Hotel, Leicester Square, London
- 2011: Aloft Hotel, ExCeL London

Residential

- 2000: House for the Future, St Fagans National History Museum, Cardiff
- 2005: Abbots Wharf, Bartlett Park, Tower Hamlets
- 2006: Tanner Street, Barking, London

Retail

- 2007: Old Spitalfields Market, London
- 2007: Fortnum & Mason, London

== Awards ==
- 2006: Housing Design Award for Abbotts Wharf
- 2009: RIBA Award for the Mountbatten Building, ECS, University of Southampton
- 2010: Contract Magazine, New York, Interior Design Award for Andel's Hotel Lodz
- 2011: highest-placed architects in the Sunday Times Green List
- 2011: RIBA Award for Stoke Newington School and Sixth Form
- 2024: Carbuncle Cup - Shortlisted for W Hotel, Edinburgh.

== See also ==
- List of architecture firms
- List of British architecture firms
