= Totnes Pride =

Annual LGBTQ+ event in Totnes, England

- Founded: 2013; 13 years ago
- Founders: Max and Maya Price (Proud2Be)
- Website: totnespride.uk

Totnes Pride is an annual LGBTQ pride event in the town of Totnes in Devon, England. Established in 2013 by Max and Maya Price's organisation Proud2Be, the event includes yearly pride parades, and in 2026 draped a 150-metre (490 ft) pride flag around Totnes Castle.

== History ==
Totnes Pride was originally founded by organisers and identical twins Max and Maya Price, who ran the organisation Proud2Be. The twins moved to Totnes in the early 2010s; Max Price later noted that "There wasn’t anything visible. There was a gay men’s group, so there had always been little groups, but there wasn’t a Pride event, so part of our mission was to increase visibility". As such, they launched Proud2Be in 2011, initially holding monthly social events in the town. The first Totnes Pride event took place on 14 September 2013, and was attended by guests Peter Tatchell, human rights campaigner, and Elly Barnes, an education specialist. It was scheduled to include a panel debate, workshops, talks, and a party at the South Devon Arts Centre.

The second edition of Totnes Pride, on 6 September 2014, included the addition of a temporary rainbow crossing in the town. The crossing was crowdfunded, made of liquid chalk, and placed next to Church Square. The event was larger than in 2013 according to organisers, being attended by hundreds of people. Tatchell returned for a Question Time style debate. In 2015, Proud2Be's proposal for a permanent rainbow crossing was approved by Totnes Town Council and was handed to Devon County Council for approval. 200 to 300 people took part in the 2017 Totnes Pride parade. In November 2018, South Hams District Council blocked the proposal for a permanent rainbow crossing, stating that it would "cause confusion" as people "might not be sure what it was".

The tenth Totnes Pride event, and its first fully in-person event since 2019 due to COVID-19 restrictions, took place on 3 September 2022. It included a march from the Royal Seven Stars which would continue up Fore Street, High Street and Cistern Street to Rotherfold. A Pride market was added for the first time that year.

The 2026 event took the form of a four-day festival with over 40 events. On 26 September as part of this festival, Totnes Castle was covered in a 150-metre (490 ft) rainbow flag, which was unfurled by 30 flag bearers at 10:45 BST to a crowd of 400 people. The installation was titled Capture the Castle, with flag being lent to Totnes by fellow LGBTQ organisation Torbay Pride. Organiser Ceri Goddard stated that the flag was to show that "queer people have always been here and we always will be". Liberal Democrat MP for South Devon Caroline Voaden expressed support for both the installation's message and the fact that Totnes Pride would "boost our local economy and growing profile as a centre for progressive arts and culture." The installation saw criticism on social media from some Totnes residents over the idea that the flag would diminish the historical significance of the castle. Restore Britain leader Rupert Lowe described the flag on Facebook as "wildly naff", "generally vomit-inducing", and "woke theatre". Totnes Pride organisers responded that the negative response to the flag "has been exclusively online and nearly all emanating from outside Totnes", while event attendees saw the event as "wonderful".
