= Geoff Diego Litherland =

British artist (born 1979)

Geoff Diego Litherland (born 1979 in Tehuacan, Mexico), the son of the geologist Martin Litherland, is a painter working internationally, based in the UK.

== Life and career ==
Litherland is a Mexican-born artist based in London. Having had a colourful upbringing in Bolivia and Ecuador, he moved to England and graduated from Falmouth College of Arts in 2002. Litherland has exhibited widely, both nationally and internationally and recognition to date has included being selected for the 25th John Moores Painting Prize at the Walker Art Gallery in Liverpool which was judged by Sacha Craddock, Jake and Dinos Chapman, Paul Morrison and Graham Crowley and in 2008 he won the Nottingham Castle Open.

In 2010, Litherland jointly curated the exhibition Closely Held Secrets, which featured Turner Prize winner Grayson Perry. The exhibition was an artistic collaboration between Nottingham Trent University’s Bonington Gallery, nine visual artists and a skilled digital embroidery technician who has translated and transformed a series of original artworks into a collection of digitally embroidered artefacts.

In 2011, Litherland was selected by Matthew Collings to be included in the exhibition Crash at the Charlie Dutton Gallery. He also had a solo show at Art Work Space within the Hempel Hotel London and was selected by Patricia Bickers, Pippa Hale and Robert Leckie for inclusion in the Salon Art Prize, at the Matt Roberts Arts Project Space on Vyner Street in London.

Litherland graduated with an MFA at Goldsmiths College of Art in 2012 where he was awarded The Warden's Purchase Prize. In 2012 his painting, All Animals Lead us to Light was picked for the Oriel Davis Open, in Newtown, Wales.

In 2013, Litherland was picked by Antlers Gallery, Bristol, along with five other artists to exhibit his work in their exhibition Spatial.

In 2014, Antlers Gallery approached Litherland again to exhibit at their project Exploration. This exhibition was shown at Purifier House by Bristol's Harbourside.

== Exhibitions ==
- 2014 Exploration, Antlers Gallery, Bristol.
- 2013 Spatial, Antlers Gallery, Bristol.
- 2012 MA Show, Goldsmiths College, London.
- 2012 Oriel Davis Open, Newtown, Wales.
- 2012 Geoff Diego Litherland & Thomas M Wright, Tarpey Gallery, Derby.
- 2011 Collisions, Art Work Space at the Hempel Hotel, London.
- 2011 The Bookmark Project, Nottingham Contemporary, Nottingham.
- 2011 Salon Art Prize, Matt Roberts Art Space, Vyner Street. London.
- 2010 Crash, Charlie Dutton Gallery, London.
- 2011 Open 23 (shortlisted for the Attenborough Prize), New Walk Museum, Leicester.
- 2010 Closely Held Secrets, Bonington Gallery, Nottingham.
- 2010 Race for the Prize, Tether, Nottingham.
- 2009 Conjuntos, Nottingham Castle Galleries, Nottingham.
- 2009 Multiverses, Wallner Gallery, Lakeside Art Centre, Nottingham.
- 2008 Nottingham Castle Open, Nottingham.
- 2008 John Moores 25, Liverpool, UK.
- 2004 Luxa, Arizona, USA.
- 2003 BAC! Contemporary art in the Ravel, Barcelona, Spain.
