= Bedfordshire Blue Raiders =

Former American football team based in the United Kingdom (2006–2013)

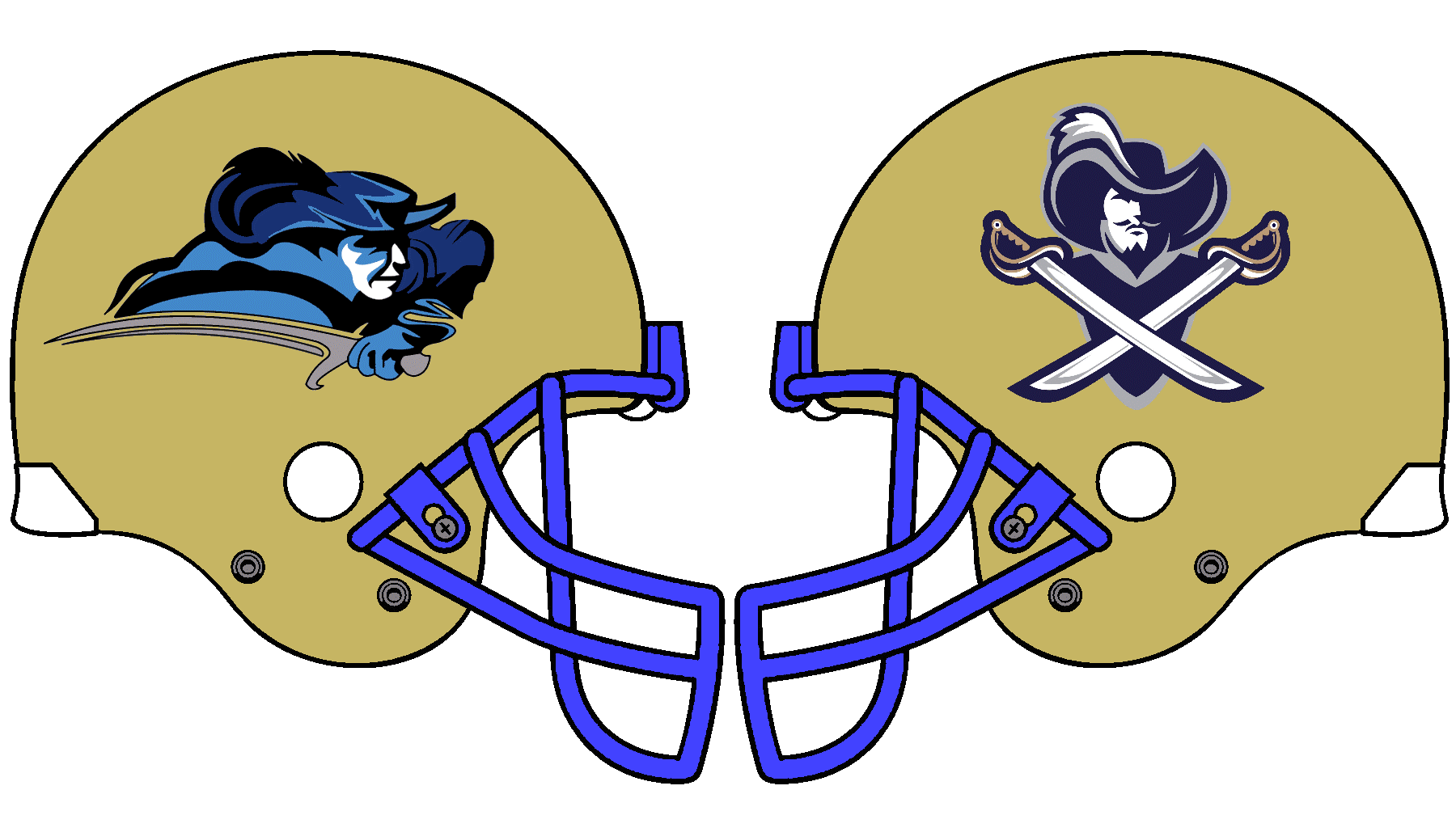
- Established: 2006
- Based in: Bedford, Bedfordshire
- Home stadium: Phil Cottier Field, Bedford International Athletics Stadium, Barkers Lane, Bedford, MK41 9SB
- League: BAFA National Leagues
- Division: Division 2 East

Personnel
- Head coach: Chris Wallis, Craig Ramsay
- General manager: Steve Guy, Tony Law

Championships
- League titles (0): None
- Division titles (0): None

Current uniform
Home

Away

The Bedfordshire Blue Raiders were an American football team competing in Division 2 East of the BAFA National Leagues (BAFANL). They entered the British American Football League in 2008 as one of five expansion teams, and play their home games at the Bedford International Athletics Stadium.

The Bedfordshire Blue Raiders merged with local rivals Milton Keynes Pathfinders in 2013 and formed Ouse Valley Eagles

== History ==
The Blue Raiders were formed in August 2006 by Dave "Hanky Panky" Pankhurst and Steve Guy to replace the former teams from local towns such as Luton, Dunstable and Milton Keynes who all found success during the 1980s and 1990s. After quickly recruiting coaches (starting with Chris Wallis, former head coach of local rivals Peterborough Saxons and Cambridgeshire Cats who Guy knew from their time together at the University of Cambridge Pythons BCAFL team in the mid-1990s) and a full playing squad.

The team were accepted as associate members of the BAFL in August 2007.

== 2007 ==
As part of the BAFL's requirements for associate members, the Blue Raiders arranged the two friendly matches which would enable them to gain full membership and enter the league the following season. The first of these was a home game played on 9 September 2007 against the Maidstone Pumas. Despite the visiting team scoring a first period touchdown, the Raiders were able to come back to win 18–8. Their away friendly match was played four weeks later against the Leicester Falcons, who themselves were associate members aiming to join the league. The Raiders lost 0–32. Two weeks later they played their third friendly match away to another associate team, the Milton Keynes City Pathfinders. Despite an early setback when their player-coach Anthony Coverdale dislocated his knee during the kickoff, they recorded a convincing 35–0 win.

The following month, it was confirmed that the Blue Raiders application to become full members had been accepted by the BAFL, and so they were entered into the league for the 2008 season where they were placed into the Eastern Conference of Division Two alongside the Peterborough Saxons, Cambridgeshire Cats, Watford Cheetahs and fellow expansion team the Milton Keynes City Pathfinders.

=== 2007 roster ===
Bedfordshire Blue Raiders 2007 roster
Quarterbacks: 8 Liam Cooke; 12 Tony Law; 7 Chad Chisolm; Running backs: 19 Khaled Miah; 23 Stuart Jackson; 42 Lee Hayward; 48 Harry Burdon; 34 Andy Cochrane; 83 Jack Calow	Wide receivers: 11 Tim Muelchi; 13 Michael McNally; 27 Matt Hollingdale; 80 Matt Jones; 81 Nathan Russell; 86 Steve Webb; 87 Sam Kilbey; 88 Anthony Coverdale; Offensive linemen: 57 Walter Bates; 60 Rick Marsh; 62 Tony Orfeo; 64 Alan Ritson; 69 Martin Songhurst; 79 Martin Kent; 72 Frank Moore	Defensive linemen: 56 Iain Connor; Mike Grigg; 92 Liam Quinlan; Dan Bradnam; 59 Paul Hayward; 66 René Scholtz; 77 Colin White-McCarthy; 54 Gareth Thomas; Defensive backs: 18 Kevin Kong; 21 Dean Faulder; 22 Chris Gray; 24 Rhys Evans; 25 Matthew Hannigan-Train; 26 Richard Davies; 29 Dean Griffith; 49 Carl Gibbins; 1 Steve Guy	Linebackers: 4 Kevin Elsdon; 5 John Stevenson; 40 Craig Wilde; 44 Paul Settle; 51 Alex Shennan; 53 Barrie Smith; 55 Mark Davis; 93 Adam Clayton	Coaching staff: Chris Wallis (HeadCoach); Steve Guy (GM); Andrew Barnard (Chairman)

=== Player awards ===
The 2007 end-of-season awards took place at Bedford Athletic Stadium:

Blue Raider of the Year – Steve Guy

Players Player of the Year – Lee Hayward

Offensive Player of the Year – Lee Hayward

Defensive Player of the Year – Kevin Elsdon & Paul Settle

Special Teams of the Year – Dean Faulder & Chad Chisolm

Rookie of the Year – Paul Settle

Head Coach's Blue Raider of the Year – Anthony Coverdale

Head Coach's Player of the Year – Mark Davis, Tony Law & Martin Songhurst joint winners

== 2008 ==
=== 2008 roster ===
Bedfordshire Blue Raiders 2008 roster
Quarterbacks: 15 Phillip Cutts; 12 Tony Law; 1 Nick Tilbury; Running backs: 27 Richard Cohen; 26 Armando Cordero; 7 Mark Davis; 5 Pete Hammond; 42 Lee Hayward; 33 Khaled Miah; 44 Michael Wilson; Wide receivers: 83 Jack Calow; 88 Anthony Coverdale; 82 Matt Hollingdale; 19 Michael Jarvis; 80 Matt Jones; 87 Sam Kilbey; 13 Michael McNally; 81 Nathan Russell; 86 Matt Smith; 21 Ben White	Tight ends: 8 Liam Cooke; 6 Steve Guy; 81 Nathan Russell; Offensive linemen: 64 Mitch Allen; 57 Walter Bates; 66 Russ Begbie; 60 Gary Culleton; 75 Brian Jelley; 79 Martin Kent; 72 Frank Moore; 71 Tim Morris; 62 Tony Orfeo; 69 Martin Songhurst; 51 Alex Wall	Defensive linemen: 98 Nick Barker; 93 Andy Barnard; 99 Iain Connor; 96 Mike Grigg; 5 Pete Hammond; 48 Liam McGar; 34 Gareth Pullen; 92 Liam Quinlan; 55 Paul Settle; 51 Alex Wall	Defensive backs: 23 Stuart Butt; 21 Cameron Clark; 40 Michael Cox; 24 Rhys Evans; 18 Kevin Kong; 17 Ricardo Lory; 29 Lee Masters; 32 Tim Muelchi; 31 Adam Parker; 11 Ali Veitch; Linebackers: 61 Gareth Boyd; 93 Alan Brook; 90 Matt Field; 25 Matthew Hannigan-Train; 50 Darren Hunt; 18 Kevin Kong; 52 John Murphy; 34 Gareth Pullen; 54 Gareth Thomas; 22 Chris Gray	Coaching staff: Chris Wallis (HeadCoach); Bob Shaw (O-Line Coach); Craig Ramsay (defensive coordinator/linebackers); Steve Guy (GM); Andrew Barnard (Chairman)

=== Player awards ===
The 2008 end-of-season awards took place at The Flower Pot in Bedford:

Blue Raider of the Year – Andy Barnard

Player of the Year – Mike Wilson

Offensive Player of the Year – Mike Wilson

Defensive Player of the Year – John Murphy

Special Teams Player of the Year – Michael Cox

Rookie of the Year – John Murphy

Coaches Player of the Year – John Murphy

Head Coach's Player of the Year – Iain Connor & Tony Law

Head Coach's Blue Raider of the Year – Andy Barnard & Steve Guy

== 2009 ==
In Blue Raiders most successful season they reach their first (and only) Playoff only to be stopped by Colchester Gladiators for the 3rd time this season.

The team were ranked 4th in the conference at the end of the regular season and therefore qualified for a playoff position.

Being ranked 4th meant that they were to meet the number one ranked qualifying team the Colchester Gladiators.

Raiders lost 16 / 41 to the Gladiators.

Coach Wallis Steps Down

The Bedfordshire Blue Raiders announce that head coach, Chris Wallis steps down.

Blue Raiders Announce New GM

General Manager and Founder Member, Steve Guy announced step down, although he will remain a part of the Blue Raiders organisation in the future.

Former QB Tony Law takes over the reins at the team and unveils to the team the re-brand and the future of the team on his watch.

Blue Raiders sign new head coach

The Bedfordshire Blue Raiders announce the appointment of Craig Ramsay as the next head coach of the team.

=== 2009 roster ===
Bedfordshire Blue Raiders 2009 Roster
Quarterbacks: 15 Phillip Cutts; 8 Jack Lidyard; 13 Nigel Mansfield; Running backs: 40 Enrique Alonso; 28 Jack Calow; 32 Eric Cullipher; 7 Mark Davis; 26 Sam Peel; 29 Liam Quinlan; 44 Michael Wilson; 31 Joe Wroczynski; Wide receivers: 88 Peter Coppenhall; 80 Martyn Forster; 82 Matt Hollingdale; 19 Michael Jarvis; 87 Sam Kilbey; 83 Dean Moore; 81 Nathan Russell; 86 Matt Smith	Tight ends: 11 Liam Cooke (TE/QB); 6 Steve Guy; Offensive linemen: 62 Mitch Allen; 57 Walter Bates; 70 Mark Blackwell; 79 Martin Kent; 72 Frank Moore; 71 Tim Morris; 60 Mark O'Donnell; 51 Demi Omisakim; 69 Martin Songhurst; 64 William Walsh; 75 Clint Wright	Defensive linemen: 98 Nick Barker; 1 Andy Barnard; 54 Gareth Boyd; 59 Iain Connor (DL/OL); 48 Pete Hammond; 25 Matthew Hannigan-Train; 61 Andy Holland; 15 Mike Keogh (DL/QB); 55 Paul Settle; Linebackers: 90 Matt Field; 96 Malc Fraser; 93 Brad Hopkins; 52 John Murphy; 50 Jim Plagmann; 50 Gareth Pullen (LB/DL); 49 Philip Wingham	Defensive backs: 17 Michael Cox; 23 Matthew Johnson (FS); 18 Kevin Kong (FS/LB); 31 Adam Parker; 27 Ben Rosen; 42 Elliot Viechweg	Coaching staff: Chris Wallis (head coach); Steve Guy (GM & assistant to Chris Wallis); Andrew Barnard (chairman & assistant to Coach Ramsay); Anthony Coverdale (wide receivers); Craig Ramsay (defensive coordinator/linebackers); Julian Fuller (special teams coordinator/line coach); Geoff Clarke (defensive backs); Rhys Evans (assistant to Coach Clarke); Matthew Hannigan-Train (assistant to Coach Ramsey); Michael Cox (assistant to Coach Clarke); Michael Wilson Snr. (running backs); Iain Connor (strength and conditioning)

== 2010 ==
This season saw the public unveiling of the new Blue Raiders logo aka "Kiefer" after its initial unveiling to the team at the 2009 Awards evening.

=== 2010 roster ===
Bedfordshire Blue Raiders 2010 roster
Quarterbacks: 7 Luke Smith; 8 Simon Perks; 11 Alan Shea; 13 Phil Cutts; Running backs: 18 Kevin Kong; 27 Josh Cerri; 29 Liam Quinlan; 30 Andi Peat; 31 Jason Crabtree; 32 Eric Cullipher; 40 Enrique Alonso; 42 Lee Hayward; 44 Michael Wilson	Tight end: 48 Mark O'Donnell; 57 Walter Bates; Wide receivers: 80 Martyn Forster; 81 Nathan Russell; 82 Chris Russell; 83 Ben White; 87 Nick Piper; 88 Pete Coppenhall	Offensive linemen: 61 Warren Temple; 62 Mitch Allen; 64 William Walsh; 66 James Salfarlie; 69 Martin Songhurst; 70 Adam Clough; 71 Tim Morris; 72 Graham Searle; 75 Lee Brown; 79 Martin Kent; Defensive linemen: 61 Warren Temple; 62 Mitch Allen; 66 James Salfarlie; 75 Lee Brown; 79 Martin Kent; 92 Liam Smith; 98 Daniel Field; 99 Michael Dilley	Defensive backs: 17 Michael Cox; 21 Clinton Harper; 22 Darren Richens; 23 Matthew Johnson; 24 Simon Conboy; 25 Don Palmacci; 28 Jamie Smith; 49 Carl Gibbins; Linebackers: 1 Darren Gregory; 4 Jim Plagmann; 50 Gareth Pullen; 52 John Murphy; 55 Matt Clark; 59 Wayne Collins	Coaching staff: Tony Law (GM); Craig Ramsay (Head Coach/defensive Co-ordinator)

=== Team awards ===
Blue Raiders win the John Slavin Award 2010 for Best Marked Field for both "Best in Division Two" and "Best in the League".

BAFRA awards the John Slavin Trophy in even numbered years to the team with the best marked field. This includes correct field dimensions, correct line and other markings, correct size goal posts, correct positioning of pylons and the condition of the field surface. The title is awarded to the team that has comes out best in an audit carried out by BAFRA members at each game. A perfect facility scores 0. In 2008, when the Trophy was last awarded on this basis, it was won by Oxford Saints. This year saw Bedfordshire Blue Raiders take the title in a close run contest with fellow Division 2 team Berkshire Renegades.

== 2011 ==
=== 2011 roster ===
Bedfordshire Blue Raiders 2011 roster
Quarterbacks: 7 Martin Day; 12 Anthony Law; 32 Darragh Mooney; 19 Cullum Papworth; Simon Perks; Running backs: 40 Enrique Alonso; Dom Alphe; 27 Joshua Cerri; Andrew Peat; Brendan Walsh; 44 Michael J Wilson; Tight end: 57 Walter Bates	Wide receivers: 80 Marytn Forster; Matt Hollingdale; 87 Daniel Kilbey; 85 Kyle Shiels; 26 Dwayne Small; 24 Jamie Smith; Ben White; Offensive linemen: Adam Clough; 66 Michael Dilley; 79 Martin Kent; 71 Tim Morris; 48 Mark O'Donnell; 56 James Salfarlie; 75 Mike Walsh; Mitch Allen; 64 William Walsh; Graham Searle	Defensive linemen: 96 Daniel Field; 72 Lee Brown; 93 Conor Hewitt; Gareth Thomas; Sean Dobson; Defensive backs: 31 Jason Del-Boyer; 49 Carl Gibbins; Kevin Kong; 22 Darren Richens	Linebackers: 54 Charles Mack; 52 John Murphy; 50 Gareth Pullen; Other: 29 Richard Cooper; Phillip Cutts; Sam Delasalle; 28 Matt Duffin; Clinton Harper; 15 Charles Luetchford; Jordan McQueen; 55 Richard Melton; 86 David Morales; David Pankhurst; 5 William Theurer; Adam Veitch	Coaching staff: Craig Ramsay (HeadCoach); Anthony Coverdale (Coach); Ian Papworth (Coach); Martin Songhurst (Coach); Michael J Wilson (Coach); Geoffrey Clarke (Coach); Mark Davis (Sideline); Steven Guy (Stats); Kevin Gedny (Official Photographer)

== 2012 ==
The 2012 season started off well for the Raiders as with an influx of new rookies and several veteran players joining the team.

This coupled with the appointments of former London Blitz Offensive Line Coach and current Great Britain Lions Offensive Line Coach Anthony Fitzpatrick as the new Offensive Co-ordinator and former Blue Raiders Center and offensive line Coach Martin Songhurst as Special Teams Co-Ordinator.

Renewed positive influences were starting to show within the team.

Conor Hewitt (DL) becomes the first-ever Bedfordshire Blue Raiders player to be selected for the Great Britain Lions U19 American football team.

=== 2012 roster ===
Bedfordshire Blue Raiders 2012 roster
Quarterbacks: 8 Simon Perks; 12 Tony Law; 18 Phillip Cutts; 19 Callum Papworth; 32 Darragh Mooney; Running backs: 24 Jamie Smith; 25 Dom Alphe; 26 Brendan Walsh; 27 Joshua Cerri; 29 Richard Cooper; 40 Enrique Alonso; 30 Andrew Peat; 44 Michael Wilson	Tight end: 48 Mark O'Donnell; 57 Walter Bates; Wide receivers: 15 Charles Luetchford; 80 Marytn Forster; 82 Matt Hollingdale; 83 Ben White; 85 Kyle Shiels; 86 David Morales; 87 Daniel Kilbey	Offensive linemen: 56 James Salfarlie; 62 Mitch Allen; 64 William Walsh; 75 Mike Walsh; 79 Martin Kent; 66 Michael Dilley; 71 Neale McMaster; Tim Morris; 72 Lee Brown; 93 Conor Hewitt; 48 Mark O'Donnell; 57 Walter Bates; Defensive linemen: 79 Martin Kent; 66 Michael Dilley; 72 Lee Brown; 93 Conor Hewitt	Defensive backs: 22 Darren Richens; 28 Matt Duffin; 31 Jason Del Boyer; 49 Carl Gibbins; Linebackers: 29 William Theurer; 54 Charles Mack; 55 Richard Melton; 96 Daniel Field; 50 Gareth Pullen; 52 John Murphy	Coaching staff: Tony Law (GM); Craig Ramsay (Head coach/defensive Co-ordinator); Anthony Fitzpartick (Offensive Co-ordinator); Martin Songhurst (Special Teams Co-ordinator); Anthony Coverdale (asst. Offensive Co-ordinator/WR coach); Anthony Fitzpartick (Interim Youth Team Head coach)

=== Player awards ===
The 2012 end-of-season awards took place at Bengal Brasserie in Bedford:

Blue Raider of the Year – Tony Law

Team MVP – Gareth Pullen

Rookie of the Year – Byron Chowles

Coach’s Player of the Year – John Murphy

Offensive MVP – Enrique Alonso

Defensive MVP – Conor Hewitt

Special Teams Player of the Year – Byron Chowles

=== Team awards ===
Blue Raiders win the John Slavin Award 2012 for Best Marked Field in Division Two for the second time running.

== 2013 ==
With great expectation the 2013 season came with the addition of a new Home strip that incorporated the colour scheme from the logo re-brand of 2010.

This season saw the club have the first winning start to the season in its history.

Riding high on a 4-0 start to the season after defeating Essex Spartans, Watford Cheetahs and Maidstone Pumas twice no one could have predicted how the rest of the season would play out.

Once again though, it was an away trip to Colchester that started the downfall of the Raiders season. Poor turnouts in the practices leading up to the game, were starting to take its toll, but as usual the squad arrived on Gameday confident of pulling out a win. Sadly that wasn’t to be the case, and Colchester cantered to a 48-16 victory on their way to lifting the National Division title.

Whilst sporting a record of 4-1, externally everything was rosy for the Blue Raiders. Internally however, practice numbers were falling into the low teens occasionally, as injuries and a lack of player commitment by various members of the squad started to take its toll. 3 back to back losses, including a 21-7 loss to rivals Milton Keynes Pathfinders had left the Raiders with a 4-4 record heading into the last two games of the season. By this point the Raiders had lost a lot of players, and the squad size was approximately half of that which started the season, none of which could have been expected. With no healthy QB’s on the roster for the scheduled game against the Kent Exiles, the decision was made to forfeit the fixture and hand Kent a 1-0 win. This took the Blue Raiders to an upside down record of 4-5, with no hopes of making the playoffs and struggling to see out the season. Practices were now down to around 5-15 people average, and the future was not as bright as all had hoped.

The final game of the season was an away fixture at the Essex Spartans, the team the Blue Raiders beat in the opening game of the season. In order to be able to play this fixture several members of the Blue Raiders coaching staff had to re-register as players and start this game. Thankfully the experience of the players brought them through a tough game, and they finished the season a respectable 5-5. Little did anyone know that this would be the final game the Blue Raiders ever played.

At the end of the game, club general manager Tony Law announced he was stepping down as chairman, and that an EGM would be scheduled to sort out a new GM moving forward. At this point, coaches Anthony Fitzpatrick, Anthony Coverdale, Martin Songhurst and head coach Craig Ramsay also announced they would be stepping down, with Fitzpatrick and Coverdale heading to coach at Premier Division team, the London Blitz, Songhurst stepping down to concentrate on other interests and Ramsay stepping down to spend time with his family, after nearly 25 years of coaching.

=== Player awards ===
The 2013 end-of-season awards took place at Indian Summer in Bedford:

Team MVP – John Murphy

Offensive Player of the Year – Darragh Mooney

Defensive Player of the Year – Michael Cox

Special Teams Player of the Year – Danny Lipner

Rookie of the Year – Jack Judge

== Senior team season records ==
Season	Division	Wins	Losses	Ties	PF	PA	Final position	Playoff record	Notes
2007	BAFL Qualifying	2	1	0	N/A	N/A	N/A	Wins: Maidstone Pumas MK Pathfinders. Loss: Leicester Falcons	—
2008	BAFL Division Two East	4	6	0	128	197	3 / 5	—	—
2009	BAFL Division Two East	8	2	0	203	73	2 / 4	Lost 16–41 to Colchester Gladiators in quarter-final.	—
2010	BAFA Community Leagues Division Two East	6	4	0	176	134	3 / 6	—	—
2011	BAFA National Leagues Division Two East	3	6	0	88	182	5 / 7	—	—
2012	BAFA National Leagues Division Two East	4	6	0	130	190	4 / 6	—	—
2013	BAFA National Leagues South Central	5	5	0	184	163	4 / 7	—	—

== Blue Raiders Britball records ==
Longest run 94 – Lee Hayward, (Bedfordshire Blue Raiders) vs Maidstone Pumas, 9 September 2007

Most sacks in a season 13.0 – Paul Settle – 2008

Oldest player to rush for a 1,000 yards in a season Michael J Wilson (born 1963) in 2008. (This record was never submitted to the Britball)
