= New Line Learning =

Concept schools in Maidstone, Kent, England

The New Line Academies are two concept schools present in South Maidstone, Kent, England. It consisted of two secondary schools (Cornwallis Academy and New Line Learning Academy) in South Maidstone who were governed under one body to improve standards for children and create greater consistency in the quality of provision through a collective approach to education.

== Overview ==
The system of education in England is mainly provided through individual self-managing schools within the context of the National Curriculum, influence from Local Authorities and national regulation through OFSTED. Despite this regulation, education standards vary markedly according to the success or otherwise of individual schools and even departments within schools.

The schools had re-branded themselves as ‘New Line Learning’ to reflect a novel approach to secondary education characterised by a set of values that are founded in the new Academies programme and research evidence about how children learn and what sets appropriate conditions for learning. As a start, the schools' new logo had been designed in consultation with the students and reflects the new direction in their education. Replacing the old logo with the new one is a first sign of change. Other changes will be the GCSE results.

The purpose of the UK Government's Academies programme is to raise standards in education in England and it is not confined to schools with low attainment although many new Academies have been in that category. Successful schools are expected to innovate and provide leadership through the Academies programme because they are often in the best position to do so. The majority of CTCs have become Academies. because they are expected to innovate particularly in the fields of ICT, enterprise and work related learning. In 2014 the Cornwallis Academy achieved 47% in the 5 A*-C performance indicator including English and Mathematics GCSEs which is below both Kent and National figures, and in 2013 only 3% of students achieved the English baccalaureate. Its performance including Mathematics and English is at about the Kent and national averages and similar to performance in previous years before it became an academy. The New Line Learning initiative is therefore in keeping with its academy status but it is too early to tell whether the new approach will further raise standards or enable the success to continue at the New Line Learning Schools. The purpose of the Academies programme is in part to try new things and see what works.

== Approach ==
The approach is based on a simple rationale. Children who enjoy school do better than those who don't. Increasing the proportion of children who enjoy school will support raised standards. The research basis for the changes includes work on emotional intelligence and change management. Enjoyment comes from success and the project is designed to enable all young people to be successful and fulfilled through sharing resources and talents across the three schools. This requires an expectation of growing maturity from the students and co-operation from members of the local community. In line with the Academies remit, all three schools share a common curriculum that is extensively supported by information and communication technology.

The research evidence on the benefits of ICT to schools is generally positive but the rapid changes in technology and how it is employed in the classroom make up to date data with robust conclusions more difficult than in other fields. Given that resources such as Wikipedia are becoming increasingly sophisticated sources of information but with the downside of many more possibilities for misinformation, it seems inevitable that technology will become an increasing part of general education not least because children have to learn to deal with access to massively increasing quantities of information. This is no different from the printing press enabling books to become mainstream parts of learning. New Line Learning is collecting evidence about how high investment in ICT affects learning as part of its core provision.

== Governance ==
The New Line Learning federation has one governing body for Cornwallis Academy and New Line Learning Academy.

== Key characteristics ==
The principles of emotional intelligence are at the heart of the education programme. This is based on the belief that the traditional academic development that is characteristic of most education institutions is only one of the multiple intelligences that need developing in a school. There are common pastoral programmes and procedures plus a common set of values across the federation to support this. New Line Learning is working with Yale University and University College London to develop pupils’ emotional maturity through its emotional intelligence programmes.

Another key characteristic is the development of information technology as a support for learning. Internet based methods are used to poll student perceptions of lessons so that planning can be based on direct feedback from these clients. There is a specific priority for using empirical research evidence as a basis for planning the provision.

== See also ==
- Experiential education
