= Stoke Newington School =

Stoke Newington School & Sixth Form
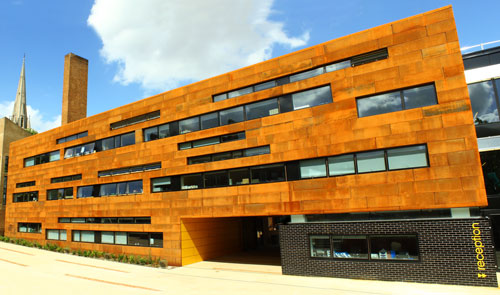

Location
- Clissold Road; Stoke Newington, London, N16 9EX; United Kingdom; 51°33′32″N 0°05′02″W

Information
- Type: Community
- Established: 1982
- Local authority: Hackney
- Department for Education URN: 100279 Tables
- Ofsted: Reports
- Chair of Governors: Shekeila Scarlett
- Head teacher: Zehra Jaffer
- Gender: Mixed
- Age: 11 to 18
- Enrolment: 1,708
- Publication: Spotlight
- Website: www.stokenewingtonschool.co.uk

Stoke Newington School (SNS) is a secondary school situated in the Stoke Newington area, in the London Borough of Hackney.

== History ==
The school is an amalgamation of Clissold Park Secondary Modern School and Woodberry Down School, with the new school founded in 1982 in the building of the former Clissold Park Secondary Modern School.

In 2002, the school's Media Arts specialism was granted by the then Department for Education and Skills (DfES). A second specialism in science was awarded by the DfES in 2005, hence the title Media Arts & Science College in use by the school since 2006. The specialist schools programme ended in 2011. The current headteacher of the school is Zehra Jaffer, who succeeded Annie Gammon in 2018.

In the 2007 report produced by the Office for Standards in Education (Ofsted), Stoke Newington School was described as "an outstanding school with a culture of high expectations" and that "close attention to making sure that all students do as well as they possibly can characterises the school's leadership and management at all levels". Stoke Newington School has a sixth form which was launched in September 2006.

Renovation of the school under the 'Building Schools for the Future' (BSF) programme was completed in 2010. Willmott Dixon was the main contractor undertaking the new building and refurbishment of the school. Their appointed architect was Jestico + Whiles who won the RIBA May 2011 award for their work on the school. The completed works on the school include a new entrance building containing 13 new classrooms clad in cor-ten steel, a new dining hall, improvements to the circulation (with more connecting corridors on second and third floors), replacements of the old temporary classrooms, new roofing throughout, new furniture and IT equipment. New disabled access features were also installed to allow as much accessibility as possible to the older buildings, including new ramps and lifts.

Stoke Newington School is noted for its anti-homophobia drive, with music teacher Elly Barnes coming no. 1 in The Independent newspaper's 'Pink List' LGBT awards. The school uses 'behaviour mentors', who aim to reduce bullying and discrimination. The school was praised in its Ofsted report for its anti-bullying strategy.

== Notable alumni ==
- Sid Vicious – Sex Pistols bassist
- Labrinth -Timothy Lee McKenzie, singer, songwriter, rapper and record producer
- Saffron Burrows, actress
- Adam Deacon, actor
- Juno Calypso, artist
- Tao Geoghegan Hart, racing cyclist
- Stephen Paul Manderson, a singer who performs under the stage name Professor Green
- Lawrence Okolie, Olympic boxer
- Liam Charles, baker/tv personality
- Sean Clare, professional footballer
- Lotte Wubben-Moy, footballer
- Maurice Hope, boxer, 1972 Olympian, 1979 WBC light middleweight world champion
- Paige Bailey-Gayle, footballer
- Asa Butterfield, actor

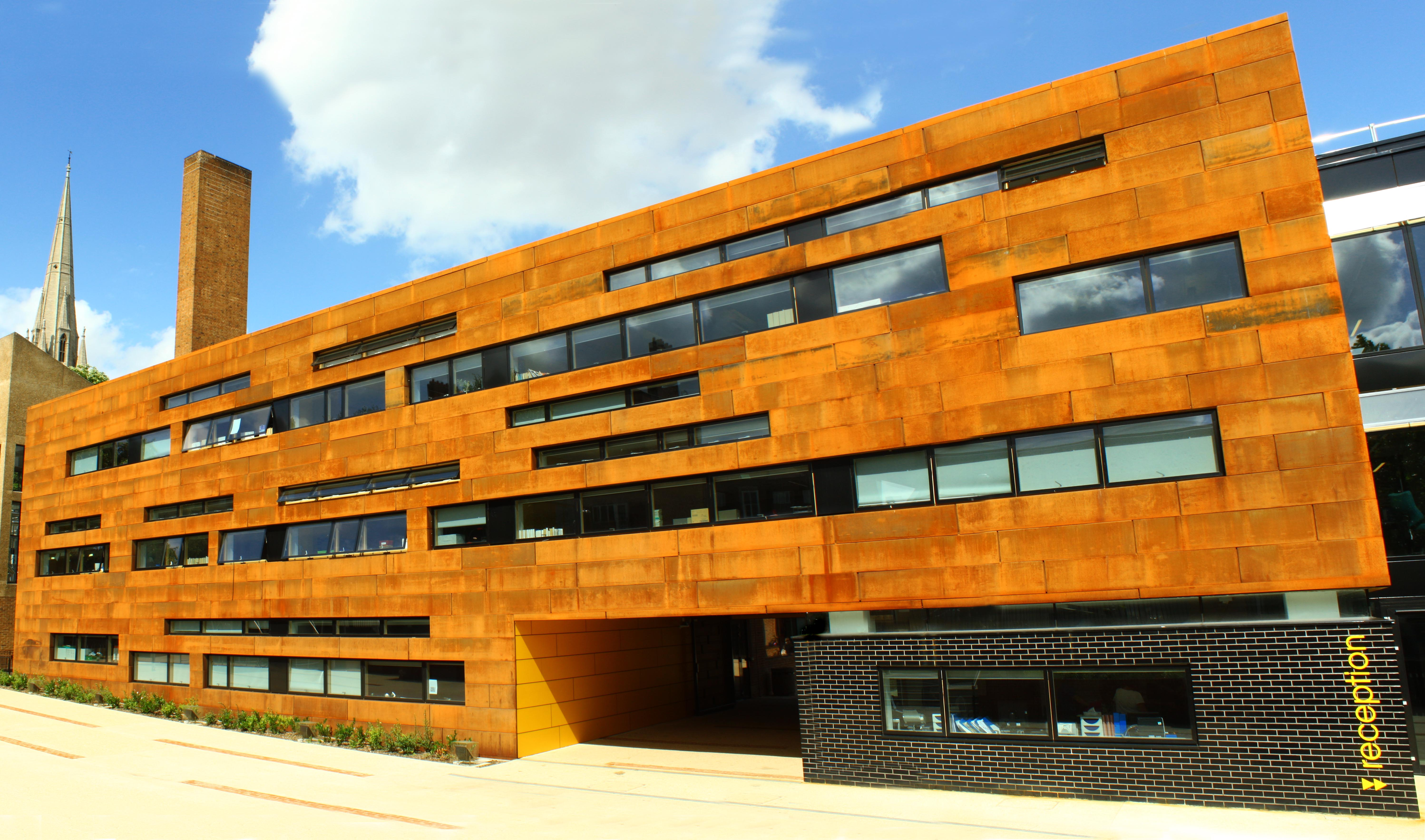
