= Craven Hill Gardens =

Garden square in Bayswater, London

Coordinates: 51°30′46″N 0°10′56″W

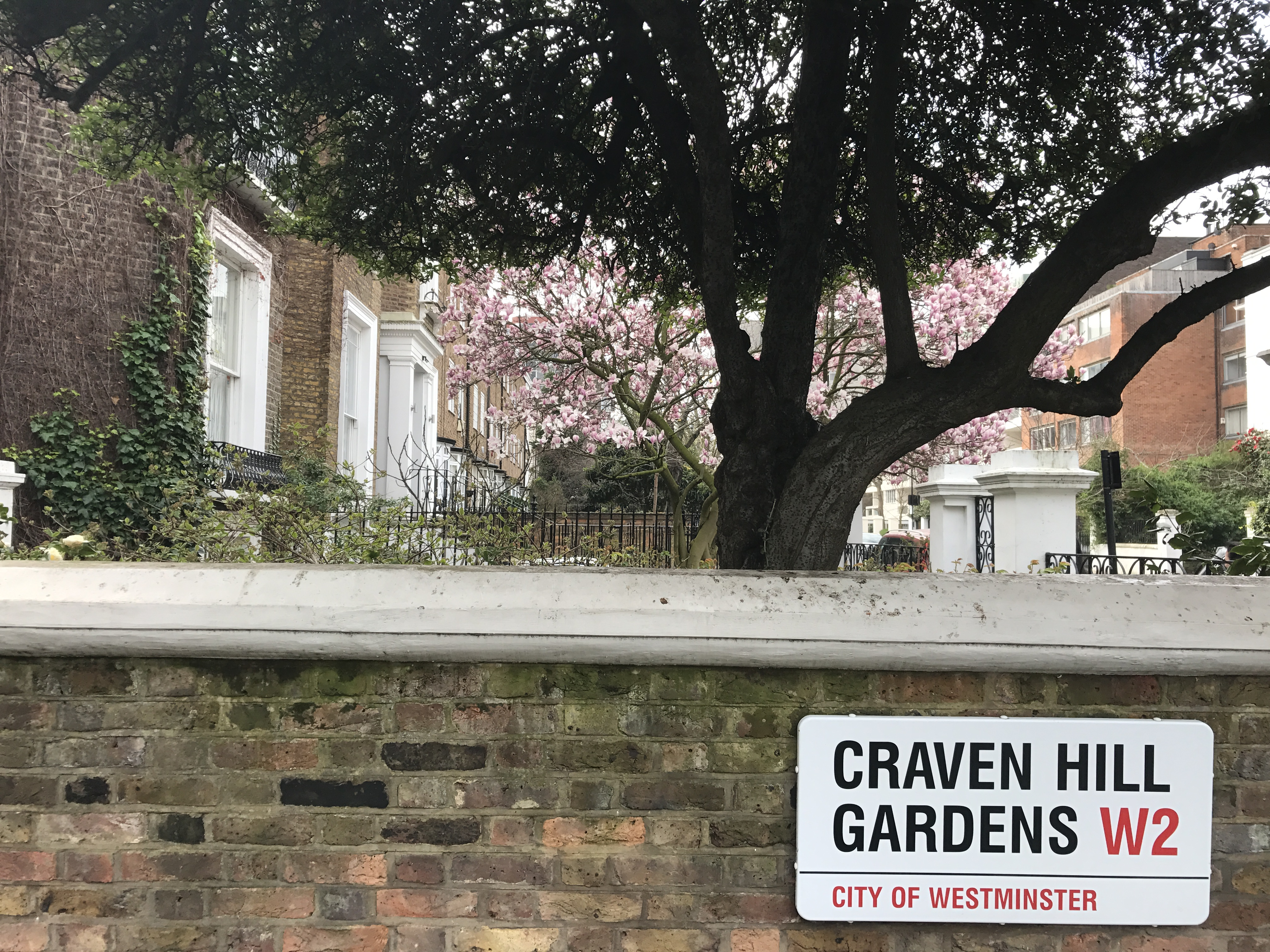
Craven Hill Gardens street sign

Craven Hill Gardens /kreɪvən/ is a classical, Victorian, residential garden estate which has two small garden squares, the green subset of squares in London. It is located in Lancaster Gate, Bayswater, which is south-west of contemporary Paddington (that it was once a part of). It is made up of four rows of residential buildings lining its three streets and eastern returns, lying between 160 and 250 metres north of Hyde Park. The western return of this street configuration is partly Leinster Gardens and partly Leinster Terrace.

Numbers 13–23, the higher numbers of Craven Hill – a continuation street – face its larger private garden, one block of which is a listed building. A 1960s block, known as Corringham, forms its second architecturally exceptional building and has a large private garden, the secondary garden. Both gardens are surrounded by trees. The estate was a semi-rural possession of the Lords Craven in the 18th century.

== Location and history ==
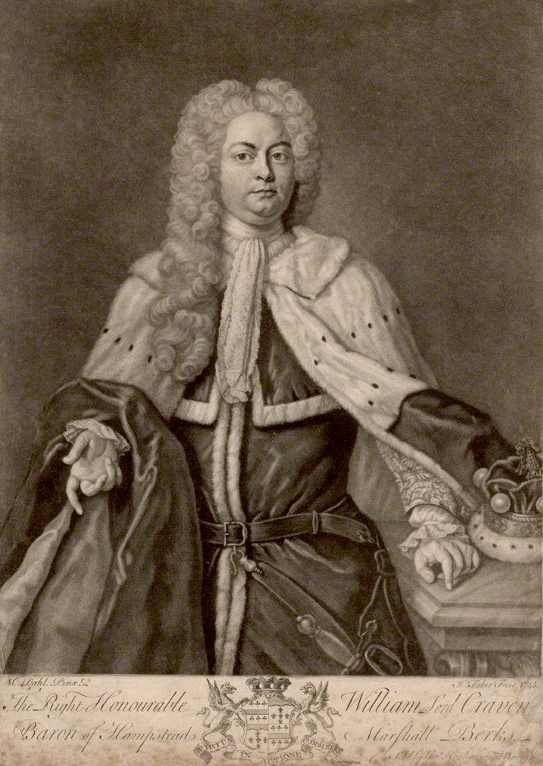
Lord Craven (d.1739) who bought the formerly agricultural estate

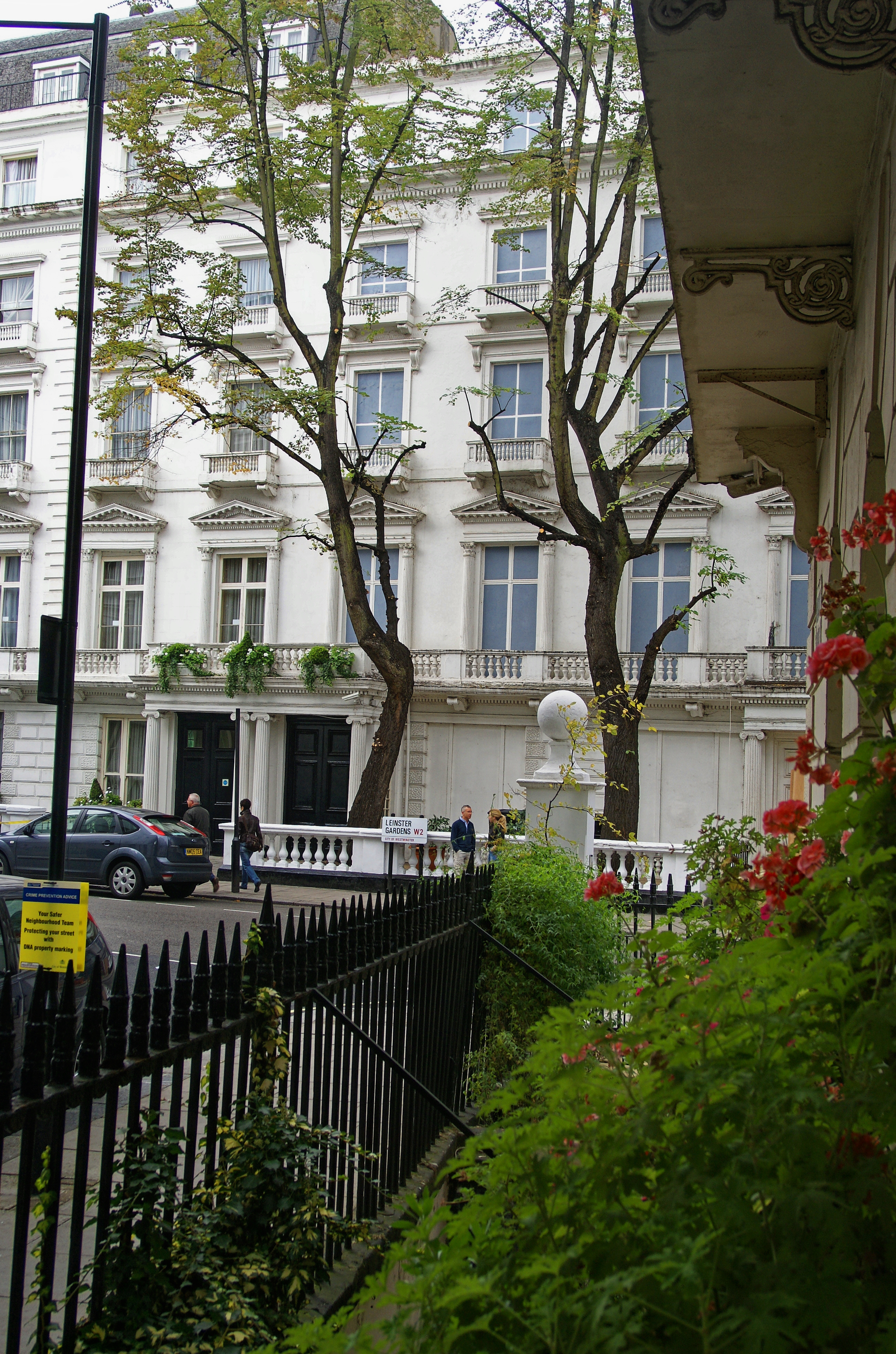
Craven Hill Gardens

In fields west of the hamlet Bayswater (or Bayard's watering place as a text of 1380 first records) were the buildings of Upton farm, a few hundred yards back from the highway to Oxford at the end of a tree-lined lane, which William Craven, 3rd Baron Craven bought in 1733. In 1746 two buildings stood near the road east of the Bayswater rivulet and three on the west side. The lane still led through fields, to Lord Craven's early pest house, east of which were two more buildings, presumably barns, beside the rivulet. The farm in 1742 was "intended to be called Craven Hill". Dwellings had replaced the pest house here, where publisher Edward Orme of Bond Street bought the lease of a house in 1811. Artistic and literary figures were attracted to a district which was then semi-rural. In 1834, poet Sarah Flower Adams (1805-48), moved with her husband to 5 Craven Hill, where they were soon followed by the author and politician William Johnson Fox (1786-1864) and his housekeeper the composer Eliza Flower.

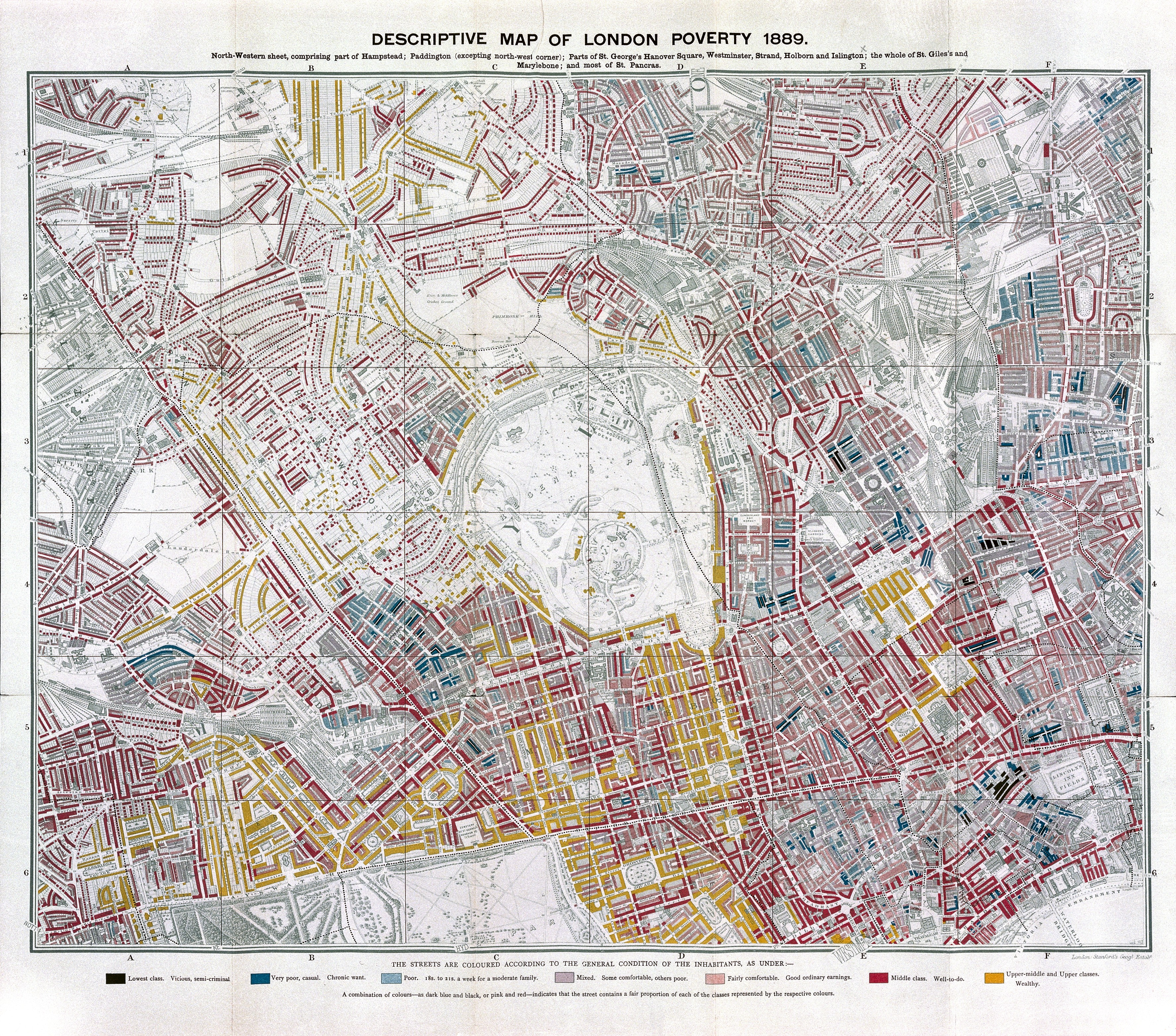
Charles Booth (social reformer)'s poverty map, 1889. The gold-coloured wealth of the south-western Lancaster Gate wards is apparent.

By 1889, the wealthy southern newly made parish, Bayswater, was among an unbroken string of gold-coloured neighbourhoods by Hyde Park — documented in Booth's poverty map as socially distinct from the generally low-to-mid income central, neighbouring heartland, of what was left of Paddington. Lancaster Gate East and West wards one of which contains the area, created in 1901, had initially 2.15 per cent and 2.58 of their inhabitants overcrowded, compared with 32.76 per cent in Church ward around Paddington Green.

In 1965 a change took place in the local authority (borough) of Craven Hill Gardens: the City of Westminster engulfed the Metropolitan Borough of Paddington, an identical area to the ancient parish of Paddington that included and was, historically, the description of the area.

== Layout ==
The address forms two half-green rectangles whose remainder and surrounds are Victorian-built properties in tall, long terraces with a mixture of exposed ornamental brickwork, stone facings and many white or cream stucco fronts (façades), whether in part or whole. Their use is as private apartments, hotels and international consulate/embassy and corporate lodgings.

Craven Hill Gardens forms four rows of buildings numbered consecutively 1 to 42, one row of which is Corringham (numbers 13–15).

Notable buildings

Two of its terraces are listed buildings:

- One is free-standing Corringham (numbers 13–15), laid out by Kenneth Frampton (born 1930, in later life, Ware Professor of Architecture at Columbia University) behind which is the secondary private garden.
- 21-23 Craven Hill marks the highest-numbered end of that address which then becomes the briefer, central arm of Craven Hill Gardens. It faces the primary private garden.

The Hempel Hotel was on the street.

== Notable residents ==
- Rev. John William Donaldson (d.1861): briefly a headmaster and later tutor at Cambridge. He was noted for his works on classical texts, especially collating and promoting the surviving fragments of the Book of Jashar. Usually resident at Cambridge with his second wife, he died at 21 Craven Hill, his mother's house, while he was expected to be in London as an examiner at the University of London.

== See also ==
- Queensway
- Leinster Gardens
- Lancaster Gate
