= Antlers Gallery =

Coordinates: 51.4562°N 2.5968°W

Antlers Gallery is a commercial gallery based in Bristol England. Created in 2010 by gallery Director Jack Gibbon, Antlers Gallery produces temporary exhibitions across varying locations, with their only permanent base being online. Dubbed the 'nomadic' gallery, they use a similar business model to pop – up galleries but tie these together under the gallery brand. Antlers also have an active publishing wing working with artists producing limited edition prints and multiples.

Antlers Gallery represent a group of contemporary artists through exhibitions, art fairs and consultancy. Although primarily based in Bristol – with exhibitions held in areas such as Park Street, Cabot Circus, Whiteladies Road, Christmas Steps and Bristol Temple Meads railway station. Previous exhibitions have also been held in Stroud, Yorkshire and London. Antlers Gallery exhibit at art fairs across the U.K, including the Affordable Art Fairs and London Art Fair.

The Antlers model is based on mutually beneficial relationships with private landlords. These have included:- Land Securities, TCN UK, Jess Properties, Kingsley Thomas, and Linden Homes.

Their first pop-up exhibition Grotesques opened in December 2010. Followed by: Uncanny Views, Dark Suits, Botany, Anatomy, Other Nature, Still Chaos, Excursus, Old Beliefs, Narrative, Spatial, BLACKLIGHT, Kindred and Hiatus.

In March 2014 Antlers Gallery took over the newly renovated warehouse space Purifier House, next to Bristol's Harbourside and Millennium Square. The property, owned by Linden Homes, showcased three Antlers exhibitions: Gravitas, Exploration and Anima Mundi.

Anima Mundi ran from 5 – 27 July. The main focus of the exhibition was a 5m long, concertina bookwork created by Tim Lane. The publication of the bookwork was made possible due to the support of over 140 people who pledged support via the Kickstarter campaign which raised almost £18,000. The exhibition received much media attention, including BBC News and The Independent. In 2014 Antlers Gallery was recognised by The Guardian as one of the top ten venues in Bristol.

== Artists ==
Artists represented by Antlers Gallery include: Abigail Reed, Alexander Korzer – Robinson, Anouk Mercier, Charles Emerson, Dorcas Casey, Ellie Coates, Geoff Diego Litherland, Helen Jones, Jemma Appleby, Jessica Bartlett, Jo Lathwood, Jonny Byles, Karin Krommes, Kate Evans, Matthieu Leger, Max Naylor, Rachel Sokal, Rebecca Hiscocks, Rose Sanderson, Sarah Jeffs, and Tim Lane.
