= Senacre Technology College =

Coordinates: 51°14′32.3″N 0°33′46.2″E

- Maidstone

Information
- Type: Secondary school
- Local authority: Kent
- Gender: Coeducational
- Age: 11 to 18

Senacre Technology College was a secondary school in Maidstone, Kent.

The school became a Technology College in September 1994.

The school closed in 2008 and the pupils transferred to the New Line Learning Academy.
