= Dante Arthurs =

Australian murderer (born 1984)

- Born: Dante Wyndham Arthurs; 8 August 1984 (age 42); Rockingham, Western Australia, Australia
- Occupations: Fruit and vegetable packer
- Status: Incarcerated
- Convictions: Murder; unlawful detention
- Criminal charges: Wilful murder; sexual penetration; unlawful detention
- Penalty: Life imprisonment with non-parole period of 13 years

Details
- Victims: Sofia Rodriguez-Urrutia Shu
- Date: 26 June 2006
- Location: Canning Vale, Western Australia
- Date apprehended: 27 June 2006

Dante Wyndham Arthurs (born 8 August 1984) is an Australian murderer, convicted of the murder of eight-year-old Sofia Rodriguez-Urrutia Shu.

On 17 November 2007 Arthurs pleaded guilty to the charges of murder and unlawful detention and was convicted in the Supreme Court of Western Australia; he was sentenced to life imprisonment with a non-parole period of 13 years. As of June 2023, Arthurs is imprisoned in Casuarina Prison. Bids by him for parole were dismissed in June 2019, May 2022 and again in May 2025. Arthurs is next due to be considered for parole in 2028.

Many areas of the Western Australian and Australian community debated the re-introduction of the death penalty due to the emotion evoked by Rodriguez-Urrutia Shu's murder. The last person hanged in Western Australia was Eric Edgar Cooke in 1964 and the death penalty was abolished in that state in 1984.

== Crime ==
At 4:00 pm on 26 June 2006, Rodriguez-Urrutia Shu, aged eight, was at the Livingston Shopping Centre in Canning Vale with her uncle, sister and brother. While her family waited in the main area of the shopping centre, Sofia went down a corridor to go to the toilet. Arthurs, an employee at the shopping centre, followed her, and after she left the female toilets, grabbed her from behind, dragged her into the nearby disabled toilet cubicle, and locked the door.

Rodriguez-Urrutia Shu's family, having waited only a few moments, became concerned and her 14-year-old brother was sent to look for her. He called for her at the door of the female toilet but not getting a response walked back along the corridor. He heard movement coming from the disabled cubicle and knocked on the locked door calling Sofia's name. There was no response. Sofia's brother, uncle and younger sister then began a search of the centre. A few minutes later, her brother again returned to the disabled toilet cubicle and opened the now unlocked door. It was at this time, only 10 minutes after Sofia left her family that her brother found her naked body lying on the cubicle floor. A search of the shopping centre failed to locate an offender, and the entire centre was closed and declared a crime scene.

While Arthurs was restraining her and removing her clothes her limbs became so severely contorted that both her legs were broken and her left arm was dislocated. Rodriguez-Urrutia Shu's throat was also severely compressed and her larynx was crushed as Arthurs attempted to muffle her cries. She also received a severe perineal tear. The cause of her death was given to be a direct result of strangulation.

=== Criminal investigation ===
Initial investigations at the shopping centre identified a few possible suspects. Arthurs was known to local detectives due to a sexual assault on an eight-year-old girl in the same area three years earlier. Police remained at the crime scene well into the early morning and at 5:00 am the day after Rodriguez-Urrutia Shu's body was discovered, they attended the home of Arthurs who lived with his parents a few hundred metres from the shopping centre. After a search of his home, Arthurs was arrested and later charged with wilful murder, two counts of sexual penetration of a child, and deprivation of liberty.

In his interview with police, Arthurs admitted to digitally penetrating Rodriguez-Urrutia Shu; however, it could not be determined whether this had occurred prior to or after her death. During the attack, which was estimated to have lasted between 3 and 5 minutes, Rodriguez-Urrutia Shu's brother knocked on the door of the cubicle having heard movement coming from inside while searching for her. Though Arthurs made admissions to hearing the knock on the door and a name being called, neither he nor the police could determine whether Rodriguez-Urrutia Shu was still alive at that time. Rodriguez-Urrutia Shu was left naked and dead or dying on the floor as Arthurs made his escape.

== Legal controversy ==
Once the news of Rodriguez-Urrutia Shu's murder spread and information about her alleged killer was revealed, media organisations locally, nationally and internationally took great interest. The crime was described in many news reports as the most horrific murder in Western Australia since the David and Catherine Birnie murders in the 1980s. Western Australia police were required to quash strong rumours that Arthurs was one of the child murderers convicted of the murder of James Bulger in the United Kingdom in 1993. It was alleged that Arthurs was in fact Robert Thompson, who at the age of 10 years was convicted of Bulger's murder, given a new identity and then transported to Australia. Information was revealed publicly by the Western Australian and Australian Federal Police that Arthurs was not Thompson and the rumour gathered no more momentum. On 29 June 2006, the British High Commission in Canberra issued a media release stating "There is no connection between the man arrested in Western Australia and the individuals involved in the James Bulger case." Australia has not taken British convicts since 1868.

Further controversy arose when information was revealed in the local media that Arthurs had been investigated for a sexual assault 3 years earlier in 2003, against another 8-year-old girl. It was reported by media and later confirmed by Western Australia Police Commissioner Karl O'Callaghan and the Director of Public Prosecutions, that Arthurs was in fact arrested for the assault; however, charges were dropped due to insufficient evidence and incorrect police interviewing techniques. At the time of Rodriguez-Urrutia Shu's murder in 2006, the 2003 assault was re-opened to identify any possible links.

It was then identified that the shorts worn by Arthurs in the 2003 assault had traces of the victim's blood on them that weren't noticed during the 2003 investigation. Western Australia Police received public condemnation for failing to have the shorts forensically examined, which could have secured the conviction of Arthurs for the 2003 assault and therefore could have prevented Rodriguez-Urrutia Shu's murder. It was also confirmed that after the 2003 assault, the Director of Public Prosecutions refused to consider charges against Arthurs because they considered that the police had been too robust in interviewing him and that a conviction was unlikely to be obtained. Though Rodriguez-Urrutia Shu's family were frustrated by this discovery, they publicly supported the police and understood that a successful conviction against Arthurs in 2003 – if it had occurred – would not have guaranteed their daughter would still be alive today.

== Legal proceedings ==
Rodriguez-Urrutia Shu's family were devastated by their daughters' murder and could not face the prospect of the court process. They were unable to attend any of the proceedings and so were represented by two members of the Mater Christi Catholic Primary School Parish, a school that Sofia attended in the suburb of Yangebup. Head priest at the Parish, Father Bryan Rosling took up the family's struggle to deal with the massive media attention the murder had raised. Paul Litherland, a Western Australian police officer and a parent of one of Rodriguez-Urrutia Shu's schoolmates, represented the family and set up fund raising events.

On 7 March 2007, after extensive psychological testing and discussions between prosecutors and Arthurs' defence counsel, Arthurs was required to enter a plea to the charges of wilful murder, two counts of sexual penetration of a child, and unlawful detention. He pleaded not guilty to all four charges and was remanded in custody. On 31 August 2007, Justice Peter Blaxell ruled that the bulk of the admissions made by Arthurs in a video recorded interview with police on the morning after the offence, would be inadmissible at his trial on ground of "persistent importunity, or sustained or undue insistence or pressure".

Arthurs was diagnosed with Asperger syndrome by forensic psychologist Greg Dear.

On 31 July 2007, Chief Justice Wayne Martin ruled that Arthurs would receive a bench trial. Martin said that the "extensive, continuous and in some respects extraordinary" pre-trial media coverage, the circumstances of the offence and the fact that a judge would provide reasons for his or her decision supported a trial by judge alone. Hence it was agreed that Arthurs would be heard by a judge and not a jury. In the meantime, discussions continued with the Director of Public Prosecutions and Arthurs' lawyers regarding his plea status. In August 2007, Arthurs and prosecutors entered into an agreement that would see Arthurs plead guilty to the lesser charge of murder, instead of the current charge of wilful murder. On 17 September 2007, Arthurs pleaded guilty in the Supreme Court to charges of murder and unlawful detention. The two counts of sexual penetration of a child under the age of 10 were withdrawn because forensic analysis could not conclude if Rodriguez-Urrutia Shu had been sexually assaulted before or after she died.

On 7 November 2007, Arthurs was sentenced to life in prison with a non-parole period of 13 years. He was also sentenced to two years for depriving Rodriguez-Urrutia Shu of her liberty. Describing Arthurs' crimes as "so evil they shock the public conscience", Justice John McKechnie also advised Arthurs of the possibility that he may never be released as the release of offenders sentenced to life imprisonment must be signed off by the Western Australian Attorney-General.

== Other allegations ==
After Arthurs pleaded guilty it was publicly confirmed that he was under investigation by British police for sexually assaulting another girl in 2001. Arthurs was never charged with this incident because he left Britain for Australia before an identity parade could take place.

== Sofia Rodriguez-Urrutia Shu's legacy ==
=== The Chapel of the Innocents ===
Rodriguez-Urrutia Shu's small school community was devastated by her murder, and set about to raise funds for a memorial to her at the school. Over A$250,000 was raised locally at the school for a memorial to Sofia and all Western Australian children who have had their lives stolen by criminals. The Chapel of the Innocents was constructed in 2008 and is the resting place of her ashes.

=== Changes to legislation ===
After Rodriguez-Urrutia Shu was murdered, police were restricted in their ability to charge Arthurs with wilful murder, because it could not be proved it was his intention to murder her. Wilful murder, which carried a term of life imprisonment with a non-parole period of 15 years (minimum) to 19 years (maximum) at the time, was the highest charge that could be preferred for the taking of a life. Instead, Arthurs had to be charged and convicted with the lesser offence of murder, which excluded the element of intent. This still carried a penalty of life imprisonment; however, the non-parole periods were 7 years (minimum) to 14 years (maximum). For what many considered to be one of the most horrific crimes in Western Australia for decades, Arthurs might have spent only 7 years in jail. This caused a massive public outcry and a demand was made to force a change to the laws for murder in Western Australia.

Through the then Attorney General Jim McGinty, Rodriguez-Urrutia Shu's family and their many supporters petitioned the Government to have the laws changed to reflect more clearly the seriousness of the crimes committed. As a result, the charges of wilful murder and murder were repealed and a single charge of murder was created to include more severe penalty options. Though a distinction between an intent to murder and non-intent was still included, the sentencing considerations were dramatically altered. The new legislation calls for an ability to impose a "never to be released" clause as well as a change in the minimum sentence that can be imposed before release on parole can be considered. For murder with intent the minimum sentence is 20 years and for murder without a proved intent (manslaughter) it is 15 years.

=== Sex offender register ===
In addition to the changes to murder legislation, Rodriguez-Urrutia Shu's family worked to have the Western Australian Government introduce a public sex offender register. This would see the names and suburbs (but not addresses) of convicted sex offenders be made available to the public. Though public support was very strong for such a register, the government stalled on the legislation due to the concerns such legislation could cause to the safety of known sex offenders. Police in particular showed concerns for the fear of vigilante attacks against sex offenders who have been released after serving their time in jail. In November 2011, the government of Western Australia passed legislation in the lower house for a register. It was envisioned that serious and repeat offenders would have their names and suburbs published on a public website. Furthermore, parents would be able to check if people who have regular contact with their children were on the sex offenders register. This would be by way of providing the person's details to police. In June 2012, the Western Australian sex offender register was enacted as legislation. On 15 October 2012, the register went live.

== Parole attempt ==
In June 2018, the 12th anniversary of Rodriguez-Urrutia Shu's murder, a public petition was initiated in preparation for Arthurs' first parole hearing scheduled in early 2019. On 26 June 2019, Arthurs was considered for parole, having served a 13-year minimum term of imprisonment. The petition addressed current Attorney-General of Western Australia John Quigley and called on support from the public for the non-release of Arthurs, regardless of his eligibility for parole. Within a few days the online petition had gathered 75,000 signatures, and over the following two weeks it grew to 100,000 signatures. The petition gained strong media attention in Western Australia and reflected public concern that Arthurs may be released prior to his maximum term of imprisonment having been served. Many members of the public were shocked that it had already been 12 years since Rodriguez-Urrutia Shu was murdered. The media attention drew public comment from Quigley, who stated "the wishes of Sofia's family will weigh heavily in any decision I might make regarding this shocking case."

On 20 June 2019, Attorney-General Quigley supported a recommendation by the Western Australian Prison Review Board that Arthurs not be released into the community. Arthurs was again considered for and denied parole in 2022 and in May 2025.

== See also ==
- List of Australian criminals
