= One Aldwych =

Hotel in London

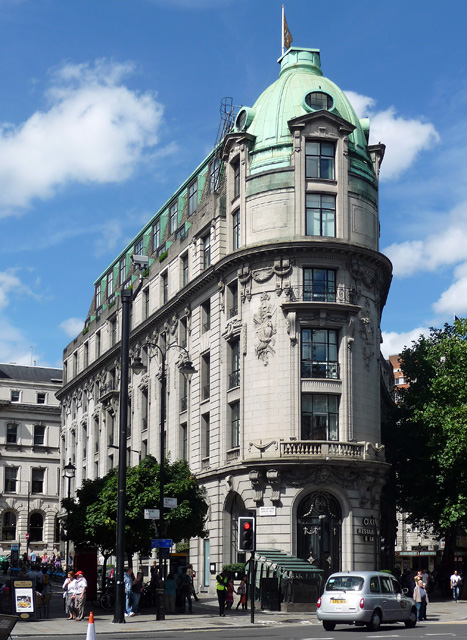
- The One Aldwych Hotel

- Location within Central London

General information
- Location: 1 Aldwych, Covent Garden, City of Westminster. London, England, United Kingdom
- Coordinates: 51°30′42.26″N 0°7′8.77″W
- Opening: 1998

Other information
- Number of rooms: 105
- Number of restaurants: 2

Website
- https://www.onealdwych.com

One Aldwych is a five-star luxury hotel in London, England, founded by Gordon Campbell Gray. One Aldwych lies in the Aldwych in Covent Garden in City of Westminster.

== Exterior ==
The hotel is located in an Edwardian building known as Inveresk House, also called the Morning Post Building, constructed between 1907 and 1910 by the firm of Mewès and Davis, the same architects who designed The Ritz. It is located on the corner of The Aldwych and Wellington Street, adjacent to the Novello Theatre and opposite the London Transport Museum. The building stands roughly on the site of the old Gaiety Theatre, demolished in 1903 as part of the road widening of the East Strand and the Aldwych-Kingsway road development.

The building is noteworthy for being an early example of steel-framed construction in London, and is clad in grey Norwegian granite with a slate and copper roof, in an architectural blend of the Louis XVI and Louis XV styles, which was a specialty of Mewès and Davis' firm. Until 1937 the building was the headquarters of the Morning Post newspaper, from 1928 it housed the offices of both the Morning Post and the Illustrated London News. In 1928 two additional floors were added in the mansard roof, incorporating steep dormer windows.

The building received a Grade II Listing from Historic England in 1986. In 1998 the building was converted to a hotel by Jestico Whiles Associates, retaining the Edwardian facade.

== Interior ==
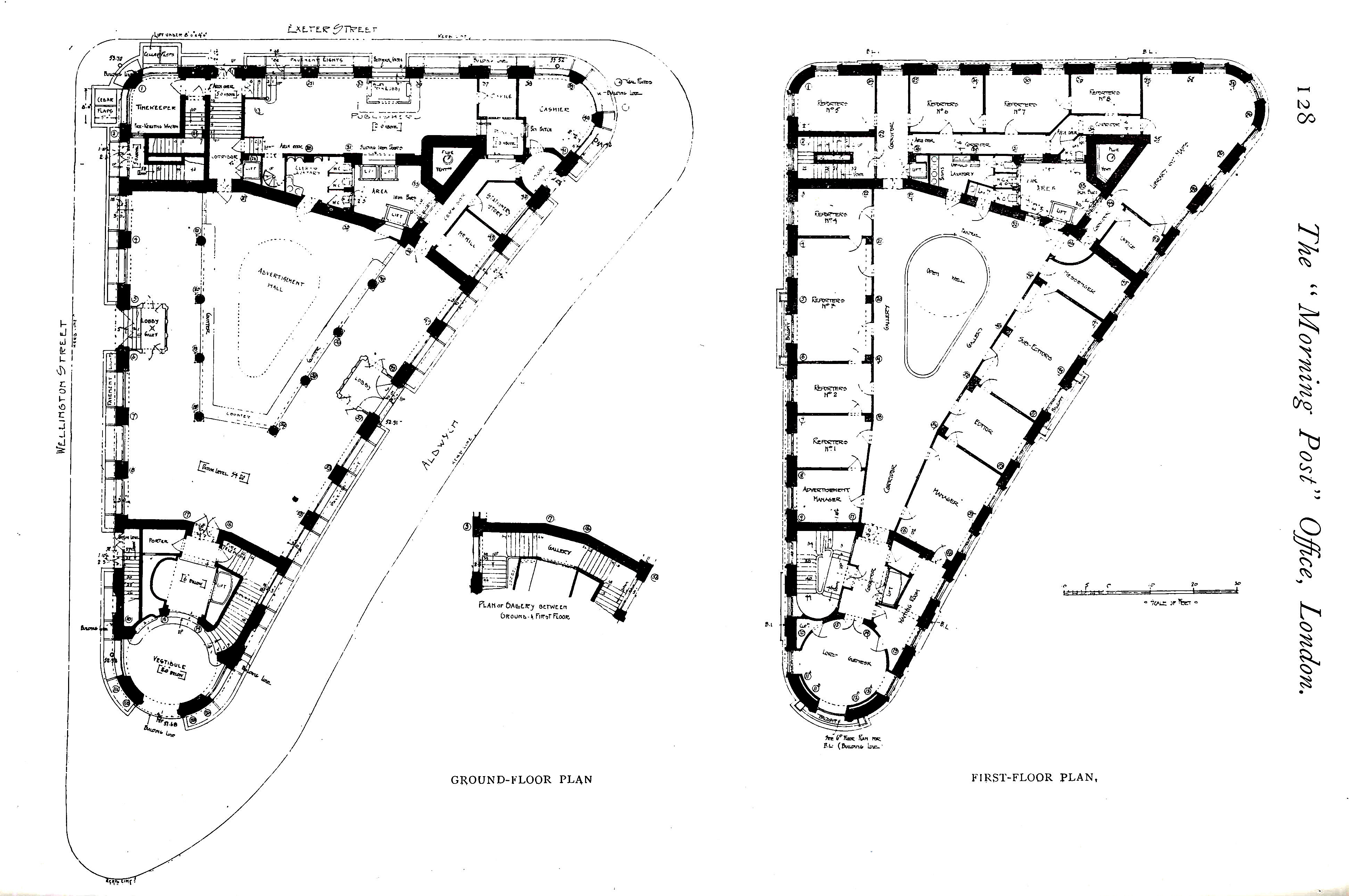
Plans of the building

=== Rooms ===
The hotel contains 100 rooms and suites. The rooms are described by Lonely Planet as being "spacious and stylish with raw silk curtains, natural tones and modern art, with bath tubs big enough for two".

The founder, Campbell Gray, has professed that the hotel is intended to be a classic hotel, not a boutique hotel or geared towards "young, trendy people", although the hotel does attract many fashionistas and West End aficionados under 40.

The hotel contains a 400 piece art collection purchased by Campbell Gray, featuring artists such as Cecilia Vargas, Richard Walker, Joost Beerents, Emily Young and Justine Smith.

=== Restaurants and bars ===
One Aldwych contains one restaurant, Indigo, as well as The Lobby Bar. Indigo serves modern British cuisine and is open every day. The Lobby Bar is where you go for afternoon tea, it features a Charlie and the Chocolate Factory themed tea.

The Lobby Bar is located in the grand high-ceilinged lobby which was once the reception area to the former newspaper building. It has been named one of the top five hotel bars in the world. The grand lobby has been described as "dramatic and aircraft-hangar-capacious with enormous polished oak arched windows." The Lobby Bar is noted for its cocktails.

=== Facilities ===
The hotel has a 56-foot (17 m) lap pool without chlorine, a sauna, steam room, therapy treatments and gym and also has a cinema for screening films at the weekend.
