= Cornwallis Academy =

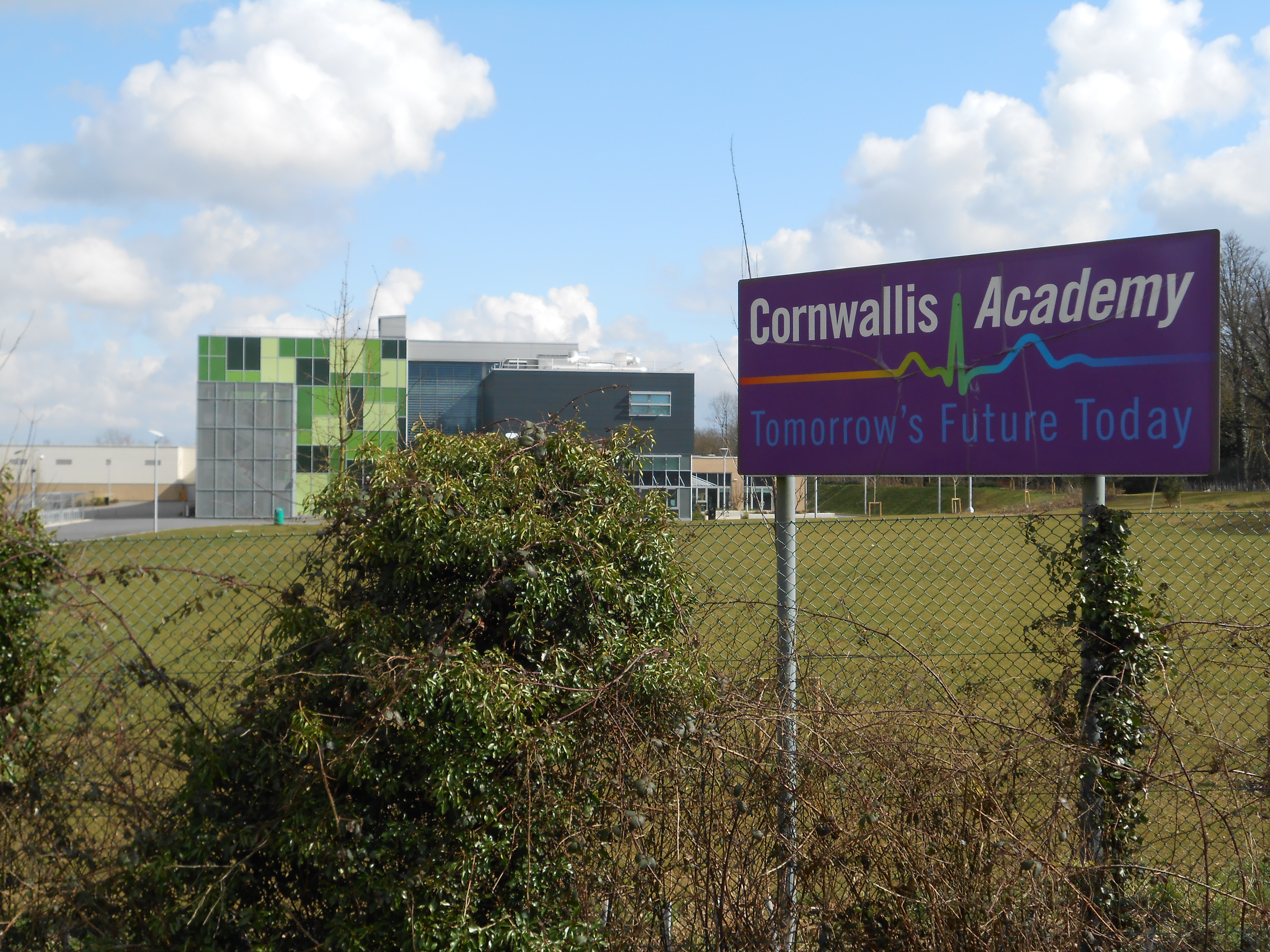

Location
- Hubbards Lane; Linton, Kent, ME17 4HX; England; 51.2303°N 0.5158°E

Information
- Type: Academy
- Motto: Ambitions For All
- Established: 1959
- Founder: Sir Nick Williams
- Department for Education URN: 135371 Tables
- Ofsted: Reports
- Head of School: Samantha McMahon
- Gender: Mixed
- Age: 11 to 18
- Enrolment: 1506 as of January 2015
- Colours: Purple, Black
- Website: http://www.cornwallisacademy.com

Cornwallis Academy (formerly The Cornwallis School) is a mixed-sex secondary school and sixth form located in Linton (near Maidstone) in the English county of Kent.

== History ==
The school converted to academy status on 3 September 2007 and was renamed Cornwallis Academy. The school is now sponsored by the Future Schools Trust, but it was previously a community school administered by Kent County Council. However, Cornwallis Academy continues to coordinate with Kent County Council for admissions.

The school relocated to a new building in September 2011, and has specialisms in language and science. Cornwallis operates the New Line Learning concept of education, and offers GCSEs and BTECs as programmes of study for pupils. Students in the sixth form have the option to study from a range of A Levels and further BTECs. Some sixth form courses were offered in conjunction with New Line Learning Academy. From September, 2017, sixth form courses for both New Line Learning Academy and Cornwallis Academy will be centralised at Cornwallis Academy.
