= New Line Learning Academy =

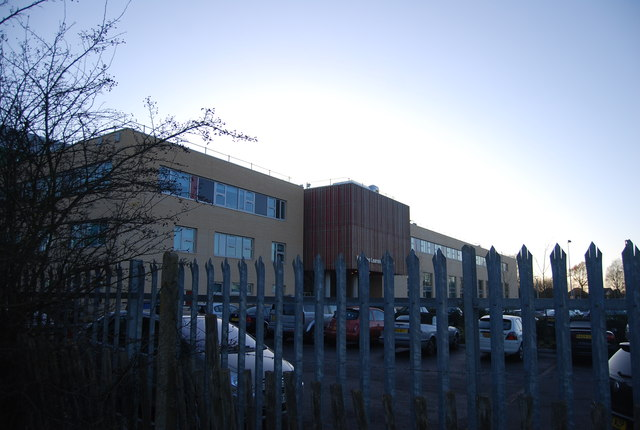

Location
- Boughton Lane; Loose, Kent, ME15 9QL; England
- 51.2494°N 0.5326°E

Information
- Type: Academy
- Motto: "Believe and Achieve"
- Religious affiliation: None (on site church)
- Department for Education URN: 135372 Tables
- Ofsted: Reports
- Headteacher: Gary Cook
- Gender: Coeducational
- Age: 11 to 16
- Capacity: 1050
- Colours: Green, Black, Grey
- Website: http://www.newlinelearning.com/

New Line Learning Academy is a coeducational secondary school in Loose, Kent, England. The school has academy status as part of the Future Schools Trust, which also includes the nearby Cornwallis Academy, Tiger Primary School, and Tiger Cubs Day Nursery.

== History ==
The school was formed as a result of a merger of Oldborough Manor Community School and Senacre Technology College. Previously a foundation school administered by Kent County Council (KCC), it converted to academy status in September 2007 and was renamed the New Line Learning Academy. The school continues to coordinate with KCC for the student admission process.

New Line Learning Academy offers GCSEs, BTECs, and NCFEs as study programmes. All sixth form courses previously located on the site have been moved to the neighbouring Cornwallis Academy. The school runs a Performing Arts School of Excellence program, aimed at promoting skills in drama, dance, music, and technical theatre. Students on this program can gain an RSL grade in musical theatre.

== Facilities ==
New Line Learning Academy relocated to a new building in 2010, which includes one of the largest indoor sports halls in Kent. The sports hall and school playing fields are used as the home ground of the Maidstone Pumas, an American football team currently playing in the National Division South Central Conference of the BAFA National Leagues (BAFANL).

A school farm accessible to students and members of the local community has been on the site for more than 70 years. Animals on the farm include cattle, sheep, goats, rabbits, a flock of poultry, and a donkey.
