= Paul Litherland =

Australian Cyber-Safety Educator

Paul Litherland OAM
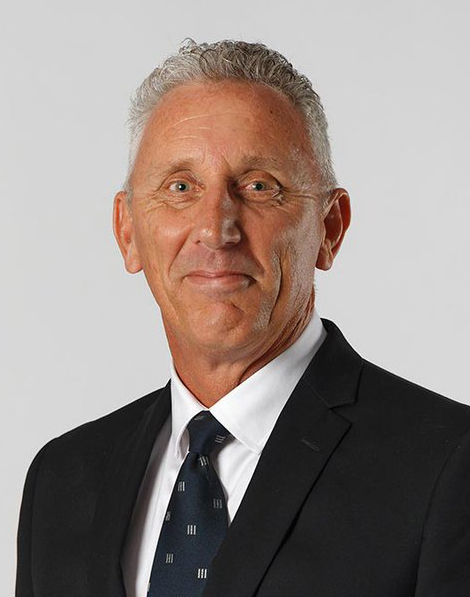
- Born: Albany, Western Australia
- Occupations: Cyber Safety Educator, Advocate, Mentor
- Organization(s): Surf Online Safe; Paul Litherland - InspireME
- Title: Ambassador - Auspire: Australia Day Council; Ambassador - Zonta House Refuge Association
- Awards: 2026 Medal of the Order of Australia (OAM); 2022: Australian of the Year (WA); 2021: Australian Small Business Champion Award; 2017: National Police Star Medal; 2016: National Service Medal; 2007: Pride of Australia Medal
- Website: https://litherland.com.au/

Paul Litherland OAM (born 1971) is an Australian cyber-safety educator, former Australian police officer, advocate and community campaigner. He is best known for his work in online safety education through his organisation Surf Online Safe, and for his advocacy surrounding cybercrime legislation, child protection and online harm prevention in Australia.

Litherland served for twenty years in the Western Australia Police Force, including six years within the Technology Crime Investigation Unit, where he investigated serious online offences and cyber related crime. Following his departure from policing in 2014, he established Surf Online Safe, becoming one of Australia’s most recognised cyber safety educators.

Litherland is an Australian of the Year Award. recipient, being named the WA Australian of the Year in 2022 in recognition of his work educating children, parents, schools and organisations about online safety and digital risk. In 2026, he was awarded a Medal of the Order of Australia. for service to community safety and youth education.

== Early life ==
Litherland was born in 1971 in Perth, Western Australia, the fourth of five children to his parents, Patricia and John. As a child, Litherland along with his siblings and mother, who was a Soprano in Western Australia, experienced severe domestic violence at the hands of his father. They lived in the suburb of Morley until 1972, after which his father, a WA Police Officer, was transferred to Collie, and then Albany in 1975.

Litherland spent most of his childhood in regional Western Australia, before his mother separated from his father and moved with him and his siblings to Perth in 1983. He attended Melville Senior High School for only a few months, before spending the rest of his schooling at Hamilton Senior High School.

In 2004, whilst still a serving Police Officer, Litherland was run over by a speeding vehicle on the Kwinana Freeway. He suffered severe spinal injuries and fractures, as well as a brain injury. He underwent six years of rehabilitation, during which he experienced severe depression and multiple suicide attempts as he struggled to come to terms with the impact of his injuries.

== Career and Work ==
=== Police Officer and Cyber Safety Educator ===
Litherland worked in the Western Australian Police Force between 1994 and 2014 in numerous fields including the Technology Crime Investigation Unit, between 2009 and 2014, in which he investigated serious online crimes. In 2012, Litherland initiated a Western Australian based education program in support of the juvenile victims and families he was dealing with as a Police Officer at Tech Crime. He designed and presented education sessions and training packages which were later adopted and utilised at a national level by the Australian Cyber Security Centre.

In 2014, Litherland left the police force having founded his cyber safety business, Surf Online Safe, a year earlier. With the increase in online harm and cyber crimes occurring across Australia at the time, there was a strong need for education. As such, the demand for Litherlands services increased significantly. Since 2012, he has provided cyber safety education nationally based on his experiences at Technology Crime, conducting presentations at over 850 schools and organisations across Australia. Between 2014 and 2025, Litherland had presented to well over half a million Australian children, remaining one of the countries most recognised educators.

=== Advisor and Mentor ===
As of 2024, Litherland has also been an in-house advisor at Emmanuel Catholic College in Western Australia, where he provides personalised advice and education to that school community.

=== AFL Coach ===
Since 2011, Litherland has also been heavily involved in the West Australian Football League. as a Senior Coach. From 2011 to 2013, he was a development and reserves coach at the East Perth Football Club., before moving to the South Fremantle Football Club. from 2013 to 2019 as the reserves coach and then as an assistant league coach under head coach Todd Curley.

Litherland has been a mentor and advisor to numerous high profile AFL players since 2010. Most notably he has been a mentor to former Richmond Football Club premiership player Marlion Pickett since Pickett was a teenager.

== Awards and recognition ==
Litherland has won multiple awards for his 30 years of service to the Australian community, including the 2022 WA Australian of the Year Award. He has also been awarded the 2021 Australian Small Business Champion, National Star medal, National Service medal, WA Police Service medal, and the Pride of Australia medal. Most recently, in 2026, Litherland was awarded a Medal of the Order of Australia.

== Advocacy ==
=== Intimate Image Abuse Legislation ===
Litherland has played a significant role in driving legislative and governmental responses to online harm. In 2019, he was the key campaigner for a legislative response in Western Australia to Intimate Image Abuse. After a five year campaign with two successive Attorney's General, Litherland was successful in having such laws introduced. The Criminal Law Amendment (Intimate Images) Act 2019, was enacted by the Western Australian Parliament in July of 2019 by then Attorney General of Western Australia, John Quigley.

=== Other Campaigns ===
Litherland has also played roles in the implementation of several other governmental and civil responses to online harm and cyber crime within Australia and internationally. He has authored evidence based submissions to the Australian Government and provided testimony to the Joint Select Committee on Social Media and Australian Society, as well as advising the Office of the eSafety Commissioner and the Committee overseeing the Online Safety Amendment (Social Media Minimum Age) Bill 2024.

=== Dante Arthurs ===
In November 2007, Dante Arthurs was convicted of the murder of eight-year-old Sofia Rodriguez-Urrutia Shu on June 26, 2006. Litherland was a parent at the school Sofia attended and assisted Sofia's family and the school in dealing with the crime. Whilst still a serving Police Officer, Litherland became a spokesperson for Sofia's parents and a lead fundraiser for a chapel built in Sofia's memory at her school.

In 2019, Arthurs was eligible for parole having served only 13 years in prison. Litherland initiated a petition for Arthurs to remain in custody, which gathered over one hundred thousand signatures in only a few weeks, and presented the petition to Attorney General John Quigley. Arthur's parole was subsequently rejected in 2019, again in 2022 and once more in 2025, with the petition continuing to gather over half a million signatures.
