= Maidstone Pumas =

Former American football team based in the United Kingdom (1997–2020)

Logo

General information
- Founded: 1997
- Stadium: New Line Learning Academy
- Headquartered: Maidstone

Personnel
- Head coach: Vacant since 2019

League / conference affiliations
- BAFA National Leagues; National Division South Central Conference

Current uniform

Home

The Maidstone Pumas was an American football team based in Maidstone, Kent. The team were formed in 1997 as a continuation of the former youth team of the same name, and now 2020 they have turned in their colours and folded.

== History ==
The Maidstone Pumas were first formed as a youth team that was active between 1988 and 1990, finishing as conference champions twice and losing to the Tiptree Titans in the BYAFA playoff final in 1990 the youth team continued for 7 more seasons in the youth league and entered Division Two the British Senior League the following year in 1998. They struggled to adapt and finished bottom of the South East conference, losing all ten of their regular season games and failing to score in six.

They were realigned into the Southern conference for their second season and on their third matchday they won their first senior game, a 27–0 win over the Chiltern Cheetahs. This was followed by a mixture of wins and narrow defeats, which included them completing a double over their local rivals, the Kent Exiles. They eventually finished fifth out of seven teams with a 4–5 record.

They were realigned once again for the 2000 into the five-team Eastern conference along with the Exiles and the Southend Sabres and eventually finished fourth with a 2–6 record. 2001 also saw the Pumas struggle, ending the season with a 1–7 record and only avoiding finishing bottom of their group by virtue of having conceded less points than the Kent Exiles.

It was decided that a period of rebuilding was needed, and so the club took a year out from senior competition in 2002. However, they continued to struggle upon their return to the BSL. In 2003, they finished bottom of the South East conference with a 1–9 record, and failed to win a single match in 2004, losing nine games and drawing one. The Pumas ended both the 2005 and 2006 seasons with a 2–8 record, whilst 2007 saw them lose every one of their ten games. In all, the Pumas lost 17 consecutive games, a streak which was ended on their first matchday of 2008 with a 13–12 victory over the Essex Spartans.

The 2009 season was marred by the death of offensive lineman Alan 'Minty' Newcombe, who collapsed on the sideline during the home match against the East Kent Mavericks on 16 August. His funeral was attended by hundreds of people, including his teammates who wore their team colours at the request of his family.

The 2011 season was a season of rebuilding, the Pumas won one game and had another awarded when the Norwich Devils pulled out of the league. The team lacked a head coach but were guided through the tough season by positional coaches, and the experienced players.

The 2012 season was a difficult one with the team unable to win games and finding themselves in the unfortunate position of having to forfeit the final 2 games of the season.

For 2013 the team have unveiled a new kit and a new Coach, Olly Dracup at the helm as they now find themselves in the National League South Central Conference.

The Pumas left the league in 2014 with a view to rebuild and develop the club.

In 2015 the Pumas played under associate status with the view of rejoining the league competing against other associate teams.

In 2016 the Pumas joined the league again under then HC Oli Dracup. The Pumas with a new squad would play the season ending with a 0–10 record. At the end of the season the clubs HC Oli Dracup would leave the club.

2017 would see the Pumas enter the league with new HC Simon Mackerill. The season would show progression under the new HC as they finished the season 2–8, winning games against the Hastings Conqourors and ending a long-term losing streak. The new-style offence saw the Pumas output improve greatly from previous years.

2018 saw the Pumas aligned to a different conference with some very strong teams and a new structure which saw the teams play in an 8-game season. The Pumas finished the season 1–7. At the end of the season. HC Simon Mackerill announced he was leaving the club.

2019 the Pumas finished the season 0–8 again but did show some development off the field recruiting several players and coaches.

In 2020 the season was cancelled due to the COVID-19 pandemic.

=== Senior team season records ===
Season	Division	W	L	T	PF	PA	Final position	Playoff record	Notes
1998	BSL Division Two South East	0	10	0	18	367	5 / 7	—	—
1999	BSL Division Two South	4	5	0	92	96	5 / 7	—	—
2000	BSL Division Two East	2	6	0	58	193	4 / 5	—	—
2001	BSL Division Two South	1	7	0	13	135	8 / 9	—	—
2002	DID NOT COMPETE								
2003	BSL Division Two South East	1	9	0	55	195	8 / 8	—	—
2004	BSL Division Two South East	0	9	1	32	289	6 / 6	—	—
2005	BAFL Division Two South East	2	8	0	46	300	5 / 5	—	—
2006	BAFL Division Two South	2	8	0	64	260	3 / 4	—	—
2007	BAFL Division Two South East	0	10	0	10	301	6 / 6	—	—
2008	BAFL Division Two South East	1	9	0	109	395	5 / 5	—	—
2009	BAFL Division Two South East	0	9	1	44	441	4 / 4	—	—
2010	BAFACL Division Two East	2	7	0	51	304	5 / 6	—	—
2011	BAFL Division Two East	2	8	0	72	476	6 / 7	—	—
2012	BAFL Division Two East	0	10	0	44	329	6 / 6	—	—
2013	BAFL Division Two East	0	7	0	6	423	6 / 6	—	—
2014	BAFL Division Two East	0	1	0	0	69	6 / 8	—	—
2014	BAFL Division Two East	0	0	0	0	0	6 / 6	—	—
2015	BAFL Division Two East	0	0	0	0	0	6 / 6	—	—
2016	BAFL Division Two East	0	0	0	0	0	6 / 6	—	—
2017	BAFL Division Two East	0	0	0	0	0	6 / 6	—	—
2018	BAFL Division Two East	0	0	0	0	0	6 / 6	—	—

== Other teams and activities ==
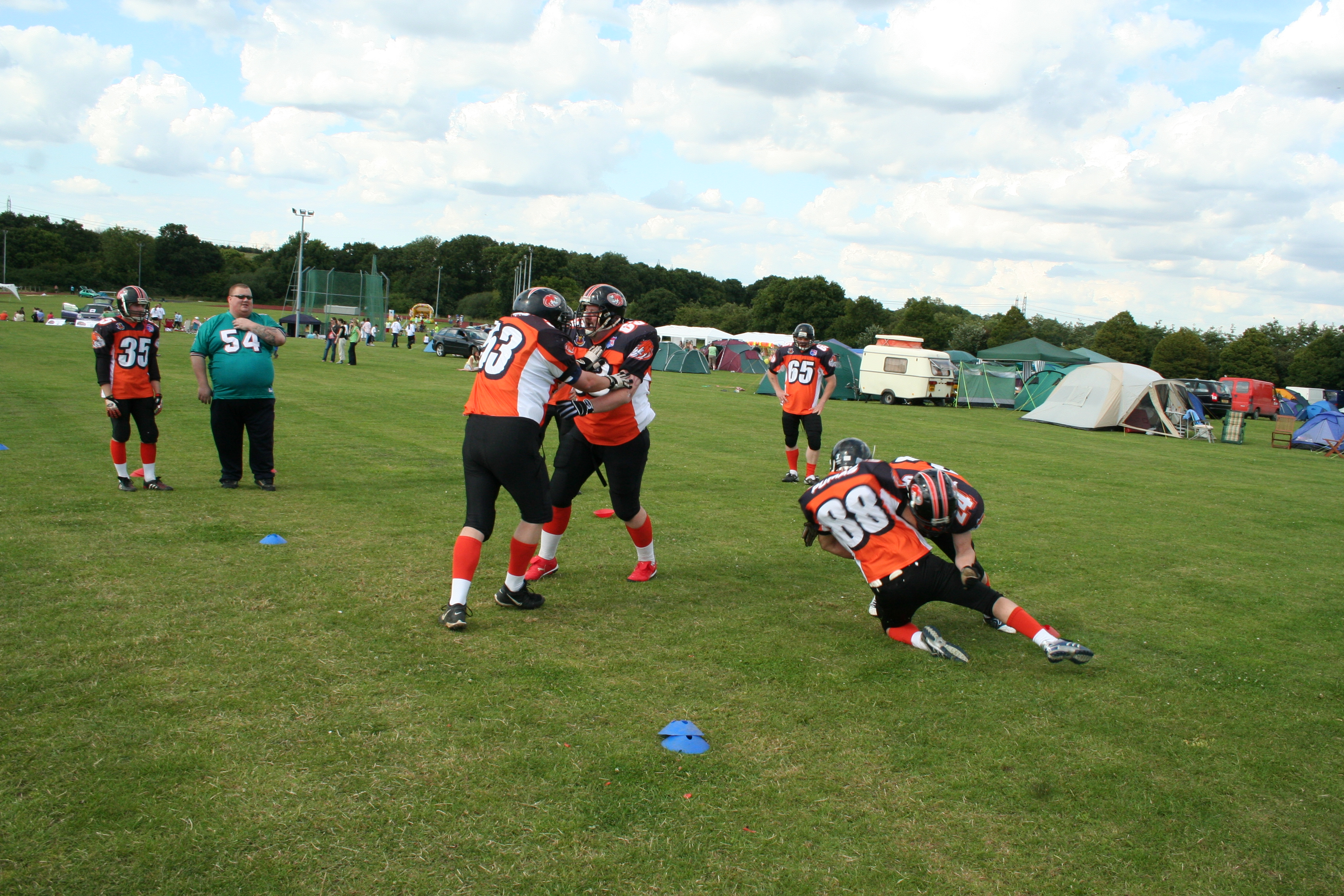
Tackling practice at the 'Relay for Life' event. Taken by Mark Lawrence

Though based in Maidstone, the Pumas have forged links in the Medway Towns. T

The Pumas have engaged in many charitable activities. At the 'Relay for Life' event, organised by Cancer Research UK, they gave a demonstration of American football and entered a team in the tug of war competition. The team also marshalled at the Breast Cancer Awareness 'Race for Life'.
