= Elly Barnes =

English activist

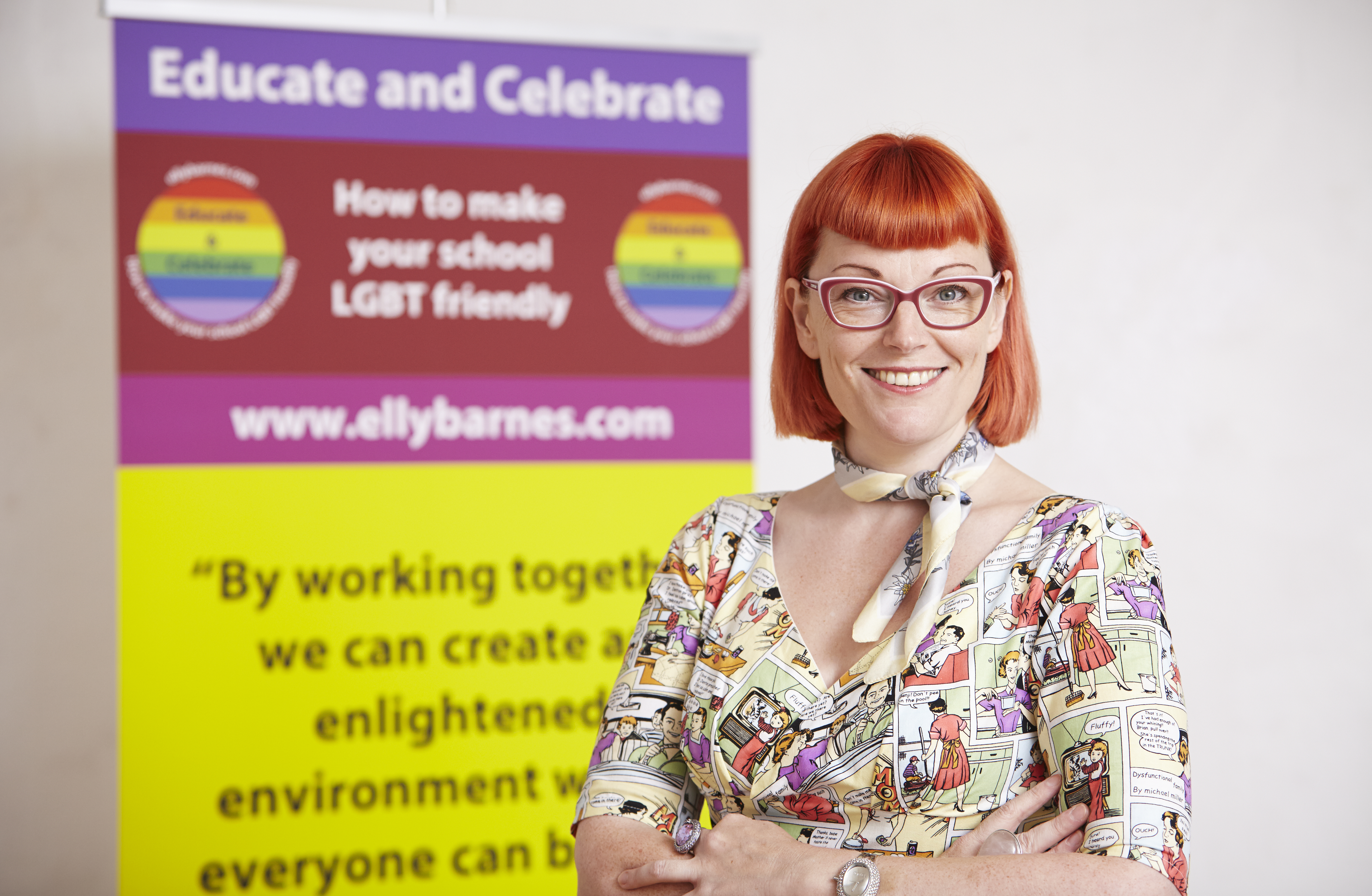
- Elly Barnes in 2013
- Born: Leicestershire, England
- Occupation: CEO
- Organization(s): Educate & Celebrate

Elly Barnes MBE FCCT was the founder and chief executive of the charity Educate & Celebrate.

== Education ==
Barnes attended Market Bosworth High School and then completed a degree in music, specialising in opera, at the Birmingham Conservatoire. She completed her Post Graduate Certificate of Education (PGCE) at the University of Birmingham. She had her Newly qualified teacher (NQT) year at The Barclay School in Stevenage whilst studying for a Diploma in Music Technology at Hertfordshire University. Barnes completed an MA in inclusive education at Goldsmiths University.

== Early LGBT+ work ==
Barnes first job was as a peripatetic singing teacher in Hertfordshire and London. She then obtained a permanent teaching role at Stoke Newington School in North London becoming Head of Year in 2005. That year, she began working towards eradicating homophobic, biphobic, and transphobic language and bullying. The approach taken was to educate young people about different gender identities and sexual orientations by introducing recognisable symbols of the LGBT+ community, famous LGBT+ people and the history of the LGBT+ struggle. The project developed into a school-wide celebration of LGBT+ History Month with an integrated curriculum.

== Educate & Celebrate ==
In 2010 Barnes developed her theory and practice into the ‘Educate & Celebrate’ PRIDE in Inclusion Award which incorporates teacher training, coaching and mentoring alongside a comprehensive resource programme to support schools, colleges, universities and organisations to build a future of inclusion and social justice.

After being listed at the top of The Independent on Sunday Rainbow List in 2011, Barnes developed the Educate & Celebrate program into full-time work. In 2012, she was also hired by the Birmingham City Council as an LGBT advisor for schools, and began distributing Educate and Celebrate curriculum for secondary schools as well as curriculum designed by Andrew Moffat for primary schools.

As part of the Educate & Celebrate campaign against discrimination, Barnes was invited to a Boarding Schools Association conference in 2015, and during her presentation, she advocated for staff training, updated equal opportunity and anti-bullying policies, expanded curriculum, and gender neutral uniform policies to help address discrimination against LGBT students.

== Selected works ==
- In 2018, Barnes and Anna Carlile published How to Transform Your School into an LGBT+ Friendly Place (Jessica Kingsley: ISBN 978-1785923494), a book suggesting best practices for school policies about bullying and equal opportunities.
- ABC Pride, by Louie Stowell and Elly Barnes, illustrated by Amy Phelps (DK Children: ISBN 978-0241572542)

== Honours and awards ==
- Voted Number 1 in the Independent on Sunday's Pink List in 2011 (now the Rainbow List), and was a judge in 2012.
- Ofsted Best Practice, 2012
- MBE, 2016
- Honorary doctorate from the University of Aberdeen, November 2016
- Activist of the Year 2018 award from Diva Magazine
