= Hempel Hotel =

Former luxury hotel in London, England

The Hempel Hotel

- Location within Central London

General information
- Location: 31-35 Craven Hill Gardens, London, England, United Kingdom
- Coordinates: 51°30′46″N 0°10′56″W
- Closed: January 2013

Other information
- Number of rooms: 50
- Number of restaurants: 1

The Hempel Hotel was a luxury 5-star hotel in London, England. It was located at 31-35 Craven Hill Gardens to the north of Hyde Park off Bayswater Road. It was a small boutique hotel with Zen inspiration, designed by Anouska Hempel. The design of each of the 40 rooms and 10 apartments centered on minimalistic art and the colour white, and it also featured a zen garden.

The hotel was a favourite of Victoria Beckham and of Michael Jackson, who reserved the entire hotel during a stay there in 2006.

The hotel was sold in January 2013 to British Land before being demolished to make way for 18 luxury apartments, opened in 2016.
