= Martin Litherland =

English geologist (born 1945)

Martin Litherland OBE (born 1945, Woking, England) is a geologist who has travelled and published widely.

== Life and career ==
Martin Litherland poses at the source of the Rio Verde in the upper reaches of the Lost World in 1981.

Litherland was born in 1945, the son of a Methodist minister.

In 1970 he was awarded a PhD by Liverpool University on the stratigraphy and structure of the Dalradian rocks around Loch Creran, Scotland, which resolved the major stratigraphic puzzle. The rocks also contained early forms of animal life.

He joined the (present) British Geological Survey (BGS). He was seconded to the Botswana Geological Survey (1970–1975). During this time he mapped the Maitengwe-Sebina area of Rhodesian (now Zimbabwe) Craton where a new uniformitarian theory was proposed; he also mapped the Mamuno-Kalkfontein area of the Ghanzi Ridge. Precambrian life forms were found, and rock engravings were reported.

Litherland was Senior Exploration Geologist for the Eastern Bolivia Mineral Exploration Project (1976–1985), an ODA Technical Cooperation project covering the unexplored Bolivian part of the Brazilian Shield under difficult conditions. The Lost World of Fawcett/Conan Doyle was also mapped. He noted Andean-trending structures and discovered alkaline igneous rocks.

From 1986 to 1992, Litherland was Team Leader of the Cordillera Real Geological Research Project in Ecuador. The Project mapped the eastern Andean cordillera along a series of difficult traverses and discovering many 'un-Andean' geological features.

He was awarded the OBE in 1993.

From 1993 until retirement in 2000, Litherland worked in the Keyworth office of the British Geological Survey. He launched a series of popular geological publications in the form of tourist and fossil guides, books and posters.

After retirement, he taught English and Spanish; and published poems related to his geological career; his childhood; religion; and Richard 111; as well as short stories.
