= TeamUWS =

Sports union of the University of the West of Scotland

Team UWS
- University: University of the West of Scotland
- Association: BUCS
- Conference: Scottish Conference
- President: Johnathan Cranstoun
- Location: Paisley, Hamilton and Ayr
- Sports: 26
- Mascot: Francesca 'Frankie' the Phoenix
- Colors: Red and Black
- Website: www.sauws.org.uk/getinvolved/teamuws/

Team UWS is the sports union of the University of the West of Scotland in Scotland, UK, and competes in Scottish Student Sport and the Scottish Conference of BUCS. The American football team plays in the Scottish/Northern 2A league.

== History ==
Originally formed as SAUWS Sports and Societies in 2008, the sports union was rebranded as Team UWS during 2013. Previous to the formation of SAUWS, the students associations of the former University of Paisley and Bell College were responsible for sports provision. The larger of the two, the University of Paisley Students Association, was formed from those of Craigie College of Education in Ayr and Paisley College of Technology and had a considerable number of clubs including Ice Hockey, Shinty, Gaelic Football and Curling. During the 2008/09 academic session attempts were made by Scandinavian and German students to resurrect the Ice Hockey team but failed due to lack of interest the club. Other attempts to recreate former sports clubs included American Football during the 2004–05 British Collegiate American Football League season as the Pyros. The team originally competed as the Paisley College of Technology/University of Paisley Panthers American Football between the 1989–90 British Collegiate American Football League and the 1996–97 British Collegiate American Football League seasons.

== Sports sponsored ==
BUCS

- Archery
- UWS Pyros American Football Team
- Badminton
- Basketball
- Football
- Golf
- UWS Hockey Club
- Netball
- UWS RFC
- Volleyball
- Track & Field (Indoor & Outdoor)

Scottish Student Sport

- Badminton
- Basketball
- Boxing
- Curling
- Football
- Hockey
- Judo
- Netball
- Rugby Union
- Volleyball

== UWS Sports Scholarship Programme ==
Run by the University, the sport scholarships programme aims to support those with the potential to be at the top of their sport internationally and nationally combining it with academic achievement to help student-athletes achieve their full potential whilst raising the profile and reputation of the University in the sporting and academic arenas. Those who are on the programme are encouraged to attend UWS sports events and support Team UWS participation; to compete for Scottish Universities when selected and available.

== Traditions and rivalries ==
Team UWS's most notable rivalry is with Edinburgh Napier University which compete’s against in the East vs West Varsity. Other rivalries include Glasgow University in Rugby and American Football competitions.

== Notable alumni ==
- Kirsty Gilmour, Badminton Player for Scotland and Great Britain
- Vicki Adams, Team GB Curler
- Aileen Neilson, Paralympian
- Fraser Hirst, Scottish National Hockey Team
- Tom Hiddleston, Scottish Universities Rugby player 2008 and 2010

== Hall of Fame ==
- Struan Tonnar, Ice Hockey (2014)
- Rachel Hunter, Athletics (2015)
