= Fishnet (novel) =

2015 novel by Kirstin Innes

- First edition cover
- Author: Kirstin Innes
- Publisher: Freight Books
- Publication date: July 1, 2015
- Award: Not the Booker Prize (2015)
- ISBN: 9781910449066

Fishnet is the debut novel of Kirstin Innes, published in 2015 by Freight Books. The story follows a Scottish woman who, after learning her missing sister was working as a sex worker, sets out to examine the sex industry. Fishnet was the winner of The Guardian's Not the Booker Prize 2015. Innes spoke about the book at the 2015 Edinburgh International Book Festival.

In August 2018, Fishnet was re-published by Black & White Publishing, following the liquidation of Freight Books in December 2017.

== Background ==
Innes conducted three years of research to complete Fishnet. Along with online research, she conducted interviews with sex workers and sex workers' rights activists and advocates. Innes had admitted that before researching the Scottish sex industry, she maintained the common misconception that all sex workers are victims. In an interview with The List, she stated that in 2009, she thought being a sex worker meant that person was "a victim, a poor soul, probably a drug addict, a sad indictment of our patriarchal society". After further research, Innes stated that her "politics were completely flipped on their heads".

== Plot summary ==
Twenty-year-old Rona Leonard leaves her sister Fiona's flat and disappears. Six years later, Fiona lives a mundane existence, struggling through a tedious office job and child care. Her life suddenly changes when she learns Rona was working as a sex worker. On a journey to uncover the truth about her sister, Fiona investigates the sex industry and meets with sex workers. Her misconceptions of the sex industry are challenged, and what she uncovers changes her life forever.

== Reception ==
Fishnet won the Guardian's 2015 Not the Booker Prize.

Fishnet has been praised for its use of dialogue and Scottish vernacular, and criticised for its use of present tense and "lectures on prostitution in the guise of blog entries". However, The Herald's Iain Macwhirter applauded the ways the novel challenged public misconceptions about sex workers as victims, and Irish sex worker rights activist Laura Lee, writing for The Huffington Post, praised Innes's nuanced representation of sex workers. James Kidd, writing for The Independent, called Fishnet "unsettling and seductive" and compared it to Trainspotting, Irvine Welsh's 1993 novel about Scottish heroin users, as it portrays a "clandestine world [...] against the every day".

The Independent included Fishnet on its list of 2015's "top 10 debut fiction books".
