= Far Canals =

Irish band

The Far Canals were an early 1990s band based in Galway, Ireland consisting of Frank X. Hibbet (vocals/guitar), Vlad (bass) and God the Father (drums). They were managed by Olaf Tyaransen and released two albums and one EP with Hunter S. Records. The band's anarchic, anti-establishment ethos was reflected in many of their songs which railed against the police, drug laws, organised religion and political corruption. Influenced by punk and blues, the Far Canals combined unusual guitar arrangements and distortion pedals to produce a highly distinctive sound. The band regularly played in bars and clubs around Galway such as Monroes (where If You See K was launched on 14 November 1994) and the Róisín Dubh. The group disbanded in 1996. The band produced a video for their single “When I was Out of My Head” which was played on RTÉ’s No Disco and, according to their former manager, Larry Gogan was the first DJ to play their music on the radio.

== Discography ==
=== Albums ===
Grey Slant

1. "In the Morning"
2. "Delicatessan"
3. "Contemplating Contempt"
4. "Dobra Peach KA"
5. "The Heavenly 10 Step"
6. "La Salsa dela Muerta"
7. "Money King"
8. "Bigger than Me"

If You See K

1. "Really Real"
2. "In Pursuit of Happiness"
3. "I Didn’t Get Where I am Today"
4. "Way Out West Past Rosaveal"
5. "When I Was Out of My Head"
6. "Mothers Milk Express"
7. "Sniffer Dog"
8. "The Fear of Fear Itself"
9. "Dark Dreams"
10. "Godless Lawless"
11. "Denying There’s a War On"
12. "Angry"
13. "Glorious"

=== E.Ps ===
All Fluffed Up

1. "Glorious"
2. "Mothers Milk Express"
3. "USA 94"
4. "Way Out West Past Rosaveal"
