= Freight Books =

Defunct British publisher

Freight Books was an independent publisher based in Glasgow. It published books for an English speaking readership, including award-winning literary fiction, poetry, illustrated non-fiction and humour. Freight Books was named Scotland's Publisher of the Year 2015 by the Saltire Society. Freight Books published the debut novel of Martin Cathcart Froden, the winner of the 2015 Dundee International Book Prize.

The company was founded as an imprint of Freight Design by Adrian Searle in 2011. The publisher increased its output each year, at its peak publishing 35 titles in 2016, with notable publications including Gutter magazine, a Scottish magazine of new writing established in 2009 (and still in existence), Jellyfish by Janice Galloway and the international bestseller The Hairdresser of Harare by Tendai Huchu.

Freight Books acquired Cargo Publishing in September 2015.

In April 2017 Searle left the business citing "differences over strategic direction" between himself and fellow director Davinder Samrai. Two months later Freight Books was offered for sale through the Publishing Scotland website. The company was finally liquidated that December and it disappeared from the Scottish Publishing scene after failing to find a suitable buyer. Authors left the publishing house with unpaid royalties.

== Notable authors and works ==
- Janice Galloway:
  - Jellyfish (2015), shortlisted for the Saltire Society Literary Award in Literary Fiction, long-listed for the Frank O'Connor International Short Story Award
- Pippa Goldschmidt:
  - The Falling Sky (2013), runner-up in the 2012 Dundee International Book Prize
  - The Need for Better Regulation of Outer Space (2015), longlisted for the Frank O'Connor International Short Story Award
  - I Am Because You Are (2015), as an editor
- Kirstin Innes:
  - Fishnet (2015), Winner of the Guardian Not the Booker Prize
- J David Simons:
  - A Woman of Integrity (2017)

== Prizes ==
2015: Freight won publisher of the year by the Saltire Society.

2015: Killochries by Jim Carruth shortlisted for the Saltire Society Scottish Poetry Book of the Year Award.

2015: Lifeblood by Gill Fyffe shortlisted for the Saltire Society Scottish Non-Fiction Book of the Year Award.

2015: Jellyfish by Janice Galloway shortlisted for the Saltire Society Scottish Fiction Book of the Year Award.

2015: Fishnet by Kirsten Innes won the Guardian Not the Booker Prize.

2012: The Falling Sky by Pippa Goldschmidt was runner-up in the Dundee International Book Prize.

2012: Furnace by Wayne Price longlisted for the Frank O'Connor Prize and nominated for the Saltire Scottish First Book of the Year.

2010: Gutter won the Chairman's Award at the Scottish Design Awards.
