= University of the West of Scotland =

Public research university in south-western Scotland

- Coat of Arms
- Former names: University of Paisley; Bell College
- Motto: Latin: Doctrina Prosperitas
- Motto in English: Learning is success
- Type: Public university
- Established: 1897 (as Paisley College of Technology); 1992 (granted university status); 2007 (renamed to UWS)
- Affiliations: MillionPlus; Scottish Universities Physics Alliance; Universities UK; EUA
- Chancellor: Yekemi Otaru
- Principal: James A Miller
- Administrative staff: 1,300
- Students: 19,105 (2024/25)
- Undergraduates: 12,760 (2024/25)
- Postgraduates: 6,345 (2024/25)
- Campus: Scotland: Paisley, Hamilton, Dumfries and Ayr England: London
- Colours
- Website: uws.ac.uk

The University of the West of Scotland (Scottish Gaelic: Oilthigh na h-Alba an Iar), formerly the University of Paisley, is a public university with four campuses in south-western Scotland, in the towns of Paisley, Blantyre, Dumfries and Ayr, as well as a campus in London, England. The present institution dates from August 2007, following the merger of the University of Paisley with Bell College, Hamilton. It can trace its roots to the late 19th century, and has undergone numerous name changes and mergers over the last century, reflecting its gradual expansion throughout the west of Scotland region.

The university currently has 16,105 students, with approximately 1300 staff, spread across four schools of learning. The Crichton Campus in Dumfries is maintained in partnership with a number of other institutions, including the University of Glasgow.

== History ==
=== Origins of the University of Paisley ===
At the time of the Industrial Revolution, Paisley was renowned for thread weaving. The Coats mill was run by two brothers, Peter and Thomas Coats. These men, children of the Scottish Enlightenment, had liberal ideals and became noted philanthropists. As members of the Philosophical Institution, founded in 1808 the Coats donated a museum and library to the town, funded the building of the Coats observatory and promoted education throughout Paisley.

The Philosophical Institution, helped establish the School of Arts in 1836, which became a Government School of Design in 1846, one of twenty similar institutions established in UK manufacturing centres from 1837 to 1851. They were set up to improve the quality of the country's product design through training in design for industry. Peter Coats was director of both Paisley Philosophical Institution and the Government School of Design. Later, the Design schools were renamed Schools of Art, and once again as Schools of Art and Science.

In 1897 Princess Louise, Duchess of Argyll laid the foundation stone of a grand new building for the college. The design was the winner of an architectural competition and partially funded by local industrialists (Peter Brough and Thomas Coats both contributed).

By the start of the twentieth century, Paisley Technical College and School of Art, (as it was known from 1904) was a centre for teaching the University of London External Programme. Perhaps the most famous principal of the college was Lewis Fry Richardson, FRS principal from 1922 to 1940. A mathematician, physicist, meteorologist, psychologist and pacifist who pioneered modern mathematical techniques of weather forecasting, as well as the application of similar techniques to studying war. He also carried out ground breaking work on fractals.

Throughout the first half of the century the institution had a financial struggle. After the second world war Central Institution status provided a regular Government income but unfortunately also meant closing the school of Art, and ceding students to Glasgow School of Art. The new entity thus became Paisley College of Technology; a Government funded Central Institution in 1950. In the 1960s a large physical expansion took place alongside the Neo-Classical original building on the main 20-acre (8-hectare) Paisley town centre site.

At the time Paisley, in common with other Central Institutions and the former Polytechnics, already offered a range of degrees under the Council for National Academic Awards. With the Further and Higher Education Act 1992, the Paisley College of Technology was granted the title University of Paisley and was established as a university with a royal charter and degree awarding powers.

=== Merger with Craigie College of Education ===
The establishment of the University of Paisley prompted a merger with Craigie College of Education in Ayr in 1993, and led to the incorporation of nursing colleges in the town. The Ayr Campus was operated by the University of Paisley before the merger that established UWS. Set in 20 acres (8 hectares) of the old parkland of Craigie House bordering the River Ayr, the campus also houses the West of Scotland Management Centre, the business school's management training and development facility.

=== University of the West of Scotland ===
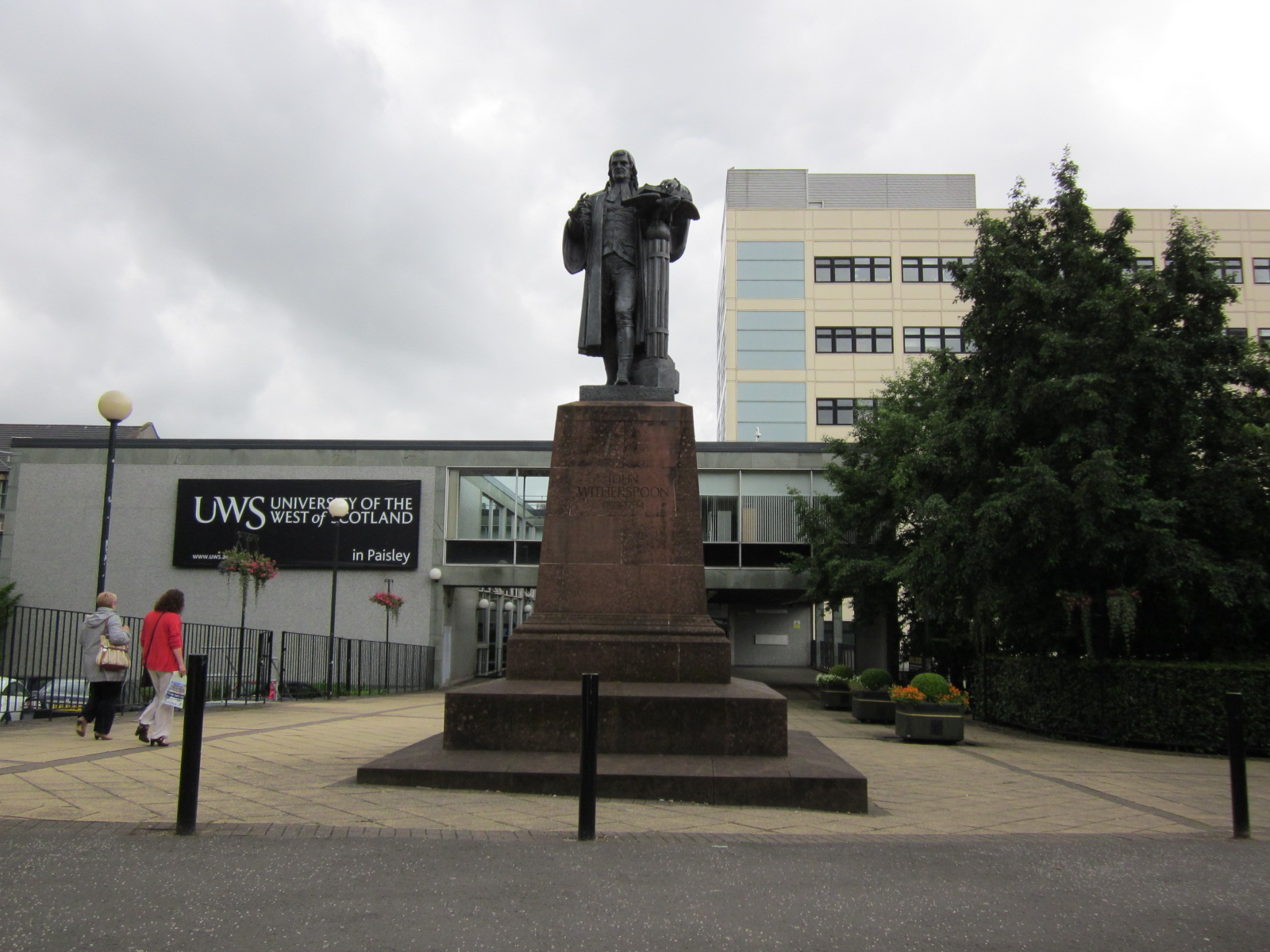
UWS Paisley Campus

On 1 August 2007, the University of Paisley merged with Bell College, Hamilton. On 30 November 2007, the Privy Council approved the name University of the West of Scotland for the merged institution. The name change was resisted by many in Paisley, seeing it as a break with tradition and the connections binding the previous university to the town. The 'Keep It Paisley' campaign attracted a number of supporters, amongst them local MP and then Secretary of State for Scotland, Douglas Alexander.

Today the University of the West of Scotland has over 15,000 students and remains one of Scotland's largest 'new universities'.

The university reported a cyber incident that happened in July 2023 which affected its systems and staff data. It was reported that the attack affected staff laptops, half of the university's systems, and student submissions. The hacking group Rhysida put the stolen information which reportedly contained staff's personal details and internal university documents.

== Campuses ==
=== Paisley ===
The Paisley campus of the University of the West of Scotland is situated in the centre of Paisley, Scotland's largest town. The campus is home to roughly 10,000 students of the universities enrolment, offering a range of courses and research opportunities in areas such as business, computing, social sciences, engineering, science and health, nursing and midwifery. Student accommodation at the Paisley campus is provided in a recently opened £13.2 million student residence development. The Paisley campus of the university spans 20 acres (8 hectares) and consists of four University of the West of Scotland academic schools.

=== Ayr ===
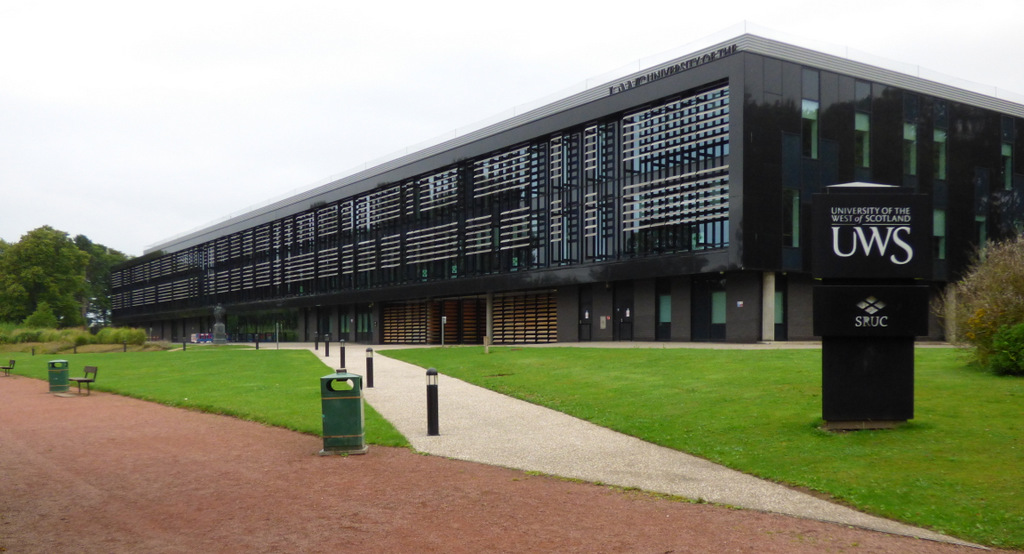
UWS Ayr Campus

In August 2011, a new campus for the university in Ayr opened on a riverside site adjacent to the previous campus. It is shared with the Scotland's Rural College. The campus was constructed at a cost of £81 million, and provides the Ayrshire region of Scotland with "one of the UK's most modern, environmentally friendly and sustainable higher education learning facilities". The design of the campus building was taken from inspiration of the surrounding land and environment in Ayr, with the university claiming that the campus provides students with a "stunning space for study".

The Ayr campus has its own student accommodation facilities on site, with student accommodation buildings located roughly three minutes away from the main campus. The accommodation has the capacity to house up to 200 students.

=== Lanarkshire ===
The Hamilton campus was previously based at Almada Street, Hamilton, South Lanarkshire previously known Bell College of Technology, before its merger with the University of Paisley.

Following extensive consultation with the local authority, stakeholders, students and staff about the future of the Hamilton campus, UWS announced plans to relocate to the new UWS Lanarkshire Campus at Hamilton International Technology Park (HITP), within the neighbouring town of Blantyre, off the A725 bypass road near to West Craigs. The Almada Street campus closed and the HITP campus opened in September 2018.

=== Dumfries ===
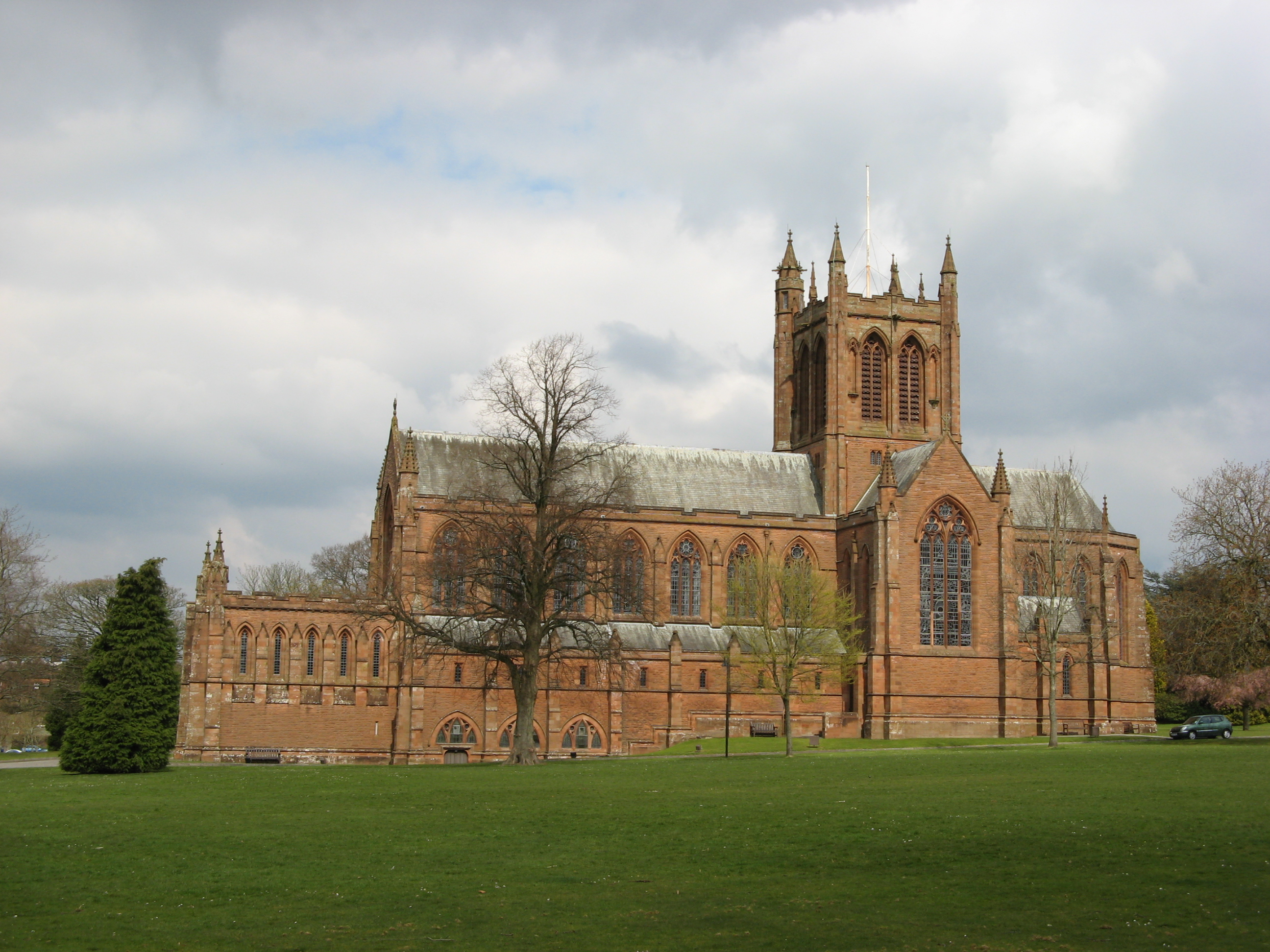
Crichton Memorial Church, completed in 1897, at the Crichton University Campus in Dumfries

The university's Dumfries campus is a compact multi-institution facility located within the Crichton estate, a historic 85-acre (34-hectare) parkland estate two miles (three kilometres) from the centre of Dumfries. It was borne from the amalgamation with South West School of Nursing and Hamilton's Bell College and was Joined by Paisley University, the University of Glasgow and latterly by Dumfries College. The UWS campus has state-of-the-art learning facilities, experienced staff and currently operates within a building shared by Dumfries College. A range of flexible full and part-time study opportunities are offered. The university claims that students benefit from 'small class sizes, low staff: student ratios and a supportive and friendly study environment.' The Crichton University Campus in Dumfries is the result of a joint project between the University of the West of Scotland, the University of Glasgow, Dumfries and Galloway College and the Open University. The campus mainly offers computing, social work and, since the merger with Bell College, Adult and Mental Health nursing courses. Established in 1999 to provide a hub for higher education in the south-west of Scotland, the Crichton Campus has helped the regeneration of the Dumfries and Galloway economy.

=== London ===
The London Campus is currently located in the East India Docks area of London Docklands. It was launched in March 2016 and provides UWS degree and postgraduate programmes to the international student population in London.

== Organisation ==
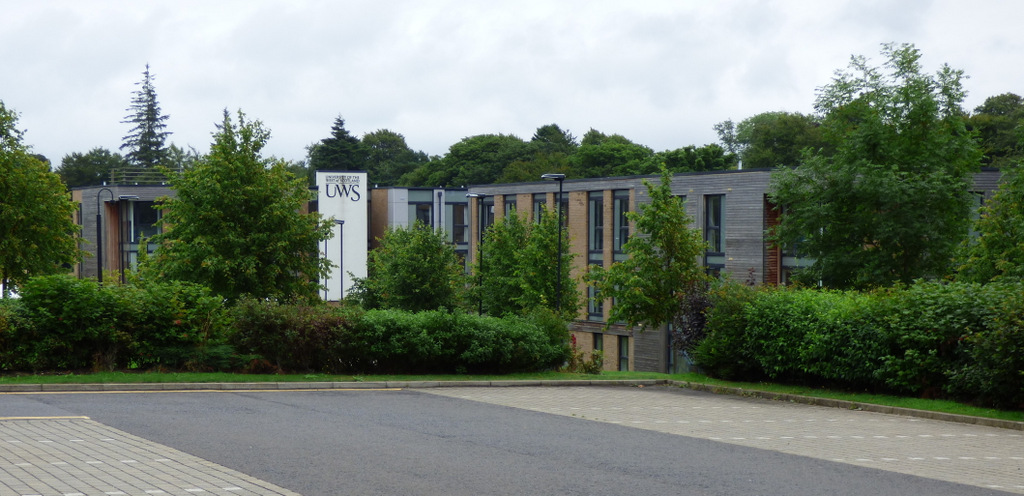
Student accommodation at UWS Ayr campus

The University of the West of Scotland is organised into four schools:

- School of Business and Creative Industries
- School of Computing, Engineering and Physical Sciences
- School of Education and Social Sciences
- School of Health and Life Sciences

The university offers over 100-degree courses at undergraduate and postgraduate level, and has a rapidly growing number of doctoral students. It also carries out research and consultancy work for industry, and is ranked second in Scotland for the number of Knowledge Transfer Partnerships with businesses. The university attained Skillset Media Academy status in August 2010. Many courses at the University of the West of Scotland have an emphasis on vocational skills and offer students the option of spending a year working in industry at home or abroad.

The university has also worked with NHS Ayrshire and Arran resulting in a partnership in 2012 in the renaming of Ayr Hospital to University Hospital Ayr and Crosshouse Hospital to University Hospital Crosshouse, a hospital which is based in nearby Kilmarnock. Its partnership with the Gaiety Theatre, Ayr has established Scotland's first 'Learning Theatre'.

=== Rankings and reputation ===
Rankings
National rankings
- Complete (2027): 127
- Guardian (2027): 123
- Times / Sunday Times (2027): 110

Global rankings
- THE (2026): 601–800

University of the West of Scotland (UWS) has been named the top young higher education institution in Scotland in the prestigious THE World University Rankings 2020 league table. The university retains its place with in the 101–150 division of the Times Higher Education Young University Rankings.

UWS is Scotland's leading university for widening access to students from disadvantaged backgrounds.

UWS is also a sector leader in course articulation, and is committed to articulating over 1,200 students with advanced standing each year.

The university has the 4th highest level of student satisfaction in Scotland in the 2020 Complete University Guide The university is ranked second in the United Kingdom for Education in the 2020 Complete University Guide.

== Student life ==
=== Student accommodation ===
The university has a number of halls of residence, ranging from modern en-suite/studio flats at Ayr Campus to furnished flats within Paisley. Students at Dumfries may apply for a place within the University of Glasgow managed accommodation at the Crichton. In September 2012, the new £13.2 million on-campus Paisley student residence opened situated next to the library.

=== Student associations ===
==== SAUWS ====
Students' Association of the University of the West of Scotland (SAUWS)
- Location: Paisley, Hamilton and Ayr, Scotland
- Established: 1971
- President: Ellie Gomersall
- Vice presidents: Vice President Education: Kevin Miguim Vice President Student Development: Claire Morris Vice President Welfare and Wellbeing: Luke Humberstone
- Affiliations: National Union of Students
- Website: www.uwsunion.org.uk

The Students' Association of the University of the West of Scotland is officially the recognised student organisation across the university. The organisation exists to campaign on students' issues, to improve learning and teaching at UWS, to offer advice and support to students, to organise events and activities, and to enable societies across all campuses.

The majority of the Student Groups and Societies are available to Scottish-based UWS campuses and are run by students for students. These include religious, political and social societies as well as course-based groups. There are also a collection of liberation groups and peer support groups, which exist to counter under-represented and oppressed sections of the student body.

SAUWS operates Union bars at their Paisley and Ayr locations, where they host various events and activities including quiz nights and karaoke.

In 2016 SAUWS won the NUS Scotland award "Higher Education Student Association of the Year". This was awarded due to the organisations work and campaigns such as Keep UWS in Hamilton, the Summer Safety Net campaign, and its work developing services for students. SAUWS was awarded "University Students' Association of the Year" by NUS Scotland once again in 2020.

==== CUCSA ====
Crichton University Campus Student Association also serves students at the Dumfries Campus.

For students at Dumfries, CUCSA has a more limited range of sports and societies on offer and CUCSA is currently working with students to produce a new Netball club, both Boys and Girls Football clubs and an improved Riding Club.

=== Radio ===
The Ayr Campus is also home to the university's student radio station UWS Radio. It broadcasts on DAB, 87.7FM to the campus and online. The station has interviewed greats such as Brian May from Queen and Jesse Rae. UWS also produces and teaches podcasts including the Research Matters series

=== Sports ===
Sporting affairs are regulated by TeamUWS, the Sports and Societies branch of the main Students Association headed by the Sports President. There are a large number of varied clubs, including Aikido, Basketball, Curling and Snowsports who regularly compete in BUCS and Scottish Student Sport competitions. Students who join one of the sports clubs affiliated with the university must also join the Sports Union. However, there are also regular classes and drop-in sessions for various sports which are non-competitive and available to all university gym members. The university operates two sports centres across the west of Scotland, Robertson Trust Sports Centre at Thornly Park Campus in Paisley and Hamilton Leisure Centre on site on Hamilton Campus.

The university, as the University of Paisley, has also had a number of previous clubs including Ice Hockey, Shinty, Gaelic Football and Ice Sports. There have been attempts in recent years to resurrect these teams, most notably the Paisley IcePanthers, the university's former ice hockey team in 2008 by Finnish and German students, but due to lack of interest the club never happened. The most successful of all the resurrections was the American Football team. The Paisley College of Technology/University of Paisley Panthers American Football played between the 1989–90 British Collegiate American Football League and the 1996–97 British Collegiate American Football League seasons until the club rejoined as the University of Paisley Pyros at the start of the 2004–05 British Collegiate American Football League season.

TeamUWS competes in the East vs West varsity competition against Edinburgh Napier University in the sports of American Flag Football, Badminton, Basketball, Football, Hockey, Netball, Rugby and Volleyball which is at the moment the biggest sport club (2017). In the 2013/2014 competition the hockey games were cancelled due to location and weather difficulties.

According to the Scottish Daily Record, it is rumoured that South Ayrshire Council is considering giving the dated Dam Park Stadium, the venue for UWS-SRUC-Ayrshire College Varsity, to the university saving nearly £70,000. As part of the transfer, the facility will continue to be used by Ayr Seaforth AC and the local community.

== Notable people ==
- Michelle Mone - Awarded an honorary doctorate in 2002.
- Vicki Adams — Team GB curler
- Shamshad Akhtar — executive secretary of United Nations Economic and Social Commission for Asia and the Pacific
- Gilbert Ronald Bainbridge — nuclear physicist, engineer and potato farmer
- John Christie — former moderator of the General Assembly of the Church of Scotland
- Erin Cuthbert — professional footballer for Chelsea F.C. Women and Scotland women's national football team
- Douglas Dryburgh - Olympic curler
- Meghan Gallacher — member of the Scottish Parliament for the Central Scotland region
- Majid Haq — cricketer for the Scotland national team
- Gavin Hastings — former Scottish Rugby internationalist and captain of British and Irish Lions*Mohammad Bagher Nobakht — Iranian politician
- Lord McFall, Lord Speaker, House of Lords
- Morgan McMichaels — drag queen and contestant on RuPaul’s Drag Race
- James Prime — lecturer and keyboard player for Deacon Blue
- Willie Rennie — leader of the Scottish Liberal Democrats (2011-2021) and member of the Scottish Parliament for North East Fife
- Ngozi Odu — Nigerian politician and professor
- David Scott — senior lecturer in commercial music
- David Sneddon — winner of Fame Academy
- Shirley R. Steinberg — professor in youth & community studies
- Eleanor Thom – writer
- David Torrance — constitutional specialist at the House of Commons Library

== See also ==
- Armorial of UK universities
- List of universities in the United Kingdom
- Universities in Scotland
