= List of awards and nominations received by Catherine O'Hara =

Catherine O'Hara awards and nominations
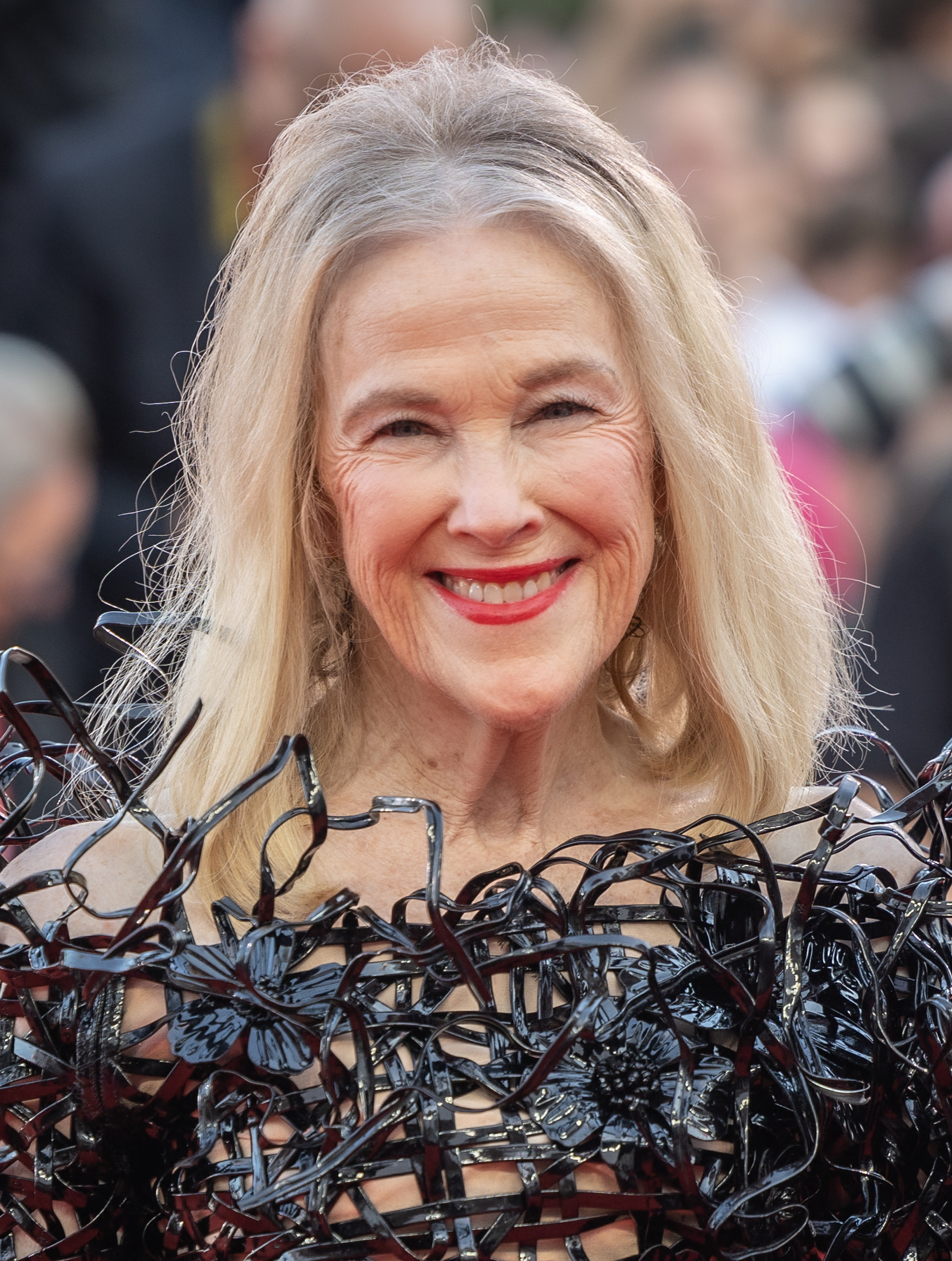
- O'Hara at the 2024 Venice Film Festival
Awards and nominations
Award	Wins	Nominations
Emmy Awards	2	10
Golden Globe Awards	1	2
SAG Awards	4	7

Totals (Note: Certain award groups do not simply award one winner. They acknowledge several different recipients, have runners-up, and have third place. Since this is a specific recognition and is different from losing an award, runner-up mentions are considered wins in this award tally. For simplification and to avoid errors, each award in this list has been presumed to have had a prior nomination.)
- Wins: 35
- Nominations: 82

Catherine O'Hara was a Canadian actress known for her comedic work in film and television. Throughout her career she received various awards including two Primetime Emmy Awards, a Golden Globe Award and four Actor Awards.

O'Hara started her career as a performer and writer on the Canadian sketch comedy show Second City Television (1976–1984), where she won the Primetime Emmy Award for Outstanding Writing for a Variety Series in 1982. She starred in a string of Christopher Guest comedy films such as Best in Show (2000), A Mighty Wind (2003), and For Your Consideration (2005) for which she was nominated for various critics groups. For her performance as Temple Grandin's Aunt in the HBO television movie Temple Grandin (2010) she was nominated for the Primetime Emmy Award for Outstanding Supporting Actress in a Limited Series or Movie and the Screen Actors Guild Award for Outstanding Actress in a Miniseries or TV Movie.

She gained a career resurgence and acclaim for her portrayal as Moira Rose in the Pop TV sitcom Schitt's Creek (2015–2020). The role earned her the Primetime Emmy Award for Outstanding Lead Actress in a Comedy Series, the Golden Globe Award for Best Actress – Television Series Musical or Comedy, and the Screen Actors Guild Award for Outstanding Performance by a Female Actor in a Comedy Series. For her work in the Apple TV+ series The Studio, O'Hara posthumously won both the Actor Award for Outstanding Performance by a Female Actor in a Comedy Series and the Actor Award for Outstanding Performance by an Ensemble in a Comedy Series.

Over her career she received several honorary awards including the US-Ireland Alliance's Oscar Wilde Award in 2018, the Governor General's Performing Arts Awards's Lifetime Artistic Achievement Award (Broadcasting and Film) in 2019, the Dorian Award for Timeless Star in 2020, and the Carnegie Corporation of New York's Great Immigrants Award in 2020. She was also selected as Forbes 50 Over 50 in 2021 and named Academy of Canadian Cinema and Television's Icon Award at the 11th Canadian Screen Awards in 2023.

== Major associations ==
=== Emmy Awards ===
Year	Category	Nominated work	Result	Ref.
Primetime Emmy Awards
1982	Outstanding Writing for a Variety Series	SCTV Network 90 (Episode: "Moral Majority Show")	Won	
1982	Outstanding Writing for a Variety Series	SCTV Network 90 (Episode: "Cycle Two, Show Two")	Nominated	
1982	Outstanding Writing for a Variety Series	SCTV Network 90 (Episode: "Staff Christmas Party")	Nominated	
1982	Outstanding Writing for a Variety Series	SCTV Network 90 (Episode: "The Great White North Palace")	Nominated	
1983	Outstanding Writing for a Variety Series	SCTV Network 90 (Episode: "The Christmas Show")	Nominated	
2010	Outstanding Supporting Actress in a Miniseries or Movie	Temple Grandin	Nominated	
2019	Outstanding Lead Actress in a Comedy Series	Schitt's Creek (episode: "The Crowening")	Nominated	
2020	Outstanding Lead Actress in a Comedy Series	Schitt's Creek (episode: "The Incident")	Won	
2025	Outstanding Supporting Actress in a Comedy Series	The Studio (for "The Promotion")	Nominated	
2025	Outstanding Guest Actress in a Drama Series	The Last of Us (for "Future Days")	Nominated	

=== Golden Globe Awards ===
Year	Category	Nominated work	Result	Ref.
2020	Best Actress – Television Series Musical or Comedy	Schitt's Creek	Won	
2026	Best Supporting Actress on Television	The Studio	Nominated	

=== Actor Awards ===
Year	Category	Nominated work	Result	Ref.
2011	Outstanding Actress in a Miniseries or TV Movie	Temple Grandin	Nominated	
2019	Outstanding Ensemble in a Comedy Series	Schitt's Creek (season five)	Nominated	
2019	Outstanding Actress in a Comedy Series	Schitt's Creek (season five)	Nominated	
2021	Outstanding Ensemble in a Comedy Series	Schitt's Creek (season six)	Won	
2021	Outstanding Actress in a Comedy Series	Schitt's Creek (season six)	Won	
2026	Outstanding Ensemble in a Comedy Series	The Studio (season one)	Won	
2026	Outstanding Actress in a Comedy Series	The Studio (season one)	Won	

== Canadian awards ==
=== ACTRA Awards ===
Year	Category	Nominated work	Result	Ref.
1978	Best Variety Performance	SCTV	Won	
2016	Outstanding Performance - Female	Schitt's Creek	Won	
2017	Members' Choice Series Ensemble	Schitt's Creek	Nominated	
2018	Members' Choice Series Ensemble	Schitt's Creek	Nominated	
2019	Members' Choice Series Ensemble	Schitt's Creek	Won	
2020	ACTRA National Award of Excellence	Lifetime achievement	Awarded	
2020	Members' Choice Series Ensemble	Schitt's Creek	Won	
2021	Members' Choice Series Ensemble	Schitt's Creek	Won	

=== Canadian Comedy Awards ===
Year	Category	Nominated work	Result	Ref.
2000	Best Performance by a Female - Film	Best in Show	Won	
2018	Multimedia/Comedic Artist of the Year	Schitt's Creek	Won	

=== Canadian Screen Awards ===
Year	Category	Nominated work	Result	Ref.
2016	Legacy Award	Lifetime Achievement	Awarded	
2016	Best Actress in a Continuing Leading Comedic Role	Schitt's Creek	Won	
2017	Best Actress in a Continuing Leading Comedic Role	Schitt's Creek	Won	
2018	Best Actress in a Continuing Leading Comedic Role	Schitt's Creek	Won	
2019	Best Actress in a Continuing Leading Comedic Role	Schitt's Creek	Won	
2020	Best Actress in a Continuing Leading Comedic Role	Schitt's Creek	Won	
2021	Best Actress in a Continuing Leading Comedic Role	Schitt's Creek	Won	
2023	Academy Icon Award	Lifetime Achievement	Awarded	

=== Gemini Awards ===
Year	Category	Nominated work	Result	Ref.
1995	Earle Grey Award (with the cast of SCTV)	SCTV	Awarded	
1998	Best Guest Actress in a Dramatic Series	The Outer Limits	Nominated	

=== Genie Awards ===
Year	Category	Nominated work	Result	Ref.
2000	Best Actress in a Supporting Role	The Life Before This	Won	

== Miscellaneous awards ==
Year	Award	Category	Work	Result	Ref.
2021	AACTA Awards	Best Actress in a Series	Schitt's Creek	Nominated	
2003	AARP Movies for Grownups Awards	Best Grownup Love Story	A Mighty Wind	Nominated	
2003	AARP Movies for Grownups Awards	Best Actress	A Mighty Wind	Nominated	
2006	AARP Movies for Grownups Awards	Best Actress	For Your Consideration	Nominated	
2021	AARP Movies for Grownups Awards	Best Actress (Television)	Schitt's Creek	Won	
2026	AARP Movies for Grownups Awards	Best Actress (Television)	The Studio	Nominated	
2006	Alliance of Women Film Journalists	Best Actress in a Comedic Performance	For Your Consideration	Nominated	
2001	American Comedy Awards	Funniest Supporting Actress in a Motion Picture	Best in Show	Won	
2012	Annie Awards	Voice Acting in a Feature Production	Frankenweenie	Nominated	
2025	Astra Awards	Best Supporting Actress in a Comedy Series	The Studio	Won	
2025	Astra Awards	Best Guest Actress in a Drama Series	The Last of Us (HBO)	Nominated	
1994	CableACE Awards	Actress in a Dramatic Series	The Hidden Room (Episode: The First Battle)	Nominated	
2006	Chlotrudis Awards	Best Supporting Actress	For Your Consideration	Nominated	
2020	Dorian Awards	TV Performance of the Year - Actress	Schitt's Creek	Nominated	
2020	Dorian Awards	Timeless Star		Awarded	
2020	Dorian Awards	Best TV Performance - Actress	Schitt's Creek	Won	
2025	Dorian Awards	Best Supporting TV Performance—Comedy	The Studio	Nominated	
2006	Gotham Independent Film Awards	Best Ensemble Cast	For Your Consideration	Nominated	
2021	Gracie Awards	Outstanding Actress in a Comedy	Schitt's Creek	Won	
2006	Independent Spirit Awards	Best Female Lead	For Your Consideration	Nominated	
2019	Online Film & Television Association	Best Actress in a Comedy Series	Schitt's Creek	Nominated	
2019	Online Film & Television Association	Best Ensemble in a Comedy Series	Schitt's Creek	Nominated	
2020	Online Film & Television Association	Best Actress in a Comedy Series	Schitt's Creek	Won	
2020	Online Film & Television Association	Best Ensemble in a Comedy Series	Schitt's Creek	Won	
2025	Online Film & Television Association	Best Supporting Actress in a Comedy Series	The Studio	Won	
2025	Online Film & Television Association	Best Guest Actress in a Drama Series	The Last Of Us	Nominated	
2001	Satellite Awards	Best Actress in a Supporting Role, Comedy or Musical	Best in Show	Nominated	
2004	Satellite Awards	Best Actress in a Supporting Role, Comedy or Musical	A Mighty Wind	Nominated	
2010	Satellite Awards	Best Actress in a Supporting Role - Television	Temple Grandin	Nominated	
2019	Satellite Awards	Best Actress in a Series, Comedy or Musical	Schitt's Creek	Nominated	
2021	Satellite Awards	Best Actress in a Musical or Comedy Series	Schitt's Creek	Nominated	
2026	Satellite Awards	Best Supporting Actress in a Series Miniseries or Television Film	The Studio	Nominated	
2019	TCA Awards	Individual Achievement in Comedy	Schitt's Creek	Nominated	
2020	TCA Awards	Individual Achievement In Comedy	Schitt's Creek	Won	
2011	Western Heritage Awards	Television Feature Film	Temple Grandin	Won	

== Critics awards ==
Year	Award	Category	Work	Result	Ref.
2006	Broadcast Film Critics Association Awards	Best Supporting Actress	For Your Consideration	Nominated	
2019	Critics' Choice Television Awards	Best Actress in a Comedy Series	Schitt's Creek	Nominated	
2020	Critics' Choice Television Awards	Best Actress in a Comedy Series	Schitt's Creek	Won	
2003	Florida Film Critics Circle Awards	Best Ensemble Cast	A Mighty Wind	Won	
2006	Kansas City Film Critics Circle Awards	Best Supporting Actress	For Your Consideration	Won	
2003	Los Angeles Film Critics Association	Best Music Score	For Your Consideration	Nominated	
2006	National Board of Review	Best Supporting Actress	For Your Consideration	Won	
2006	New York Film Critics Circle Awards	Best Supporting Actress	For Your Consideration	Nominated	
2006	New York Film Critics, Online	Best Supporting Actress	For Your Consideration	Tied	
2003	Phoenix Film Critics Society Awards	Best Ensemble Acting	A Mighty Wind	Nominated	
2003	Seattle Film Critics Awards	Best Music	A Mighty Wind	Won	
2015	Toronto International Film Festival	Birks Diamond Tribute Award	Lifetime Achievement	Awarded	
2025	Toronto International Film Festival	Norman Jewison Career Achievement Award	Lifetime Achievement	Awarded	

== Honorary awards ==
- O'Hara was selected for the inaugural 2021 Forbes 50 Over 50; made up of entrepreneurs, leaders, scientists and creators who are over the age of 50.
- O'Hara is also referenced in the Bran Van 3000 song "Supermodel" from their 1996 album Glee.
- In January 2023, she was named the winner of the Academy of Canadian Cinema and Television's Icon Award at the 11th Canadian Screen Awards.

Year	Association	Award	Result	Ref.
2018	US-Ireland Alliance	Oscar Wilde Award	Awarded	
2019	Legionnaires of Laughter Legacy Awards	Best Comedy Artist Female	Nominated	
2019	Governor General's Performing Arts Awards	Lifetime Artistic Achievement Award (Broadcasting and Film)	Awarded	
2020	Carnegie Corporation of New York	Great Immigrants	Awarded	
2021	Top 25 Women of Influence	Recipient	Awarded	
