= Catherine O'Hara =

Canadian and American actress (1954–2026)

Catherine O'Hara OC
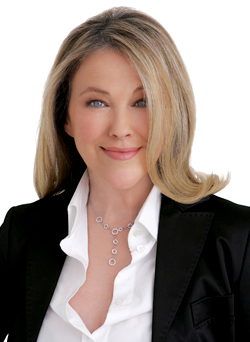
- O'Hara in 2005
- Born: Catherine Anne O'Hara; March 4, 1954; Toronto, Ontario, Canada
- Died: January 30, 2026 (aged 71); Santa Monica, California, U.S.
- Citizenship: Canada; U.S.
- Occupations: Actress; comedian
- Years active: 1974–2026
- Spouse: Bo Welch (m. 1992)
- Children: 2
- Relatives: Mary Margaret O'Hara (sister)
- Awards: Full list

Catherine Anne O'Hara (March 4, 1954 – January 30, 2026) was a Canadian and American actress and comedian, whose career spanned 50 years. O'Hara started in sketch and improvisational comedy in film and television before taking dramatic roles to expand her career. She received various accolades including two Primetime Emmy Awards, a Golden Globe Award, and four Screen Actors Guild Awards. Her films have grossed more than US$4.3 billion worldwide. She was appointed an Officer of the Order of Canada in 2017.

O'Hara began her career in a starring role on the CBC Television children's television sitcom Coming Up Rosie in 1975, and came to prominence in the sketch comedy series Second City Television (SCTV; 1976–1984), for which she won a Primetime Emmy Award. She gained acclaim acting in films such as After Hours (1985), Heartburn (1986), Beetlejuice (1988), Home Alone (1990), and Home Alone 2: Lost in New York (1992). She acted in the Christopher Guest mockumentary films Waiting for Guffman (1996), Best in Show (2000), A Mighty Wind (2003), and For Your Consideration (2006). She voiced roles in The Nightmare Before Christmas (1993), Chicken Little (2005), Over the Hedge, Monster House (both 2006), Where the Wild Things Are (2009), Frankenweenie (2012), Elemental (2023), and The Wild Robot (2024).

Appearing opposite Eugene Levy, a frequent castmate in SCTV and Guest's films, O'Hara experienced a career resurgence for her role as Moira Rose in the CBC sitcom Schitt's Creek (2015–2020), earning a Primetime Emmy Award and a Golden Globe Award. She was also Emmy-nominated for her roles in the HBO television film Temple Grandin (2010), the HBO drama series The Last of Us (2025), and the Apple TV+ comedy series The Studio (2025). She also acted in the HBO drama series Six Feet Under (2003–2005) and the Netflix series A Series of Unfortunate Events (2017–2019).

== Early life ==
Catherine Anne O'Hara was born on March 4, 1954, into a Catholic family of Irish descent in Toronto, Ontario, and grew up there. She was the sixth of seven children born to Margaret Ann (née Meehan) and Marcus Charles O'Hara. Her elder sister Mary Margaret is a musician and actress. In 1974, O'Hara graduated from Burnhamthorpe Collegiate Institute, where she was taught by future Mississauga mayor Carolyn Parrish.

== Career ==
=== 1974–1987: Breakthrough with SCTV ===
O'Hara started her comedy career in 1974 as a cast member of The Second City (SC) in her hometown, Toronto. Her brother Marcus was also a performer with the company. She originally worked as an understudy and in the Sunday night cast of alternates which performed when the main company had the night off. She was an understudy for Gilda Radner until Radner left for Saturday Night Live. She then joined the touring company of Second City, and had her big break replacing an ailing Rosemary Radcliffe in the lead female part when this touring group was in Chicago. By 1976 O'Hara was SC's resident leading female comic.

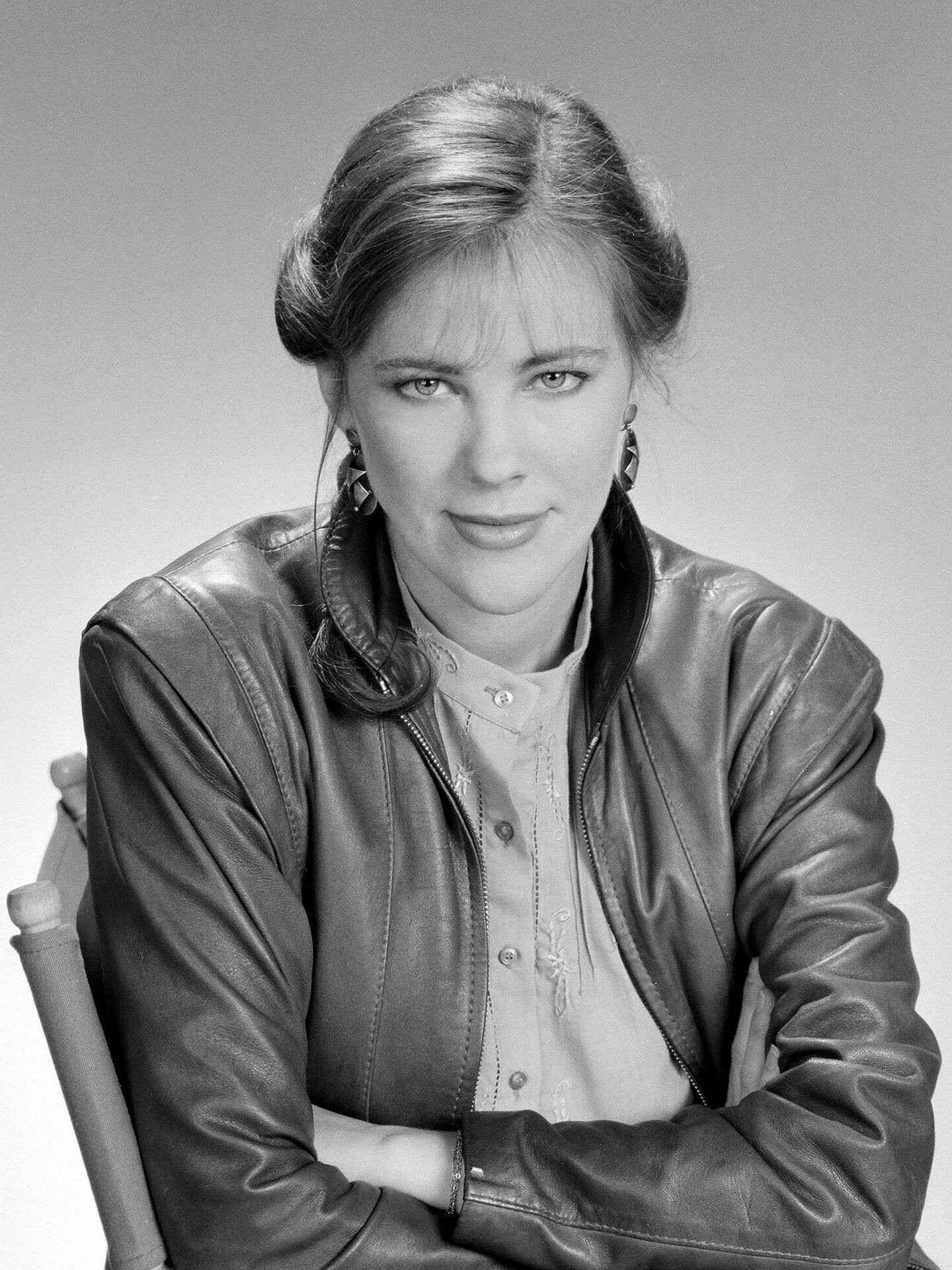
O'Hara in a promotional image for SCTV Network 90 in 1981

In 1976 SC created the sketch comedy show Second City Television (SCTV), for which O'Hara became a regular performer. In the late 1970s, she provided voice-overs for a number of cartoons, work which would continue throughout her career. During a short period in the early 1980s when SCTV was in between network deals, she was hired to replace Ann Risley as Saturday Night Live was being retooled in 1981. However, she quit the show without appearing on air, choosing to go back to SCTV when the show signed on with NBC. She was long rumoured to have left SNL due to conflicts with volatile writer Michael O'Donoghue, but O'Hara denied these claims and said she had left the show due to her dislike for living in New York City.

O'Hara expanded her career on television in the mid-1970s. She appeared in a small sketch role as a maid in a 1975 Wayne and Shuster special on CBC. She appeared in the 1976 television film The Rimshots, the children's television series Coming Up Rosie for a season (1976–77), and television specials, such as Witch's Night Out and Intergalactic Thanksgiving. Her performances on SCTV, which began airing locally in Southern Ontario in the fall of 1976, earned her fame in Canada. The show gradually built up a national and then an international following in syndication. O'Hara left SCTV for a time, missing the 1980–81 season, but returned to the show in time for its pickup by the NBC television network in the US, when it became known as SCTV Network 90. O'Hara's work as a writer on the show earned her an Emmy Award for outstanding writing and three Emmy Award nominations. She left SCTV again prior to its fifth season in 1982, but did return for occasional guest appearances through the show's end in 1984. O'Hara appeared in a number of television series and television films and continued to work in television for the rest of her life.

=== 1988–2014: Prominence in film ===
During the 1990s, she made guest appearances on Tales from the Crypt, Oh Baby, Morton & Hayes, and The Larry Sanders Show. She acted in and directed episodes of Dream On and The Outer Limits, the revival of the 1960s series of the same name. O'Hara guest-starred on top-rated television series including Six Feet Under and Curb Your Enthusiasm. In May 2008, it was announced that she had signed on to star in the upcoming ABC dramedy Good Behavior. Her role in the 2010 television film Temple Grandin earned her three award nominations: a Primetime Emmy Award, a Satellite Award, and a Screen Actors Guild Award.

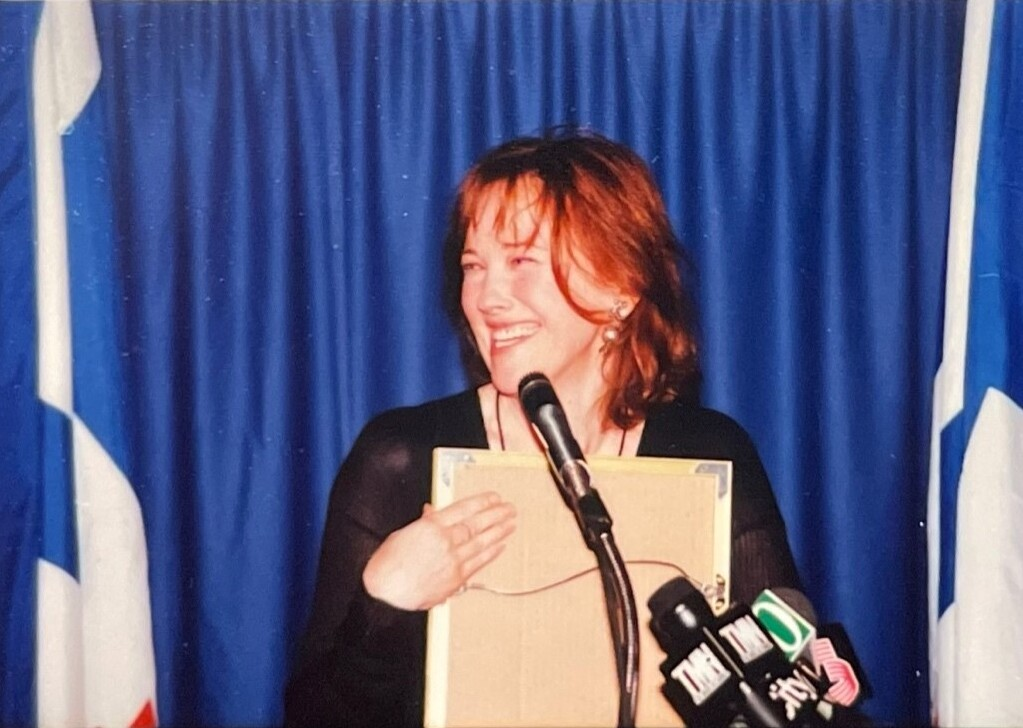
O'Hara at SCTV Day in Toronto in 1995

O'Hara had a successful career in film. She made her feature debut in the 1980 film Double Negative, which also starred her SCTV co-stars John Candy, Eugene Levy, and Joe Flaherty. Throughout the 1980s and 1990s, O'Hara appeared in many supporting roles, including Martin Scorsese's After Hours (1985) and Heartburn (1986). She appeared as Delia Deetz in the horror-comedy film Beetlejuice (1988). In 1990, O'Hara had roles in the films Dick Tracy and Betsy's Wedding. She starred as Kate McCallister in the blockbuster comedy film Home Alone (1990) and its sequel Home Alone 2: Lost in New York (1992). That same year, O'Hara appeared in the comedy There Goes the Neighborhood.

O'Hara continued to appear in many films during the 1990s and the beginning of the 21st century. In 1994, she appeared in the comedy-drama film The Paper and the Western film Wyatt Earp. She received roles in four of Christopher Guest's mockumentary films, three of which earned her awards and nominations: Waiting for Guffman (1996), Best in Show (2000), A Mighty Wind (2003), and For Your Consideration (2006). Her role in 1999's The Life Before This won her a Genie Award for Best Performance by an Actress in a Supporting Role. She appeared in the tenth series of the British version of Whose Line Is It Anyway? In 2004, she appeared with Jim Carrey in the black comedy film Lemony Snicket's A Series of Unfortunate Events, and in 2006, she starred with Christina Ricci in the fantasy film Penelope. O'Hara served as a voice artist in a number of animated films, including Sally and Shock in The Nightmare Before Christmas (1993), Bartok the Magnificent (1999), Chicken Little (2005), Over the Hedge (2006), Monster House (2006), Brother Bear 2 (2006), Where the Wild Things Are (2009), and Frankenweenie (2012).

=== 2015–2025: Schitt's Creek and other roles ===
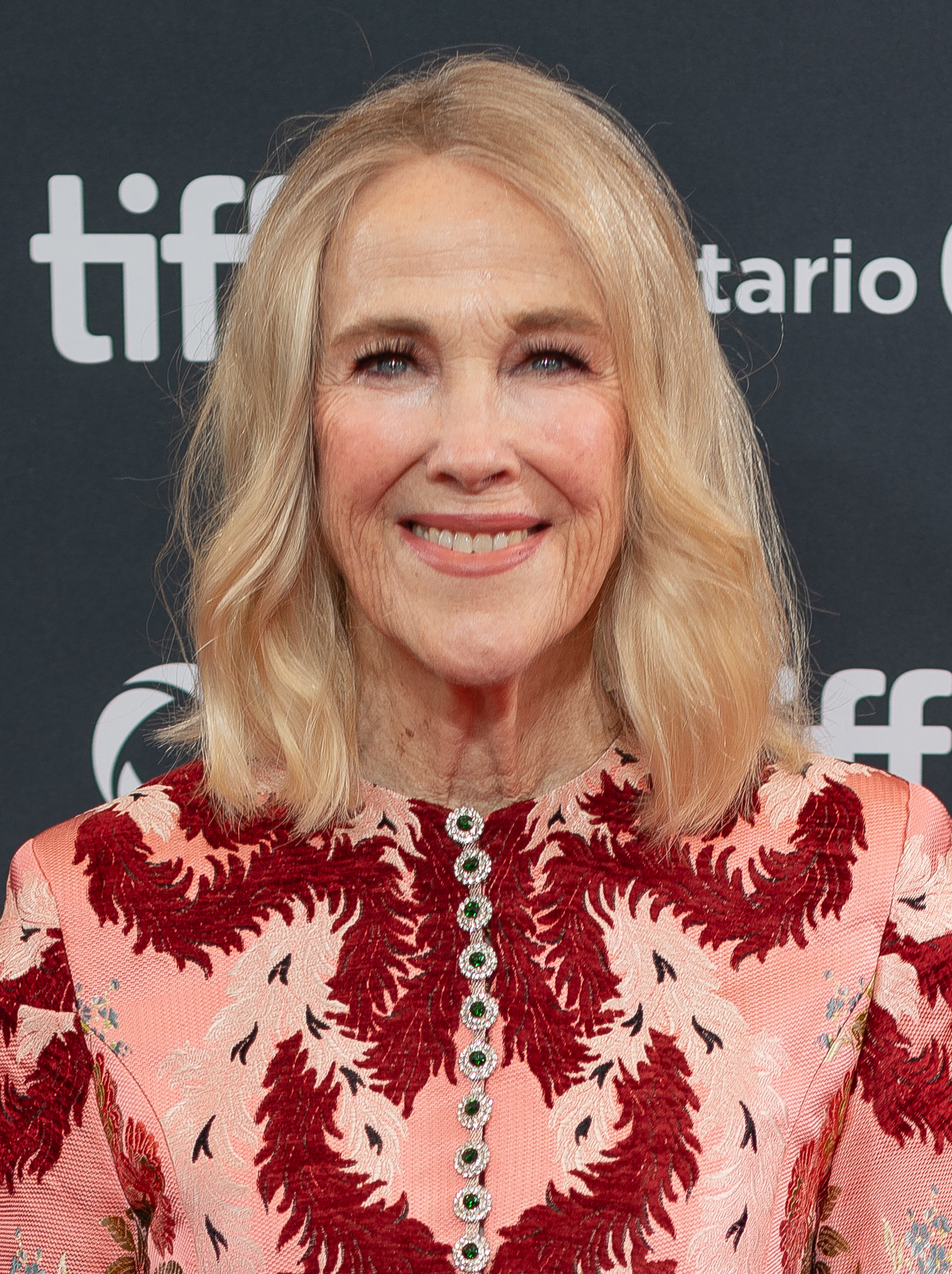
O'Hara at the 2024 Toronto International Film Festival

From 2015 to 2020, O'Hara co-starred as Moira Rose in the CBC sitcom Schitt's Creek, alongside Eugene Levy, with whom she had previously worked on TV, in films, and as a Second City cast member on stage in 1974. Her performance in Schitt's Creek earned her six Canadian Screen Awards for Best Lead Actress in a Comedy Series. She swept the five major TV awards for the sixth and final season, winning a TCA Award for Individual Achievement in Comedy, a Primetime Emmy Award for Outstanding Lead Actress in a Comedy Series, a Golden Globe Award for Best Actress – Television Series Musical or Comedy, a Critics' Choice Television Award for Best Actress in a Comedy Series, and a Screen Actors Guild Award for Outstanding Performance by a Female Actor in a Comedy Series. During this time she also starred in The Addams Family (2019), Extinct (2021), Elemental (2023), and The Wild Robot (2024).

She appeared as Dr. Georgina Orwell in the first season of the Netflix black comedy drama series A Series of Unfortunate Events, which premiered in 2017. Two of her episodes were directed by her husband Bo Welch, who served as production designer for the series. She was the only cast member from the 2004 film adaptation to be re-cast in the TV series as well. She appeared on the revival of another Canadian sketch comedy staple, The Kids in the Hall, in its second episode as Charlene, a friend of the Kids in the Hall. O'Hara reprised her role as Delia Deetz in the Beetlejuice sequel, Beetlejuice Beetlejuice, in 2024.

In 2025, O'Hara had a main role in the Apple TV+ satirical comedy series The Studio, for which she won both the Actor Award for Outstanding Performance by a Female Actor in a Comedy Series and the Actor Award for Outstanding Performance by an Ensemble in a Comedy Series, at the Actor Awards' March 2026 ceremony; show co-creator Seth Rogen accepted the awards on O'Hara's behalf. She was the first woman to win any individual Actor Awards (or, as previously called, Screen Actors Guild Awards) trophy posthumously. She guest-starred as Gail Lynden in the second season of the HBO post-apocalyptic drama series The Last of Us. She received Primetime Emmy Award nominations for both roles. O'Hara's film appearances contributed to a cumulative worldwide box‑office gross of more than US$4.3 billion.

== Personal life ==
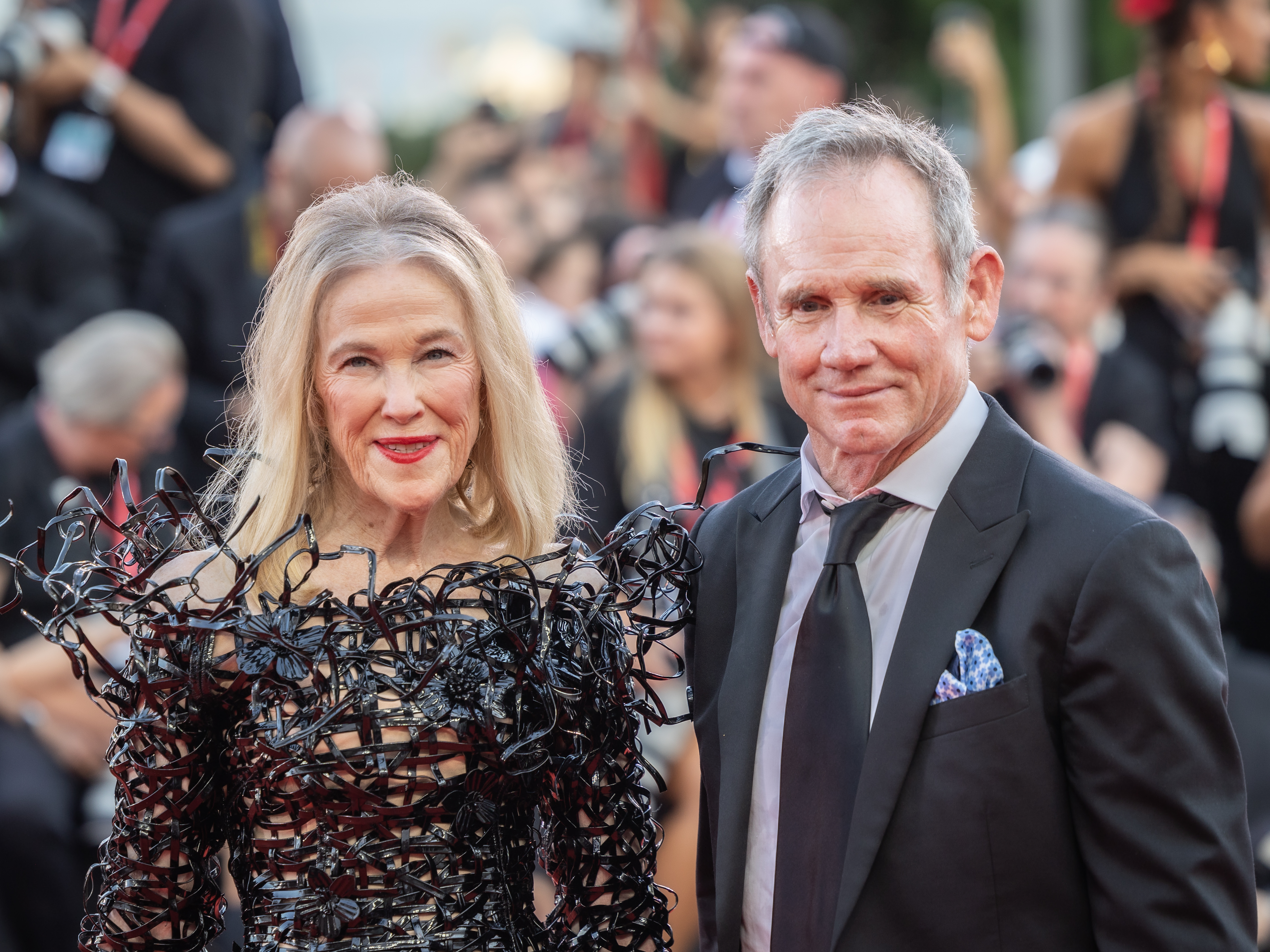
O'Hara with Welch at the 2024 Venice Film Festival in Venice, Italy

=== Marriage and family ===
In 1983, O'Hara told Rolling Stone magazine that she was "pretty much a good Catholic girl at heart". In 1988, O'Hara met production designer and director Bo Welch on the set of Beetlejuice. The couple married in 1992. Their sons were born in 1994 and 1997.

O'Hara held dual Canadian and American citizenship.

=== Health ===
O'Hara had dextrocardia with situs inversus, a rare condition in which the heart and other major internal organs are mirrored from their normal positions. She contracted COVID-19 while filming The Studio in the mid-2020s. She admitted in early 2025 having not gotten tested for the virus so the crew could finish shooting on location, and she also did not inform her coworkers of her condition.

=== Death and tributes ===
On January 30, 2026, a spokesperson for the Los Angeles Fire Department said that the department had received a call from O'Hara's home in Brentwood, Los Angeles regarding a woman experiencing difficulty breathing. She was then hospitalized "in serious condition", and died that day at Saint John's Health Center in Santa Monica, California, at the age of 71. The cause of death was later revealed to be from a pulmonary embolism, with rectal cancer as the underlying cause. Her funeral was held on February 14, 2026, and numerous tributes from the entertainment industry were made to O'Hara. Tributes were made to her by Rachel McAdams at the 98th Academy Awards and Macaulay Culkin, Annie Murphy and Dan Levy at the 78th Primetime Emmy Awards.

== Acting credits ==
=== Film ===
Year	Title	Role	Notes	Ref.
1980	Nothing Personal	Audrey		
1980	Deadly Companion	Judith		
1983	Rock & Rule	Aunt Edith (voice)		
1985	After Hours	Gail		
1986	Heartburn	Betty		
1988	Beetlejuice	Delia Deetz		
1990	Dick Tracy	Texie Garcia		
1990	Betsy's Wedding	Gloria Henner		
1990	Home Alone	Kate McCallister		
1990	Little Vegas	Lexie		
1992	There Goes the Neighborhood	Jessica Lodge		
1992	Home Alone 2: Lost in New York	Kate McCallister		
1993	The Nightmare Before Christmas	Sally / Shock (voice)		
1994	The Paper	Susan		
1994	Wyatt Earp	Allie Earp		
1994	A Simple Twist of Fate	April Simon		
1995	Tall Tale	Calamity Jane		
1996	Waiting for Guffman	Sheila Albertson		
1996	The Last of the High Kings	Cathleen		
1997	Pippi Longstocking	Mrs. Prysselius (voice)		
1998	Home Fries	Beatrice Lever		
1999	The Life Before This	Sheena		
1999	Bartok the Magnificent	Ludmilla (voice)		
2000	Best in Show	Cookie Fleck		
2000	Edwurd Fudwupper Fibbed Big	Lorna Mae Loon (voice)	Short film	
2001	Speaking of Sex	Connie Barker		
2002	Orange County	Cindy Beugler		
2002	Searching for Debra Winger	Herself	Documentary	
2003	A Mighty Wind	Mickey Crabbe		
2004	Surviving Christmas	Christine Valco		
2004	Lemony Snicket's A Series of Unfortunate Events	Justice Strauss		
2005	Game 6	Lillian Rogan		
2005	Chicken Little	Tina (voice)		
2006	Over the Hedge	Penny (voice)		
2006	Monster House	Mrs. Walters (voice)		
2006	Brother Bear 2	Kata (voice)		
2006	Penelope	Jessica Wilhern		
2006	For Your Consideration	Marilyn Heck		
2006	Barbie in the 12 Dancing Princesses	Rowena (voice)		
2009	Away We Go	Gloria Farlander		
2009	Where the Wild Things Are	Judith (voice)		
2010	Killers	Mrs. Kornfeldt		
2011	A Monster in Paris	Madame Carlotta (voice)		
2012	Frankenweenie	Susan Frankenstein / Gym Teacher / Weird Girl (voices)		
2013	A.C.O.D.	Melissa		
2013	The Right Kind of Wrong	Tess		
2014	When Marnie Was There	Old Marnie (voice)	English-language dub	
2015	Being Canadian	Herself	Documentary	
2019	The Addams Family	Grandma Frump (voice)		
2020	Canada Far and Wide	Narrator (voice)	Movie attraction for World Showcase (Note: Epcot at Walt Disney World)	
2021	Extinct	Alma (voice)		
2021	Back Home Again	Mayor Owl (voice)	Short film	
2023	Elemental	Brook Ripple (voice)		
2023	Pain Hustlers	Jackie Drake		
2024	Argylle	Ruth		
2024	Beetlejuice Beetlejuice	Delia Deetz		
2024	The Wild Robot	Pinktail (voice)	Final fictional film role	
2025	John Candy: I Like Me	Herself	Documentary	
2026	Marty, Life Is Short	Herself	Documentary; posthumous release	
2026	SCTV: The Greatest Show You've Never Heard Of	Herself	Documentary; posthumous release	

=== Television ===
Year	Title	Role	Notes	Ref.
1975	Wayne and Shuster	Various	Episode: "1975 Show #2"	
1975–1977	Coming Up Rosie	Marna Wallbacker	Main role	
1976	The Rimshots	Maggie	Retooled as Custard Pie with a different cast	
1976–1984	Second City Television	Various	Main cast (Seasons 1, 2 & 4), guest (Seasons 5 & 6); Also writer; seasons 1, 2, 4 & 6, and The Best of SCTV	
1977	Fit To Print		Television film	
1978	Witch's Night Out	Malicious (voice)	Television special	
1979	Intergalactic Thanksgiving	Ma Spademinder (voice)	Television short	
1980	Easter Fever	Scarlett O'Hare (voice)	Television special	
1980	From Cleveland	Various	Television pilot; Also writer	
1980	You've Come a Long Way, Katie	Chris Dougherty	Miniseries	
1984	The New Show	Various	3 episodes	
1985	The Last Polka	Lemon Twin	Television film	
1985	George Burns Comedy Week	Sally	Episode: "The Dynamite Girl"	
1986	Dave Thomas: The Incredible Time Travels of Henry Osgood	Marie Antoinette	Television film	
1986	Really Weird Tales	Theresa Sharpe	Episode: "I'll Die Loving"; Also writer	
1987	Trying Times	Rebecca	Episode: "Get a Job"	
1988	The Completely Mental Misadventures of Ed Grimley	Miss Malone (voice)	Main role	
1988	Saturday Night Live	Herself	Episode: "Matthew Broderick / The Sugarcubes"	
1989	I, Martin Short, Goes Hollywood	Nancy Mae	Television special	
1989	Andrea Martin... Together Again	Various	Television special; Also writer; special material	
1990	The Dave Thomas Comedy Show	Various	Episode: "#1.5"	
1990	Dream On	Irma	Episode: "555-HELL"; Also director; episode: "And Your Little Dog, Too"	
1991	Morton & Hayes	Amelia von Astor	Episode: "Daffy Dicks"	
1991	Married... with Children	Female Dog	Episode: "Look Who's Barking"	
1991; 1992	Saturday Night Live	Herself / Host	Episodes: "Catherine O'Hara / R.E.M." "Catherine O'Hara / 10,000 Maniacs"	
1992	The Larry Sanders Show	Herself	Episode: "The Talk Show Episode"	
1993	The Hidden Room	Laurel Brody	Episode: "The First Battle"	
1994	Tales from the Crypt	Geraldine Ferrett	Episode: "Let the Punishment Fit the Crime"	
1997	The Outer Limits	Becka Paulson	Episode: "The Revelations of Becka Paulson"; Also director; episode: "Glyphic"	
1997	Hope	Muriel Macswain	Television film	
1998	Whose Line Is It Anyway?	Herself	3 episodes	
1999	Late Last Night	Shrink	Television film	
1999	Oh Baby	Roberta Hunter	Episode: "Discrimination"	
2000	Mad TV	Woman on Blind Date	Episode: "24"	
2001	Committed	Liz Larsen (voice)	Main role	
2002	Bram & Alice	Ms. O'Connor	Episode: "Pilot"	
2002	Dr. Katz, Professional Therapist	Catherine (voice)	Episode: "Bakery Ben"	
2003	Odd Job Jack	Claudia Johnson	Episode: "Broke & Broker"	
2003–2005	Six Feet Under	Carol Ward	4 episodes	
2004	The Wool Cap	Gloria	Television film	
2008	Good Behavior	Jackie West	Television film	
2009	Curb Your Enthusiasm	Bam Bam	Episode: "Funkhouser's Crazy Sister"	
2009–2011	Glenn Martin, DDS	Jackie Martin (voice)	Main role	
2010	Temple Grandin	Aunt Ann	Television film	
2012	Leslie	Leslie	2 episodes	
2012	30 Rock	Pearline	Episode: "Governor Dunston"	
2013	The Greatest Event in Television History	Muriel Rush	Episode: "Too Close for Comfort"	
2013	To My Future Assistant	Magda	Television film	
2015	What Lives Inside	Sarah Delaney	Miniseries	
2015–2020	Schitt's Creek	Moira Rose	Main role; Also consulting producer; seasons 2–6	
2015	Modern Family	Dr. Debra Radcliffe	Episode: "Clean Out Your Junk Drawer"	
2016	Sofia the First	Morgana (voice)	Episode: "Gone with the Wand"	
2016	Harvey Beaks	Miley Page (voice)	2 episodes; "The Case of the Missing Pancake" and "Mr. & Mrs. Borks"	
2016–2018	Skylanders Academy	Kaossandra (voice)	Main role	
2017–2018	A Series of Unfortunate Events	Dr. Georgina Orwell	3 episodes	
2018	The Magic School Bus Rides Again	Aunt Tennelli / Teresina Tennelli (voices)	2 episodes	
2019–2020	The Last Kids on Earth	Skaelka (voice)	6 episodes	
2020	Who Wants to Be a Millionaire?	Herself	2 episodes	
2022	Central Park	Gwendolyn Swish (voice)	Episode: "The Paige-riarchy!"	
2022	The Kids in the Hall	Charlene	Episode 6.2	
2025	The Studio	Patty Leigh	Main role	
2025	The Last of Us	Gail Lynden	3 episodes; season 2	

=== Music videos ===
Year	Title	Artist(s)	Role	Ref.
2024	"Electric Energy"	Ariana DeBose, Boy George, Nile Rodgers	Herself	

=== Video games ===
Year	Title	Role	Ref.
2024	Disney Speedstorm	Sally (voice)	
2024	Disney Dreamlight Valley	Sally (voice)	

== Awards and honors ==
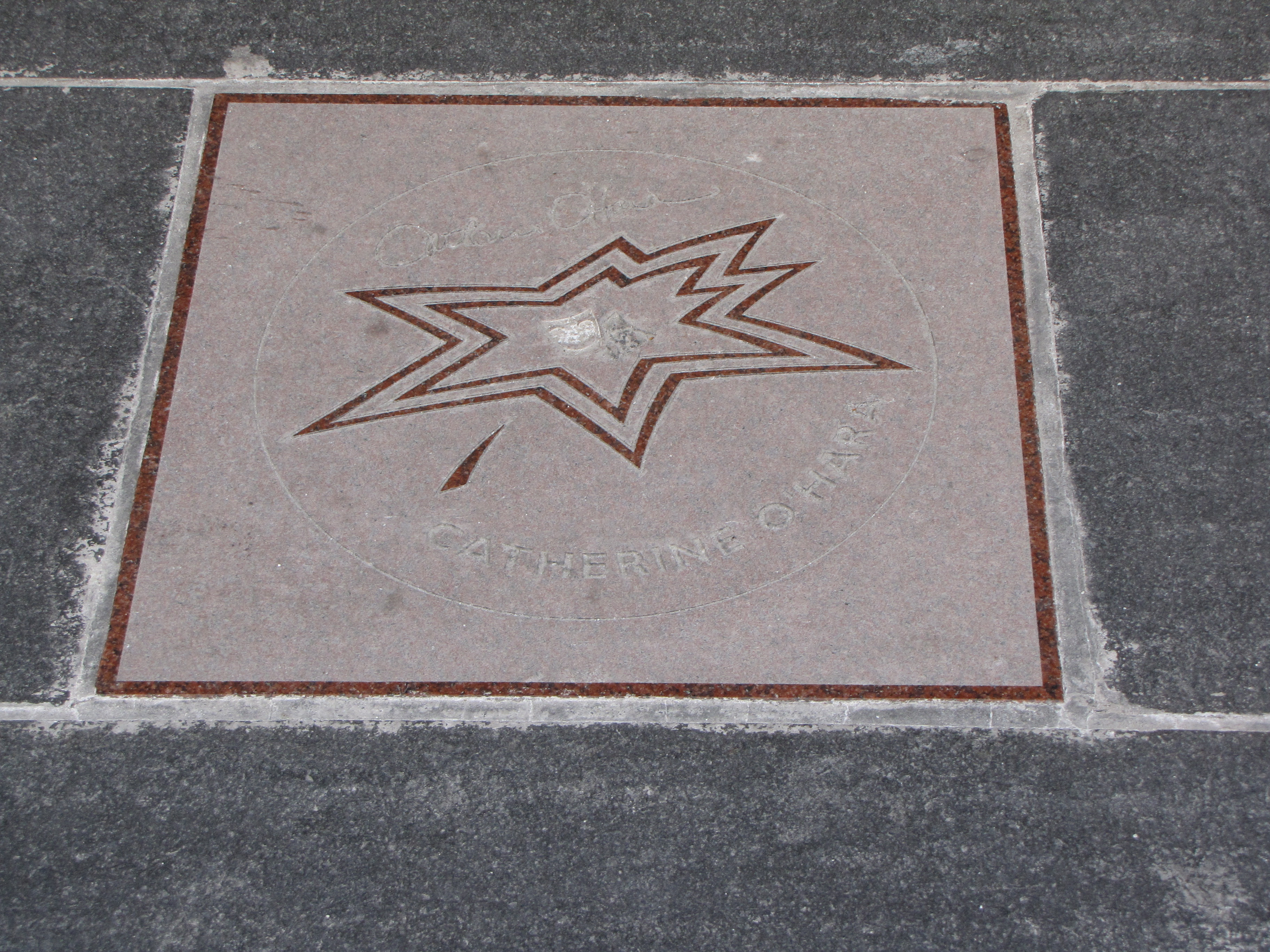
O'Hara's star on Canada's Walk of Fame

O'Hara was made an Officer of the Order of Canada in 2017 and was invested the following year. For 2021, O'Hara was named honorary mayor of Brentwood, Los Angeles.

On March 1, 2026, O'Hara won a posthumous award for Outstanding Female Actor in a Comedy Series at the 32nd Actor Awards for her performance on The Studio. Seth Rogen, co-creator of The Studio, accepted the award on her behalf. In his remarks, he described her as a dedicated collaborator who frequently sent thoughtful emails the night before filming, offering suggested revisions to scenes. Rogen stated that O’Hara “showed that you could be a genius and you could be kind.”
