= Yekemi Otaru =

Nigerian author and entrepreneur

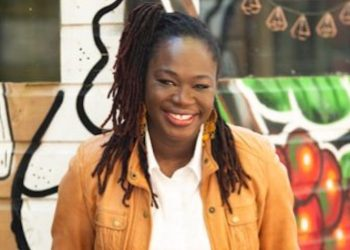

Chancellor of University of the West of Scotland
- Incumbent
- Assumed office 1 September 2021
- Preceded by: Lady Elish Angiolini KC

Personal details
- Education: University of Benin (Nigeria); Henley Business School; American British Academy

Yekemi Otaru (née Awoseyin) is an entrepreneur, author and university Chancellor. In 2016, she published her book ‘The Smart Sceptic's Guide to Social Media in Organisations’. Yekemi owned YO! Marketing Limited from 2016 to 2018, then became Co-Founder and Chief Growth Officer at Doqaru Limited. Yekemi holds degrees in engineering and an MBA from Henley Business School. She served on the board at Interface, a Scottish public sector backed establishment linking businesses with academia to drive innovation. In 2021, she became the Chancellor of University of the West of Scotland.

== Early life and education ==
Yekemi was born to her mother, Sarah Olubunmi Awoseyin, from Iya-Gbede in the Ijumu Local Government Area of Kogi State, Nigeria, and her father, Dr. Raphael Sunday Awoseyin from Ayedun town of Oke Ero Local Government, Kwara State, Nigeria. Yekemi lived in Muscat, Oman from 1990 to 1995 before returning to Warri, Nigeria.

Yekemi began studying Chemical Engineering in 1997 at the University of Benin (Nigeria) where she obtained a Bachelor’s degree. In 2003, Yekemi began studying at IFP School to graduate with an MSc in Petroleum Engineering & Project Development.

In 2004, Yekemi moved to the United Kingdom with her husband, Gabriel Otaru. She soon began her career at Total E&P (now TotalEnergies) before moving to Schlumberger (now SLB) where she worked until 2013. In the same year, she completed her MBA from Henley Business School. Yekemi and Gabriel have two teenage children together.

== Career ==
Yekemi began her career as a Production Engineering Technical Sales Lead at Schlumberger. During her seven years there, Yekemi possessed roles as a Production Engineer, New Business Technical Sales Lead and Senior Web Analyst.

In 2013, Yekemi pivoted her career focus towards marketing, where she became Senior Marketing Manager at Baker Hughes, before progressing to Senior Strategic Marketing Manager. In 2015, Yekemi took a career break to pursue her personal goal of writing her best-selling book titled ‘The Smart Sceptic’s Guide to Social Media in Organisations’. The book reached the top 100 in five categories on Amazon UK and sits in the top 500 in the Social Networks category on Kindle.

After completing a career break in late 2015, Yekemi began her role as Strategic Marketing Advisor at Lloyd’s Register. In February 2016, Yekemi founded her marketing consultancy, YO! Marketing. During this time, Yekemi helped found Elevator UK’s Accelerator. Two years later, Yekemi co-founded Scotland’s first multi-award-winning sales enablement consultancy, Doqaru, with her business partner, Sarah Downs. In 2021, Yekemi became Chancellor of the University of the West of Scotland.

== University of the West of Scotland ==
On 1 September 2021, Yekemi was appointed Chancellor of the University of the West of Scotland (UWS). Due to COVID-19 restrictions, her formal installation ceremony took place on 29 June 2022. Yekemi was also awarded an honorary doctorate by UWS in recognition of her contribution to higher education and entrepreneurship at the installation ceremony.

As Chancellor, Yekemi has powers to confer degrees and became an ambassador for UWS at home and abroad. Her role includes officiating graduation ceremonies, typically in July (Summer graduations) and November (Winter graduations) each year. As of December 2023, Yekemi has officiated over thirty (30) graduation ceremonies across the five UK UWS campuses in Paisley, Dumfries, Lanarkshire, Ayr and London.

== Publications ==
- The Smart Sceptic's Guide to Social Media in Organisations
- Sales Performance: Social Selling Proves to be a Critical Success Factor in Sales
- The State of Sales Skills in UK SMEs

== Awards ==
- In November 2023, Otaru and her business partner Sarah Downs were awarded Service Industries Entrepreneur of the Year at the Great British Entrepreneur Awards.
- Otaru's business, Doqaru, was awarded Business of Excellence of the Year at the Black Scottish Awards in 2023.
- In November 2022, Doqaru won the Small Business of the Year Award at the Great British Entrepreneur Awards.
- Otaru and her business partner, Sarah Downs, won Social Entrepreneur of the Year award at the 4th Scottish Women’s Awards in October 2022.
- Otaru was named one of 40 under 40 by Scottish Business News in 2016.
