= Naomi Booth =

English fiction writer and academic (born 1980)

- Born: Naomi Rebecca Booth; 16 November 1980 (age 45); Bradford, England
- Education: University of Cambridge; University of Sussex
- Years active: 2015–present
- Website: naomibooth.com

Naomi Rebecca Booth (born 16 November 1980) is an English fiction writer and literary academic. She is currently Associate Professor in Creative Writing at Durham University. She debuted with the novella The Lost Art of Sinking (2015), winning a Saboteur Award, and the eco-horror novel Sealed (2017), shortlisted for the Not the Booker Prize. One of her short stories "Sour Hall" (2020, republished 2022) won an Edge Hill Short Story Prize.

== Early life and education ==
Booth was born in Bradford and grew up in Dewsbury. She went to school in Huddersfield.

Booth graduated with a Bachelor of Arts (BA) in English from Cambridge. She completed a Master of Arts (MA) in Creative Writing at the University of Sussex followed by a PhD, supervised by Nicholas Royle.

== Career ==
Booth's first work of fiction was the 2015 novella The Lost Art of Sinking. The Lost Art of Sinking won Best Novella at the 2016 Saboteur Awards.

In 2016, Dead Ink acquired the rights to publish Booth's debut novel Sealed in 2017. Described as eco-horror and science fiction, the novel follows a couple living in the Australian mountains as paranoia grows about a skin disease outbreak. Booth had been thinking about the effects of environmental contamination and pollution. Sealed was shortlisted for the 2018 Not the Booker Prize. In addition, Booth's short story "Cluster" was longlisted for the 2018 Sunday Times Short Story Award and was a finalist for the 2017/18 Galley Beggar Press Short Story Prize.

Booth's second novel Exit Management was published in 2020. Exit Management deals with the topic of class as its lead character attempts to escape her past. She published her academic monograph Swoon: A Poetics of Passing Out the following year and contributed to the Northern short story collection Test Signal. Republished in Booth's own 2022 short story collection Animals at Night, "Sour Hall" won the Edge Hill Short Story Prize in the Readers' Choice category.

In 2024, Corsair (a Hachette UK imprint) acquired the rights to publish Booth's third novel Raw Content in 2025. The psychological drama follows the character Grace as she grapples with unexpected motherhood.

== Influences ==
Booth grew up reading Ted Hughes and the Brontë sisters and said Sarah Hall had a "big impact" on her. She also praised contemporaries Jessica Andrews, Tom Benn and Melissa Wan.

== Bibliography ==
=== Novels ===
- Sealed (2017)
- Exit Management (2020)
- Raw Content (2025)

=== Novellas ===
- The Lost Art of Sinking (2015)

=== Short story collections ===
- Animals at Night (2022)

=== Short stories ===
- "Cluster", published in Best British Short Stories 2019, edited by Nicholas Royle
- "WARNING: Localised Quicksand" in An Invite to Eternity: Tales of Nature Disrupted (2019), edited by Gary Budden and Marian Womack
- "Sour Hall" in Hag: Forgotten Folktales Retold (2020), edited by Carolyne Larrington
- "Clean Work" in Test Signal (2021), edited by Nathan Connolly

=== Non-fiction ===
- Swoon: A Poetics of Passing Out (2021)
