= Mitchell Scholarship =

Fellowship for Americans to study in Ireland

- Awarded for: graduate study in Ireland for Americans
- Sponsored by: U.S.-Ireland Alliance
- Established: 1998
- Website: www.us-irelandalliance.org

The US-Ireland Alliance Scholarship, known until March 2026 as the George J. Mitchell Scholarship were awarded annually by the US–Ireland Alliance, provided funding for graduate study for Americans in both Northern Ireland and the Ireland from 2000 to 2025.

The scholarship was established in 1998 and the first class of scholars began their studies in 2000. In 2024, the program stopped accepting applications when the program was paused while the alliance sought an endowment for the program.

== Description ==
A Mitchell Scholarship award includes tuition, housing, airfare, and a cash stipend. The Mitchell Scholars Program was designed to introduce and connect future American leaders to Ireland, and to recognize and foster intellectual achievement, leadership, and a commitment to public service.

Mitchell Scholars were placed at universities in both the Ireland and Northern Ireland.

On average, around 350 eligible American students applied for the 12 scholarships each year, with an acceptance rate of around 3%.

== History ==
The Mitchell Scholarship is organized under the auspices of the US-Ireland Alliance, a non-profit, non-partisan organization based in Arlington, VA. The program was established in 1998, created by US-Ireland Alliance president Trina Vargo with early support from the Irish and British Governments.

The program was named in honor of former U.S. Senator George J. Mitchell's contribution to the Northern Ireland peace process. However his named was removed from the scholarship in February 2026 over alleged connections to convicted sex offender Jeffrey Epstein.

=== Funding ===
In 2010, the Irish Parliament passed legislation to match any contributions, up to 20 million euros, to an endowment for the Scholarship program.

The United States Department of State cut funding to the program in 2014 with support by the Government of Northern Ireland ceasing in 2015.

== Alumni ==
Notable alumni of the Mitchell Scholarship program include:

- Winnie M Li (2001), author, studied at University College Cork
- Tommy Vitolo (2001), Representative of the Massachusetts House of Representatives, studied at Dublin City University
- Matt Haney (2007), member of the California Assembly, studied at University of Galway and Queen's University Belfast
- Rhiannon McGavin (2022), poet, studied at Trinity College Dublin

== See also ==
- Churchill Scholarship
- Fulbright Program
- Gates Cambridge Scholarship
- Knight-Hennessy Scholars
- Harkness Fellowship
- Harry S. Truman Scholarship
- Marshall Scholarship
- Schwarzman Scholarship
- Yenching Scholars
