= Eleanor Thom =

Scottish writer (born 1979)

- Born: 1979 (age 46–47); London, England
- Education: University College London; University of Glasgow; University of the West of Scotland
- Children: Oona Dooks
- Writing career
- Notable work: The Tin-Kin
- Notable awards: Scottish First Book of the Year
- Website: www.eleanorthom.com

Eleanor Thom (born 1979 in London) is a Scottish writer. She won the 2006 New Writing Ventures competition with 'Burns', a chapter from her first novel The Tin-Kin. The book recalls experiences of her mother's family who were Scottish Travellers and settled in Elgin between 1920 and 1950. In 2009 The Tin-Kin won the Scottish First Book of the Year, and was shortlisted for the Not the Booker Prize.

In 2008, Thom was awarded a Robert Louis Stevenson Fellowship to begin work on a second novel. Her second novel, Connective Tissue, was published in 2023.

In 2025, Thom and her daughter Oona Dooks were awarded the inaugural Sustainable Story Award by World of Books for Sea Legs, "a co-written memoir exploring interdependence, disabled whales, and our relationship with the marine environment."

== Education ==
Thom studied Linguistics, French and Italian at University College London and has an MA in Creative Writing from the University of Glasgow. In 2018 she completed a PhD in Creative Writing from the University of the West of Scotland.
