= Not the Booker Prize =

Annual literary award

The Not the Booker Prize was an annual literary award presented by The Guardian. Books eligible for the Booker Prize were nominated and voted on by Guardian readers to select a shortlist. After the shortlist was selected, the books were debated on the Guardian books blog in the following weeks, with the winner selected both by reader votes and a panel of judges.

The prize was last awarded in 2020.

== Honorees ==
Not the Booker Prize winners and shortlists
Year	Author	Book	Result	Ref.
2009	Rana Dasgupta	Solo	Winner	
2009	Jenn Ashworth	A Kind of Intimacy	Shortlist	
2009	Simon Crump	Neverland	Shortlist	
2009	M. J. Hyland	This Is How	Shortlist	
2009	James Palumbo	Tomas	Shortlist	
2009	Eleanor Thom	The Tin-Kin	Shortlist	
2010	Lee Rourke	The Canal	Winner	
2010	Matthew Hooton	Deloume Road	Winner	
2010	Grant Gillespie	The Cuckoo Boy	Shortlist	
2010	Justine Kilkerr	Advice for Strays	Shortlist	
2010	Matthew Yorke	Pictures of Lily	Shortlist	
2011	Michael Stewart	King Crow	Winner	
2011	Julian Gough	Jude in London	Shortlist	
2011	Cody James	The Dead Beat	Shortlist	
2011	Tyler Keevil	Fireball	Shortlist	
2011	Lars Iyer	Spurious	Shortlist	
2011	Chris Morton	English Slacker	Shortlist	
2012	Ewan Morrison	Tales from the Mall	Winner	
2012	Ben Myers	Pig Iron	Shortlist	
2012	A. J. Kirby	Paint the Town Red	Shortlist	
2012	J. W. Ironmonger	The Notable Brain of Maximilian Ponder	Shortlist	
2012	Stephen May	Life! Death! Prizes!	Shortlist	
2012	Alex Preston	The Revelations	Shortlist	
2012	Simon Swift	The Casablanca Case	Shortlist	
2013	Kate Atkinson	Life After Life	Winner (Note: Zoe Venditozzi won the popular vote, but the judges opted to award the prize to Kate Atkinson.)	
2013	Neil Gaiman	The Ocean at the End of the Lane	Shortlist	
2013	Lucy Cruickshanks	The Trader of Saigon	Shortlist	
2013	Suzie Tullett	Little White Lies and Butterflies	Shortlist	
2013	Zoe Venditozzi	Anywhere's Better Than Here	Shortlist	
2013	Meike Ziervogel	Magda	Shortlist	
2014	Simon Sylvester	The Visitors	Winner	
2014	Donna Tartt	The Goldfinch	Shortlist	
2014	Tony Black	The Last Tiger	Shortlist	
2014	Louis Armand	Cairo	Shortlist	
2014	Iain Maloney	First Time Solo	Shortlist	
2014	Mahesh Rao	The Smoke Is Rising	Shortlist	
2015	Kirstin Innes	Fishnet	Winner	
2015	Kat Gordon	The Artificial Anatomy of Parks	Shortlist	
2015	Oliver Langmead	Dark Star	Shortlist	
2015	Paul McVeigh	The Good Son	Shortlist	
2015	Tasha Kavanagh	Things We Have in Common	Shortlist	
2015	Melanie Finn	Shame	Shortlist	
2016	Tiffany McDaniel	The Summer That Melted Everything	Winner	
2016	Deborah Andrews	Walking the Lights	Shortlist	
2016	Louis Armand	The Combinations	Shortlist	
2016	Dan Clements	What Will Remain	Shortlist	
2016	Dan Micklethwaite	The Less Than Perfect Legend of Donna Creosote	Shortlist	
2016	Jemma Wayne	Chains of Sand	Shortlist	
2017	Winnie M Li	Dark Chapter	Winner	
2017	Sara Gethin	Not Thomas	Shortlist	
2017	Harriet Paige	Man with a Seagull on His Head	Shortlist	
2017	Rowena Macdonald	The Threat Level Remains Severe	Shortlist	
2017	Ann O'Loughlin	The Ludlow Ladies' Society	Shortlist	
2018	Rebecca Ley	Sweet Fruit, Sour Land	Winner	
2018	Naomi Booth	Sealed	Shortlist	
2018	Will Dean	Dark Pines	Shortlist	
2018	Ariel Kahn	Raising Sparks	Shortlist	
2018	Dervla McTiernan	The Ruin	Shortlist	
2018	Marc Nash	Three Dreams in the Key of G	Wildcard	
2019	Lara Williams	Supper Club	Winner	
2019	Robbie Arnott	Flames	Shortlist	
2019	Liam Brown	Skin	Shortlist	
2019	Karen Havelin	Please Read This Leaflet Carefully	Shortlist	
2019	Daniel James	The Unauthorised Biography of Ezra Maas	Shortlist	
2019	Ali Smith	Spring	Shortlist	
2020	Richard Owain Roberts	Hello Friend We Missed You	Winner	
2020	Shahnaz Ahsan	Hashim & Family	Shortlist	
2020	Chris Bonnello	Underdogs: Tooth and Nail	Shortlist	
2020	Abi Daré	The Girl with the Louding Voice	Shortlist	
2020	Emma Donoghue	Akin	Shortlist	
2020	Maggie O'Farrell	Hamnet	Shortlist	
