= Witch's Night Out =

- Title card
- Genre: Animated Halloween special
- Written by: John Leach; Isobel Jean Rankin
- Directed by: John Leach
- Starring: Gilda Radner; Bob Church; John Leach; Naomi Leach; Tony Molesworth; Catherine O'Hara; Fiona Reid; Gerry Salsberg
- Theme music composer: Peter Rochon
- Country of origin: Canada
- Original language: English

Production
- Producer: John Leach
- Editor: Sharon Lackie
- Production company: Leach/Rankin Productions

Original release
- Network: CBC Television; NBC
- Release: October 27, 1978

Witch's Night Out is a Canadian animated television Halloween special that premiered on NBC on October 27, 1978. Produced in a Toronto studio, it was the sequel to the 1974 special The Gift of Winter with the vocal talents from Dan Aykroyd and Valri Bromfield. It featured the voices of Fiona Reid as Nicely and Catherine O'Hara as Malicious, with Gilda Radner as the titular witch.

Like the earlier special, Witch's Night Out was produced on 35mm film by Jonathan Rogers (formerly known as John Leach) and Jean Rankin for NBC. It later aired on the Disney Channel every year from 1983 to the late 1990s. This cartoon film was released on videotape on August 5, 1986 by Family Home Entertainment and PPI Entertainment in the late 1990s.

The film was resurrected once again by the original creator Jonathan Rogers and animation director Jimmy Cross (with his Uncle Porkchop Productions animation studio) and together with a new remastered film they formed Cross/Rogers and released it to Mill Creek Entertainment and This TV network and in 2016 for both Hulu and Shout TV.

Mill Creek Entertainment released this cartoon along with ten more classic Halloween-themed cartoons on DVD on September 16, 2014. Its predecessor The Gift of Winter had its own DVD release a month later from that same company.

== Plot ==
The plot involves a depressed witch who is 'summoned' by a pair of children, named Small and Tender, who are upset at not being able to scare anyone on Halloween. The witch turns them into a werewolf and ghost (previously their Halloween costumes), and their babysitter Bazooey into a Frankenstein's monster. The witch then takes them to the Halloween party-in-progress at her isolated mansion on the edge of town. The citizens of the town, however, get offended at the thought of real monsters in their town, and form a mob, under the leadership of the strait-laced 'Goodly'. The witch loses her magic wand, which gets attached to a woman named Malicious, and is unable to turn Bazooey and the kids back to humans. The group of supernatural beings is chased through the town and forest by the mob, eventually losing them. Malicious and her partner, Rotten, misuse the wand's powers, which causes a lot of damage to the town, but also summons the witch and the kids to their location. Regaining her wand, the witch uses its power to turn Malicious and Rotten into monsters (though she turns them back soon after), while turning the Frankenstein monster, ghost and werewolf back into Bazooey, Tender and Small. Eventually, the witch uses her powers to restore everything to normal, showing the town that she is not evil. The town quickly accepts the witch, and she starts turning people into what they want to be for Halloween.

A disco song entitled "Witch Magic" was sung in this film.
