= Trina Vargo =

American political scientist

Trina Y. Vargo is the founder and President of the US-Ireland Alliance, a non-profit, non-partisan organization dedicated to educating Americans about Ireland and strengthening the relationship on the basis of education, culture and business. Vargo created the organization in 1998. In that capacity, she created the George J. Mitchell Scholarship program, recognized as one of the most prestigious scholarships for study abroad for young Americans. She also created an annual event in Hollywood, the Oscar Wilde Awards, that celebrates the contributions of the Irish in film and entertainment.

== Biography ==
=== Education ===
Vargo graduated magna cum laude from the University of Pittsburgh with degrees in political science and history. As the recipient of a Rotary International Fellowship, she attended McGill University in Montreal, where she obtained an M.A. degree in political science.

=== Foreign Policy Advisor ===
From 1987 through April 1998, Vargo served as a Foreign Policy Adviser to Senator Edward M. Kennedy (D-MA) in Washington D.C. During her years with Senator Kennedy, she worked directly with political leaders in Northern Ireland, the Clinton Administration, and the Irish Government, serving as a key behind-the-scenes player in the Northern Ireland peace process. She was instrumental in negotiating a visa for Gerry Adams to visit the United States in 1994. That visit led to the historic IRA cease-fire declaration in August 1994.

While working with Senator Kennedy, in addition to Irish issues, Vargo was involved in many foreign policy matters, including imposing sanctions in 1995 on Libya in the aftermath of the bombing of Pan Am flight 103; efforts to bring free elections to Guyana in 1992, the first in decades; helping Refuseniks (Soviet Jews) from the former Soviet Union to emigrate in the late 1980s and early 1990s; and changing the way the Department of State analyzed and characterized the meaning of other countries’ votes in the United Nations. Vargo remained involved in the Pan Am 103 bombing issue after leaving Kennedy’s employ, writing an op-ed opposing Scotland’s decision to release Abdel Basset al-Megrahi in the Irish Times in 2009, and the Huffington Post in 2015.

In 1993, Vargo assisted Ambassador Madeleine Albright in preparation for her Senate confirmation hearings for the Cabinet post of U.S. Ambassador to the United Nations. She also helped prepare Ambassador Jean Kennedy Smith, the U.S. Ambassador to Ireland, for her June 1993 confirmation Senate hearing. She briefed several subsequent US Ambassadors to Ireland, Democrats and Republicans.

In a personal capacity, from 1988, Vargo has advised U.S. presidential campaign teams on Irish issues. She served as the Obama campaign’s adviser on Irish issues.
