= Winnie M Li =

American writer, novelist and activist

- Born: New Haven, Connecticut
- Education: Harvard University (BA); University College Cork (MA); Goldsmiths, University of London (MA)

Winnie M Li is an American writer, novelist and activist based in England. Her first novel Dark Chapter, released in 2017, was based on her own experience of a stranger rape in 2008. Her second novel Complicit was published in 2022. Her third novel What We Left Unsaid was published in 2025.

== Early life and education ==
Winnie Li was born in New Haven, Connecticut, to Taiwanese immigrants. Her family lived in Pennsylvania before settling in Wayne, New Jersey. After graduating from high school, she attended Harvard University where she majored in Folklore and Mythology. After graduating Phi Beta Kappa from Harvard, she moved to Cork, Ireland to pursue a Master of Arts (MA) in English at the National University of Ireland, Cork (now University College Cork). In 2000, Li was selected in the inaugural class of George Mitchell Scholars.

Later upon deciding to go into writing, Li completed a second MA in Creative and Life Writing at Goldsmiths, University of London. She completed a PhD in Media and Communications at the London School of Economics (LSE).

== Rape ==
In April 2008, Li was raped by a 15-year-old boy in Colin Glen Forest Park in Belfast. Li was in Belfast to attend a conference to celebrate the 10-year anniversary of the Northern Ireland peace process. Li suffered 39 separate injuries from the assault. The case caused outcry in Belfast and received national media attention. A community vigil was held in the park a week after the assault. The perpetrator was arrested and ultimately convicted.

== Writing and activism ==
In the aftermath of the assault Li began writing about her experience. Li contributed an essay about her assault to the book Sushi and Tapas in 2011. Li wrote several articles for the Huffington Post starting in 2014 on her assault and broader themes of sexual violence. In 2015 Li co-founded the Clear Lines Festival, addressing themes of sexual assault and consent through the arts and discussion. Li regularly appears on BBC and Sky News commenting on themes of sexual abuse and violence. Li has also had featured interviews in The Guardian, The Times, The Irish Times, the Irish Examiner, Los Angeles Review of Books, and Ms.. In 2018, Li received an honorary doctorate from the National University of Ireland for her contribution to the arts in the advocacy of women's rights.

Li's writings have appeared in a variety of magazines and newspapers including The Guardian, The Times, The Mail on Sunday, The Stylist, The Huffington Post and Grazia.. On the anniversary of her assault, Li goes on a commemorative walk in a different place each year. Her social media posts of these anniversary walks often go viral on X and Instagram, prompting replies of solidarity from around the world, as well as misogynistic backlash.

=== Dark Chapter (2017) ===
In 2017, Li published her debut novel Dark Chapter, a fictionalised account of the rape written from the perspective of both the victim and perpetrator. The book won The Guardian's Not the Booker Prize in 2017. Dark Chapter was also nominated for an Edgar Allan Poe Award for Best First Novel and shortlisted for the Authors' Club Best First Novel Award. The book has been translated into ten languages. Northern Ireland Screen awarded development funding for a feature film adaptation of Dark Chapter, with Li writing the screenplay.. In 2025, the novel was reissued in a new edition by Datura Books..

=== Complicit (2022) ===
Li's second novel Complicit was inspired by the MeToo movement and the investigation into predators like Harvey Weinstein's in the film industry. She also drew upon her experience as a former film producer in writing the novel. World rights to the book were sold in a 48-hour pre-empt to Orion Publishing Group, and US rights were contested in a five-way auction, with Emily Bestler at Atria Publishing Group ultimately winning. Complicit was published in Summer 2022. It was selected by The New York Times for their "Group Text" monthly book club. It also earned positive reviews from The Guardian, The Times, The Irish Times, Daily Mail, and theBelfast Telegraph. Li was interviewed by Mariella Frostrup at Times Radio, Ryan Tubridy at RTÉ Radio 1, and on the PBS TV show Story in the Public Square. Complicit appeared on the "Best Crime Novels of 2022" list by The Irish Times and CrimeReads, and "Best Books of 2022" lists by Grazia and Glamour magazines.. Complicit was shortlisted for the The Royal Society of Literature's Encore Award for the best second novel of the year.

The audiobook version of Complicit was recorded by actor Katie Leung..

=== What We Left Unsaid (2025) ===
Li’s third novel What We Left Unsaid (2025) took on a lighter tone, by following a trio of estranged Asian-American siblings on a road trip down Route 66, to retrace an earlier trip they had undertaken as children. At the same time, the novel addresses issues of Asian-American identity, immigrant family secrets, and the history of the American West, while hinging on adult sibling relationships that can be mended. It was positively reviewed by Kirkus Reviews, Publishers Weekly, and The Irish Independent, and recommended by Conde Nast Traveler. Li has said the book was her attempt to move away from writing so directly about the issue of sexual violence, while still acknowledging the impact of past traumas.

== Personal life ==
Li has lived abroad for over two decades. She settled in Horningsham, Wiltshire with her partner and their son (born 2020).

Later they moved to Birmingham, where Li took up a position as Assistant Professor in Creative Writing at the University of Birmingham.

== Bibliography ==
- Dark Chapter (2017)
- Complicit (2022)
- What We Left Unsaid (2025)
