= Will Dean (author) =

British crime novelist

- Education: London School of Economics
- Writing career
- Language: English
- Period: 2018-
- Genres: Crime detection; thrillers
- Website: willrdean.com

Will Dean is a British-born crime writer, now based in Sweden, best known for a series of novels featuring a deaf journalist named Tuva Moodyson.

== Biography ==
Will Dean was born in 1979 or 1980, and grew up in the East Midlands, UK, living in nine different villages before moving to London as a student to study Law at the London School of Economics. He met his wife, a Swedish national, at university and went on to work at various jobs after graduation, before finding a role designing and managing finance systems. In 2009, Dean bought a plot of land in a forest in Sweden and started to build a house. He and his wife moved permanently to the house in 2012. At this time, Dean worked at home repairing vintage watches.

In 2019, Dean announced that he had become a Swedish citizen.

== Writing career ==
After moving to Sweden, Dean took up writing. He finished at least one book that remains unpublished before starting work on his first published novel. That novel, Dark Pines, published in early 2018, features Tuva Moodyson: a deaf journalist at a provincial Swedish newspaper who gets caught up in the investigation of a murder. Dean has said that the character of Tuva was complete almost from the start:

Tuva came to me almost fully-formed. Writing Dark Pines, I visualised a huge overgrown pine forest in my mind’s eye. I zoomed in and saw a rough gravel track snaking through the trees. I zoomed in some more and saw a pick-up truck driving. I looked through the window and saw a young woman with hearing aids. I didn’t set out to create a series. I just started writing from Tuva’s point-of-view, and within a few chapters I knew this was different to anything I’d worked on before. Tuva’s voice came through very naturally. I got lucky, I think.

One reviewer remarked that "[t]he novel stands out for its heroine." It was shortlisted for the Not the Booker Prize. The nominating article noted that Dean "comes across both as an aghast outsider and an admiring immigrant to his Swedish setting." Dark Pines has been followed by five more novels featuring the same protagonist.

As he is not deaf, Dean employed a deaf blogger, Deafinitely Girly as a sensitivity reader. He initially contacted her via Twitter before Dark Pines was published, and has worked with her on all the novels in the series since.

Dean has also written a number of standalone thrillers. The first of these, The Last Thing to Burn, was published in January 2020. He has said that he imagined the whole novel from one scene in his head:

The scene came to Dean in 2016, one night as he lay awake in bed. “I was in that strange time between wakefulness and sleep, and I saw very flat, featureless fields with a little tumbledown cottage. Then I saw a woman there,” he says. “She looked like she was living a fairly normal life there, but I knew she couldn’t leave. I wanted to understand why, and I wanted to understand her story. That night between midnight and 6am, the whole book came to me.”

This novel is narrated by a Vietnamese women trying to escape from the English farmer who has held her captive for years. Dean had it read by a Vietnamese friend before publication to ensure that it was authentic. The Last Thing to Burn was shortlisted for the Theakston's Old Peculier Crime Novel of the Year in 2022.

== Personal life ==
Dean lives in a Swedish forest, about 90 minutes from Gothenburg, with his wife Emilia and their son Alfred.

== Adaptations ==
It was reported in 2018 that Lionsgate had optioned Dean's first Tuva Moodyson novel Dark Pines for a multi-part television series. In 2023, the same novel was stated to be in development by the British television production company, Red Planet Pictures, with Rose Ayling-Ellis in the lead role and Charlotte Jones acting as screenwriter.

== Awards ==
Year	Book	Award	Result	Ref.
2018	Dark Pines	Not the Booker Prize	Shortlisted	
2018	Dark Pines	The Cabot Cove Award for Best Small Town Mystery (The Dead Good Reader Awards)	Shortlisted	
2019	Red Snow	The Nosy Parker Award for Best Amateur Detective (The Dead Good Reader Awards)	Shortlisted	
2020	Red Snow	Theakston's Old Peculier Crime Novel of the Year	Longlisted	
2021	Black River	Theakston's Old Peculier Crime Novel of the Year	Longlisted	
2022	The Last Thing to Burn	Theakston's Old Peculier Crime Novel of the Year	Shortlisted	
2022	The Last Thing to Burn	Goldsboro Books Glass Bell Award	Longlisted	
2022	The Last Thing to Burn	The Dead Good Recommends Award for Most Recommended Book (The Dead Good Reader Awards)	Shortlisted	
2022	The Last Thing to Burn	Thriller Book of the Year 2021 (Fingerprint Awards, Capital Crime Festival)	Shortlisted	
2025	The Chamber	Best Standalone Thriller Novel (International Thriller Writers Award)	Shortlisted	

== Works ==
=== Tuva Moodyson series ===
- —— (2018). Dark Pines. London: Point Blank. ISBN 978-1786073853.
- —— (2019). Red Snow. London: Point Blank. ISBN 978-1786074799.
- —— (2020). Black River. London: Point Blank. ISBN 978-1786077110.
- —— (2021). Bad Apples. London: Point Blank. ISBN 978-1786079817.
- —— (2022). Wolf Pack. London: Point Blank. ISBN 978-0861541997.
- —— (2024). Ice Town. London: Point Blank. ISBN 978-1399717311.

=== Standalone novels ===
- —— (2021). The Last Thing to Burn. London: Hodder & Stoughton. ISBN 978-1529307054.
- —— (2022). First Born. London: Hodder & Stoughton. ISBN 978-1529307146.
- —— (2023). The Last Passenger. Hodder & Stoughton. ISBN 978-1529382822.
- —— (2024). The Chamber. London: Hodder & Stoughton. ISBN 978-1399734127. (UK paperback and e-book published as One at a Time, ISBN 978-1399734141)
- —— (2026). Adrift. London: Hodder & Stoughton. ISBN 978 1529382891.
