= Lara Williams =

British writer

Lara Williams is a British writer, known for her novels, short stories and journalism. Her novel Supper Club won the Guardian's Not the Booker Prize in 2019.

== Early life ==
Williams graduated with a Bachelor of Arts (BA) in English and Film Studies and a Master of Arts (MA) in Creative Writing, both from Manchester Metropolitan University.

== Career ==
Williams is based in Manchester and her writing has featured in The Guardian, Vice, The Independent, the Times Literary Supplement and McSweeney's. She also teaches Creative Writing at Manchester Metropolitan University.

== Published work ==
- Treats (2016)
- A Selfie as Big as the Ritz (2017)
- Supper Club (2019)
- The Odyssey (2022)
