= Kirstin Innes =

Scottish novelist and journalist

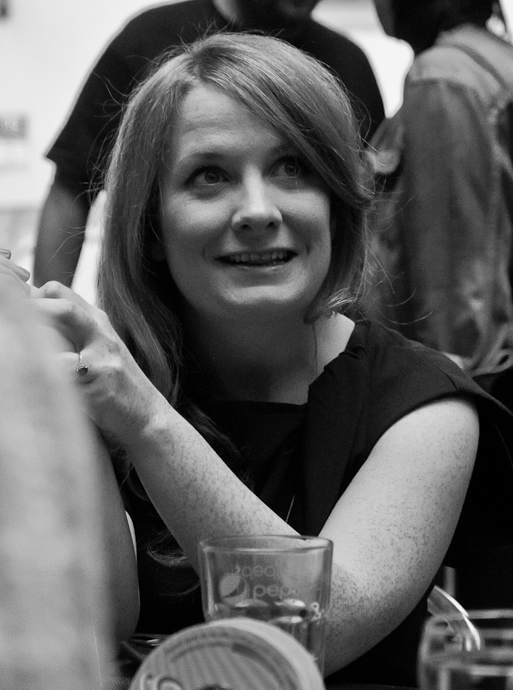
- Innes in 2014
- Born: 1980 (age 45–46); Edinburgh, Scotland, UK
- Education: University of Aberdeen
- Occupations: Novelist, journalist
- Partner: Alan Bissett
- Children: 2

Kirstin Innes (born 1980) is a Scottish novelist and journalist.

== Early life ==
Innes was born in Edinburgh in 1980, and raised by a single mother. She attended James Gillespie's High School and then University of Aberdeen.

== Career ==
In 2005, Innes moved to Glasgow to work at The Arches. She also worked as Assistant Editor at The List.

Innes's writing is influenced by her mother and grandmother's left-wing politics.

Innes's debut novel, Fishnet (2019), won The Guardian's Not The Booker Prize in 2015 and was praised by The New York Times for its depiction of sex workers as "women with rich inner lives and interests". Innes has written about how her friendship with the sex workers' rights activist Laura Lee influenced the novel.

Her second novel, Scabby Queen, was published by 4th Estate in 2020. It was longlisted for the 2020 Gordon Burn Prize.

In November 2021, Salamander Street published Brickwork: A Biography of The Arches, co-written by Innes and former The Arches colleague David Bratchpiece.

== Personal life ==
Innes' partner is the author and playwright Alan Bissett, with whom she has two children. The couple, who met in 2007, have discussed their experiences with IVF publicly with the aim of reducing the stigma around infertility.

== Bibliography ==
Year	Title	Publisher	ISBN	Note
2019	Fishnet	Scout Press	ISBN 9781982116156	
2020	Scabby Queen	Fourth Estate	ISBN 9780008342296	
	Brickwork: A Biography of The Arches	Salamander Street		To be published in 2021
