= 1989–90 British Collegiate American Football League =

The 1989–90 BCAFL was the fifth full season of the British Collegiate American Football League, organised by the British Students American Football Association.

== Changes from Last season ==
Division Changes

- The Southern Conference was split into Eastern & Western Conferences

Team Changes

- University of Birmingham joined the Western Conference, playing as the Lions
- University of Paisley joined the Scottish Conference, playing as the Panthers
- University of Sheffield joined the Northern Conference, playing as the Pirates
- University of Southampton joined the Western Conference, playing as the Stags
- University of Warwick joined the Eastern Conference, playing as the Wolves

This increased the number of teams in BCAFL to 16.

== Regular season ==
Locations of Scottish teams in BCAFL 1989–90
Locations of English and Welsh teams in BCAFL 1989–90

=== Scottish Conference ===
Team	Pld	Won	Lst	Drw	PF	PA	Win%	
Strathclyde Hawks	6	6	0	0	118	28	1.000	Qualified for Playoffs
Stirling Clansmen	6	4	2	0	111	27	0.750	
Glasgow Tigers	6	1	4	1	34	60	0.250	
Paisley Panthers	6	0	5	1	0	148	0.083	

=== Northern Conference ===
Team	Pld	Won	Lst	Drw	PF	PA	Win%	
Teesside Demons	6	4	0	2	137	40	0.833	Qualified for Playoffs
Hull Sharks	6	4	0	2	88	50	0.833	
Sheffield Pirates	6	2	4	0	14	103	0.333	
Newcastle Scholars	6	0	6	0	14	60	0.000	

=== Eastern Conference ===
Team	Pld	Won	Lst	Drw	PF	PA	Win%	
Warwick Wolves	8	7	0	1	154	32	0.938	Qualified for Playoffs
UEA Pirates	8	4	4	0	79	62	0.500	
Leicester Lemmings	8	3	4	1	89	105	0.438	
Loughborough Aces	8	3	5	0	54	101	0.375	

=== Western Conference ===
Team	Pld	Won	Lst	Drw	PF	PA	Win%	
Birmingham Lions	8	6	1	1	193	20	0.812	Qualified for Playoffs
Cardiff Cobras	8	5	3	0	86	60	0.625	
Southampton Stags	8	1	6	1	12	233	0.188	
Reading Knights	8	1	7	0	20	74	0.125	

== Playoffs ==
Semi-finals
N	Teesside Demons	16
E	Warwick Wolves	14
Sc	Strathclyde Hawks	0
W	Birmingham Lions	34

College Bowl IV
Teesside Demons	21
Birmingham Lions	20

- Note – the table does not indicate who played home or away in each fixture.
