= 2004–05 British Collegiate American Football League =

The 2004–05 BCAFL was the 20th full season of the British Collegiate American Football League, organised by the British Students American Football Association.

== Changes from last season ==
Divisional Changes

- The Northern Conference expanded from three Divisions to four (gaining a Central Division)
- The Northern Conference, Borders Division became the Scottish Division

Team Changes

- University of Greenwich joined the Southern Conference, as the Mariners
- Lancaster Bombers moved within the Northern Conference from Borders to Western Division
- Napier University joined the Northern Conference, as the Edinburgh Timberwolves
- Newcastle Raiders moved within the Northern Conference from Borders to Eastern Division
- University of Paisley rejoined the Northern Conference after seven seasons away, as the Pyros
- Sheffield Hallam Warriors moved within the Northern Conference from Eastern to Western Division
- Sheffield Sabres moved within the Northern Conference from Eastern to Western Division
- Sunderland Kings re-joined after one season back
- Surrey Stingers moved within the Southern Conference from Eastern to Southern Division
- UKC Falcons moved within the Southern Conference from Eastern to Southern Division

This increased the number of teams in BCAFL to 36.

== Regular season ==
Locations of Scottish teams in BCAFL 2004–05
Locations of English and Welsh teams in BCAFL 2004–05

=== Northern Conference, Scottish Division ===
Team	Pld	Won	Lst	Drw	PF	PA	Win%	
Glasgow Tigers	8	8	0	0	290	47	1.000	Qualified for Playoffs
Caledonian Roughriders	8	4	4	0	128	114	0.500	
Edinburgh Timberwolves	7	3	4	0	94	161	0.429	
Stirling Clansmen	8	3	5	0	140	160	0.375	
Paisley Pyros	7	0	7	0	8	271	0.000	

=== Northern Conference, Eastern Division ===
Team	Pld	Won	Lst	Drw	PF	PA	Win%	
Leeds Celtics	8	7	1	0	198	83	0.875	Qualified for Playoffs
Newcastle Raiders	8	5	3	0	193	96	0.625	Qualified for Playoffs
UT Cougars	8	4	4	0	184	125	0.500	
UCH Sharks	7	2	5	0	72	112	0.286	
Sunderland Kings	7	1	6	0	30	254	0.143	

=== Northern Conference, Western Division ===
Team	Pld	Won	Lst	Drw	PF	PA	Win%	
Sheffield Hallam Warriors	8	6	1	1	139	84	0.812	Qualified for Playoffs
Lancaster Bombers	8	6	2	0	216	105	0.750	Qualified for Playoffs
Staffordshire Stallions	8	4	3	1	152	147	0.562	Qualified for Playoffs
Sheffield Sabres	8	0	8	0	54	265	0.000	

=== Northern Conference, Central Division ===
Team	Pld	Won	Lst	Drw	PF	PA	Win%	
Loughborough Aces	8	6	1	1	230	41	0.812	Qualified for Playoffs
Nottingham Outlaws	8	5	3	0	130	55	0.625	Qualified for Playoffs
Derby Braves	8	4	4	0	153	111	0.500	
Leicester Lightning	8	0	7	1	14	178	0.062	

=== Southern Conference, Central Division ===
Team	Pld	Won	Lst	Drw	PF	PA	Win%	
Birmingham Lions	8	8	0	0	257	54	1.000	Qualified for Playoffs
Oxford Cavaliers	8	6	2	0	121	125	0.750	Qualified for Playoffs
Warwick Wolves	8	4	4	0	160	160	0.500	
Tarannau Aberystwyth	8	2	6	0	53	98	0.250	

=== Southern Conference, Eastern Division ===
Team	Pld	Won	Lst	Drw	PF	PA	Win%	
Hertfordshire Hurricanes	8	7	1	0	413	33	0.875	Qualified for Playoffs
UEA Pirates	8	5	3	0	122	181	0.625	Qualified for Playoffs
Essex Blades	8	5	3	0	139	147	0.625	Qualified for Playoffs
Greenwich Mariners	7	2	5	0	102	201	0.286	
APU Phantoms	7	0	7	0	12	366	0.000	

=== Southern Conference, Western Division ===
Team	Pld	Won	Lst	Drw	PF	PA	Win%	
Bristol Bullets	8	6	2	0	195	108	0.750	Qualified for Playoffs
Bath Killer Bees	8	5	3	0	145	115	0.625	Qualified for Playoffs
Plymouth Blitz	8	4	4	0	82	99	0.500	
Cardiff Cobras	8	1	7	0	50	97	0.125	

=== Southern Conference, Southern Division ===
Team	Pld	Won	Lst	Drw	PF	PA	Win%	
Southampton Stags	8	6	2	0	221	114	0.750	Qualified for Playoffs
Surrey Stingers	8	4	3	1	166	156	0.562	
Brighton Tsunami	8	3	4	1	108	151	0.438	
Reading Knights	8	2	6	0	142	182	0.250	
UKC Falcons	8	1	7	0	96	213	0.125	

== Playoffs ==
1st round
Birmingham Lions	37
Essex Blades	0
Bath Killer Bees	19
Bristol Bullets	22
Southampton Stags	34
Oxford Cavaliers	13
UEA Pirates	5
Herts.Hurricanes	56
Loughborough Aces	20
Nottingham Outlaws	6
Newcastle Raiders	14
Leeds Celtics	27
Lancaster Bombers	12
Sheffield Hallam Warriors	6
Staffordshire Stallions	6
Glasgow Tigers	14

Quarter-finals
Birmingham Lions	38
Bristol Bullets	8
Southampton Stags	12
Herts. Hurricanes	48
Loughborough Aces	21
Leeds Celtics	14
Lancaster Bombers	12
Glasgow Tigers	47

Semi-finals
Birmingham Lions	26
Herts. Hurricanes	14
Loughborough Aces	21
Glasgow Tigers	24

College Bowl XIX
Birmingham Lions	34
Glasgow Tigers	7

- Note – the table does not indicate who played home or away in each fixture.
