= US–Ireland Alliance =

Non-profit organization

US-Ireland Alliance is a non-partisan and non-profit organization focused on strengthening the ties between the United States, Ireland, and Northern Ireland.

== History ==
The Alliance was founded by Trina Vargo in 1998. From 1987 to 1998, Vargo had served as Foreign Policy Adviser to Senator Edward M. Kennedy (D-MA) in Washington D.C. During her years with Senator Kennedy, she worked directly with political leaders in Northern Ireland, the Clinton Administration, and the Irish Government, serving as a key behind-the-scenes player in the Northern Ireland peace process.

Along with the creation of the Alliance, Vargo created the George J. Mitchell Scholarship Program and the Oscar Wilde Awards that honors the Irish in the film and entertainment industries.

According to her, the future of the relationship between the United States and Ireland is tenuous. The original purpose of creating this organization was to take advantage of this dynamic period.

As of 2024, the organization had just over $12 million in assets.

== Programs ==
=== Oscar Wilde Awards ===
The Oscar Wilde Awards are for cinematic contributions by the Irish, British, and Irish-Americans in the entertainment industry. These honors have been awarded by the US-Ireland Alliance since 2006. The event is held on the Thursday before the Academy Awards and has a variety of celebrities in attendance. The event has been held at director J. J. Abrams’ Bad Robot production company in Santa Monica since 2012. The Oscar Wilde Awards led to Abrams filming of Star Wars: The Force Awakens in Ireland.

=== George J. Mitchell Scholarship Program ===
As part of its mission of educating the American public and encouraging future American leaders to learn about Ireland and Northern, the US-Ireland Alliance created the George J. Mitchell Scholarship program .

On February 1, 2026, the US-Ireland Alliance decided to rename it based on allegations, which Mitchell denied, that he along with convicted sex offenders Jeffrey Epstein and Ghislaine Maxwell abused Virginia Giuffre.

==== Scholarship Criteria ====
According to the official website of George Mitchell Scholars, 12 recipients are annually selected for one year of postgraduate study at institutions of higher education in both Ireland and Northern Ireland. The main criteria for selection are scholarship, leadership and service.

Vargo has written about the challenges of creating a major scholarship without the funding of a founding donor.
