= Olaf Tyaransen =

Irish writer

- Born: 10 February 1971 (age 55); Dublin, Ireland
- Education: Coláiste Éinde, Threadneedle Road, Galway
- Occupation: Music journalist

Olaf Tyaransen (born 10 February 1971) is an Irish former journalist and contributing editor with Dublin's Hot Press magazine.

== Career ==
Tyaransen was born in Dublin on 10 February 1971. His family moved to Galway in 1977, where he attended Coláiste Éinde on Threadneedle Road. He contributed film reviews to the local free Galway Advertiser in 1988, and edited another local freesheet called The Word. He began writing for Dublin's Hot Press magazine in 1991. His first book, the poetry collection The Consequences of Slaughtering Butterflies, was published by Salmon Poetry in 1992. In 2000, he released The Story Of O (which he described as "an accidental autobiography"), which was published by Hot Press. In October 2001, Tyaransen visited Ukraine to report on the phenomenon of internet bridal agencies. The resulting report was published in Sex Lines (2002), published by Hot Press.

Tyaransen is a campaigner for the legalisation of drugs, and regularly writes on this subject and engages in radio, television and university debates. In 1997 he formed the Cannabis Legalisation Party with UCC law lecturer Tim Murphy, and stood in the Irish general election as a candidate for the Dublin constituency of Dún Laoghaire. He polled just 348 first preference votes, but said his intention was to make a point. The Cannabis Legalisation Party has since disbanded and he is not affiliated with any other political party.

== Sexual assault allegation ==
In late 2017, Laura Lee, a sex worker and sex workers' rights campaigner, made a complaint to the Garda Síochána that Tyaransen had sexually assaulted her in 2014 when they met for a Hot Press interview. In February 2018, Lee died by suicide; two weeks later, her allegation was reported on Medium.com by Brooke Magnanti and widely repeated online. Tyaransen said he had consensual sex with Lee and sued Magnanti, Twitter, and Broadsheet.ie for defamation. Several of those who had repeated the allegations deleted them and issued apologies.

Tyaransen claims the allegations ruined his career. He stopped writing for Hot Press by mutual agreement although, according to him, the magazine continued to pay him for two years. He wrote an account presenting the events as an unjust cancellation by dogpiling misuse of the #MeToo movement. His book was due to be published in autumn 2025 as Me & #MeToo: A true story based on a false story, but has been deferred to 2026 by the publishers after threats of defamation proceedings from Hot Press, its editor Niall Stokes, and a solicitor who had advised Laura Lee. Responding to Tyaransen's admission of having had sex with Lee after interviewing her, the developers of a sex-worker safety app commented that "journalists should maintain clear professional boundaries with the people they interview".
