= Laura Lee (sex worker) =

Irish sex worker and campaigner for the rights of sex workers

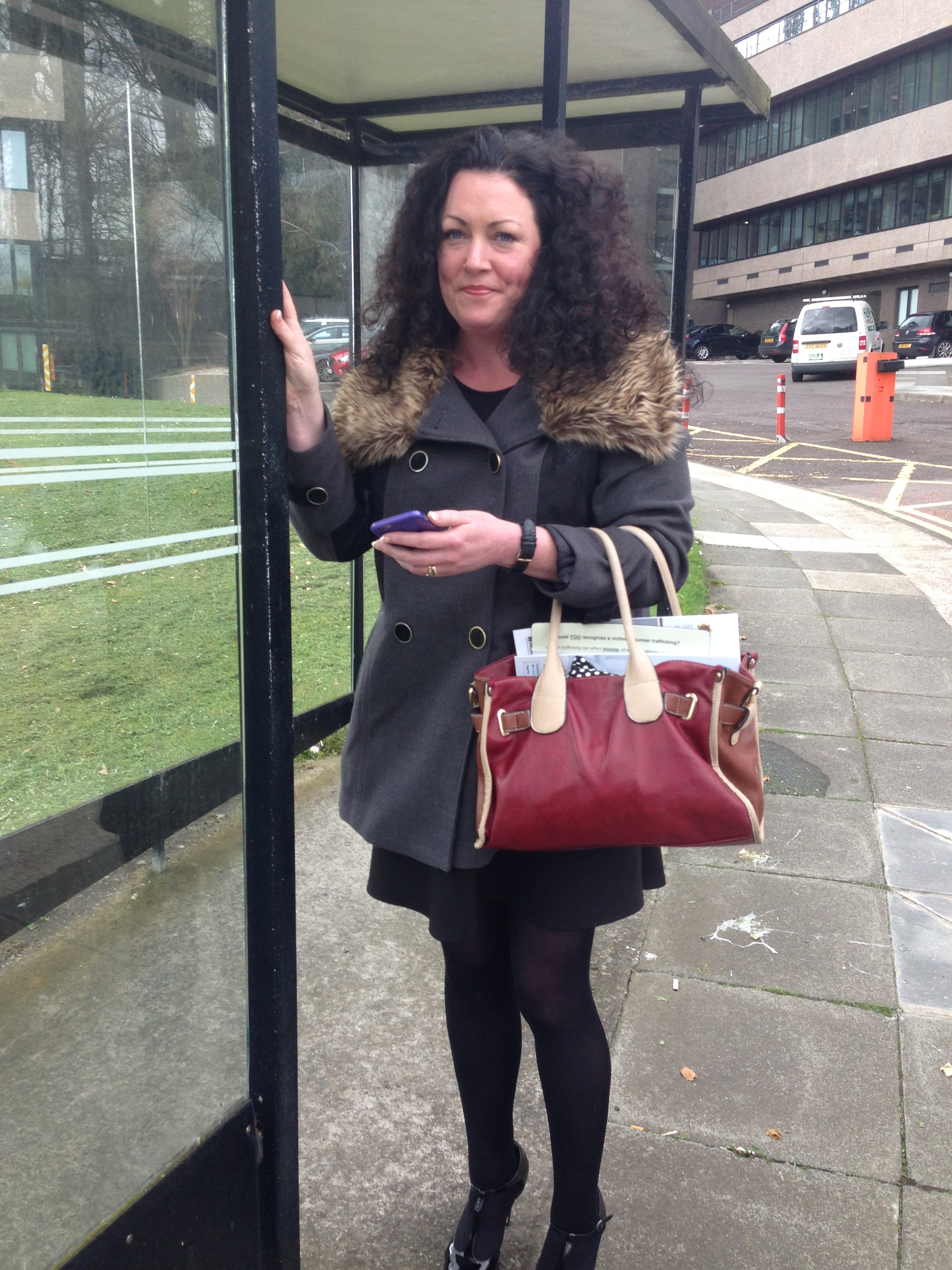
Lee at Stormont Estate, Belfast in April 2015

Laura Lee (25 April 1973 – 7 February 2018) was an Irish sex worker and civil rights activist, who became a campaigner for the rights of people in the sex industry.

== Biography ==
Lee was born in Dublin, but moved to Scotland in 2003 where she lived in Kilmarnock, near Glasgow. She had previously begun her career in sex work at the age of 19 in a massage parlour. After moving to Scotland, she became an independent escort and frequently visited Dublin and Belfast for work and to campaign. She graduated in law from Portobello College in Dublin, and at the time of her death was in her third year of studying towards a degree in psychology. She had a daughter, who was aware of her work. When Lee moved to Scotland, she settled in Oban and worked in a well-paid position in a bank while simultaneously working in the sex industry. She stayed in Oban for six years before she was run out of the town, her second profession being unpopular with local people. After losing her banking job in Oban, she then moved to Kilmarnock and spent the rest of her life there with her cats and her daughter. Lee was a member of the board of Sex Workers Alliance of Ireland. She died by suicide on 7 February 2018 at the age of 44, just a few months after accusing former Hot Press writer Olaf Tyaransen of raping her.

In 2025, as Tyaransen faced defamation pushback as he tried to publish his memoir, it was revealed that he claims to have had "consensual sex" with Lee.

== Career ==
=== Media work ===
Lee's work with clients with disabilities was featured in the 2013 Channel 4 documentary Sex on Wheels. She also appeared in the 2015 Channel 4 documentary A Very British Brothel. She believed there was no reason for governments to intervene against sex in private between two consenting adults, adding "if money changes hands then that is none of the state's business".

=== Government committees ===
On 9 January 2014, Lee appeared as a witness before the Northern Ireland Assembly Committee for Justice, who were examining the proposed Human Trafficking and Exploitation (Further Provisions and Support for Victims) Bill. This was the first and, to date, only time a current sex worker had ever appeared before a UK government committee. On 29 February 2016, Lee gave evidence before the Home Affairs Committee Prostitution Inquiry in Westminster. As part of her advocacy against the bill, she also co-organised the first sex worker protest in Northern Ireland, in October 2014.

=== Legal challenge ===
Following the passing of the Human Trafficking and Exploitation (Criminal Justice and Support for Victims) Act (Northern Ireland) 2015, Lee initiated a judicial review at Belfast's High Court in respect of the provisions criminalising the purchase of sex. She argued that making it a criminal offence to pay for sex, would drive the sex trade further underground and endanger sex workers. Her challenge was based on human rights legislation and she stated her intention to bring the case all the way to the European Court of Human Rights. On 28 September 2016, she won the right to have a judicial review. At the time of Lee's death, the judicial review was reportedly a few weeks away. On 8 March 2018, owing to her death, the legal challenge was formally withdrawn. In a statement following Lee's death, her solicitor, Ciaran Moynagh, described her as "one of this country's most fearless human rights advocates". Journalist Lyra McKee paid Lee tribute, and noted her views on the sex industry had changed because of Lee's campaigning.
