= 1996–97 British Collegiate American Football League =

British Collegiate football league

The 1996–97 BCAFL was the 12th full season of the British Collegiate American Football League, organised by the British Students American Football Association.

== Changes from last season ==
Division Changes
There were no changes to the Divisional setup

Team Changes

- University of Derby joined the Northern Conference, as the Braves
- University of Kent joined the Southern Conference, as the Falcons
- University of Nottingham joined the Northern Conference, as the Outlaws
- Reading Knights moved within the Southern Conference from Eastern to Western Division
- Sheffield Zulus moved within the Northern Conference from Central to Eastern Division
- Stirling Clansmen returned after one season out

This increased the number of teams in BCAFL to 31, an all-time high.

== Regular season ==
Locations of Scottish teams in BCAFL 1996–97
Locations of English and Welsh teams in BCAFL 1996–97

=== Northern Conference, Scottish Division ===
Team	Pld	Won	Lst	Drw	PF	PA	Win%	
Glasgow Tigers	8	5	1	2	93	48	0.750	Qualified for Playoffs
Strathclyde Hawks	8	3	3	2	99	89	0.500	
Stirling Clansmen	8	3	4	1	81	157	0.438	
Paisley Panthers	8	1	6	1	38	89	0.188	Withdrew after this season

=== Northern Conference, Eastern Division ===
Team	Pld	Won	Lst	Drw	PF	PA	Win%	
Lancaster Bombers	8	7	1	0	254	122	0.875	Qualified for Playoffs
Leeds Celtics	8	6	2	0	311	111	0.750	Qualified for Playoffs
Newcastle Mariners	8	5	3	0	270	151	0.625	
Sunderland Wearwolves	8	3	3	2	88	166	0.500	
Sheffield Zulus	7	0	6	1	34	138	0.071	Withdrew after this season
Teesside Demons	7	0	6	1	24	230	0.071	

=== Northern Conference, Central Division ===
Team	Pld	Won	Lst	Drw	PF	PA	Win%	
Loughborough Aces	8	8	0	0	301	14	1.000	Qualified for Playoffs
Nottingham Outlaws	8	5	3	0	119	128	0.625	
Staffordshire Stallions	8	5	3	0	208	153	0.625	
Leicester Lemmings	8	3	5	0	74	172	0.375	
Hull Sharks	8	2	6	0	40	143	0.250	
Derby Braves	8	0	8	0	28	261	0.000	

=== Southern Conference, Eastern Division ===
Team	Pld	Won	Lst	Drw	PF	PA	Win%	
UEA Pirates	8	7	1	0	168	66	0.875	Qualified for Playoffs
Cambridge Pythons	8	6	2	0	178	90	0.750	Withdrew after this season
Hertfordshire Hurricanes	8	5	3	0	168	70	0.625	
Surrey Stingers	8	4	4	0	80	165	0.500	
Kent Falcons	8	1	7	0	34	169	0.125	

=== Southern Conference, Central Division ===
Team	Pld	Won	Lst	Drw	PF	PA	Win%	
Tarannau Aberystwyth	8	8	0	0	176	0	1.000	Qualified for Playoffs
Birmingham Lions	8	6	2	0	132	40	0.750	Qualified for Playoffs
Warwick Wolves	8	5	3	0	68	93	0.625	
Oxford Cavaliers	8	2	6	0	53	130	0.250	
Aston Rhinos	8	0	7	1	7	77	0.062	Withdrew after this season

=== Southern Conference, Western Division ===
Team	Pld	Won	Lst	Drw	PF	PA	Win%	
Bath Killer Bees	8	6	2	0	118	28	0.750	Qualified for Playoffs
Southampton Stags	8	5	2	1	119	43	0.688	
Cardiff Cobras	8	2	4	2	64	49	0.375	
Reading Knights	8	1	6	1	60	219	0.188	
Bristol Bullets	8	1	6	1	38	116	0.188	

== Playoffs ==
Quarter-finals
N.C1	Loughborough Aces	43
N.E2	Leeds Celtics	0
N.E1	Lancaster Bombers	6
N.S1	Glasgow Tigers	12
S.W1	Bath Killer Bees	14
S.E1	UEA Pirates	0
S.C2	Birmingham Lions	13
S.C1	Tarannau Aberystwyth	15

Semi-finals
Loughborough Aces	21
Glasgow Tigers	8
Bath Killer Bees	8
Tarannau Aberystwyth	20

College Bowl XI
Loughborough Aces	28
Tarannau Aberystwyth	19

- Note – the table does not indicate who played home or away in each fixture.
