= British Universities American Football League =

College American football league in the UK

- Formerly: British Collegiate American Football League (1986–2007)
- Sport: American football
- Founded: 2007
- Commissioner: Tonye Dokubo
- Organising body: British Universities and Colleges Sport
- Divisions: 4 with a total of 15 conferences
- No. of teams: 79 (2024–25 season)
- Country: United Kingdom
- Confederation: British American Football Association
- Most recent champions: Durham Saints (2nd title)
- Most titles: Birmingham Lions (5 titles); Hertfordshire Hurricanes (5 titles); UWE Bullets (5 titles)
- Streaming partner: Sportank
- Website: www.bucs.org.uk/

The British Universities American Football League (BUAFL) is an American football league contested by university teams in the United Kingdom as part of the British Universities and Colleges Sport (BUCS) organisation. The league was formed by the British American Football Association (BAFA), the national governing body of American football in the UK, in 2007 as the successor to the British Collegiate American Football League, after BAFA withdrew its recognition of the British Student American Football Association which ran that league. The BUAFL has been credited with reviving interest in American football in the UK.

From 2008, the BUAFL was officially associated with the National Football League (NFL), through its partner organisation NFL UK. In 2012, BUAFL's league and teams were absorbed into BUCS after American football became an official BUCS sport. Over the period 2007 to 2014, the BUAFL grew from 42 teams and 2,460 participants to 75 teams and over 4,100 people involved. It has remained at a similar size since, with 79 teams from 77 institutions and over 4,000 students involved in the 2024–25 season.

The main league and championship competitions are full-contact, although a flag football series was introduced in the 2025–26 season.

== Teams ==
Locations of BUAFL teams in the UK

List of teams:

- Aberystwyth Tarannau
- Anglia Ruskin Siege
- Bangor Llewod
- Bath Killer Bees
- Bath Spa Bulldogs
- Birmingham Lions
- Bournemouth Bobcats
- Brighton Panthers
- Bristol Barracuda
- Brunel Burgers
- Cambridge Pythons
- Cardiff Cobras
- Chichester Spitfire
- City St George's Wolfpack
- Coventry Jets
- De Montfort Lions
- Derby Braves
- Durham Saints
- East Anglia Pirates
- Edge Hill Vikings
- Edinburgh Napier Knights
- Edinburgh Mavericks
- Essex Blades
- Exeter Demons
- Glasgow Tigers
- Gloucestershire Gladiators
- Greenwich Mariners
- Heriot-Watt Wolverines
- Hertfordshire Hurricanes
- Hull Sharks
- Imperial Immortals
- Keele Crusaders
- Kent Falcons
- King's College Regents
- Kingston Cougars
- Lancashire Rams
- Lancaster Bombers
- Leeds Beckett Carnegie
- Leeds Gryphons
- Leicester Longhorns
- Lincoln Colonials
- Liverpool John Moores Fury
- Liverpool Raptors
- Loughborough Students
- Manchester Met Eagles
- Manchester Tyrants
- Newcastle Raiders
- Northumbria Mustangs
- Nottingham Gold (first team) and Green (second and third teams)
- Nottingham Trent Renegades
- Oxford Brookes University Panthers
- Oxford Lancers
- Plymouth Blitz
- Portsmouth Destroyers
- Queen Mary Vipers
- Reading Knights
- Royal Holloway Bears
- Salford Storm
- SGS Pride
- Sheffield Hallam Warriors
- Sheffield Sabres
- Solent Redhawks
- Southampton Stags
- Staffordshire Stallions
- Stirling Clansmen
- Sunderland Spartans
- Surrey Stingers
- Sussex Saxons
- Swansea Titans
- UCL Emperors
- UWE Bullets (two teams)
- Warwick Wolves
- Worcester Royals
- York Centurions
- York St John Jaguars

== Flag football ==
The Times reported in 2024 that a BUCS flag football competition was planned for the 2025–26 season. This took the form of a regional flag football series, introduced on a trial basis in the 2025–26 season. It was planned to consist of five one-day regional events in April and May, held at the University of Warwick (Midlands), the University of Surrey (South Eastern), SGS College (Western), the University of Lancashire (Northern) and at the University of Stirling (Scottish), with all events having both "open" and "women's" categories. However, the Scottish and Northern events were cancelled due to low entry numbers.

A review of the trial identified that a major delay in finalising venues and dates had resulted in a "poor lead into the events" and that institutions had said that the registration cost for individual players was high, despite the bulk of the costs for the events being met by the NFL. The feedback on the three events that ran was positive, and 22 teams from 18 institutions (20 open, 2 women's) participated. The trial was therefore deemed a success and the flag football series was adopted into the full BUCS programme, with the regional events planned to feed into a national final for which BUCS points would be awarded, contributing to institutions' standing in the overall BUCS table.

== League structure ==
=== Current structure ===
In 2024, BUCS introduced a five-team Premier National division above the Premier North and Premier South. Only the national champions, UWE, were promoted from the Premier South with the other four teams being the four that qualified for the post-season from the Premier North. There was no relegation from either regional premier league after the 2023–24 season. The reorganisation retained six regional Tier 1 divisions and six (different) regional Tier 2 divisions. The Tier 1 divisions for 2024/25 were: Midlands and Yorkshire, Northern, Scottish, South Eastern, South Western, and Southern, and the Tier 2 divisions were Midlands, North Eastern, North Western, South Eastern, South Western, and Southern.

=== Playoffs ===
==== Premier National and Premier North & South ====
Playoffs were also changed for the 2024–25 season. The number of teams and qualification varied between tiers, with qualification being determined by regular season results. In the Premier National Division, the top 4 teams would enter into a seeded playoff for the National Championship. At the Premier North/South level, the top 4 teams from each of the two divisions would qualify for the National Vase. The top two teams within each division would also receive home-field advantages in the playoffs. The winner of the National Vase would play the 5th (last) placed team from Premier National, with the winner playing in Premier National the following season.

==== Tier 1 and 2 playoffs ====
The last placed teams in Premier North and Premier South are automatically relegated to the divisions below. Promotion from Tier 1 divisions was the same for both north and south teams who would compete in the National Trophy (the third level/tier of playoff competition). From each of the three southern and three northern divisions, the top two ranked teams would qualify, with the two best third-placed teams also qualifying. This makes eight teams from the south and eight teams from the north. The winners from the northern and southern halves of the playoff (i.e., both finalists) earn promotion to the corresponding Premier North or South division for the following season, regardless of which of them wins the National Trophy.

Tier 2 has a similar play-off qualification process to Tier 1 with the top two teams from each of the three northern and southern divisions qualifying automatically. The two best third-placed teams also qualify for their respective playoffs. In the south, the eight qualified teams compete for the Southern Conference Cup whilst the teams in the north play for the Northern Conference Cup. At this level there is no competition between conferences. Promotion between Tier 1 and Tier 2 is decided on regular season standings, as the six divisional winners from Tier 2 replace the last placed teams from each of the six Tier 1 divisions.

=== 2024/25 ===
The teams allocated to the premier divisions at the start of the 2024–2025 season were:

==== Premier divisions ====
National
Durham Saints; Leeds Beckett Carnegie; Loughborough Students; Nottingham Gold; UWE Bullets
North	South
Leeds Gryphons; Liverpool Raptors; Newcastle Raiders; NTU Renegades; Warwick Wolves	Birmingham Lions; Cardiff Cobras; Exeter Demons; Portsmouth Destroyers; SGS Pride

==== Tier 1 divisions ====
Scottish	Northern	Midlands and Yorkshire
Aberdeen Bulls; Edinburgh Mavericks; Edinburgh Napier Knights; Glasgow Tigers; Heriot-Watt Wolverines; Stirling Clansmen	Liverpool John Moores Fury; Manchester Tyrants; MMU Eagles; Northumbria Mustangs; Lancashire Rams	Coventry Jets; Hull Sharks; Leicester Longhorns; Nottingham Green; Sheffield Hallam Warriors
Southern	South East	South West
Brighton Panthers; Brunel Burners; Hertfordshire Hurricanes; Oxford Lancers; Reading Knights	Essex Blades; Kent Falcons; King's College Regents; UCL Emperors; UEA Pirates	Bath Killer Bees; Bournemouth Bobcats; Bristol Barracuda; Southampton Stags; Swansea Titans

==== Tier 2 Divisions ====
North Western	North Eastern	Midlands
Edge Hill Vikings; Keele Crusaders; Lancaster Bombers; Staffordshire Stallions	Bradford Bears; Sheffield Sabres; Sunderland Spartans; York Centurions; YSJ Jaguars	ARU Siege; Cambridge Pythons; Derby Braves; DMU Lions; Lincoln Colonials
Southern	South Western	South Eastern
Chichester Spitfires; OBU Panthers; Royal Holloway Bears; Solent Redhawks; Surrey Stingers; Sussex Saxons	Bath Spa Bulldogs; Gloucester Gladiators; Plymouth Blitz; Tarannau Aberystwyth; UWE Bullets 2's; Worcester Royals	Canterbury Chargers; City Wolfpack; Greenwich Mariners; Imperial Immortals; Kingston Cougars; QMUL Vipers

=== 2016–2023 structure ===
A revised structure was announced by BUCS on 26 August 2016. This consisted of two Premier divisions, six regional Tier 1 divisions and six regional Tier 2 divisions. This differed from the standard BUCS structure of five geographical regions below Premier level. The Premier and Tier 1 divisions were considered to be of "high performance" by the BAFA and BUCS. For the 2023–2024 season, the Tier 1 regional divisions were Scottish, Northern, Midlands, Southern, South Western, and South Eastern, while the Tier 2 regional divisions were Northern A, Northern B, Midlands, Southern, South Western, and South Eastern.

Over the course of the regular season, each team in the Premier and Tier 1 played between eight regular season games. Each team played everyone in their division twice; once home and once away. For the 2016/17 season, Tier 2 was broken down into six conferences, five of seven teams and one (South East) of eight; teams in Tier 2 playee a six-game season (seven in the South East division), playing each other only once.

=== Earlier structures ===
The first two full seasons of BUCS American Football preserved the single tier, eight conference structure inherited from BUAFL. In 2014–15, this was changed to a two tier system with the formation of two Premier divisions (North and South), each of five teams. The eight regional conferences, slightly reorganised (in particular, the small Scottish conference became the more balanced Borders conference, including teams from northern England) to contain 8 or 9 teams each, became the second tier. At the same time the Championship was reduced to the top two teams from each Premier division and the Challenge trophy was replaced with cup competitions for North and South Tier 1 divisional winners, with the winners being promoted to the appropriate Premier division.

For the 2015–16 season, the league was split in three tiers. The premier remained organised into North and South, although the top four (of five) in each division now entered the Championship playoff, with the fifth being relegated. The second tier contained 6 geographic division, three Northern (Scottish North, Northern and Midlands) and three Southern (Western, South and Southeastern). The Trophy playoffs took the top two from each division plus the top two remaining teams with the best record from the northern and southern regions, the playoffs were structured with a "northern semi-final" and a "southern semi-final", with the semi-final winners promoted to the respective Premier division regardless of the result in the final. The third tier was organised into 8 divisions, four Northern (Scottish North, Northern, Midlands and North Midlands) and four Southern (Western, South, Southeastern and London). The major change for the 2016–17 season was the reduction to six divisions (and a consequent increase in the number of teams per division) in the third tier (Tier 2), although not fully matching the geographical regions in the second tier (Tier 1).

== League results ==
=== 2024-25 season results ===
All match results and playoff brackets can be found on the BUCS American football website.

Purple indicates playoff qualification.

Premier National
Team	W	L	T	PCT	PF	PA	Pts
UWE Bullets (C)	7	1	0	0.875	466	63	14
Nottingham Gold	6	2	0	0.750	308	90	12
Durham Saints	5	3	0	0.625	222	200	10
Loughborough Students	2	6	0	0.250	113	261	4
Leeds Beckett Carnegie (O)	0	8	0	0.000	39	342	0

C = national champions.

O = promotion playoff winners: SGS Pride won the National Vase but conceded the promotion playoff game, thus Leeds Beckett retained Premier National status.

Premier North
Team	W	L	T	PCT	PF	PA	Pts
Warwick Wolves	7	1	0	0.875	216	80	14
Leeds Gryphons	6	2	0	0.750	284	106	12
NTU Renegades	4	4	0	0.500	171	135	8
Newcastle Raiders	2	6	0	0.250	60	268	4
Liverpool (R)	1	7	0	0.125	47	189	0

Premier South
Team	W	L	T	PCT	PF	PA	Pts
SGS Pride (C)	8	0	0	1.000	241	28	16
Portsmouth Destroyers	5	3	0	0.625	179	126	10
Exeter Demons	4	4	0	0.500	122	204	8
Cardiff Cobras	2	6	0	0.250	134	206	4
Birmingham Open (R)	1	7	0	0.125	89	201	0

C = National Vase champions. R = relegated to tier 1

==== Tier 1 and below ====
===== National Trophy =====
First Round
Home team (Seed)	Score	Away team (Seed)
Southern results:
Bournemouth (1)	17-0	Bath (8)
Brunel (2)	42-0	UEA (7)
KCL (3)	0-20	Bristol (6)
Kent (4)	3-0	Hertfordshire (5)
Northern results:
Edinburgh Napier (1)	27-0	Edinburgh (8)
Northumbria (2)	28-6	Leicester (7)
Nottingham Green (3)	6-23	Sheffield Hallam (6)
UCLAN (4)	10-13	Stirling (5)

Quarter finals
Home team (Seed)	Score	Away team (Seed)
Southern results:
Bournemouth (1)	22-0	Kent (4)
Brunel (2)	58-6	Bristol (6)
Northern results:
Edinburgh Napier (1)	33-14	Sterling (5)
Northumbria (2)	21-15	Sheffield Hallam (6)

Conference finals (i.e. semi-finals) and National Trophy final

Home team (seed)	Score	Away team (seed)	Notes
Bournemouth (1)	6-13	Brunel (2)	Brunel win the Southern conference and are promoted to Premier South
Edinburgh Napier (1)	13-32	Northumbria (2)	Northumbria win the Northern conference and are promoted to Premier North
Brunel (2)	24-12	Northumbria (2)	Brunel win the National Vase

===== Tier 2 - Southern and Northern conference cups =====
Teams
Division	Divisional winners	2nd placed teams	3rd placed teams (wild card)*
Southern tier 2	Oxford Brookes	Sussex	(Did not Qualify)
South West tier 2	Plymouth	UWE 2's	Aberystwyth
South East tier 2	Kingston	Queen Mary	Greenwich
North West tier 2	Edge Hill	Lancaster	(Did not Qualify)
Midlands tier 2	Derby	Lincoln	Cambridge
North East tier 2	Sheffield	York	Sunderland

Only the best two out of three third-placed teams qualify.

Divisional winners promoted to tier 1 for the following season.

Conference cups
Southern			Northern		
Home team	Score	Away team	Home team	Score	Away team
Quarter finals:
Oxford Brookes	W/O	Aberystwyth	Sheffield	21-7	Sunderland
UWE 2's	18-28	Queen Mary	Lancaster	11-21	York
Plymouth	33-0	Greenwich	Derby	W/O	Cambridge
Kingston	9-26	Sussex	Edge Hill	26-13	Lincoln
Semi finals:
Oxford Brookes	42-0	Queen Mary	Sheffield	16-10	York
Plymouth	21-6	Sussex	Derby	40-0	Edge Hill
Final:
Oxford Brookes	20-14	Plymouth	Sheffield	29-6	Derby

=== 2023-24 regular season standings ===
Championship qualification is shaded in green – there was no relegation in this season due to the league reorganisation; position in the Championship bracket is based on final positions in the two divisions. League position is based on number of points scored, with 2 points for a win, 1 point for a tie and 0 points for a loss. Team names shaded in blue indicate promotion to the Premier National.

Premier North
Team	W	L	T	PCT	PF	PA	Pts
Nottingham Gold	8	0	0	1.000	246	54	16
Leeds Beckett Carnegie	5	2	0	0.714	198	43	10
Durham Saints	4	3	0	0.571	133	78	8
Loughborough Students	2	6	0	0.250	94	193	4
Newcastle Raiders	0	8	0	0.000	39	342	0

Premier South
Team	W	L	T	PCT	PF	PA	Pts
UWE Bullets	8	0	0	1.000	486	0	16
SGS Pride	6	2	0	0.750	237	66	10
Birmingham Lions	2	6	0	0.250	68	319	4.2
Portsmouth Destroyers	2	6	0	0.250	73	279	4.1
Cardiff Cobras	2	6	0	0.250	100	300	4

=== 2022-23 regular season standings ===
Championship qualification is shaded in green, and relegation is shaded in red; position in the Championship bracket is based on final positions in the two divisions. League position is based on number of points scored, with 2 points for a win, 1 point for a tie and 0 points for a loss

Premier North
Team	W	L	T	PCT	PF	PA	Pts
Nottingham Gold	7	1	0	0.875	332	57	14
Leeds Beckett Carnegie	7	1	0	0.875	311	50	14
Durham Saints	3	5	0	0.375	83	196	6
Newcastle Raiders	3	5	0	0.375	133	185	6
Stirling Clansmen	0	8	0	0.000	8	379	0

Premier South
Team	W	L	T	PCT	PF	PA	Pts
UWE Bullets	8	0	0	1.000	604	28	16
SGS Pride	6	2	0	0.750	338	106	12
Birmingham Lions	4	4	0	0.500	107	263	8
UEA Pirates	2	6	0	0.250	33	407	4
Cardiff Cobras	0	8	0	0.000	24	302	0

Pirates relegated to South East division after losing in the first round of the playoffs; Cobras remained in Premier South.

=== 2021-22 regular season standings ===
Championship qualification is shaded in green, and relegation is shaded in red; position in the Championship bracket is based on final positions in the two divisions. League position is based on number of points scored, with 2 points for a win, 1 point for a tie and 0 points for a loss

Premier North
Team	W	L	T	PCT	PF	PA	Pts
Nottingham Gold	7	1	0	0.875	309	72	14
Leeds Beckett Carnegie	6	2	0	0.750	239	163	12
Durham Saints	5	3	0	0.625	207	147	10
Stirling Clansmen	2	6	0	0.250	93	239	4
Leeds Gryphons	0	8	0	0.000	10	237	-2

Premier South
Team	W	L	T	PCT	PF	PA	Pts
UWE Bullets	8	0	0	1.000	417	0	16
Birmingham Lions	6	2	0	0.750	204	143	12
Cardiff Cobras	3	5	0	0.375	117	239	6
UEA Pirates	2	6	0	0.250	80	229	4
Swansea Titans	1	7	0	0.125	26	233	0

=== 2019-20 regular season standings ===
The 2019–20 regular season was completed prior to the suspension of university sports due to COVID-19, although only the first-round (quarter final) matches of the post-season were played and thus no overall champion was named.

Championship qualification is shaded in green, and relegation is shaded in red; position in the Championship bracket is based on final positions in the two divisions. League position is based on number of points scored, with 2 points for a win, 1 point for a tie and 0 points for a loss

Premier North
Team	W	L	T	PCT	PF	PA	Pts
Durham Saints	6	2	0	0.750	147	56	12
Stirling Clansmen	6	2	0	0.750	114	90	12
Nottingham Gold	4	4	0	0.500	157	89	8
Leeds Beckett Carnegie	4	4	0	0.500	121	125	8
Coventry Jets	0	8	0	0.000	6	185	0

Premier South
Team	W	L	T	PCT	PF	PA	Pts
UWE Bullets	7	1	0	0.875	306	50	14
Birmingham Lions	7	1	0	0.875	234	66	14
Swansea Titans	2	5	1	0.250	90	205	5
UEA Pirates	2	6	0	0.250	52	207	4
Hertfordshire Hurricanes	1	6	1	0.125	64	218	3

=== 2018-19 regular season standings ===
Championship qualification is shaded in green, and relegation is shaded in red; position in the Championship bracket is based on final positions in the two divisions. League position is based on number of points scored, with 2 points for a win, 1 point for a tie and 0 points for a loss

Premier North
Team	W	L	T	PCT	PF	PA	Pts
Nottingham Gold	8	0	0	1.000	204	42	16
Leeds Beckett Carnegie	5	3	0	0.625	194	130	10
Durham Saints	4	4	0	0.500	152	113	8
Stirling Clansmen	3	5	0	0.375	138	159	6
Derby Braves	0	8	0	0.000	33	277	0

Premier South
Team	W	L	T	PCT	PF	PA	Pts
UWE Bullets	6	2	0	0.750	212	134	12
Swansea Titans	5	3	0	0.625	174	119	10
Birmingham Lions	5	3	0	0.625	198	190	10
Hertfordshire Hurricanes	3	4	0	0.429	155	144	6
Portsmouth Destroyers	0	7	0	0.000	46	198	0

=== 2017–18 final standings ===
Championship qualification is shaded in green, and relegation is shaded in red; position in the Championship bracket is based on final positions in the two divisions. League position is based on number of points scored, with 2 points for a win, 1 point for a tie and 0 points for a loss

Premier North
Team	W	L	T	PCT	PF	PA	Pts
Durham Saints	7	0	0	1.000	190	63	14
Stirling Clansmen	4	3	0	0.571	174	117	8
Leeds Beckett	4	4	0	0.500	124	164	8
Derby Braves	3	5	0	0.375	167	140	6
Loughborough Students	1	7	0	0.125	46	217	2

Premier South
Team	W	L	T	PCT	PF	PA	Pts
Birmingham Lions	7	1	0	0.875	276	156	14
Hertfordshire Hurricanes	6	2	0	0.750	205	133	12
Swansea Titans	3	3	0	0.500	180	121	16
Portsmouth Destroyers	2	4	0	0.333	104	133	4
Bath Killer Bees	0	8	0	0.000	68	290	0

=== 2016–17 final standings ===
Championship qualification is shaded in green, and relegation is shaded in red; position in the Championship bracket is based on final positions in the two divisions. League position is based on number of points scored, with 2 points for a win, 1 point for a tie and 0 points for a loss

Premier North
Team	W	L	T	PCT	PF	PA	Pts
Stirling Clansmen	6	2	0	0.750	204	122	12
Loughborough Students	6	2	0	0.750	95	86	12
Derby Braves	4	4	0	0.500	142	180	8
Durham Saints	3	5	0	0.375	88	38	6
Nottingham Trent Renegades	1	7	0	0.125	74	167	2

Premier South
Team	W	L	T	PCT	PF	PA	Pts
Hertfordshire Hurricanes	7	1	0	0.875	206	91	14
Birmingham Lions	5	3	0	0.625	175	114	10
Swansea Titans	5	3	0	0.625	159	138	10
Bath Killer Bees	2	6	0	0.375	83	135	4
Kingston Cougars	1	7	0	0.125	90	149	2

=== 2015–16 final standings ===
Championship qualification is shaded in green, and relegation is shaded in red; position in the Championship bracket is based on final positions in the two divisions. League position is based on number of points scored, with 2 points for a win, 1 point for a tie and 0 points for a loss

Premier North
Team	W	L	T	PCT	PF	PA	Pts
Stirling Clansmen	8	0	0	1.000	268	88	16
Durham Saints	5	2	0	0.714	189	132	10
Derby Braves	4	4	0	0.500	144	163	8
Loughborough Students	2	6	0	0.250	104	160	10
Hallam Warriors	0	7	0	0.000	62	224	0

Premier South
Team	W	L	T	PCT	PF	PA	Pts
Birmingham Lions	8	0	0	1.000	232	45	16
Hertfordshire Hurricanes	5	3	0	0.625	190	109	10
Kingston Cougars	4	4	0	0.500	102	134	8
Bath Killer Bees	3	5	0	0.375	143	163	6
Imperial Immortals	0	8	0	0.000	46	262	0

=== 2014–15 final standings ===
Championship qualification is shaded in green, and relegation is shaded in red; position in the Championship bracket is based on final positions in the two divisions. League position is based on number of points scored, with 2 points for a win, 1 point for a tie and 0 points for a loss

Premier North
Team	W	L	T	PCT	PF	PA	Pts
Durham Saints	7	1	0	0.875	233	119	14
Stirling Clansmen	6	2	0	0.750	271	68	12
Loughborough Students	5	3	0	0.625	178	150	10
Derby Braves	1	7	0	0.125	68	211	2
Sheffield Sabres	1	7	0	0.125	60	262	0

Premier South
Team	W	L	T	PCT	PF	PA	Pts
Birmingham Lions	7	1	0	0.875	259	30	14
Hertfordshire Hurricanes	7	1	0	0.875	275	56	14
Bath Killer Bees	4	4	0	0.500	140	170	8
Imperial Immortals	2	6	0	0.250	50	133	2
Brighton Tsunami	0	8	0	0.000	15	350	0

=== 2013–14 final standings ===
Championship qualification is shaded in green, and trophy qualification is shaded in orange. Seeding is based on number of points scored, with 2 points for a win, 1 point for a tie and 0 points for a loss

Saltire (Scottish)
Team	W	L	T	PCT	PF	PA	Pts
Stirling Clansmen	8	0	0	1.000	622	13	16
Glasgow Tigers	5	3	0	0.625	176	264	10
Edinburgh Predators	4	4	0	0.500	130	201	8
Edinburgh Napier Knights	3	5	0	0.375	125	244	6
UWS Pyros	0	8	0	0.000	42	373	0
Big North Western (BNWC)
Team	W	L	T	PCT	PF	PA	Pts
Sheffield Sabres	7	1	0	0.875	197	61	14
Derby Braves	7	1	0	0.875	320	42	14
Hallam Warriors	7	1	0	0.875	274	96	14
LJMU Fury	6	2	0	0.750	246	129	12
UCLan Rams	5	3	0	0.625	254	90	10
Bangor MudDogs	3	5	0	0.375	140	208	6
MMU Eagles	3	5	0	0.375	121	193	6
Lancaster Bombers	3	5	0	0.375	174	294	6
Staffordshire Stallions	2	6	0	0.250	140	229	4
Manchester Tyrants	0	7	0	0.000	61	200	0
Keele Crusaders	0	7	0	0.000	6	386	0
North Eastern (NEC)
Team	W	L	T	PCT	PF	PA	Pts
Durham Saints	7	0	0	1.000	316	41	14
Sunderland Spartans	7	1	0	.875	229	115	14
Leeds Carnegie	6	2	0	.750	135	59	12
Hull Sharks	6	2	0	.750	155	87	12
Newcastle Raiders	5	3	0	.625	140	134	10
York Centurions	4	4	0	.500	140	215	8
Northumbria Mustangs	3	5	0	.375	104	114	6
Huddersfield Hawks	2	5	0	.286	146	144	4
Leeds Celtics	2	6	0	.250	100	162	4
Bradford Bears	1	7	0	.125	42	187	2
Teesside Cougars	0	8	0	.000	69	312	0
Midlands Athletics (MAC)
Team	W	L	T	PCT	PF	PA	Pts
Birmingham Lions	8	0	0	1.000	206	21	16
Loughborough Students	7	1	0	.875	340	76	14
NTU Renegades	6	2	0	.750	214	117	12
Nottingham	4	4	0	.500	122	99	8
Warwick Wolves	4	4	0	.500	193	145	8
Coventry Jets	3	4	0	.429	149	190	6
DMU Falcons	3	5	0	.375	87	176	6
Worcester Royals	3	5	0	.375	77	213	6
Lincoln Colonials	3	4	0	.429	52	113	6
Wolverhampton Wildcats	1	6	0	.143	58	153	2

South Western Athletics (SWAC)
Team	W	L	T	PCT	PF	PA	Pts
Bath Killer Bees	7	0	0	1.000	253	47	14
UWE Bullets	6	1	0	.857	211	65	12
Swansea Titans	6	1	0	.857	288	88	12
Exeter Demons	4	3	0	.571	198	175	8
Gloucester Gladiators	3	4	0	.429	63	97	6
Cardiff Cobras	2	3	0	.400	81	86	4
Plymouth Blitz	1	3	0	.250	56	141	2
Tarannau Aberystwyth	1	5	0	.166	88	127	2
Bristol Barracuda	1	6	0	.143	89	210	2
Bath Spa Bulldogs	0	5	0	.000	13	322	0
Oyster Card (London)
Team	W	L	T	PCT	PF	PA	Pts
Imperial Immortals	8	0	0	1.000	145	36	16
Kingston Cougars	7	1	0	.875	186	21	14
Royal Holloway Bears	6	2	0	.750	228	82	12
Brunel Burners	5	3	0	.625	224	80	10
King's College Regents	4	4	0	.500	87	141	8
Greenwich Mariners	3	5	0	.375	97	172	6
Westminster Dragons	1	6	0	.143	60	142	2
London City Sentinels	0	8	0	.000	24	320	0
LSBU Spartans	1	6	0	.143	38	106	−2**
South Coast (SCC)
Team	W	L	T	PCT	PF	PA	Pts
Brighton Tsunami	8	0	0	1.000	236	40	16
Southampton Stags	7	1	0	.875	236	48	14
Portsmouth Destroyers	6	2	0	.750	197	47	12
Surrey Stingers	5	3	0	.625	82	106	10
OBU Panthers	4	4	0	.500	96	103	8
Reading Knights	2	5	0	.286	86	155	4
Solent Redhawks	2	6	0	.250	209	217	4
Sussex Saxons	1	6	0	.143	102	218	2
Oxford Lancers	0	8	0	.000	31	294	0
South Central (SCC)
Team	W	L	T	PCT	PF	PA	Pts
Hertfordshire Hurricanes	8	0	0	1.000	384	6	16
Cambridge Pythons	7	1	0	.875	243	67	14
Kent Falcons	5	2	0	.714	122	65	10
UEA Pirates	5	3	0	.625	142	65	10
Northampton Nemesis	4	3	0	.571	129	158	8
BNU Buccaneers	3	5	0	.375	67	143	6
Canterbury Chargers	1	6	0	.143	46	180	2
Anglia Ruskin Rhinos	1	7	0	.125	42	224	2
Essex Blades	0	7	0	.000	13	270	0

=== 2012–13 final standings ===
Championship qualification is shaded in green, and trophy qualification is shaded in orange. Seeding is based on number of points scored, with 1 point for a win, 0 points for a tie and 0 points for a loss

Saltire (Scottish)
Team	W	L	T	PCT	PF	PA	Pts
Stirling Clansmen	8	0	0	1.000			8
Glasgow Tigers	6	2	0	0.750			6
Edinburgh Predators	2	4	0	0.333			2
UWS Pyros	2	5	0	0.286			2
Edinburgh Napier Knights	0	7	0	0.000			0
Big North Western (BNWC)
Team	W	L	T	PCT	PF	PA	Pts
Derby Braves	8	0	0	1.000			8
Sheffield Sabres	7	1	0	0.875			7
Manchester Tyrants	6	2	0	0.750			6
UCLan Rams	5	3	0	0.625			5
Hallam Warriors	3	3	0	0.500			3
Staffordshire Stallions	2	5	0	0.286			2
LJMU Fury	2	4	0	0.250			2
Lancaster Bombers	2	5	0	0.285			2
Huddersfield Hawks	2	6	0	0.250			2
MMU Eagles	2	6	0	0.250			2
Bangor MudDogs	1	5	0	0.167			1
North Eastern (NEC)
Team	W	L	T	PCT	PF	PA	Pts
Hull Sharks	7	0	0	1.000			7
Leeds Carnegie	6	2	0	0.750			6
Newcastle Raiders	5	3	0	0.625			5
Bradford Bears	4	4	0	0.500			4
Leeds Celtics	4	3	0	0.571			4
Sunderland Spartans	3	4	0	0.429			3
Northumbria Mustangs	2	5	0	0.286	104	114	2
Durham Saints	2	3	0	0.400			2
Teesside Cougars	1	6	0	0.143			1
York Centurions	1	5	0	0.167			1
Midlands Athletics (MAC)
Team	W	L	T	PCT	PF	PA	Pts
Birmingham Lions	8	0	0	1.000			8
Loughborough Students	7	1	0	0.875			7
NTU Renegades	6	2	0	0.750			6
Warwick Wolves	6	1	0	0.857			6
Coventry Jets	3	3	0	0.500			3
Northampton Nemesis	3	4	0	0.429			3
Nottingham	2	5	0	0.286			2
Leicester	2	5	0	0.286			2
Lincoln Colonials	1	7	0	0.125			1
DMU Falcons	1	6	0	0.143			1
Wolverhampton Wildcats	0	5	0	0.000			0

Western
Team	W	L	T	PCT	PF	PA	Pts
Bath Killer Bees	8	0	0	1.000			8
Gloucester Gladiators	6	2	0	0.750			6
UWE Bullets	6	1	0	0.857			6
Swansea Titans	5	3	0	0.625			5
Plymouth Blitz	4	3	0	0.571			4
Exeter Demons	3	5	0	0.375			3
Tarannau Aberystwyth	3	3	0	0.500			3
Bristol Barracuda	2	5	0	0.286			2
Cardiff Cobras	1	4	0	0.200			1
Bath Spa Bulldogs	0	6	0	0.000			0
Worcester Royals	0	5	0	0.000			0
South Eastern A
Team	W	L	T	PCT	PF	PA	Pts
Hertfordshire Hurricanes	8	0	0	1.000			8
Cambridge Pythons	5	1	0	0.833			5
UEA Pirates	4	2	0	0.667			4
Kent Falcons	3	1	0	0.750			3
Essex Blades	3	2	0	0.600			3
Imperial Immortals	3	2	0	0.600			3
Westminster Dragons	2	3	0	0.400			2
Canterbury Chargers	2	4	0	0.333			2
Anglia Ruskin Rhinos	1	4	0	0.200			1
Greenwich Mariners	1	6	0	0.143			1
King's College Regents	0	4	0	0.000			0
LSBU Spartans	0	3	0	0.000			0
South Eastern B
Team	W	L	T	PCT	PF	PA	Pts
Portsmouth Destroyers	7	1	0	0.875			7
Kingston Cougars	7	1	0	0.875			7
Southampton Stags	6	2	0	0.750			6
Brighton Tsunami	5	3	0	0.625			5
BNU Buccaneers	4	2	0	0.667			4
Brunel Burners	4	3	0	0.571			4
Solent Redhawks	3	5	0	0.375			3
Reading Knights	3	3	0	0.500			3
OBU Panthers	2	5	0	0.286			2
Surrey Stingers	2	5	0	0.286			2
Royal Holloway Bears	0	7	0	0.000			0
Oxford Lancers	0	6	0	0.000			0

== National Championship ==
The National Championship game is the annual climax of the British Universities American Football League (BUAFL), crowning the definitive champion of the UK university game. This final game concludes the National Championship playoffs, ending a season that begins in the previous calendar year.

The winning team receives the National Championship Trophy, an honor that has been contested in numerous host cities across Britain.

Since the 2024/25 season, the playoff format has focused on the top four teams of the National Conference regular season.

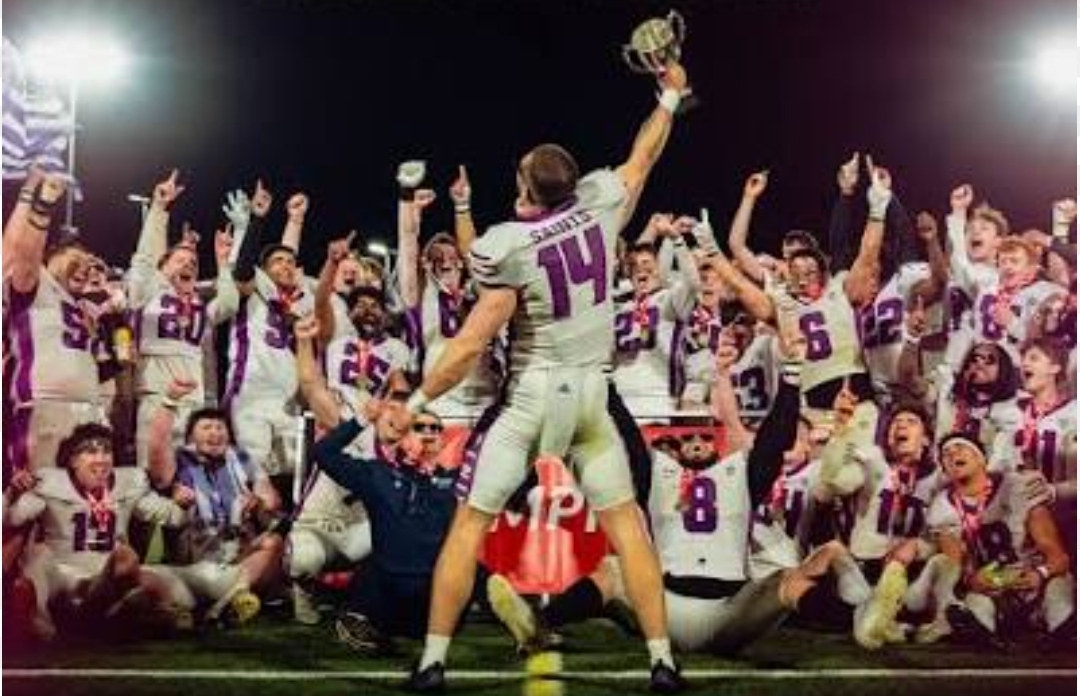
2026 National Champions: Durham Saints (Unibowl XXXVIII)

Since the collapse of the BCAFL (British Collegiate American Football League) at the end of the 2006–07 season, the event’s identity evolved when the newly–formed BUAFL rebranded the original "College Bowl" as the "National Championship." Despite this renaming of the official title, "Unibowl" remains a popular, unofficial moniker used by players, coaches, and fans as shorthand for the competition, often used retrospectively as a collective label for all titles won since 1987, honoring the twenty-one original College Bowl victories as the foundational history of the sport in the United Kingdom.

The competition's history is marked by several notable milestones, including the "Mud Bowl," the only time a championship game ended with co-champions. In that game, the Hull Sharks and Cardiff Cobras played to a 0–0 tie in College Bowl II after heavy rain made the surface extremely difficult to play on. In terms of dominance, the Birmingham Lions hold the record for the most consecutive championship appearances with six (2009–2014), while the UWE Bullets hold the record for most consecutive wins with four (2022–2025). As of 2026, the Hertfordshire Hurricanes, Birmingham Lions, and UWE Bullets share the all-time lead for national titles, each having won five.

The Stirling Clansmen hold the title of the most successful Scottish team, with four National Titles from five Unibowl appearances.

Key
*	Game went to overtime.
†	Game tied after 3 periods of overtime. Championship shared.
‡	Four 'charter' Universities competed in a single Conference, no postseason playoffs. Conference Champions crowned first National Champions.
(1, 1–0)	Number of times that team has appeared in a National Championship as well as each respective teams' National Championship record to date.

National Championship / 'Unibowl'
Game	Date (Season)	Winning team	Score	Runner-up	Venue	Host City	Referee	Elig. teams	Refh
	(1985–86)	Hull Sharks‡ (1, 1–0)						4	
BCAFL College Bowl (1987–2007)
I	March 15, 1987 (1986–87)	Hull Sharks (2, 2–0)	23–6	Newcastle Scholars (1, 0–1)	Teesside Playing Fields	Middlesbrough, Yorkshire		8	
II	March 13, 1988 (1987–88)	Hull Sharks (3, 3–0)	0–0†	Cardiff Cobras (1, 1–0)	Allam Sports Pitches	Hull, Yorkshire		11	
III	(1988–89)	Hull Sharks (4, 4–0)	7–6	Cardiff Cobras (2, 1–1)	Saffron Lane Sports Centre	Leicester, Leicestershire		11	
IV	(1989–90)	Teesside Demons (1, 1–0)	21–20	Birmingham Lions (1, 0–1)	Saffron Lane Sports Centre	Leicester, Leicestershire		16	
V	March 17, 1991 (1990–91)	Teesside Demons (2, 2–0)	19–0	UEA Pirates (1, 0–1)	Saffron Lane Sports Centre	Leicester, Leicestershire		19	
VI	March 8, 1992 (1991–92)	Southampton Stags (1, 1–0)	53–0	Glasgow Tigers (1, 0–1)	Saffron Lane Sports Centre	Leicester, Leicestershire		20	
VII	March 21, 1993 (1992–93)	Southampton Stags (2, 2–0)	19–0	Leeds Celtics (1, 0–1)	Saffron Lane Sports Centre	Leicester, Leicestershire		26	
VIII	March 13, 1994 (1993–94)	Glasgow Tigers (2, 1–1)	26–0	Leicester Lemmings (1, 0–1)	Saffron Lane Sports Centre	Leicester, Leicestershire		26	
IX	March 12, 1995 (1994–95)	Loughborough Aces (1, 1–0)	23–20	Cambridge Pythons (1, 0–1)	Saffron Lane Sports Centre	Leicester, Leicestershire		29	
X	March 17, 1996 (1995–96)	Leeds Celtics (1, 1–0)	14–8	Cardiff Cobras (3, 1–2)	Saffron Lane Sports Centre	Leicester, Leicestershire		27	
XI	(1996–97)	Loughborough Aces (2, 2–0)	28–19	Tarannau Aberystwyth (1, 0–1)	Saffron Lane Sports Centre	Leicester, Leicestershire		31	
XII	March 15, 1998 (1997–98)	Hertfordshire Hurricanes (1, 1–0)	16–7	Leeds Celtics (2, 1–1)	Saffron Lane Sports Centre	Leicester, Leicestershire		27	
XIII	March 21, 1999 (1998–99)	Hertfordshire Hurricanes (2, 2–0)	7–3	Loughborough Aces (3, 2–1)	Saffron Lane Sports Centre	Leicester, Leicestershire		27	
XIV	March 26, 2000 (1999–00)	Hertfordshire Hurricanes (3, 3–0)	20–6	Leicester Lemmings (2, 0–2)	Saffron Lane Sports Centre	Leicester, Leicestershire		27	
XV	March 25, 2001 (2000–01)	Oxford Cavaliers (1, 1–0)	26–23	Loughborough Aces (4, 2–2)	Saffron Lane Sports Centre	Leicester, Leicestershire		27	
XVI	March 17, 2002 (2001–02)	Loughborough Aces (5, 3–2)	39–23	Oxford Cavaliers (2, 1–1)	Saffron Lane Sports Centre	Leicester, Leicestershire		29	
XVII	March 30, 2003 (2002–03)	Stirling Clansmen (1, 1–0)	22–17	Hertfordshire Hurricanes (4, 3–1)	Crown Flatt Stadium	Dewsbury, Yorkshire		29	
XVIII	March 21, 2004 (2003–04)	Hertfordshire Hurricanes (5, 4–1)	27–6	Staffordshire Stallions (1, 0–1)	Crown Flatt Stadium	Dewsbury, Yorkshire		32	
XIX	March 20, 2005 (2004–05)	Birmingham Lions (2, 1–1)	34–7	Glasgow Tigers (3, 1–2)	Butts Park Arena	Coventry, Warwickshire		36	
XX	March 26, 2006 (2005–06)	Southampton Stags (3, 3–0)	79–8	Teesside Cougars (3, 2–1)	Butts Park Arena	Coventry, Warwickshire		37	
XXI	March 25, 2007 (2006–07)	UWE Bullets (1, 1–0)	31–14	Loughborough Aces (6, 3–3)	Butts Park Arena	Coventry, Warwickshire		39	
BUAFL National Championship (2008–Present)
XXII	March 22, 2008 (2007–08)	Southampton Stags (4, 4–0)	54–20	Staffordshire Stallions (2, 0–2)	Keepmoat Stadium	Doncaster, Yorkshire			
XXIII	April 5, 2009 (2008–09)	Birmingham Lions (3, 2–1)	42–2	Newcastle Raiders (2, 0–2)	John Charles Centre	Leeds, Yorkshire			
XXIV	May 9, 2010 (2009–10)	Birmingham Lions (4, 3–1)	27–16	Loughborough Aces (7, 3–4)	Sixfields Stadium	Northampton, Northamptonshire			
XXV	April 9, 2011 (2010–11)	Portsmouth Destroyers (1, 1–0)	20–19	Birmingham Lions (5, 3–2)	John Charles Centre	Leeds, Yorkshire			
XXVI	March 25, 2012 (2011–12)	Hertfordshire Hurricanes (6, 5–1)	37–19	Birmingham Lions (6, 3–3)	John Charles Centre	Leeds, Yorkshire			
XXVII	April 20, 2013 (2012–13)	Birmingham Lions (7, 4–3)	17–13	Hertfordshire Hurricanes (7, 5–2)	John Charles Centre	Leeds, Yorkshire			
XXVIII	March 29, 2014 (2013–14)	Stirling Clansmen (2, 2–0)	20–15	Birmingham Lions (8, 4–4)	John Charles Centre	Leeds, Yorkshire			
XXIV	March 21, 2015 (2014–15)	Stirling Clansmen (3, 3–0)	46–6	Hertfordshire Hurricanes (8, 5–3)	Allianz Park	London (Hendon)		10	
XXX	March 20, 2016 (2015–16)	Birmingham Lions (9, 5–4)	19–13	Stirling Clansmen (4, 3–1)	John Charles Centre	Leeds, Yorkshire		10	
XXXI	March 26, 2017 (2016–17)	Stirling Clansmen (5, 4–1)	10–7	Durham Saints (1, 0–1)	Sixways Stadium	Worcester, Worcestershire		10	
XXXII	March 25, 2018 (2017–18)	Durham Saints (2, 1–1)	17–6	Derby Braves (1, 0–1)	Sixways Stadium	Worcester, Worcestershire		10	
XXXIII	March 31, 2019 (2018–19)	Leeds Beckett Carnegie (1, 1–0)	57–13	Hertfordshire Hurricanes (9, 5–4)	Rugby Rubber Crumb	Loughborough, Leicestershire	Brian Yates	10	
	(2019–20)	cancelled due to the covid–19 pandemic							
	(2020–21)	cancelled due to the covid–19 pandemic							
XXXIV	March 22, 2022 (2021–22)	UWE Bullets (2, 2–0)	28–21	Nottingham Gold (1, 0–1)	David Ross Sports Village	Nottingham, Nottinghamshire		10	
XXXV	March 23, 2023 (2022–23)	UWE Bullets (3, 3–0)	34–27	Nottingham Gold (2, 0–2)	David Ross Sports Village	Nottingham, Nottinghamshire		10	
XXXVI	March 19, 2024 (2023–24)	UWE Bullets (4, 4–0)	52–0	Durham Saints (3, 1–2)	Rugby Rubber Crumb	Loughborough, Leicestershire		10	
XXXVII	March 18, 2025 (2024–25)	UWE Bullets (5, 5–0)	42–12	Nottingham Gold (3, 0–3)	Rugby Rubber Crumb	Loughborough, Leicestershire		5	
XXXVIII	March 24, 2026 (2025–26)	Durham Saints (4, 2–2)	14–6	UWE Bullets (6, 5–1)	Rugby Rubber Crumb	Loughborough, Leicestershire	Brian Yates	5	

Unibowl Appearances
Team	Champions	Runners-up
Birmingham Lions	5 (2004–05, 2008–09, 2009–10, 2012–13, 2015–16)	4 (1989–90, 2010–11, 2011–12, 2013–14)
Hertfordshire Hurricanes	5 (1997–98, 1998–99, 1999–00, 2003–04, 2011–12)	4 (2002–03, 2012–13, 2014–15, 2018–19)
UWE Bullets	5 (2006–07, 2021–22, 2022–23, 2023–24, 2024–25)	1 (2025–26)
Stirling Clansmen	4 (2002–03, 2013–14, 2014–15, 2016–17)	1 (2015–16)
Southampton Stags	4 (1991–92, 1992–93, 2005–06, 2007–08)	
Hull Sharks	4 (1985–86, 1986–87, 1987–88†, 1988–89)	
Loughborough Students fmr. Loughborough Aces	3 (1994–95, 1996–97, 2001–02)	3 (1998–99, 2000–01, 2006–07)
Durham Saints	2 (2017–18, 2025–26)	2 (2016–17, 2023–24)
Teesside Cougars fmr. Teesside Demons	2 (1989–90, 1990–91)	2 (1985–86, 2005–06)
Leeds Gryphons fmr. Leeds Celtics	1 (1995–96)	2 (1992–93, 1997–98)
Glasgow Tigers	1 (1993–94)	2 (1991–92, 2004–05)
Cardiff Cobras	1 (1987–88†)	2 (1988–89, 1995–96)
Oxford Lancers fmr. Oxford Cavaliers	1 (2000–01)	1 (2001–02)
Portsmouth Destroyers	1 (2010–11)	
Leeds Beckett Carnegie	1 (2018–19)	
Nottingham Gold fmr. Nottingham Outlaws		3 (2021–22, 2022–23, 2024–25)
Leicester Longhorns fmr. Leicester Lemmings/ Lightning		2 (1993–94, 1999–00)
Staffordshire Stallions		2 (2003–04, 2007–08)
Tarannau Aberystwyth		1 (1996–97)
Cambridge Pythons		1 (1994–95)
Derby Braves		1 (2017–18)
UEA Pirates		1 (1990–91)

== Challenge trophy, divisional cups, and national trophy ==
The challenge trophy was replaced by the two divisional cups for the transitional 2014–15 season, which were replaced in turn by the national trophy from the 2015–16 season.

Trophy games
Season	Winning team		Losing team		Notes
2008–2009	Bath Killer Bees	13	Sheffield Hallam Warriors	8	
2009–2010	Greenwich Mariners	12	Stirling Clansmen	0	
2010–2011	Cardiff Cobras	20	UCH Sharks	0	
2011–2012	Sheffield Sabres	25	Bath Killer Bees	8	
2012–2013	NTU Renegades	42	Southampton Stags	28	MVP: NTU QB Danny Miller
2013–2014	Swansea Titans	38	Royal Holloway Bears	12	MVP: ST QB Simon George
2014–2015 (North)	Sheffield Hallam Warriors	26	Glasgow Tigers	6	Sheffield Hallam promoted to Premier North
2014–2015 (South)	Kingston Cougars	42	Surrey Stingers	9	Kingston promoted to Premier South
2015–2016	Swansea Titans	21	NTU Renegades	16	Swansea promoted to Premier South, NTU promoted to Premier North
2016–2017	Leeds Beckett Carnegie	28	Portsmouth Destroyers	7	MVP: LBC QB Chris Winrow, Carnegie promoted to Premier North, Portsmouth promoted to Premier South
2017–2018	Nottingham	43	UWE Bullets	0	Nottingham promoted to Premier North, UWE promoted to Premier South
2018–2019	Coventry Jets	26	UEA Pirates	0	Coventry promoted to Premier North, UEA Promoted to Premier South
2021–2022	SGS Pride	21	Newcastle Raiders	8	Newcastle promoted to Premier North, SGS Promoted to Premier South
2022–2023	Loughborough Students	29	Portsmouth Destroyers	0	Loughborough promoted to Premier North, Portsmouth Promoted to Premier South
2023–2024	Exeter Demons	37	NTU Renegades	26	NTU promoted to Premier North (among with others under league reorganisation), Exeter promoted to Premier South

== Varsity Bowl ==
The Varsity Bowl is the annual game between the Oxford Lancers and the Cambridge Pythons, a significant fixture in the UK university sports calendar, pitting the two historic rivals against each other for bragging rights in the sport, played typically in Trinity Term (spring).

It's a continuation of the tradition of varsity contests between Oxford and Cambridge, similar to their famous Boat Race.

The first 5 Varsity Bowls were held between the Oxford Cavaliers and the Cambridge Pythons.

There were no Varsity Bowls held between 1996-2010 because the Oxford Cavaliers became a mixed Oxford University/Oxford Brookes team and they would not have followed Oxbridge Varsity rules.

Since the re-founding of American football at Oxford University, the Varsity Bowl now exists as a contest between the Oxford Lancers and the Cambridge Pythons, recommencing in 2012.

At Varsity Bowl VI, the game was tied and both teams declared co-champions after 3OT.

At Varsity Bowl XI, the game was eventually won by the Cambridge Pythons and declared champions after 2OT.

* Varsity Bowl Champions in bold

Varsity Bowl championships
Ed.	Year	Home team	Score	Away team	MVP
I	1991	PYTHONS	6-40	**CAVALIERS**	
II	1992	**CAVALIERS**	35–6	PYTHONS	
III	1993	CAVALIERS	0-28	**PYTHONS**	
IV	1994	**CAVALIERS**	20–8	PYTHONS	
V	1995	PYTHONS	7-33	**CAVALIERS**	
	Varsity Bowl suspended between 1996-2010 (Oxbridge Varsity rules)				
VI	2012	**PYTHONS**	14-14	**LANCERS**	
VII	2013	LANCERS	13–20	**PYTHONS**	
VIII	2014	**PYTHONS**	33-6	LANCERS	
IX	2015	**PYTHONS**	16-0	LANCERS	
X	2016	**LANCERS**	49–0	PYTHONS	
XI	2017	**PYTHONS**	20-14	LANCERS	Ned Bransden #55 (Cambridge)
XII	2018	**LANCERS**	48–6	PYTHONS	Connor Thompson #5 (Oxford)
XIII	2019	PYTHONS	9-19	**LANCERS**	Will Szymanski #12 (Oxford)
	Varsity Bowl XIV postponed in 2020 due to the covid–19 pandemic				
XIV	2021	**LANCERS**	36–0	PYTHONS	Will Szymanski #12 (Oxford)
XV	2022	**PYTHONS**	14-12	LANCERS	
XVI	2023	**LANCERS**	41–7	PYTHONS	
XVII	2024	PYTHONS	3-48	**LANCERS**	Joel Chesters #9 (Oxford)
XVIII	2025	**LANCERS**	48–0	PYTHONS	

== Cavalier Cup ==
The Cavalier Cup is the trophy awarded to the winner of the American Football fixtures between teams of the University of Oxford and the Oxford Brookes University in the BUAFL, played annually.

The match serves as a high-stakes showdown between the Oxford Lancers and the Oxford Brookes Panthers, two teams that share a single lineage. Until 2011, they competed as a unified program known as the Oxford Cavaliers. This original squad reached the pinnacle of the sport during the 2001–02 season, when they successfully captured the National Championship, establishing a legacy of excellence that both modern teams still strive to uphold.

Since their split in 2011, the Lancers and Panthers have met on the field every year starting in the 2012/13 season. This annual tradition was established not just for competition, but as a formal way to honor the history of the Oxford Cavaliers. By facing off in the Cavalier Cup, both universities keep the memory of their shared championship roots alive for new generations of players and fans.

The Cavalier Cup is fought whenever the two teams play and is sometimes played twice in a season if both teams are playing in same BUAFL conference.

Cavalier Cup championships
Ed.	Season	Winning team	Score	Runner-up
I	2012–13	PANTHERS	41-0	LANCERS
II	2013–14	PANTHERS	16-0	LANCERS
III	2014–15	LANCERS	13-5	PANTHERS
IV	2015–16	LANCERS	13-12	PANTHERS
V	2015–16	LANCERS	23-0	PANTHERS
	Cavalier Cup in 2016-17 season played as a scrimmage (non-Cup Game)			
VI	2017–18	PANTHERS	27-7	LANCERS
VII	2018–19	LANCERS	48-0	PANTHERS
VIII	2019–20	PANTHERS	14-12	LANCERS
	Cavalier Cup IX postponed in 2019–20 season due to the covid–19 pandemic			

RESULTS MISSING UP TO...

25/26 Lancers 7 - 36 Panthers

== Most valuable player awards ==
Most valuable player (MVP) awards have been given out sporadically at best. There has been no central committee to give MVP awards since at least the 2015–2016 season.

Season	League MVP	Offensive MVP	Defensive MVP
2008–2009		Tristan Varney (Birmingham Lions)	Ed Butcher (Southampton Stags)
2009–2010	David Saul (Sheffield Hallam Warriors)	Tristan Varney (Birmingham Lions)	Ed Butcher (Solent Redhawks)
2010–2011		Adam Hope (Loughborough Aces)	Russ Waddell (Bristol Barracuda)
2011–2012	Joe Thompson (Hertfordshire Hurricanes)		
2012–2013	Dan Conroy (Birmingham Lions)		
