= 2002–03 British Collegiate American Football League =

The 2002–03 British Collegiate American Football League season was the 18th full season of the BCAFL, organised by the British Students American Football Association (BSAFA, now the BAFA).

== Changes from last season ==
Divisional Changes

- Northern Conference, Scottish Division was renamed Borders Division

Team Changes

- David Chorley Bullets changed their name back to Bristol Bullets
- Hull Sharks changed their name to UCH Sharks
- Kent Falcons changed their name to UKC Falcons
- Lancaster Bombers moved within the Northern Conference from Borders to Eastern Division
- Leicester Lemmings changed their name to Lightning
- Newcastle Mariners changed their name to Newcastle Raiders, and moved within the Northern Conference from Eastern to Borders Division
- Strathclyde Hawks withdrew after sixteen seasons
- University of Sunderland rejoined the Northern Conference after three seasons away, as the Kings
- Teesside Cougars changed their name to UT Cougars

This meant the number of teams in BCAFL stayed at 29.

== Regular season ==
Locations of Scottish teams in BCAFL 2002–03
Locations of English and Welsh teams in BCAFL 2002–03

=== Northern Conference, Borders Division ===
| Team | Pld | Won | Lst | Drw | PF | PA | Win% | |
|---|---|---|---|---|---|---|---|---|
| Stirling Clansmen | 8 | 8 | 0 | 0 | 262 | 82 | 1.000 | Qualified for Playoffs |
| Newcastle Raiders | 8 | 5 | 3 | 0 | 183 | 135 | 0.625 | Qualified for Playoffs |
| Glasgow Tigers | 8 | 4 | 4 | 0 | 241 | 143 | 0.500 | |
| Sunderland Kings | 8 | 0 | 8 | 0 | 12 | 328 | 0.000 | Withdrew after this season |

=== Northern Conference, Eastern Division ===
| Team | Pld | Won | Lst | Drw | PF | PA | Win% | |
|---|---|---|---|---|---|---|---|---|
| Leeds Celtics | 8 | 8 | 0 | 0 | 250 | 20 | 1.000 | Qualified for Playoffs |
| UCH Sharks | 8 | 4 | 2 | 2 | 77 | 101 | 0.625 | Qualified for Playoffs |
| UT Cougars | 8 | 4 | 4 | 0 | 114 | 141 | 0.500 | |
| Lancaster Bombers | 8 | 4 | 4 | 0 | 98 | 113 | 0.500 | |
| Sheffield Sabres | 8 | 0 | 7 | 1 | 32 | 169 | 0.062 | |

=== Northern Conference, Central Division ===
| Team | Pld | Won | Lst | Drw | PF | PA | Win% | |
|---|---|---|---|---|---|---|---|---|
| Nottingham Outlaws | 8 | 6 | 2 | 0 | 150 | 38 | 0.750 | Qualified for Playoffs |
| Staffordshire Stallions | 8 | 5 | 3 | 0 | 118 | 31 | 0.625 | Qualified for Playoffs |
| Loughborough Aces | 7 | 3 | 4 | 0 | 82 | 114 | 0.429 | |
| Derby Braves | 7 | 1 | 6 | 0 | 15 | 189 | 0.143 | |
| Leicester Lightning | 8 | 0 | 0 | 8 | 23 | 127 | 0.000 | |

=== Southern Conference, Eastern Division ===
| Team | Pld | Won | Lst | Drw | PF | PA | Win% | |
|---|---|---|---|---|---|---|---|---|
| Hertfordshire Hurricanes | 8 | 7 | 1 | 0 | 215 | 47 | 0.875 | Qualified for Playoffs |
| UKC Falcons | 8 | 6 | 2 | 0 | 159 | 56 | 0.750 | Qualified for Playoffs |
| Surrey Stingers | 8 | 3 | 5 | 0 | 110 | 152 | 0.375 | |
| UEA Pirates | 8 | 3 | 5 | 0 | 114 | 101 | 0.375 | |
| Essex Blades | 8 | 0 | 0 | 8 | 8 | 246 | 0.000 | |

=== Southern Conference, Central Division ===
| Team | Pld | Won | Lst | Drw | PF | PA | Win% | |
|---|---|---|---|---|---|---|---|---|
| Oxford Cavaliers | 8 | 6 | 1 | 1 | 146 | 66 | 0.812 | Qualified for Playoffs |
| Birmingham Lions | 8 | 6 | 2 | 0 | 170 | 60 | 0.750 | Qualified for Playoffs |
| Reading Knights | 7 | 3 | 4 | 0 | 88 | 141 | 0.429 | |
| Tarannau Aberystwyth | 8 | 2 | 6 | 0 | 76 | 122 | 0.250 | |
| Warwick Wolves | 7 | 0 | 7 | 0 | 18 | 179 | 0.000 | |

=== Southern Conference, Western Division ===
| Team | Pld | Won | Lst | Drw | PF | PA | Win% | |
|---|---|---|---|---|---|---|---|---|
| Cardiff Cobras | 8 | 7 | 1 | 0 | 138 | 67 | 0.875 | Qualified for Playoffs |
| Southampton Stags | 8 | 6 | 2 | 0 | 184 | 73 | 0.750 | Qualified for Playoffs |
| Bath Killer Bees | 8 | 6 | 2 | 0 | 129 | 79 | 0.750 | |
| Bristol Bullets | 8 | 4 | 4 | 0 | 113 | 92 | 0.500 | |
| Plymouth Blitz | 8 | 1 | 7 | 0 | 46 | 159 | 0.125 | |

== Playoffs ==
Wild Cards
N.E2 | UCH Sharks | 8
N.W1 | Nottingham Outlaws | 15
N.B2 | Newcastle Raiders | 6
N.W2 | Staffordshire Stallions | 11
S.W2 | Southampton Stags | 20
S.E2 | UKC Falcons | 8
N.C2 | Birmingham Lions | 10
N.C1 | Oxford Cavaliers | 6

Quarter-finals
N.B1 | Stirling Clansmen | 42
Nottingham Outlaws | 0
N.E1 | Leeds Celtics | 0
Staffordshire Stallions | 10
Southampton Stags | 30
S.W1 | Cardiff Cobras | 24
Birmingham Lions | 7
S.E1 | Herts. Hurricanes | 23

Semi-finals
Stirling Clansmen | 20
Staffordshire Stallions | 15
Southampton Stags | 18
Herts. Hurricanes | 49

College Bowl XVII
Stirling Clansmen | 22
Herts. Hurricanes | 17

- Note – the table does not indicate who played home or away in each fixture.
