= 1995–96 British Collegiate American Football League =

The 1995–96 British Collegiate American Football League season was the 11th full season of the BCAFL, organised by the British Students American Football Association (BSAFA, now the BAFA).

== Changes from last season ==
Division Changes
There were no changes to the Divisional setup.

Team Changes

- Aberdeen Steamrollers withdrew after one season (without playing a match)
- Stirling Clansmen withdrew after nine seasons

This reduced the number of teams in BCAFL (for the first time) to 27.

== Regular season ==
Locations of Scottish teams in BCAFL 1995–96
Locations of English and Welsh teams in BCAFL 1995–96

=== Northern Conference, Scottish Division ===
Team	Pld	Won	Lst	Drw	PF	PA	Win%	
Strathclyde Hawks	8	6	0	2	138	18	0.875	Qualified for Playoffs
Glasgow Tigers	8	4	2	2	82	23	0.625	
Paisley Panthers	8	0	8	0	8	224	0.000	

=== Northern Conference, Eastern Division ===
Team	Pld	Won	Lst	Drw	PF	PA	Win%	
Leeds Celtics	8	7	1	0	296	79	0.875	Qualified for Playoffs
Newcastle Mariners	8	5	3	0	204	105	0.625	
Lancaster Bombers	8	5	3	0	208	110	0.625	
Sunderland Wearwolves	8	2	6	0	81	246	0.250	
Teesside Demons	8	0	8	0	32	264	0.000	

=== Northern Conference, Central Division ===
Team	Pld	Won	Lst	Drw	PF	PA	Win%	
Loughborough Aces	8	8	0	0	230	20	1.000	Qualified for Playoffs
Leicester Lemmings	8	4	2	2	53	51	0.625	Qualified for Playoffs
Sheffield Zulus	8	3	4	1	38	109	0.438	
Hull Sharks	8	3	5	0	62	101	0.375	
Staffordshire Stallions	8	1	6	1	22	104	0.188	

=== Southern Conference, Eastern Division ===
Team	Pld	Won	Lst	Drw	PF	PA	Win%	
Cambridge Pythons	8	6	1	1	145	10	0.938	Qualified for Playoffs
UEA Pirates	8	5	3	0	192	110	0.625	
Reading Knights	8	2	4	2	57	108	0.375	
Surrey Stingers	8	2	5	1	72	144	0.312	
Hertfordshire Hurricanes	8	1	6	1	38	181	0.188	

=== Southern Conference, Central Division ===
Team	Pld	Won	Lst	Drw	PF	PA	Win%	
Birmingham Lions	8	7	0	1	180	78	0.938	Qualified for Playoffs
Warwick Wolves	8	2	3	3	32	54	0.438	
Oxford Cavaliers	8	3	4	1	137	129	0.438	
Tarannau Aberystwyth	8	3	4	1	112	159	0.438	
Aston Rhinos	8	2	5	1	96	135	0.312	

=== Southern Conference, Western Division ===
Team	Pld	Won	Lst	Drw	PF	PA	Win%	
Cardiff Cobras	8	7	0	1	150	18	0.938	Qualified for Playoffs
Bath Killer Bees	8	5	2	1	100	26	0.688	Qualified for Playoffs
Southampton Stags	8	4	4	0	132	122	0.500	
Bristol Bullets	8	0	8	0	22	191	0.000	

== Playoffs ==
Quarter-finals
N.E1	Leeds Celtics	26
N.S1	Strathclyde Hawks	18
N.C2	Leicester Lemmings	8
N.C1	Loughborough Aces	24
S.E1	Cambridge Pythons	17
S.C1	Birmingham Lions	6
S.W2	Bath Killer Bees	8
S.W1	Cardiff Cobras (3 x OT)	10

Semi-finals
Leeds Celtics	14
Loughborough Aces	7
Cambridge Pythons	6
Cardiff Cobras	12

College Bowl X
Leeds Celtics	14
Cardiff Cobras	8

- Note – the table does not indicate who played home or away in each fixture.
