= 2000–01 British Collegiate American Football League =

The 2000–01 British Collegiate American Football League season was the 16th full season of the BCAFL, organised by the British Students American Football Association (BSAFA, now the BAFA).

== Changes from last season ==
Division Changes
There were no changes to the Divisional setup

Team Changes

- Dundee Bluedevils withdrew after one season
- Lancaster Bombers moved within the Northern Conference from Eastern to Scottish Division(!)
- University of Sheffield rejoined the Northern Conference after three seasons away, as the Sabres
- Teesside Demons changed their name to the Cougars

This meant the number of teams in BCAFL stayed at 27.

== Regular season ==
Locations of Scottish teams in BCAFL 2000–01
Locations of English and Welsh teams in BCAFL 2000–01

=== Northern Conference, Scottish Division ===
Team	Pld	Won	Lst	Drw	PF	PA	Win%	
Glasgow Tigers	8	4	3	1	170	106	0.562	Qualified for Playoffs
Stirling Clansmen	8	4	3	1	120	104	0.562	
Lancaster Bombers	8	3	5	0	114	136	0.375	
Strathclyde Hawks	8	2	5	1	53	147	0.312	

=== Northern Conference, Eastern Division ===
Team	Pld	Won	Lst	Drw	PF	PA	Win%	
Teesside Cougars	8	6	1	1	90	50	0.812	Qualified for Playoffs
Hull Sharks	8	6	2	0	157	51	0.750	Qualified for Playoffs
Leeds Celtics	8	2	4	2	36	54	0.375	
Sheffield Sabres	8	1	7	0	24	87	0.125	
Newcastle Mariners	8	0	6	2	18	265	0.125	

=== Northern Conference, Central Division ===
Team	Pld	Won	Lst	Drw	PF	PA	Win%	
Loughborough Aces	8	6	2	0	160	31	0.750	Qualified for Playoffs
Staffordshire Stallions	8	5	2	1	106	67	0.688	Qualified for Playoffs
Leicester Lemmings	8	5	2	1	58	32	0.688	Qualified for Playoffs
Derby Braves	8	4	3	1	82	41	0.562	
Nottingham Outlaws	8	2	6	0	95	119	0.250	

=== Southern Conference, Eastern Division ===
Team	Pld	Won	Lst	Drw	PF	PA	Win%	
Hertfordshire Hurricanes	8	6	1	1	192	46	0.812	Qualified for Playoffs
UEA Pirates	8	4	3	1	60	78	0.562	Qualified for Playoffs
Surrey Stingers	8	3	4	1	60	135	0.438	
Kent Falcons	8	1	7	0	44	117	0.125	

=== Southern Conference, Central Division ===
Team	Pld	Won	Lst	Drw	PF	PA	Win%	
Oxford Cavaliers	8	7	1	0	234	91	0.875	Qualified for Playoffs
Birmingham Lions	8	6	2	0	275	83	0.750	Qualified for Playoffs
Warwick Wolves	8	2	6	0	56	145	0.250	
Tarannau Aberystwyth	8	0	8	0	18	292	0.000	

=== Southern Conference, Western Division ===
Team	Pld	Won	Lst	Drw	PF	PA	Win%	
Cardiff Cobras	8	7	0	1	199	55	0.938	Qualified for Playoffs
Southampton Stags	8	5	2	1	97	72	0.688	Qualified for Playoffs
Bristol Bullets	8	4	4	0	92	94	0.500	
Bath Killer Bees	8	2	4	2	122	79	0.375	
Reading Knights	8	2	6	0	45	200	0.250	

== Playoffs ==
Wild Cards
S.E2	UEA Pirates	0
S.E1	Herts. Hurricanes	68
S.W2	Southampton Stags	6
S.C2	Birmingham Lions	14
N.C3	Leicester Lemmings	6
N.Sc1	Glasgow Tigers	8
N.C2	Staffordshire Stallions	14
N.E2	Hull Sharks	6

Quarter-finals
S.C1	Oxford Cavaliers	14
Herts. Hurricanes	6
S.W1	Cardiff Cobras	16
Birmingham Lions	20
N.E1	Teesside Cougars	21
Glasgow Tigers	0
Staffordshire Stallions	6
N.C1	Loughborough Aces	17

Semi-finals
Oxford Cavaliers	18
Birmingham Lions	8
Teesside Cougars	14
Loughborough Aces	16

College Bowl XV
Oxford Cavaliers	26
Loughborough Aces	23

- Note – the table does not indicate who played home or away in each fixture.
