= College football (disambiguation) =

College football is gridiron football played at colleges and universities within the United States and Canada.

College football may also refer to:

- British Universities American Football League, college American football in the United Kingdom
- BUCS Football League, college association football in the United Kingdom
- NCAA Football Championship (Philippines), college association football in the Philippines
- Organización Nacional Estudiantil de Fútbol Americano, college American football in Mexico

== See also ==
- College soccer
- University and college sport
- University football
