= 1993–94 British Collegiate American Football League =

The 1993–94 British Collegiate American Football League season was the ninth full season of the BCAFL, organised by the British Students American Football Association (BSAFA, now the BAFA).

Division Changes
There were no changes to the Divisional setup.

Team Changes
There were no team changes, meaning the BCAFL stayed at 26 teams.

== Regular season ==
Locations of Scottish teams in BCAFL 1993–94
Locations of English and Welsh teams in BCAFL 1993–94

=== Northern Conference ===
| Team | Pld | Won | Lst | Drw | PF | PA | Win% | |
|---|---|---|---|---|---|---|---|---|
| Glasgow Tigers | 8 | 7 | 0 | 1 | 232 | 40 | 0.938 | Qualified for Playoffs |
| Leeds Celtics | 8 | 6 | 0 | 2 | 107 | 24 | 0.875 | Qualified for Playoffs |
| Paisley Panthers | 8 | 6 | 2 | 0 | 73 | 65 | 0.750 | Qualified for Playoffs |
| Sheffield Zulus | 8 | 4 | 2 | 2 | 129 | 74 | 0.625 | Qualified for Playoffs |
| Teesside Demons | 8 | 3 | 3 | 2 | 100 | 61 | 0.500 | |
| Hull Sharks | 8 | 3 | 4 | 1 | 75 | 73 | 0.438 | |
| Lancaster Bombers | 8 | 2 | 3 | 3 | 72 | 69 | 0.438 | |
| Newcastle Mariners | 8 | 2 | 4 | 2 | 72 | 133 | 0.375 | |
| Strathclyde Hawks | 8 | 2 | 5 | 1 | 58 | 81 | 0.312 | |
| Stirling Clansmen | 8 | 0 | 5 | 3 | 33 | 126 | 0.188 | |
| Sunderland Werewolves | 8 | 0 | 7 | 1 | 14 | 219 | 0.062 | |

=== Southern Conference ===
| Team | Pld | Won | Lst | Drw | PF | PA | Win% | |
|---|---|---|---|---|---|---|---|---|
| Cardiff Cobras | 8 | 8 | 0 | 0 | 156 | 40 | 1.000 | Qualified for Playoffs |
| Loughborough Aces | 8 | 7 | 1 | 0 | 155 | 40 | 0.875 | Qualified for Playoffs |
| Staffordshire Stallions | 8 | 6 | 1 | 1 | 173 | 32 | 0.812 | Qualified for Playoffs |
| Leicester Lemmings | 8 | 6 | 1 | 1 | 106 | 59 | 0.812 | Qualified for Playoffs |
| Cambridge Pythons | 8 | 6 | 2 | 0 | 98 | 69 | 0.750 | |
| Oxford Cavaliers | 8 | 5 | 3 | 0 | 131 | 69 | 0.625 | |
| Bristol Bullets | 8 | 4 | 3 | 1 | 120 | 96 | 0.562 | |
| Southampton Stags | 8 | 3 | 4 | 1 | 74 | 88 | 0.438 | |
| Bath Killer Bees | 8 | 3 | 5 | 0 | 75 | 106 | 0.375 | |
| Warwick Wolves | 8 | 3 | 5 | 0 | 38 | 124 | 0.375 | |
| Aston Rhinos | 8 | 2 | 6 | 0 | 54 | 115 | 0.250 | |
| Birmingham Lions | 8 | 2 | 6 | 0 | 93 | 143 | 0.250 | |
| UEA Pirates | 8 | 1 | 7 | 0 | 36 | 142 | 0.125 | |
| Tarannau Aberystwyth | 8 | 1 | 7 | 0 | 8 | 87 | 0.125 | |
| Reading Knights | 8 | 1 | 7 | 0 | 1 | 107 | 0.125 | |

== Playoffs ==
Quarter-finals
N1 | Glasgow Tigers (Note 1) | 0
N4 | Sheffield Zulus | 0
N3 | Paisley Panthers | 0
N2 | Leeds Celtics (Note 1) | 0
S2 | Loughborough Aces | 7
S3 | Staffordshire Stallions | 0
S1 | Cardiff Cobras | 8
S4 | Leicester Lemmings | 16

Semi-finals
Glasgow Tigers | 20
Leeds Celtics | 6
Loughborough Aces | 12
Leicester Lemmings | 34

College Bowl VIII
Glasgow Tigers | 26
Leicester Lemmings | 0

- Note 1 – After Overtime; Glasgow and Leeds advanced as they were the higher-seeded teams.
- Note 2 – the table does not indicate who played home or away in each fixture.
