= 1997–98 British Collegiate American Football League =

British American football season

The 1997–98 British Collegiate American Football League season was the 13th full season of the BCAFL, organised by the British Students American Football Association (BSAFA, now the BAFA).

== Changes from last season ==
Division Changes
There were no changes to the Divisional setup

Team Changes

- Aston Rhinos withdrew after seven seasons
- Cambridge Pythons withdrew after seven seasons
- Hull Sharks moved within the Northern Conference from Central to Eastern Division
- Paisley Panthers withdrew after eight seasons
- Sheffield Zulus withdrew after eight seasons

This decreased the number of teams in BCAFL to 27.

== Regular season ==
Locations of Scottish teams in BCAFL 1997–98
Locations of English and Welsh teams in BCAFL 1997–98

=== Northern Conference, Scottish Division ===
Team	Pld	Won	Lst	Drw	PF	PA	Win%	
Glasgow Tigers	8	5	2	1	274	125	0.688	Qualified for Playoffs
Strathclyde Hawks	8	3	4	1	108	212	0.438	
Stirling Clansmen	8	1	5	2	100	241	0.250	

=== Northern Conference, Eastern Division ===
Team	Pld	Won	Lst	Drw	PF	PA	Win%	
Leeds Celtics	8	8	0	0	393	79	1.000	Qualified for Playoffs
Hull Sharks	8	6	2	0	144	116	0.750	Qualified for Playoffs
Newcastle Mariners	8	6	2	0	278	122	0.750	
Teesside Demons	8	4	4	0	120	160	0.500	
Lancaster Bombers	8	2	6	0	50	267	0.250	
Sunderland Wearwolves	8	0	8	0	64	253	0.000	

=== Northern Conference, Central Division ===
Team	Pld	Won	Lst	Drw	PF	PA	Win%	
Loughborough Aces	8	7	1	0	272	48	0.875	Qualified for Playoffs
Derby Braves	8	5	3	0	104	73	0.625	
Nottingham Outlaws	8	4	4	0	138	81	0.500	
Staffordshire Stallions	8	2	6	0	68	185	0.250	
Leicester Lemmings	8	0	8	0	13	230	0.000	

=== Southern Conference, Eastern Division ===
Team	Pld	Won	Lst	Drw	PF	PA	Win%	
Hertfordshire Hurricanes	8	8	0	0	300	8	1.000	Qualified for Playoffs
UEA Pirates	8	4	4	0	106	133	0.500	
Surrey Stingers	8	3	5	0	116	165	0.375	
Kent Falcons	8	2	6	0	96	220	0.250	

=== Southern Conference, Central Division ===
Team	Pld	Won	Lst	Drw	PF	PA	Win%	
Tarannau Aberystwyth	8	7	1	0	134	37	0.875	Qualified for Playoffs
Warwick Wolves	8	5	3	0	130	92	0.625	
Birmingham Lions	8	4	4	0	85	92	0.500	
Oxford Cavaliers	8	1	7	0	36	147	0.125	

=== Southern Conference, Western Division ===
Team	Pld	Won	Lst	Drw	PF	PA	Win%	
Cardiff Cobras	8	5	1	2	110	44	0.750	Qualified for Playoffs
Southampton Stags	8	5	1	2	181	29	0.750	Qualified for Playoffs
Bath Killer Bees	8	4	3	1	205	58	0.562	
Reading Knights	8	2	6	0	94	241	0.250	
Bristol Bullets	8	0	7	1	10	299	0.062	

== Playoffs ==
Quarter-finals
S.E1	Hertfordshire Hurricanes	21
S.W2	Southampton Stags	0
S.W1	Cardiff Cobras	18
S.C1	Tarannau Aberystwyth	20
N.S1	Glasgow Tigers	48
N.C1	Loughborough Aces	33
N.E2	Hull Sharks	0
N.E1	Leeds Celtics	20

Semi-finals
Hertfordshire Hurricanes	29
Tarannau Aberystwyth	6
Glasgow Tigers	14
Leeds Celtics	45

College Bowl XII
Hertfordshire Hurricanes	16
Leeds Celtics	7

- Note – the table does not indicate who played home or away in each fixture.
