= 2005–06 British Collegiate American Football League =

The 2005–06 British Collegiate American Football League season was the 21st full season of the BCAFL, organised by the British Students American Football Association (BSAFA, now the BAFA).

== Changes from last season ==
Divisional Changes
There were no changes to the Divisional setup

Team Changes

- Royal Holloway, University of London joined the Southern Conference, as the APU Phantoms
- UKC Falcons changed their name back to Kent Falcons

This increased the number of teams in BCAFL to 37.

== Regular season ==
Locations of Scottish teams in BCAFL 2005–06
Locations of English and Welsh teams in BCAFL 2005–06

=== Northern Conference, Scottish Division ===
Team	Pld	Won	Lst	Drw	PF	PA	Win%	
Glasgow Tigers	8	7	1	0	225	81	0.875	Qualified for Playoffs
Stirling Clansmen	8	4	3	1	92	52	0.562	Qualified for Playoffs
Edinburgh Timberwolves	8	4	4	0	94	75	0.500	
Caledonian Roughriders	8	6	2	0	88	139	0.250	
Paisley Pyros	8	1	7	0	88	300	0.125	

=== Northern Conference, Eastern Division ===
Team	Pld	Won	Lst	Drw	PF	PA	Win%	
UT Cougars	8	7	1	0	238	92	0.875	Qualified for Playoffs
Leeds Celtics	8	5	3	0	132	88	0.625	Qualified for Playoffs
Newcastle Raiders	8	4	3	1	103	74	0.562	Qualified for Playoffs
Sunderland Kings	8	2	5	1	80	157	0.312	
UCH Sharks	8	1	6	1	41	148	0.188	

=== Northern Conference, Western Division ===
Team	Pld	Won	Lst	Drw	PF	PA	Win%	
Staffordshire Stallions	8	5	2	1	231	181	0.688	Qualified for Playoffs
Sheffield Sabres	8	5	3	0	222	98	0.625	Qualified for Playoffs
Lancaster Bombers	8	4	4	0	112	174	0.500	
Sheffield Hallam Warriors	8	1	7	0	55	184	0.125	

=== Northern Conference, Central Division ===
Team	Pld	Won	Lst	Drw	PF	PA	Win%	
Loughborough Aces	8	8	0	0	195	35	1.000	Qualified for Playoffs
Nottingham Outlaws	8	4	4	0	110	114	0.500	
Derby Braves	8	4	4	0	159	114	0.500	
Leicester Lightning	8	0	0	8	12	253	0.000	

=== Southern Conference, Central Division ===
Team	Pld	Won	Lst	Drw	PF	PA	Win%	
Birmingham Lions	8	8	0	0	371	92	1.000	Qualified for Playoffs
Tarannau Aberystwyth	8	4	3	1	158	157	0.562	
Warwick Wolves	8	3	5	0	118	171	0.375	
Oxford Cavaliers	8	2	6	0	67	230	0.250	

=== Southern Conference, Eastern Division ===
Team	Pld	Won	Lst	Drw	PF	PA	Win%	
Greenwich Mariners	8	6	2	0	148	61	0.750	Qualified for Playoffs
Hertfordshire Hurricanes	8	5	3	0	199	119	0.625	Qualified for Playoffs
Essex Blades	8	4	3	1	116	101	0.562	
UEA Pirates	8	3	5	0	151	178	0.375	
APU Phantoms	8	1	7	0	36	207	0.125	

=== Southern Conference, Western Division ===
Team	Pld	Won	Lst	Drw	PF	PA	Win%	
Cardiff Cobras	8	6	1	1	181	57	0.812	Qualified for Playoffs
Bristol Bullets	8	6	2	0	254	104	0.750	Qualified for Playoffs
Bath Killer Bees	8	5	2	1	187	107	0.688	Qualified for Playoffs
Plymouth Blitz	8	2	6	0	78	221	0.250	

=== Southern Conference, Southern Division ===
Team	Pld	Won	Lst	Drw	PF	PA	Win%	
Surrey Stingers	8	6	1	1	186	88	0.812	Qualified for Playoffs
Southampton Stags	8	6	2	0	423	108	0.750	Qualified for Playoffs
Kent Falcons	8	3	5	0	83	181	0.375	
Brighton Tsunami	8	2	6	0	68	191	0.250	
Royal Holloway Vikings	8	2	6	0	116	303	0.250	
Reading Knights	8	1	7	0	80	262	0.125	

== Playoffs ==
1st round
S.S2	Southampton Stags	63
S.S1	Surrey Stingers	14
S.E2	Herts. Hurricanes	14
S.C1	Birmingham Lions	21
S.W2	Bristol Bullets	22
S.E1	Greenwich Mariners	6
S.W3	Bath Killer Bees	12
S.W1	Cardiff Cobras	25
N.C1	Loughborough Aces	30
N.S2	Stirling Clansmen	7
N.S1	Glasgow Tigers	11
N.E3	Newcastle Raiders	22
N.W1	Staffordshire Stallions	6
N.E2	Leeds Celtics	0
N.W2	Sheffield Sabres	12
N.E1	UT Cougars	46

Quarter-finals
Southampton Stags	19
Birmingham Lions	14
Bristol Bullets	6
Cardiff Cobras	14
Loughborough Aces	34
Newcastle Raiders	2
Staffordshire Stallions	6
UT Cougars	26

Semi-finals
Southampton Stags	19
Cardiff Cobras	6
Loughborough Aces	14
UT Cougars	21

College Bowl XX
Southampton Stags	79
UT Cougars	8

- Note – the table does not indicate who played home or away in each fixture.
