= 1998–99 British Collegiate American Football League =

The 1998–99 British Collegiate American Football League season was the 14th full season of the BCAFL, organised by the British Students American Football Association (BSAFA, now the BAFA).

== Changes from last season ==
Divisional Changes
There were no changes to the Divisional setup

Team Changes
There were no team changes, meaning the BCAFL stayed at 27 teams.

== Regular season ==
Locations of Scottish teams in BCAFL 1998–99
Locations of English and Welsh teams in BCAFL 1998–99

=== Northern Conference, Scottish Division ===
Team	Pld	Won	Lst	Drw	PF	PA	Win%	
Strathclyde Hawks	8	3	3	2	111	121	0.500	Qualified for Playoffs
Glasgow Tigers	8	3	3	2	69	60	0.500	
Stirling Clansmen	8	3	4	1	104	138	0.438	

=== Northern Conference, Eastern Division ===
Team	Pld	Won	Lst	Drw	PF	PA	Win%	
Leeds Celtics	8	7	1	0	193	61	0.875	Qualified for Playoffs
Lancaster Bombers	8	6	1	1	188	60	0.813	Qualified for Playoffs
Newcastle Mariners	8	6	2	0	158	62	0.750	
Hull Sharks	8	3	5	0	27	101	0.375	
Teesside Demons	8	1	7	0	42	148	0.125	
Sunderland Wearwolves	8	1	7	0	45	191	0.125	Withdrew after this season.

=== Northern Conference, Central Division ===
Team	Pld	Won	Lst	Drw	PF	PA	Win%	
Loughborough Aces	8	7	1	0	198	68	0.875	Qualified for Playoffs
Derby Braves	8	6	2	0	109	110	0.750	
Nottingham Outlaws	8	4	4	0	108	95	0.500	
Leicester Lemmings	8	3	5	0	83	112	0.375	
Staffordshire Stallions	8	1	7	0	46	103	0.125	

=== Southern Conference, Eastern Division ===
Team	Pld	Won	Lst	Drw	PF	PA	Win%	
Hertfordshire Hurricanes	8	7	0	1	190	27	0.938	Qualified for Playoffs
Surrey Stingers	7	4	3	0	166	82	0.571	
Kent Falcons	8	2	6	0	54	245	0.250	
UEA Pirates	8	1	6	1	24	142	0.188	

=== Southern Conference, Central Division ===
Team	Pld	Won	Lst	Drw	PF	PA	Win%	
Birmingham Lions	8	7	1	0	192	67	0.875	Qualified for Playoffs
Oxford Cavaliers	8	6	2	0	185	93	0.750	Qualified for Playoffs
Tarannau Aberystwyth	8	3	5	0	113	114	0.375	
Warwick Wolves	8	1	7	0	20	195	0.125	

=== Southern Conference, Western Division ===
Team	Pld	Won	Lst	Drw	PF	PA	Win%	
Cardiff Cobras	8	7	1	0	179	33	0.875	Qualified for Playoffs
Bath Killer Bees	8	5	3	0	162	85	0.625	
Southampton Stags	8	3	4	1	112	107	0.438	
Reading Knights	8	2	5	1	47	96	0.312	
Bristol Bullets	7	0	7	0	30	239	0.000	

== Playoffs ==
Quarter-finals
S.E1	Hertfordshire Hurricanes	7
S.C2	Oxford Cavaliers	2
S.C1	Birmingham Lions	0
S.W1	Cardiff Cobras	26
N.E1	Leeds Celtics	18
N.Sc1	Strathclyde Hawks	0
N.E2	Lancaster Bombers	12
N.C1	Loughborough Aces	28

Semi-finals
Hertfordshire Hurricanes	27
Cardiff Cobras	6
Leeds Celtics	14
Loughborough Aces	20

College Bowl XIII
Hertfordshire Hurricanes	7
Loughborough Aces	3

- Note – the table does not indicate who played home or away in each fixture.
