= 1988–89 British Collegiate American Football League =

The 1988–89 BCAFL was the fourth full season of the British Collegiate American Football League, organised by the British Students American Football Association.

== Changes from previous season ==
BCAFL stayed at 11 teams

=== Division changes ===
There were no changes to the divisional setup

=== Team changes ===
- Loughborough University joined the Southern Conference, playing as the Aces
- Manchester MPs withdrew after three seasons

== Regular season ==
Locations of Scottish teams in BCAFL 1988-89
Locations of English and Welsh teams in BCAFL 1988-89

=== Scottish Conference ===
Team	Pld	Won	Lst	Drw	PF	PA	Win%	
Strathclyde Hawks	6	6	0	0	97	25	1.000	Qualified for Playoffs
Stirling Clansmen	6	2	4	0	108	58	0.333	
Glasgow Tigers	6	1	5	0	12	134	0.167	

=== Northern Conference ===
Team	Pld	Won	Lst	Drw	PF	PA	Win%	
Hull Sharks	4	2	2	0	48	1	0.500	Qualified for Playoffs
Teesside Demons	4	2	2	0	62	54	0.500	Qualified for Playoffs
Newcastle Scholars	4	2	2	0	8	50	0.500	

=== Southern Conference ===
Team	Pld	Won	Lst	Drw	PF	PA	Win%	
Loughborough Aces	8	8	0	0	127	20	1.000	Qualified for Playoffs
Cardiff Cobras	8	6	2	0	100	51	0.750	Qualified for Playoffs
Leicester Lemmings	8	3	5	0	23	66	0.375	
UEA Pirates	8	3	5	0	3	80	0.375	
Reading Knights	8	0	8	0	0	36	0.000	

== Playoffs ==
Wild card
N1	Hull Sharks	34
N2	Teesside Demons	0

Semi-finals
Hull Sharks	21
S1	Loughborough Aces	7
Sc1	Strathclyde Hawks	3
S2	Cardiff Cobras	13

College Bowl III
Hull Sharks	7
Cardiff Cobras	6
