= Glasgow Tigers =

Glasgow Tigers may refer to:

- Glasgow Tigers (American football), an American football team competing in the BAFA National Leagues
- Glasgow Tigers (speedway), a motorcycle speedway team competing in the Speedway Premier League
