= 1999–2000 British Collegiate American Football League =

The 1999–2000 BCAFL was the 15th full season of the British Collegiate American Football League, organised by the British Students American Football Association.

== Changes from last season ==
Division Changes
There were no changes to the Divisional lineup

Team Changes

- University of Dundee joined the Northern Conference, as the Bluedevils
- Sunderland Wearwolves withdrew after seven seasons

This meant the number of teams in BCAFL stayed at 27.

== Regular season ==
Locations of Scottish teams in BCAFL 1999–2000
Locations of English and Welsh teams in BCAFL 1999–2000

=== Northern Conference, Scottish Division ===
Team	Pld	Won	Lst	Drw	PF	PA	Win%	
Stirling Clansmen	8	6	2	0	114	86	0.750	Qualified for Playoffs
Glasgow Tigers	8	5	3	0	220	60	0.625	
Strathclyde Hawks	8	3	5	0	44	126	0.375	
Dundee Bluedevils	8	1	7	0	9	159	0.125	

=== Northern Conference, Eastern Division ===
Team	Pld	Won	Lst	Drw	PF	PA	Win%	
Lancaster Bombers	8	7	1	0	108	46	0.875	Qualified for Playoffs
Leeds Celtics	8	5	2	1	32	60	0.688	
Newcastle Mariners	8	5	3	0	81	95	0.625	
Hull Sharks	8	3	5	0	55	74	0.375	
Teesside Demons	8	2	6	0	45	103	0.250	

=== Northern Conference, Central Division ===
Team	Pld	Won	Lst	Drw	PF	PA	Win%	
Leicester Lemmings	8	6	2	0	104	96	0.750	Qualified for Playoffs
Loughborough Aces	8	6	2	0	231	72	0.750	Qualified for Playoffs
Staffordshire Stallions	8	4	3	1	90	130	0.563	
Nottingham Outlaws	8	4	4	0	108	114	0.500	
Derby Braves	8	1	6	1	48	106	0.188	

=== Southern Conference, Eastern Division ===
Team	Pld	Won	Lst	Drw	PF	PA	Win%	
Hertfordshire Hurricanes	8	7	1	0	260	66	0.875	Qualified for Playoffs
Surrey Stingers	8	6	2	0	231	127	0.750	
UEA Pirates	8	5	3	0	110	111	0.625	
Kent Falcons	8	1	7	0	41	220	0.125	

=== Southern Conference, Central Division ===
Team	Pld	Won	Lst	Drw	PF	PA	Win%	
Oxford Cavaliers	8	5	3	0	161	119	0.625	Qualified for Playoffs
Birmingham Lions	8	3	4	1	134	180	0.438	
Tarannau Aberystwyth	8	1	6	1	90	188	0.188	
Warwick Wolves	8	1	7	0	53	177	0.125	

=== Southern Conference, Western Division ===
Team	Pld	Won	Lst	Drw	PF	PA	Win%	
Bath Killer Bees	8	6	2	0	221	102	0.750	Qualified for Playoffs
Cardiff Cobras	8	6	2	0	246	151	0.750	Qualified for Playoffs
Southampton Stags	8	4	4	0	113	101	0.500	
Reading Knights	8	3	4	1	64	97	0.438	
Bristol Bullets	8	2	4	2	78	114	0.375	

== Playoffs ==
Quarter-finals
S.E1	Hertfordshire Hurricanes	19
S.W2	Cardiff Cobras	6
S.W1	Bath Killer Bees	38
S.C1	Oxford Cavaliers	46
N.E1	Lancaster Bombers	26
N.C2	Loughborough Aces	6
N.Sc1	Stirling Clansmen	0
N.C1	Leicester Lemmings	52

Semi-finals
Hertfordshire Hurricanes	22
Oxford Cavaliers	8
Lancaster Bombers	6
Leicester Lemmings	14

College Bowl XIV
Hertfordshire Hurricanes	20
Leicester Lemmings	6

- Note – the table does not indicate who played home or away in each fixture.
