= 1991–92 British Collegiate American Football League =

The 1991–92 BCAFL was the seventh full season of the British Collegiate American Football League, organised by the British Students American Football Association.

== Changes from last season ==
Division Changes
There were no changes to the Divisional setup.

Team Changes

- Lancaster University joined the Northern Conference, as the Bombers
- Newcastle Mariners withdrew at the end of the previous season
- University of Oxford joined the Southern Conference, as the Cavaliers

This increased the number of teams in BCAFL to 20.

== Regular season ==
Locations of Scottish teams in BCAFL 1991–92
Locations of English and Welsh teams in BCAFL 1991–92

=== Northern Conference ===
Team	Pld	Won	Lst	Drw	PF	PA	Win%	
Teesside Demons	8	6	2	0	85	41	0.750	Qualified for Playoffs
Strathclyde Hawks	8	6	2	0	199	58	0.750	Qualified for Playoffs
Leeds Celtics	8	5	1	2	76	34	0.750	Qualified for Playoffs
Glasgow Tigers	8	5	3	0	80	71	0.625	Qualified for Playoffs
Sheffield Zulus	8	5	3	0	76	30	0.625	
Hull Sharks	8	3	4	1	38	78	0.438	
Paisley Panthers	8	2	6	0	35	94	0.250	
Stirling Clansmen	8	1	6	1	17	102	0.188	
Lancaster Bombers	8	1	7	0	31	129	0.125	

=== Southern Conference ===
Team	Pld	Won	Lst	Drw	PF	PA	Win%	
Southampton Stags	8	8	0	0	208	12	1.000	Qualified for Playoffs
Leicester Lemmings	8	7	1	0	132	43	0.875	Qualified for Playoffs
Loughborough Aces	8	6	2	0	154	111	0.750	Qualified for Playoffs
Oxford Cavaliers	8	6	2	0	101	89	0.750	Qualified for Playoffs
Cambridge Pythons	8	4	4	0	120	156	0.500	
Cardiff Cobras	8	3	5	0	45	106	0.375	
Aston Rhinos	8	3	5	0	64	112	0.375	
UEA Pirates	8	3	5	0	69	112	0.375	
Birmingham Lions	8	2	5	1	41	110	0.312	
Warwick Wolves	8	1	6	1	32	88	0.188	
Reading Knights	8	0	8	0	38	65	0.000	

== Playoffs ==
Quarter-finals
S1	Southampton Stags	27
S4	Oxford Cavaliers	0
S2	Leicester Lemmings	8
S3	Loughborough Aces	17
N1	Teesside Demons	30
N2	Strathclyde Hawks	0
N3	Leeds Celtics	8
N4	Glasgow Tigers	14

Semi-finals
Southampton Stags	32
Loughborough Aces	0
Teesside Demons	0
Glasgow Tigers	8

College Bowl VI
Southampton Stags	53
Glasgow Tigers	0

- Note – the table does not indicate who played home or away in each fixture.
