= University football =

University football may refer to American football, association football (soccer) or Canadian football played at universities in various countries, including:

- British Universities American Football League, American football at universities in the United Kingdom
- BUCS Football League, association football at universities in the United Kingdom
- NCAA Football Championship (Philippines), association football at universities in the Philippines
- Organización Nacional Estudiantil de Fútbol Americano, American football at universities in Mexico
- U Sports football, Canadian football at universities in Canada

== See also ==
- College football
- College soccer
- University and college sport
