= 1994–95 British Collegiate American Football League =

The 1994–95 BCAFL was the 10th full season of the British Collegiate American Football League, organised by the British Students American Football Association.

== Changes from last season ==
Division Changes

- The two Conferences were split into Divisions:
  - Northern Conference became the Scottish, Eastern & Central Divisions
  - Southern Conference became the Eastern, Central & Western Divisions

Team Changes

- University of Aberdeen joined the Northern Conference, as the Steamrollers
- University of Hertfordshire joined the Southern Conference, as the Hurricanes
- Leicester Lemmings moved from the Southern Conference to the Northern Conference, Central Division.
- Loughborough Aces moved from the Southern Conference to the Northern Conference, Central Division.
- Staffordshire Stallions moved from the Southern Conference to the Northern Conference, Central Division.
- University of Surrey joined the Southern Conference, as the Stingers

This increased the number of teams in BCAFL to 29.

== Regular season ==
Locations of Scottish teams in BCAFL 1994–95
Locations of English and Welsh teams in BCAFL 1994–95

=== Northern Conference, Scottish Division ===
Team	Pld	Won	Lst	Drw	PF	PA	Win%	
Glasgow Tigers	8	6	1	1	245	51	0.812	Qualified for Playoffs
Strathclyde Hawks	8	4	3	1	65	140	0.562	
Paisley Panthers	8	4	4	0	tbc	96	0.500	
Stirling Clansmen	8	3	4	1	26	88	0.438	Withdrew after this season
Aberdeen Steamrollers	8	0	0	8	0	8	0.000	All games awarded, withdrew after this season

=== Northern Conference, Eastern Division ===
Team	Pld	Won	Lst	Drw	PF	PA	Win%	
Leeds Celtics	8	5	2	1	168	67	0.688	Qualified for Playoffs
Lancaster Bombers	8	5	3	0	176	153	0.625	
Sunderland Wearwolves	8	5	3	0	98	80	0.625	
Teesside Demons	8	1	5	2	7	154	0.250	
Newcastle Mariners	8	1	7	0	46	151	0.125	

=== Northern Conference, Central Division ===
Team	Pld	Won	Lst	Drw	PF	PA	Win%	
Staffordshire Stallions	8	6	0	2	245	54	0.750	Qualified for Playoffs
Loughborough Aces	8	7	1	0	144	39	0.750	Qualified for Playoffs
Leicester Lemmings	8	4	4	0	107	86	0.500	
Sheffield Zulus	8	3	4	1	114	144	0.438	
Hull Sharks	8	1	6	1	54	188	0.188	

=== Southern Conference, Eastern Division ===
Team	Pld	Won	Lst	Drw	PF	PA	Win%	
Cambridge Pythons	8	8	0	0	395	21	1.000	Qualified for Playoffs
UEA Pirates	8	4	3	1	98	91	0.562	
Hertfordshire Hurricanes	8	2	4	2	80	101	0.375	
Reading Knights	8	1	5	2	16	246	0.250	
Surrey Stingers	8	2	6	0	40	169	0.250	

=== Southern Conference, Central Division ===
Team	Pld	Won	Lst	Drw	PF	PA	Win%	
Tarannau Aberystwyth	8	7	0	1	121	20	0.938	Qualified for Playoffs
Birmingham Lions	8	5	3	0	166	60	0.625	Qualified for Playoffs
Oxford Cavaliers	8	4	3	1	72	113	0.562	
Warwick Wolves	8	2	6	0	63	75	0.250	
Aston Rhinos	8	1	7	0	36	254	0.125	

=== Southern Conference, Western Division ===
Team	Pld	Won	Lst	Drw	PF	PA	Win%	
Cardiff Cobras	8	6	1	1	70	15	0.812	Qualified for Playoffs
Southampton Stags	8	5	2	1	126	27	0.688	
Bristol Bullets	8	1	3	4	20	74	0.375	
Bath Killer Bees	8	1	6	1	62	99	0.188	

== Playoffs ==
Quarter-finals
N.C2	Loughborough Aces	25
N.C1	Staffordshire Stallions	0
N.E1	Leeds Celtics	0
N.S1	Glasgow Tigers	42
S.C1	Tarannau Aberystwyth	6
S.W1	Cardiff Cobras	0
S.C2	Birmingham Lions	0
S.E1	Cambridge Pythons	42

Semi-finals
Loughborough Aces	20
Glasgow Tigers	7
Tarannau Aberystwyth	22
Cambridge Pythons	34

College Bowl IX
Loughborough Aces	23
Cambridge Pythons	20

- Note – the table does not indicate who played home or away in each fixture.
