= 2003–04 British Collegiate American Football League =

The 2003–04 BCAFL was the 19th full season of the British Collegiate American Football League, organised by the British Students American Football Association.

== Changes from last season ==
Divisional Changes

- The Northern Conference, Central Division became Western Division
- The Southern Conference expanded from three Divisions to four (gaining a Southern Division)

Team Changes

- Anglia Polytechnic University joined the Southern Conference, as the APU Phantoms
- University of Brighton joined the Southern Conference, as the Tsunami
- Glasgow Caledonian University joined the Northern Conference, as the Caledonian Roughriders
- Lancaster Bombers moved within the Northern Conference from Eastern to Borders Division
- Reading Knights moved within the Southern Conference from Central to Southern Division
- Sheffield Hallam University joined the Northern Conference, as the Warriors
- Southampton Stags moved within the Southern Conference from Western to Southern Division
- Sunderland Kings withdrew after one season back
- Surrey Stingers moved within the Southern Conference from Eastern to Southern Division

This increased the number of teams in BCAFL to 32.

== Regular season ==
Locations of Scottish teams in BCAFL 2003–04
Locations of English and Welsh teams in BCAFL 2003–04

=== Northern Conference, Borders Division ===
Team	Pld	Won	Lst	Drw	PF	PA	Win%	
Stirling Clansmen	8	6	2	0	236	126	0.750	Qualified for Playoffs
Glasgow Tigers	8	5	3	0	270	129	0.625	Qualified for Playoffs
Newcastle Raiders	8	5	3	0	189	120	0.625	
Lancaster Bombers	8	2	6	0	121	134	0.250	
Caledonian Roughriders	8	0	8	0	36	376	0.000	

=== Northern Conference, Eastern Division ===
Team	Pld	Won	Lst	Drw	PF	PA	Win%	
Leeds Celtics	8	7	1	0	100	51	0.875	Qualified for Playoffs
Sheffield Sabres	8	5	3	0	174	136	0.625	
UT Cougars	8	4	4	0	195	134	0.500	
UCH Sharks	8	3	5	0	83	114	0.375	
Sheffield Hallam Warriors	8	2	6	0	110	125	0.250	

=== Northern Conference, Western Division ===
Team	Pld	Won	Lst	Drw	PF	PA	Win%	
Staffordshire Stallions	8	7	1	0	252	54	0.875	Qualified for Playoffs
Loughborough Aces	8	7	1	0	161	102	0.875	Qualified for Playoffs
Nottingham Outlaws	8	6	2	0	172	100	0.750	Qualified for Playoffs
Leicester Lightning	8	2	5	1	35	197	0.312	
Derby Braves	8	0	8	0	56	233	0.143	

=== Southern Conference, Central Division ===
Team	Pld	Won	Lst	Drw	PF	PA	Win%	
Birmingham Lions	8	8	0	0	286	31	1.000	Qualified for Playoffs
Warwick Wolves	8	6	2	0	185	126	0.750	
Oxford Cavaliers	8	1	7	0	29	176	0.125	
Tarannau Aberystwyth	8	1	7	0	36	226	0.125	

=== Southern Conference, Eastern Division ===
Team	Pld	Won	Lst	Drw	PF	PA	Win%	
Hertfordshire Hurricanes	8	8	0	0	300	32	1.000	Qualified for Playoffs
UEA Pirates	8	6	2	0	163	84	0.750	Qualified for Playoffs
Essex Blades	8	3	4	1	97	151	0.438	
UKC Falcons	8	3	5	0	101	187	0.375	
APU Phantoms	8	0	8	0	2	219	0.000	

=== Southern Conference, Western Division ===
Team	Pld	Won	Lst	Drw	PF	PA	Win%	
Cardiff Cobras	8	6	2	0	186	67	0.750	Qualified for Playoffs
Bristol Bullets	8	6	2	0	160	66	0.750	
Plymouth Blitz	8	3	5	0	74	94	0.375	
Bath Killer Bees	8	2	6	0	92	162	0.250	

=== Southern Conference, Southern Division ===
Team	Pld	Won	Lst	Drw	PF	PA	Win%	
Southampton Stags	8	6	2	0	305	80	0.750	Qualified for Playoffs
Brighton Tsunami	8	5	3	0	44	73	0.625	
Surrey Stingers	8	2	6	0	44	152	0.250	
Reading Knights	8	2	6	0	44	152	0.250	

== Playoffs ==
Wild Cards
S.E2	UEA Pirates	0
S.W1	Cardiff Cobras	8
S.S1	Southampton Stags	27
S.C2	Warwick Wolves	6
N.W3	Nottingham Outlaws	7
N.W2	Loughborough Aces	40
N.B1	Stirling Clansmen	32
N.B2	Glasgow Tigers	24

Quarter-finals
S.E1	Herts. Hurricanes	26
Cardiff Cobras	0
Southampton Stags	0
S.C1	Birmingham Lions	33
N.E1	Leeds Celtics	20
Loughborough Aces	14
Stirling Clansmen	6
N.W1	Staffordshire Stallions	28

Semi-finals
Herts. Hurricanes	32
Birmingham Lions	20
Leeds Celtics	22
Staffordshire Stallions	30

College Bowl XVIII
Herts. Hurricanes	27
Staffordshire Stallions	6

- Note – the table does not indicate who played home or away in each fixture.
