= 1986–87 British Collegiate American Football League =

The 1986–87 BCAFL was the 2nd full season of the British Collegiate American Football League, organised by the British Students American Football Association.

== Division changes ==
With the increase in numbers, the single Division was replaced with two Conferences (Scottish & Northern), along with end-of-season playoffs.

== Team changes ==
After the completion of the first season, the League returned with all four of the previous season's teams joined by four new entries from:

- University of Glasgow, playing as the Tigers
- University of Leicester, playing as the Lemmings
- University of Stirling, playing as the Clansmen
- University of Strathclyde, playing as the Hawks

== Regular season ==
Locations of Scottish teams in BCAFL 1986-87
Locations of English teams in BCAFL 1986-87

=== Scottish Conference ===
Team	Pld	Won	Lst	Drw	PF	PA	Win%	
Newcastle Scholars	6	4	1	1	4	1	0.750	Qualified for Playoffs
Stirling Clansmen	6	4	2	0	27	23	0.667	Qualified for Playoffs
Strathclyde Hawks	6	3	2	1	24	25	0.583	
Glasgow Tigers	6	0	6	0	0	6	0.000	

Note - All Glasgow's matches were awarded.

=== Northern Conference ===
Team	Pld	Won	Lst	Drw	PF	PA	Win%	
Hull Sharks	6	6	0	0	138	21	1.000	Qualified for Playoffs
Teesside Demons	6	4	2	0	25	34	0.750	Qualified for Playoffs
Leicester Lemmings	6	1	5	0	33	63	0.167	
Manchester MPs	6	1	5	0	19	97	0.167	

== Playoffs ==
Semi-Finals
N1	Hull Sharks	26
Sc2	Stirling Clansmen	6
N2	Teesside Demons	L
Sc1	Newcastle Scholars	W

College Bowl I
Hull Sharks	23
Newcastle Scholars	6

Note - the table does not indicate who played home or away in each fixture.
