= 1987–88 British Collegiate American Football League =

The 1987–88 BCAFL was the third full season of the British Collegiate American Football League, organised by the British Students American Football Association.

== Changes from last season ==
=== Division changes ===
- A third Conference (Southern) was added.

=== Team changes ===
- Cardiff University joined the Southern Conference, playing as the Cobras
- University of East Anglia joined the Southern Conference, playing as the Pirates
- Leicester Lemmings moved from Northern to Southern Conference
- Newcastle Scholars moved from Scottish to Northern Conference
- University of Reading joined the Southern Conference, playing as the Knights

This increased the number of teams playing to 11

== Regular season ==
Locations of Scottish teams in BCAFL 1987-88
Locations of English and Welsh teams in BCAFL 1987-88

=== Scottish Conference ===
Team	Pld	Won	Lst	Drw	PF	PA	Win%	
Stirling Clansmen	6	5	1	0	150	76	0.833	Qualified for Playoffs
Strathclyde Hawks	6	4	2	0	129	84	0.667	Qualified for Playoffs
Glasgow Tigers	6	0	6	0	18	137	0.000	

=== Northern Conference ===
Team	Pld	Won	Lst	Drw	PF	PA	Win%	
Hull Sharks	6	6	0	0	123	12	1.000	Qualified for Playoffs
Manchester MPs	6	2	2	2	2	42	0.500	Withdrew after this season
Newcastle Scholars	6	2	4	0	50	10	0.333	
Teesside Demons	6	0	4	2	18	129	0.167	

=== Southern Conference ===
Team	Pld	Won	Lst	Drw	PF	PA	Win%	
Cardiff Cobras	6	5	0	1	109	13	0.917	Qualified for Playoffs
Leicester Lemmings	6	4	2	0	63	57	0.667	
UEA Pirates	6	2	3	1	2	64	0.417	
Reading Knights	6	0	6	0	0	40	0.000	

== Playoffs ==
Semi-finals
N1	Hull Sharks	22
Sc2	Strathclyde Hawks	0
Sc1	Stirling Clansmen	6
S1	Cardiff Cobras	22

College Bowl II
Hull Sharks (Note 1)	0
Cardiff Cobras	0

- Note 1 - the title was shared, as the final was still tied after three periods of Overtime.
- Note 2 - the table does not indicate who played home or away in each fixture.
