= 1992–93 British Collegiate American Football League =

The 1992–93 BCAFL was the eighth full season of the British Collegiate American Football League, organised by the British Students American Football Association.

== Changes from last season ==
Division Changes
There were no changes to the Divisional setup.

Team Changes

- Aberystwyth University joined the Southern Conference, as the Tarannau
- University of Bath joined the Southern Conference, as the Killer Bees
- Newcastle Mariners rejoined the Northern Conference after a 1-season gap
- Staffordshire University joined the Southern Conference, as the Stallions
- University of Sunderland joined the Northern Conference, as the Wearwolves
- University of the West of England joined the Southern Conference, as the Bristol Bullets

This increased the number of teams in BCAFL to 26.

== Regular season ==
Locations of Scottish teams in BCAFL 1992–93
Locations of English and Welsh teams in BCAFL 1992–93

=== Northern Conference ===
| Team | Pld | Won | Lst | Drw | PF | PA | Win% | |
|---|---|---|---|---|---|---|---|---|
| Glasgow Tigers | 8 | 8 | 0 | 0 | 174 | 28 | 1.000 | Qualified for Playoffs |
| Leeds Celtics | 8 | 7 | 0 | 1 | 166 | 45 | 0.938 | Qualified for Playoffs |
| Sheffield Zulus | 8 | 5 | 2 | 1 | 107 | 62 | 0.688 | Qualified for Playoffs |
| Strathclyde Hawks | 8 | 5 | 3 | 0 | 53 | 56 | 0.625 | Qualified for Playoffs |
| Paisley Panthers | 8 | 3 | 3 | 2 | 122 | 96 | 0.500 | |
| Lancaster Bombers | 8 | 3 | 4 | 1 | 39 | 84 | 0.438 | |
| Teesside Demons | 8 | 3 | 5 | 0 | 81 | 122 | 0.375 | |
| Hull Sharks | 8 | 3 | 5 | 0 | 45 | 65 | 0.375 | |
| Sunderland Wearwolves | 8 | 2 | 5 | 1 | 42 | 100 | 0.312 | |
| Stirling Clansmen | 8 | 1 | 6 | 1 | 33 | 134 | 0.188 | |
| Newcastle Mariners | 8 | 0 | 7 | 1 | 14 | 84 | 0.062 | |

=== Southern Conference ===
| Team | Pld | Won | Lst | Drw | PF | PA | Win% | |
|---|---|---|---|---|---|---|---|---|
| Southampton Stags | 8 | 7 | 0 | 1 | 367 | 0 | 0.938 | Qualified for Playoffs |
| Cambridge Pythons | 8 | 7 | 1 | 0 | 201 | 50 | 0.875 | Qualified for Playoffs |
| Cardiff Cobras | 8 | 6 | 1 | 1 | 125 | 74 | 0.812 | Qualified for Playoffs |
| Loughborough Aces | 8 | 6 | 2 | 0 | 143 | 54 | 0.750 | Qualified for Playoffs |
| Leicester Lemmings | 8 | 6 | 2 | 0 | 154 | 74 | 0.750 | |
| Tarannau Aberystwyth | 8 | 5 | 3 | 0 | 113 | 54 | 0.625 | |
| UEA Pirates | 8 | 5 | 3 | 0 | 123 | 87 | 0.625 | |
| Bath Killer Bees | 8 | 3 | 4 | 1 | 61 | 128 | 0.438 | |
| Staffordshire Stallions | 8 | 3 | 5 | 0 | 51 | 126 | 0.375 | |
| Aston Rhinos | 8 | 2 | 5 | 1 | 29 | 130 | 0.312 | |
| Reading Knights | 8 | 2 | 5 | 1 | 38 | 232 | 0.312 | |
| Oxford Cavaliers | 8 | 2 | 6 | 0 | 46 | 148 | 0.250 | |
| Birmingham Lions | 8 | 1 | 5 | 2 | 50 | tbc | 0.250 | |
| Bristol Bullets | 8 | 1 | 7 | 0 | 20 | 256 | 0.125 | |
| Warwick Wolves | 8 | 0 | 7 | 1 | 20 | 123 | 0.062 | |

== Playoffs ==
Quarter-finals
S1 | Southampton Stags | 32
S4 | Loughborough Aces | 7
S3 | Cardiff Cobras | 6
S2 | Cambridge Pythons | 8
N1 | Glasgow Tigers | 22
N4 | Strathclyde Hawks | 0
N3 | Sheffield Zulus | 12
N2 | Leeds Celtics | 42

Semi-finals
Southampton Stags | 14
Cambridge Pythons | 8
Glasgow Tigers | 14
Leeds Celtics | 36

College Bowl VII
Southampton Stags | 19
Leeds Celtics | 0

- Note – the table does not indicate who played home or away in each fixture.
