= 1985–86 British Collegiate American Football League =

The 1985–86 BCAFL was the 1st full season of the British Collegiate American Football League, organised by the British Students American Football Association.

For this initial season, four 'charter' Universities competed in a straight double round-robin schedule, without end-of-season playoffs.

- University of Hull, playing as the Sharks
- University of Manchester, playing as the MPs
- Newcastle University, playing as the Scholars
- Teesside University, playing as the Demons

== Regular season ==
Locations of teams in BCAFL 1985-86

Team	Pld	Won	Lst	Drw	PF	PA	Win%
Hull Sharks	5	5	0	0	tbc	tbc	1.000
Teesside Demons	5	3	2	0	tbc	tbc	0.600
Newcastle Scholars	3	1	2	0	tbc	tbc	0.333
Manchester MPs	5	0	5	0	tbc	tbc	0.000

Owing to Manchester being unable to fulfill their schedule, the season ended early.
