= 1990–91 British Collegiate American Football League =

The 1990–91 BCAFL was the sixth full season of the British Collegiate American Football League, organised by the British Students American Football Association.

== Changes from last season ==
Division Changes

- The four Conferences was merged into two (Northern & Southern)

Team Changes

- Aston University joined the Southern Conference, as the Rhinos
- University of Cambridge joined the Southern Conference, as the Pythons
- University of Leeds joined the Northern Conference, as the Celtics
- Newcastle Scholars changed their name to Newcastle Mariners
- Sheffield Pirates changed their name to Sheffield Zulus

This increased the number of teams in BCAFL to 19.

== Regular season ==
Locations of Scottish teams in BCAFL 1990–91
Locations of English and Welsh teams in BCAFL 1990–91

=== Northern Conference ===
| Team | Pld | Won | Lst | Drw | PF | PA | Win% | |
|---|---|---|---|---|---|---|---|---|
| Teesside Demons | 8 | 7 | 0 | 1 | 102 | 40 | 0.938 | Qualified for Playoffs |
| Strathclyde Hawks | 8 | 6 | 0 | 2 | 99 | 26 | 0.750 | Qualified for Playoffs |
| Leeds Celtics | 8 | 5 | 2 | 1 | 104 | 101 | 0.688 | Qualified for Playoffs |
| Hull Sharks | 8 | 3 | 2 | 3 | 64 | 60 | 0.562 | |
| Glasgow Tigers | 8 | 3 | 3 | 2 | 91 | 53 | 0.500 | |
| Paisley Panthers | 8 | 3 | 4 | 1 | 14 | 130 | 0.438 | |
| Sheffield Zulus | 8 | 2 | 5 | 1 | 22 | 67 | 0.312 | |
| Stirling Clansmen | 8 | 1 | 6 | 1 | 70 | 80 | 0.188 | |
| Newcastle Mariners | 8 | 0 | 8 | 0 | 0 | 8 | 0.000 | Withdrew after this season |

=== Southern Conference ===
| Team | Pld | Won | Lst | Drw | PF | PA | Win% | |
|---|---|---|---|---|---|---|---|---|
| UEA Pirates | 8 | 7 | 1 | 0 | 181 | 32 | 0.875 | Qualified for Playoffs |
| Warwick Wolves | 8 | 5 | 1 | 2 | 117 | 18 | 0.750 | Qualified for Playoffs |
| Leicester Lemmings | 8 | 5 | 2 | 1 | 176 | 65 | 0.688 | Qualified for Playoffs |
| Birmingham Lions | 8 | 4 | 2 | 2 | 101 | 72 | 0.625 | |
| Cardiff Cobras | 8 | 4 | 2 | 2 | 108 | 66 | 0.625 | |
| Southampton Stags | 8 | 4 | 3 | 1 | 118 | 54 | 0.562 | |
| Loughborough Aces | 8 | 4 | 3 | 1 | 177 | 68 | 0.562 | |
| Cambridge Pythons | 8 | 1 | 6 | 1 | 15 | 298 | 0.188 | |
| Reading Knights | 8 | 1 | 7 | 0 | 32 | 96 | 0.125 | |
| Aston Rhinos | 8 | 0 | 8 | 0 | 26 | 282 | 0.000 | |

== Playoffs ==
Wild Card
S2 | Warwick Wolves | 6
S3 | Leicester Lemmings | 30
N3 | Leeds Celtics | 15
N2 | Strathclyde Hawks | 13

Semi-finals
N1 | Teesside Demons | 43
Leicester Lemmings | 6
Leeds Celtics | 6
S1 | UEA Pirates | 26

College Bowl V
Teesside Demons | 19
UEA Pirates | 0

- Note – the table does not indicate who played home or away in each fixture.
