= British American Football Referees' Association =

Organisation

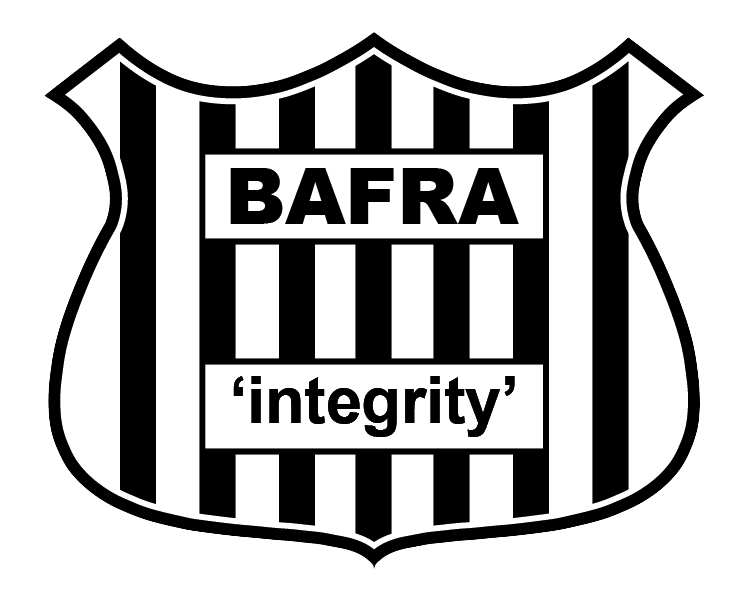
Logo of BAFRA

The British American Football Referees' Association (BAFRA) is the organisational body for American Football Referees in Britain. BAFRA is affiliated to the British American Football Association.

BAFRA was established in 1984 and provides game officials for American Football games played in the British Leagues. BAFRA officials are eligible to officiate in International Federation of American Football fixtures if selected to do so and in recent years BAFRA has provided personnel for the chain crews at NFL International Series games played at Wembley Stadium.

A typical BAFRA crew at South Leeds Stadium

== Association Governance ==
There 8 Board Directors of BAFRA meeting formally four times per year plus several working committees are convened during the year as required. The association has five stated objectives:

1. To improve the standard of officiating by training and examination, and by any other means
2. To enable all American football games in Britain to have neutral officials
3. To promote and uphold the status of officials both collectively and individually
4. To co-operate and to cultivate good relations with all bodies concerned with American football, for the betterment of the game
5. To take such action or make such representation as an Association, or in conjunction with others as may be considered desirable, in the interests of American football in Britain in general or for the benefit of officials and officiating in particular

== Training ==
The Director of Training is responsible for the oversight of training and development of officials under BAFRA. Training includes both formal seminars and presentations provided at The Annual Convention (typically in March or April), plus regional events for all levels.

Initial Training

During the initial associate training programme, all new officials are partnered with an experienced official (a Mentor). Training is typically delivered using an online programme of modules, going through the basic rules and mechanics of officiating. However, the Mentor may instead provide 1-to-1 training for new officials for whom the online module training isn't suited or the timings do not work. Once new officials have passed a simple 25-question competency test, they will be able to move to their on-field training.

This on-field experience is gathered over a minimum of 10 competitive games, where various aspects of what they have learned are tested and developed. The Mentor, Crew Chief (usually the Referee or "White Hat"), and other officials provide feedback during this process. Both the theoretical and practical performance of the new official is assessed throughout these games and, when a suitable standard is met, the Director of Training will promote the new official to the status of "Qualified".

Elite Program and Training

Each year BAFRA Selection Committee identify a panel of approximately 25 of the highest performing officials for the Elite Programme who are then assigned to the most prestigious competitive games in UK including Britbowl, BUCS Premier League Finals and may be promoted to IFAF level officials.

== The John Slavin Trophy ==
John Slavin was a long-serving BAFRA official and also a director of the association, who died in October 2005. In his memory BAFRA dedicated an annual award to be made to any UK team that shows commitment to improving the game experience for players and fans, as well as officials. The criteria for the award is decided at the start of each season by the rules committee to reflect varying aspects of game management that would benefit from improvement.

A full list of National winners of the trophy may be found at: https://www.bafra.info/info/jst/index.php

== Officials Awards ==
Since 2015, annual awards have been made to the Official of the Year and the Upcoming Official of the Year (called the Alan Wilson Award). A list of winners and the criteria applied may be found on the BAFRA website.

== Weekly newsletter ==
Within its website BAFRA publishes an open weekly online newsletter called Newsflash that includes items of interest, notices of appointment, game reports, disciplinary decisions and any rule changes. Whilst the purpose of Newsflash is primarily to inform BAFRA members, it is made available to the general public via the BAFRA website.

== Social Media Channels ==
Facebook

Instagram

LinkedIn

Twitter

YouTube
