= 2001–02 British Collegiate American Football League =

The 2001–02 BCAFL was the 17th full season of the British Collegiate American Football League, organised by the British Students American Football Association.

== Changes from last season ==
Division Changes
There were no changes to the Divisional setup

Team Changes

- Bristol Bullets changed their name to David Chorley Bullets
- University of Essex joined the Southern Conference, as the Blades
- Plymouth University joined the Southern Conference, as the Blitz
- Reading Knights moved within the Southern Conference from Western to Central Division

This increased the number of teams in BCAFL to 29.

== Regular season ==
Locations of Scottish teams in BCAFL 2001–02
Locations of English and Welsh teams in BCAFL 2001–02

=== Northern Conference, Scottish Division ===
Team	Pld	Won	Lst	Drw	PF	PA	Win%	
Stirling Clansmen	8	7	1	0	259	92	0.875	Qualified for Playoffs
Glasgow Tigers	8	6	2	0	226	94	0.750	Qualified for Playoffs
Strathclyde Hawks	8	2	4	2	118	126	0.357	Withdrew after this season
Lancaster Bombers	8	1	6	1	82	223	0.214	

=== Northern Conference, Eastern Division ===
Team	Pld	Won	Lst	Drw	PF	PA	Win%	
Hull Sharks	8	7	1	0	155	94	0.875	Qualified for Playoff
Sheffield Sabres	8	5	3	0	130	120	0.625	Qualified for Playoffs
Teesside Cougars	8	3	5	0	188	130	0.375	
Newcastle Mariners	8	1	6	1	19	224	0.188	
Leeds Celtics	8	1	7	0	66	202	0.125	

=== Northern Conference, Central Division ===
Team	Pld	Won	Lst	Drw	PF	PA	Win%	
Loughborough Aces	8	7	1	0	240	66	0.875	Qualified for Playoffs
Staffordshire Stallions	7	4	2	1	152	104	0.643	Qualified for Playoffs
Leicester Lemmings	8	4	3	1	130	76	0.563	
Nottingham Outlaws	8	3	5	0	64	150	0.375	
Derby Braves	8	3	5	0	76	128	0.375	

=== Southern Conference, Eastern Division ===
Team	Pld	Won	Lst	Drw	PF	PA	Win%	
Surrey Stingers	8	8	0	0	223	69	1.000	Qualified for Playoffs
Hertfordshire Hurricanes	8	4	3	1	141	97	0.571	Qualified for Playoffs
UEA Pirates	8	4	4	0	88	129	0.500	
Kent Falcons	8	3	5	0	82	93	0.375	
Essex Blades	8	0	7	1	24	167	0.062	

=== Southern Conference, Central Division ===
Team	Pld	Won	Lst	Drw	PF	PA	Win%	
Oxford Cavaliers	8	6	1	1	144	52	0.812	Qualified for Playoffs
Birmingham Lions	7	5	2	0	151	56	0.714	Qualified for Playoffs
Tarannau Aberystwyth	8	4	4	0	192	115	0.500	
Warwick Wolves	7	2	5	0	67	150	0.296	
Reading Knights	7	0	7	0	22	225	0.000	

=== Southern Conference, Western Division ===
Team	Pld	Won	Lst	Drw	PF	PA	Win%	
David Chorley Bullets	8	7	0	1	145	78	0.938	Qualified for Playoffs
Southampton Stags	8	4	4	0	104	106	0.500	Qualified for Playoffs
Bath Killer Bees	8	3	3	2	127	90	0.500	
Plymouth Blitz	8	2	6	0	62	175	0.250	
Cardiff Cobras	8	1	6	1	60	106	0.188	

== Playoffs ==
Wild Cards
N.C2	Staffordshire Stallions	6
N.S2	Glasgow Tigers	28
N.S1	Stirling Clansmen	18
N.E2	Sheffield Sabres	13
S.E2	Herts. Hurricanes	12
S.C2	Birmingham Lions	6
S.W2	Southampton Stags	0
S.C1	Oxford Cavaliers	16

Quarter-finals
N.C1	Loughborough Aces	40
Glasgow Tigers	0
Stirling Clansmen	0
N.E1	Hull Sharks	13
Herts. Hurricanes	34
S.E1	Surrey Stingers	27
S.W1	David Chorley Bullets	0
Oxford Cavaliers	16

Semi-finals
Loughborough Aces	38
Hull Sharks	13
Herts. Hurricanes	9
Oxford Cavailers	14

College Bowl XVI
Loughborough Aces	39
Oxford Cavaliers	22

- Note – the table does not indicate who played home or away in each fixture.
