= British American Football Association =

Governing body for American football in the United Kingdom

- Formation: 1985
- Headquarters: Kidderminster, Worcestershire, England
- Chairman: Nichole McCulloch
- Key people: Ian Deakin, Bruce Leatherman, Pete Ackerley, Richard Watson, Kenny Bello, Ian Deakin, Heather Smith.
- Website: britishamericanfootball.org

The British American Football Association (BAFA) is the national governing body for the sport of American football and non-contact Flag football in the United Kingdom since 1985. It is affiliated to the International Federation of American Football (IFAF). In 2010, they formed the BAFA National Leagues as the country's primary competition for contact football. Their flagship event is the annual Britbowl which is competed by the top two sides of the BAFANL Premier Divisions.

In 2023 the organization began a partnership with the National Football League to promote flag football. The partnership will "accelerate the delivery and participation of Flag Football at all levels of the game."

== Competitions ==
=== Adult ===
League	Code	Teams	Participants	Notes
BAFA National Leagues (BAFANL)	Adult Contact Football	70	Men/Women 18+	Winning teams play in the Britbowl
National Women's Football League (NWFL)	Women's Contact Football	17	Women 18+	
British Universities American Football League (BUAFL)	Adult Contact Football	81	University Students 18+	
National Flag Football League	Adult Flag Football	75	Men/Women 16+	
Women's Flag Football League	Women's Flag Football	17	Women/Female University Students 18+	League features both Club and University sides

=== Youth ===
League	Code	Teams	Participants	Notes
U19's League	Youth Contact Football	38	Youths 16–19	Winning teams play in the Junior Britbowl
U16's League	Youth Contact Football	41	Youths 13–16	Winning teams play in the Junior Britbowl
U17's Flag League	Youth Flag Football	22 (2025)	Youths 14–16	
U14's Flag League	Youth Flag Football	25 (2025)	Youths 11–13	
U11's Flag League	Youth Flag Football	22 (2025)	Youths 8–12	

2025 BAFA National Youth Flag finals

Under 17s
South Coast Spitfires (Red)	19	47	Lancashire Bombers

Under 14s
Glasgow Hornets	18	27	Northants Ducks (Black)

Under 11s
Fruit Bats (Red)	33	7	Northants Ducks (Black)

==== Final standings ====
2025 Standings
U17s	U14s	U11s
1. Lancashire Bombers	1. Northants Ducks (Black)	1. Fruit Bats (Red)
2. South Coast Spitfires (Red)	2. Glasgow Hornets	2. Northants Ducks (Black)
3. Hinchinbrooke Hunters	3. Solent Red Storm	3. Solent Red Storm
4. Fife Allstars	4. Nuneaton Jaguars	4. South Coast Spitfires
5. Kent Exiles	5. Fruit Bats (Red)	5. Burnley Tornadoes
6. Burnley Tornadoes	6. South Coast Spitfires (Red)	6. Sheffield Giants

== Member bodies ==
=== Current ===
- BAFCA (British American Football Coaches Association)
- BAFRA (British American Football Referees Association)
- BUAFL (British Universities American Football League)

=== Defunct ===
- BAFL (British American Football League) - split from BAFA in 2010, and ceased operations in the same year.
- BYAFA (British Youth American Football Association) - dissolved 2007 and merged into BAFL
- BSAFA (British Students American Football Association) - Disaffiliated 2007 leading to the foundation, by BAFA, of the BUAFL.
- SGA (Scottish Gridiron Association)

== Boards of directors ==
Role	Name
Chairman	Nichole McCulloch
Senior Non-Executive Director	Ian Deakin
Chief Executive Officer	Pete Ackerley
Director	Bruce Leatherman
Director	Richard Watson
Non-Executive Director	Colin Allen
Non-Executive Director	Kenny Bello
Non-Executive Director	Heather Smith
