= Glasgow Tigers (American football) =

American football team based in the United Kingdom

- Founded: 1986; 40 years ago
- League: BAFA National Leagues
- Division: NFC 1 Scotland
- Team history: Strathclyde Sheriffs (1986–2002); Glasgow Tigers (2002–)
- Location: Glasgow, Scotland
- Stadium: Clydebank Community Sports Hub
- Colours: Black / Orange Helmets; Orange and Black Jerseys; Black Pants
- Division titles: 5: (1988 ,1990, 2009, 2024 2025)
- Playoff berths: 10: (1988, 1990, 1996, 2002, 2004, 2009, 2016, 2023, 2024 2025)

The Glasgow Tigers, formerly known as the Strathclyde Sheriffs, are an American football club based in Glasgow, Scotland, who compete in the BAFA National Leagues NFC 1 Scotland.

== History ==
The Glasgow Tigers were founded in 1986 as the Strathclyde Sheriffs. The team was undefeated in the 1988 season. The team renamed to the Tigers in 2002 and won a division title in 2009. The team established a youth programme called the Glasgow Tigers Academy in 2017. The 2020 season was cancelled due to the COVID-19 pandemic in the United Kingdom.
