= British Collegiate American Football League =

BCAFL Logo

The British Collegiate American Football League (BCAFL) was an American football league consisting of players from various colleges and universities in the United Kingdom.

In 2007 it was succeeded by the British Universities American Football League.

The league officially began in the 1985–86 season with four teams, with founder members Newcastle Skolars, led by Mike Rea, and Hull University, and celebrated its 20th anniversary with 37 teams competing in the 2005–06 campaign. The final season was contested by 39 teams, with some teams consisting of players from more than one institution.

Throughout its existence, BCAFL was plagued by the fact that some of its teams played at a vastly higher skill level than others. During its final years the British Student American Football Association (BSAFA), who was responsible for the operations of BCAFL, made great strides towards competitive balance; increasing the skill level on the field and expanding the game throughout the UK. However, after extended public disagreements with the policies of the governing body of the British American Football Association (BAFA), the BAFA dissolved the BSAFA with all the teams being forced to transfer to the new British university American Football League (BUAFL).

== Rules ==
BCAFL largely followed the rules of American college football (though there were restrictions on the number of North American players allowed on the field at any one time). As opposed to the conference and "bowl game" set-up used in American college football BCAFL divided itself into two conferences and used a season-ending playoff system, similar to the NFL (however, below the Bowl Subdivision of Division I, the NCAA uses a season-ending playoff system to crown national champions). At the end of an 8-game regular season, 16 teams would advance to the playoffs (the playoffs expanded from 12 to 16 teams in the 2004–2005 season), with the 4 division champions and 4 "wild card" teams from each conference participating. The playoffs culminated with a championship game, called the "College Bowl" which features the champions of the Northern and Southern Conferences.

== Teams ==
=== Full Member records ===
Teams are listed within their divisions, with their all-time regular season record listed (records include ONLY official BCAFL regular season games through the 2006–07 season, as recorded in the BCAFL official all-time records).

Team	Conference	Division	W	L	T	Winning Pct.	Division Champ.	Conference Champ.	BCAFL Champ.
Caledonian Roughriders	Northern	Scottish	10	21	1	.328	0	0	0
Edinburgh Timberwolves	Northern	Scottish	10	14	0	.417	0	0	0
Glasgow Tigers	Northern	Scottish	92	55	13	.616	9	3	1
Paisley Pyros	Northern	Scottish	20	60	6	.267	0	0	0
Stirling Clansmen	Northern	Scottish	67	70	15	.484	5	1	1
Leeds Celtics	Northern	Eastern	97	26	10	.767	7	3	1
Newcastle Raiders	Northern	Eastern	65	80	8	.451	1	1	0
Sunderland Kings	Northern	Eastern	19	72	5	.224	0	0	0
UT Cougars	Northern	Eastern	74	76	13	.494	6	3	2
UCH Sharks	Northern	Western	78	72	13	.518	5	3	4
Lancaster Bombers	Northern	Western	62	59	7	.512	2	0	0
Lincoln Colonials	Northern	Western	0	7	1	.063	0	0	0
Sheffield Sabres	Northern	Western	46	62	10	.432	1	0	0
Sheffield Hallam Warriors	Northern	Western	13	16	3	.453	1	0	0
Derby Braves	Northern	Central	31	52	3	.378	0	0	0
UEA Pirates	Northern	Central	77	75	5	.506	2	1	0
Leicester Longhorns	Northern	Central	67	87	9	.439	1	2	0
Loughborough Aces	Northern	Central	121	27	2	.813	12	6	3
Nottingham Outlaws	Northern	Central	44	43	1	.506	1	0	0
Tarannau Aberystwyth	Southern	Central	52	64	4	.450	3	1	0
Birmingham Lions	Southern	Central	93	41	10	.681	7	2	1
Oxford Cavaliers	Southern	Central	65	58	5	.527	4	2	1
Staffordshire Stallions	Southern	Central	63	47	10	.567	3	1	0
Warwick Wolves	Southern	Central	52	81	9	.398	1	0	0
ARU Phantoms	Southern	Eastern	2	30	0	.063	0	0	0
Essex Blades	Southern	Eastern	19	25	3	.436	1	0	0
Greenwich Mariners	Southern	Eastern	13	10	0	.565	1	0	0
Hertfordshire Hurricanes	Southern	Eastern	72	26	6	.721	7	5	4
Kent Falcons	Southern	Eastern	29	60	0	.326	0	0	0
Royal Holloway Vikings	Southern	Eastern	4	12	0	.250	0	0	0
Bath Killer Bees	Southern	Western	61	48	11	.554	3	0	0
Bristol Bullets	Southern	Western	46	61	13	.438	2	1	1
Cardiff Cobras	Southern	Western	103	41	14	.696	11	2	1
Plymouth Blitz	Southern	Western	14	32	2	.313	0	0	0
Brighton Tsunami	Southern	Southern	14	16	2	.469	0	0	0
Portsmouth Destroyers	Southern	Southern	1	6	1	.188	0	0	0
Reading Knights	Southern	Southern	27	121	8	.199	0	0	0
Southampton Stags	Southern	Southern	89	44	11	.656	5	3	3
Surrey Stingers	Southern	Southern	50	49	5	.505	2	0	0

=== Associate members ===
- Bristol Barracuda 2007/8
- Durham Saints 2007/8

=== Defunct Teams ===
- Aberdeen Steamroller (0–8–0, .000)
- Aston Rhinos (10–43–3, .205)
- Cambridge Pythons (38–16–2, .696)
- Dundee Bluedevils (1–7–0, .125)
- Manchester MPs (3–12–2, .235)
- Strathclyde Hawks (64–41–15, .596)

== BCAFL/College Bowl History ==
- 1986 – Hull Sharks (5–0)
- 1987 – College Bowl I: Hull Sharks def. Newcastle Scholars 23–6
- 1988 – CB II: Cardiff Cobras tie Hull Sharks 0–0 (declared Co-Champions)
- 1989 – CB III: Hull Sharks def. Cardiff Cobras 7–6
- 1990 – CB IV: Teesside Demons def. Birmingham Lions 21–20
- 1991 – CB V: Teesside Demons def. UEA Pirates 19–0
- 1992 – CB VI: Southampton Stags def. Glasgow Tigers 53–0
- 1993 – CB VII: Southampton Stags def. Leeds Celtics 19–0
- 1994 – CB VIII: Glasgow Tigers def. Leicester Lemmings 26–0
- 1995 – CB IX: Loughborough Aces def. Cambridge Pythons 23–20
- 1996 – CB X: Leeds Celtics def. Cardiff Cobras 14–8
- 1997 – CB XI: Loughborough Aces def. Tarannau Aberystwyth 28–19
- 1998 – CB XII: Hertfordshire Hurricanes def. Leeds Celtics 16–7
- 1999 – CB XIII: Hertfordshire Hurricanes def. Loughborough Aces 7–3
- 2000 – CB XIV: Hertfordshire Hurricanes def. Leicester Lemmings 20–6
- 2001 – CB XV: Oxford Cavaliers def. Loughborough Aces 26–23
- 2002 – CB XVI: Loughborough Aces def. Oxford Cavaliers 39–23
- 2003 – CB XVII: Stirling Clansmen def. Hertfordshire Hurricanes 22–17
- 2004 – CB XVIII: Hertfordshire Hurricanes def. Staffordshire Stallions 27–6
- 2005 – CB XIX: Birmingham Lions def. Glasgow Tigers 34–7
- 2006 – CB XX: Southampton Stags def. UT Cougars 79–8
- 2007 – CB XXI: Bristol Bullets def. Loughborough Aces 31–14

== 2006–07 season ==
=== Regular season ===
NC-Scottish
Team	W	L	T	PCT	PF	PA
y-Glasgow Tigers	5	3	0	.625	174	122
Caledonian Roughriders	4	3	1	.563	67	88
Edinburgh Timberwolves	3	5	0	.375	99	64
Stirling Clansmen	1	5	2	.250	1	73
Paisley Pyros	0	7	1	.063	26	173
NC-Eastern
Team	W	L	T	PCT	PF	PA
y-UT Cougars	6	1	1	.813	277	91
x-Newcastle Raiders	6	2	0	.750	189	119
x-Leeds Celtics	6	2	0	.750	299	96
Sunderland Kings	3	5	0	.375	53	179
NC-Western
Team	W	L	T	PCT	PF	PA
y-Sheffield Sabres	6	1	1	.813	137	18
x-Sheffield Hallam Warriors	4	2	2	.625	75	43
x-Lancaster Bombers	4	3	1	.563	84	135
UCH Sharks	1	5	2	.250	36	127
Lincoln Colonials	0	7	1	.063	6	172
NC-Central
Team	W	L	T	PCT	PF	PA
y-Loughborough Aces	7	0	1	.938	155	92
Derby Braves	3	3	2	.500	74	113
UEA Pirates	2	5	1	.313	82	99
Nottingham Outlaws	1	6	1	.188	87	161
Leicester Longhorns	1	6	1	.188	35	157

SC-Central
Team	W	L	T	PCT	PF	PA
y-Birmingham Lions	5	2	1	.688	124	103
Staffordshire Stallions	4	3	1	.563	99	89
Tarannau Aberystwyth	4	4	0	.500	112	102
Warwick Wolves	3	4	1	.438	126	75
Oxford Cavaliers	3	4	1	.438	52	121
SC-Eastern
Team	W	L	T	PCT	PF	PA
y-Essex Blades	8	0	0	1.000	245	33
x-Hertfordshire Hurricanes	5	3	0	.625	275	90
Greenwich Mariners	4	4	0	.500	166	130
Kent Falcons	4	4	0	.500	106	134
Royal Holloway Vikings	2	6	0	.250	105	272
ARU Phantoms	1	7	0	.125	62	257
SC-Western
Team	W	L	T	PCT	PF	PA
y-Bath Killer Bees	5	1	2	.750	155	90
x-Cardiff Cobras	5	2	1	.688	113	80
x-Bristol Bullets	4	2	2	.625	192	89
Plymouth Blitz	2	4	2	.375	48	128
SC-Southern
Team	W	L	T	PCT	PF	PA
y-Southampton Stags	7	0	1	.938	279	46
x-Brighton Tsunami	4	3	1	.563	126	95
Surrey Stingers	3	5	0	.375	105	174
Reading Knights	3	5	0	.375	82	120
Portsmouth Destroyers	1	6	1	.188	34	214

- y – Clinched Division Title
- x – Clinched Playoff Berth

=== Playoffs ===
Wild Card Round	Divisional Round
1	Loughborough Aces	45
8	Lancaster Bombers	0
1	Loughborough Aces	16
6	Leeds Celtics	0
3	Sheffield Sabres	0
6	Leeds Celtics	13
Northern Conference
2	UT Cougars	26
7	Sheffield Hallam Warriors	12
2	UT Cougars	26
5	Newcastle Raiders	20
4	Glasgow Tigers	12
5	Newcastle Raiders	28
1	Essex Blades	21
8	Brighton Tsunami	6
1	Essex Blades	6
6	Bristol Bullets	43
3	Bath Killer Bees	10
6	Bristol Bullets	30
Southern Conference
2	Southampton Stags	25
7	Hertfordshire Hurricanes	22
2	Southampton Stags	6
4	Birmingham Lions	13
4	Birmingham Lions	20
5	Cardiff Cobras	7

Conference Championships
1	Loughborough Aces	23
2	UT Cougars	18
6	Bristol Bullets	21
4	Birmingham Lions	14

College Bowl XXI
N1	Loughborough Aces	14
S6	Bristol Bullets	31

== All-star game ==
Each season BCAFL held an All-Star game between the Northern Conference Cougars and the Southern Conference Wildcats. Trials for these All-Star teams are open to all players in the league. Along with the accolades of competing for their conference, All-Star players are also eligible to try out for the Great Britain Bulldogs, a national college team that competes with North American and other European American football national teams.
