= Ostend Pirates =

General information
- Founded: 2012
- Stadium: De Schorre, Ostend
- Headquartered: Ostend

League / conference affiliations
- Belgian Football League; Flemish American Football League

Championships
- League championships: 0; 8 (2000, 2001, 2006, 2007, 2008, 2009, 2010, 2011, 2016, 2023)
- Division championships: 0; 6 (2006, 2007, 2008, 2009, 2010, 2011)

Current uniform
Home

Away

The Ostend Pirates are an American football team based in Ostend. The Pirates are currently members of the Flemish American Football League (FAFL) conference in the Belgian Football League (BFL).

== History ==
=== Ostend Tigers ===
The original team were the Ostend Tigers. They merged with the Izegem Redskins to form the West Flanders Tribes.

=== West Flanders Tribes (2001–2012) ===
The team is the continuation of the former West Flanders Tribes which split up into the Ostend Pirates and the Izegem Tribes.

=== 2014 season ===
The Pirates started off their first season very strong. Ostend won their first match-up against their former West Flanders Tribes teammates from Izegem Tribes with an 8-12 score. They finished in the semi-finals against the Ghent Gators who would win the Belgian Bowl.

FAFL 2014 Standings
	W	L	T	PCT	PF	PA	STK
Ghent Gators	7	1	0	.875	288	65	W2
Brussels Black Angels	7	1	0	.875	226	66	W7
Ostend Pirates	6	2	0	.750	196	84	W4
Brussels Bulls	5	3	0	.625	158	73	W2
Leuven Lions	4	4	0	.500	148	138	W1
Puurs Titans	3	5	0	.375	84	219	L3
Limburg Shotguns	2	5	1	.313	80	208	L2
Izegem Tribes	1	6	1	.188	90	203	L3
Antwerp Diamonds	0	8	0	.000	51	265	L8

2014 Playoffs

Quarterfinals; June 8, 2014 @Grez-Doiceau @Anderlecht
2	Grez-Doiceau Fighting Turtles	22
3	Ostend Pirates	30
2	Brussels Black Angels	52
3	Liège Monarchs	12

Semifinals; June 15, 2014 @Gent @Evere
1	Ghent Gators	16
3	Ostend Pirates	14
1	Brussels Tigers	7
2	Brussels Black Angels	3

Belgian Bowl XXVII; June 29, 2014 @ Izegem
1	Ghent Gators	38
1	Brussels Tigers	0

=== 2015 season ===
FAFL 2015 Standings
	W	L	T	PCT	PF	PA	STK
Brussels Black Angels	7	0	0	1.00	295		W7
Ghent Gators	6	1	0	0.857	216		L1
Ostend Pirates	5	2	0	.714	187		
Izegem Tribes	4	3	0	.571	114		
Antwerp Diamonds	2	5	0	.286	68		
Leuven Lions	2	5	0	.167	84		W
Limburg Shotguns	1	6	0	.143	85		L
Puurs Titans	1	6	0	.143	71		

2015 Playoffs

Quarterfinals; June 7th, 2015
2	Liège Monarchs	12
3	Ostend Pirates	22
2	Ghent Gators	22
3	Waterloo Warriors	24

Semifinals; June 14th, 2015
1	Brussels Black Angels	14
3	Ostend Pirates	6
1	Brussels Tigers	56
3	Waterloo Warriors	14

Belgian Bowl XXVIII; June 27th, 2015 @ Sint-Niklaas
1	Brussels Tigers	8
1	Brussels Black Angels	13
