= Izegem Tribes =

General information
- Founded: 1989
- Stadium: Sint-Jorisstraat 63 Izegem
- Headquartered: Izegem

League / conference affiliations
- Belgian Football League; Flemish American Football League

Championships
- League championships: 8; 2000, 2001, 2006, 2007, 2008, 2009, 2010, 2011
- Division championships: 6; 2006, 2007, 2008, 2009, 2010, 2011

Current uniform
Home

Away

The Izegem Tribes are a Belgian American football team based in Izegem. The Tribes are members of the Flemish American Football League (FAFL) conference in the Belgian Football League (BFL). Their team colours are maroon, white and black.

== History ==
The team is the continuation of the former West Flanders Tribes which split up into the Ostend Pirates and the Izegem Tribes.

=== 2013 season ===
FFL 2013 Standings
	W	L	T	PCT	PF	PA	STK
Brussels Bulls	6	0	0	1.00	178	14	W6
Brussels Black Angels	5	1	0	.833	127	29	W3
Puurs Titans	3	2	0	.600	81	54	W1
Leuven Lions	2	3	1	.417	56	96	L2
Antwerp Diamonds	1	3	1	.300	49	105	T1
Ghent Gators	1	4	1	.250	46	126	L2
Izegem Tribes	0	5	1	.083	49	162	T1

=== 2014 season ===
FAFL 2014 Standings
	W	L	T	PCT	PF	PA	STK
Ghent Gators	7	1	0	.875	288	65	W2
Brussels Black Angels	7	1	0	.875	226	66	W7
Ostend Pirates	6	2	0	.750	196	84	W4
Brussels Bulls	5	3	0	.625	158	73	W2
Leuven Lions	4	4	0	.500	148	138	W1
Puurs Titans	3	5	0	.375	84	219	L3
Limburg Shotguns	2	5	1	.313	80	208	L2
Izegem Tribes	1	6	1	.188	90	203	L3
Antwerp Diamonds	0	8	0	.000	51	265	L8

=== 2015 season ===
FAFL 2015 Standings
	W	L	T	PCT	PF	PA	STK
Brussels Black Angels	7	0	0	1.00	295		W7
Ghent Gators	6	1	0	0.857	216		L1
Ostend Pirates	5	2	0	.714	187		
Izegem Tribes	4	3	0	.571	114		
Antwerp Diamonds	2	5	0	.286	68		
Leuven Lions	2	5	0	.167	84		W
Limburg Shotguns	1	6	0	.143	85		L
Puurs Titans	1	6	0	.143	71		
