= Travis Brody =

American football player (born 1984)

Profile
- Position: Quarterback

Personal information
- Born: March 14, 1984 (age 42)

Career information
- College: Occidental

Career history
- ?: Brussels Bulls
- 2009: Budapest Cowboys

Travis Brody (born March 14, 1984) is an American former football quarterback who played for the Brussels Bulls of the Belgian Football League (BFL). He attended Occidental College and Los Alamitos High School in California.

Brody grew up in Irvine, California. He currently resides in Brussels, Belgium.

In May 2009, Brody played for the Budapest Cowboys of the Central European Football League (CEFL).

== Playing career ==
=== High school and college ===
Brody played football, basketball and baseball, and also ran track and field at Los Alamitos High School. He played quarterback and receiver under head coach John Barnes. He is a former teammate of Mike Patterson, Keenan Howry, Antoine Cason, Bernard Riley, Chris Kluwe, and Jeremy Childs. He continued his playing career at Occidental College under head coach Dale Widolff. After playing at Occidental, Brody spent a few years away from competitive football.

=== Professional ===
He signed with the Brussels Bulls in December 2007, becoming the first import player in league history. After one season with the team, Brody and the Bulls signed a two-year extension through the 2010 season. Brody helped deliver the expansion Bulls their first victories in team history. He guided the Bulls to the brink of the BFL playoffs in 2009, falling 33–28 to the Bornem Titans in the final game of the season despite throwing three touchdown passes and zero interceptions in the loss.

Brody is characterized as a drop-back style quarterback, however he led the Bulls in rushing touchdowns during the 2008 and 2010 seasons. During the 2010 season, Brody rushed for two touchdowns in a 26–14 loss to the West Flanders Tribes and three touchdowns in a 35–14 win against the Limburg Shotguns.

After the conclusion of the 2009 season, Brody signed a one-game contract with the Budapest Cowboys.

=== Coaching career ===
Brody was an assistant coach for the Brussels Bulls Junior team that finished with a 14–1 overall record during the 2008 and 2009 seasons, including victory in the 2009 Junior Belgian Championship game.

He coached basketball during the 2009–2010 season at St. John's International School in Waterloo, Belgium.
