= 2001 BFL season =

- Total # of teams: 4 in division I
- Regular season: March 13
- Playoffs: May 20
- Belgian Bowl: Belgian Bowl XIV
- Belgian Bowl Date: June 3
- Belgian Bowl Location: Ghent
- Belgian Bowl Champions: Brussels Tigers

The 2001 season of the Belgian Football League (BFL) is the regular season played in the Belgium. The Izeghem Redskins won Belgian Bowl XIV against the Brussels Tigers by a score of 22-0.

== Regular season ==
=== Regular season standings ===
2001 BFL Division I Standings
Pos	Team	Pld	W	L	D	PF	PA	PD	PCT	STK
1	Izegem Redskins	5	5	0	0	76	29	+47	1.000	W5
2	Charleroi Cougars	5	3	2	0	74	45	+29	.600	
3	Liège Red Roosters	4	1	3	0	60	58	+2	.250	
4	Brussels Angels	4	0	4	0	12	90	−78	.000	L4

== Postseason ==
Belgian Bowl XIV
Izeghem Redskins (FFL)	Brussels Tigers (LFFAB)
22	0
	1	2	3	4	Total
WFT	0	0	0	22	22
BT	0	0	0	0	0
- Date: June 3, 2001
- Stadium: K.R.C. Gent-Zeehaven; Ghent

Wildcard round May 13, 2001 @ Liège
4	Brussels Angels	26
W	Antwerp Diamonds	6
3	Liège Red Roosters	0
W	Brussels Tigers	28

Semifinals; May 20, 2001 @ Waregem
1	Izegem Redskins	42
4	Brussels Angels	14
2	Charleroi Cougars	6
W	Brussels Tigers	20

Belgian Bowl XIV; June 3, 2001 @ Ghent
1	Izegem Redskins	22
W	Brussels Tigers	0
