= 2004 BFL season =

- Total # of teams: 10
- Regular season: February 22
- Playoffs: May 23
- Belgian Bowl: Belgian Bowl XVII
- Belgian Bowl Date: June 6
- Belgian Bowl Location: Charleroi
- Belgian Bowl Champions: Antwerp Diamonds

The 2004 season of the Belgian Football League (BFL) is the regular season played in the Belgium. The Antwerp Diamonds won Belgian Bowl XVII against the Leuven Lions by a score of 12–0.

== Regular season ==
=== Regular season standings ===
The top four teams of the regular season are seeded into playoffs for the Belgian Bowl.

BFL 2004 Standings
	W	L	T	PCT	PF	PA	STK
Antwerp Diamonds	8	0	0	1.00	306	0	W8
Leuven Lions	7	1	0	.875	161	43	
Brussels Black Angels	6	2	0	.750	143	46	
Charleroi Cougars	6	3	0	.667	75	115	
Liège Red Roosters	4	4	1	.444	92	161	
Tournai Phoenix	3	5	0	.375	101	94	
Flemalle Flames	3	5	1	.333	78	152	
West Flanders Tribes	2	5	1	.250	68	70	L1
Brussels Tigers	1	8	0	.111	12	177	
Ghent Gators	0	7	1	.000	32	207	

- clinched seed to the playoffs

== Post season ==
Belgian Bowl XVII
Leuven Lions (FFL)	Antwerp Diamonds (FFL)
0	12
	1	2	3	4	Total
LL	0	0	0	0	0
AD	0	0	6	6	12
- Date: June 6, 2004

Semifinals; May 23, 2004 @ Antwerp/Leuven
1	Antwerp Diamonds	20
4	Charleroi Cougars	10
2	Leuven Lions	31
3	Brussels Black Angels	20

Belgian Bowl XVII; June 6, 2004 @ Charleroi
1	Antwerp Diamonds	12
2	Leuven Lions	0
