= 2014 BFL season =

- Total # of teams: 15
- Playoffs: June 8, 2014
- Belgian Bowl: Belgian Bowl XXVII
- Belgian Bowl Date: June 29, 2014
- Belgian Bowl Location: Izegem, Belgium
- Belgian Bowl Champions: Ghent Gators
- FFL Champions: Ghent Gators
- LFFAB Champions: Brussels Tigers

The 2014 season of the Belgian Football League (BFL) is the regular season played in the Belgium. The championshipgame is the Belgian Bowl XXVII.

== Regular season ==
=== Regular season standings ===
FAFL 2014 Standings
	W	L	T	PCT	PF	PA	STK
Ghent Gators	7	1	0	.875	288	65	W2
Brussels Black Angels	7	1	0	.875	226	66	W7
Ostend Pirates	6	2	0	.750	196	84	W4
Brussels Bulls	5	3	0	.625	158	73	W2
Leuven Lions	4	4	0	.500	148	138	W1
Puurs Titans	3	5	0	.375	84	219	L3
Limburg Shotguns	2	5	1	.313	80	208	L2
Izegem Tribes	1	6	1	.188	90	203	L3
Antwerp Diamonds	0	8	0	.000	51	265	L8

LFFAB 2014 Standings
	W	L	T	PCT	PF	PA	STK
Brussels Tigers	5	0	0	1.00	212	26	W5
Grez-Doiceau Fighting Turtles	4	1	0	.800	159	68	W2
Liège Monarchs	3	2	0	.600	152	87	W1
Waterloo Warriors	2	3	0	.400	132	116	L3
Charleroi Coal Miners	1	4	0	.200	42	196	W1
Tournai Phoenix	0	5	0	.000	19	247	L4
Andenne Bears	-	-	-	-	-	-	-
Luxembourg Steelers	-	-	-	-	-	-	-

– clinched seed to the playoffs

== Postseason ==
Belgian Bowl XXVII
Brussels Tigers (LFFAB)	Ghent Gators (FAFL)
0	38
	1	2	3	4	Total
BT	0	0	0	0	0
GG	6	18	0	14	38
- Date: June 29
- Stadium: Stedelijk sportstadion Izegem; Izegem

The Belgian Bowl XXVII was held on June 29, 2014, in Izegem. The Ghent Gators won over the Brussels Tigers. It was the first time for the Ghent Gators to win the national trophy.

Quarterfinals; June 8, 2014 @Grez-Doiceau @Anderlecht
2	Grez-Doiceau Fighting Turtles	22
3	Ostend Pirates	30
2	Brussels Black Angels	52
3	Liège Monarchs	12

Semifinals; June 15, 2014 @Gent @Evere
1	Ghent Gators	16
3	Ostend Pirates	14
1	Brussels Tigers	7
2	Brussels Black Angels	3

Belgian Bowl XXVII; June 29, 2014 @ Izegem
1	Ghent Gators	38
1	Brussels Tigers	0
