= Belgian Bowl XII =

Izeghem Redskins (FFL)	Antwerp Diamonds (FFL)
6	41
	1	2	3	4	Total
IR	16	8	11	8	43
AD	0	0	0	6	6

The Belgian Bowl XII was played in 1999 and was won by the Antwerp Diamonds.
