= Antwerp Argonauts =

- Established: 2016
- Based in: Antwerp
- League: Belgian Football League
- Division: Flemish American Football League

The Antwerp Argonauts are an amateur American football team based in Antwerp. The Argonauts are since 2017 members of the Flemish American Football League (FAFL) conference in the Belgian Football League (BFL).

== History ==
The Antwerp Argonauts were founded 2016 by a merger of the Antwerp Diamonds and the Puurs Titans. They started in their first season 2016 in the second Flemish division. With a perfect season the got promoted to the Belgian Football League. 2018 the made it for the first time to the playoffs.
