= Ghent Gators =

American football team

General information
- Founded: 1999
- Stadium: RUSS Ghent / Blaarmeersen Ghent
- Headquartered: Ghent

League / conference affiliations
- Belgian Football League; Flemish American Football League

Championships
- League championships: 1; 2014
- Division championships: 1; 2014

Current uniform
Home

Away

The Ghent Gators are an American football team situated in Ghent. The team was established in 1999 by Craig Bailey, an American living in Belgium, through his local pizza delivery business. Along with 8 other Flemish teams, they are part of the Flemish American Football League (FAFL) conference in the Belgian Football League (BFL). They managed to qualify for the playoffs for the first time in their existence on May 18, 2014 and won their first Belgian championship on 29 June 2014 by beating the Brussels Tigers in Belgian Bowl XXVII.

== Current season ==
In 2018, the Gators took part in the Belgian second division. They were relegated after the 2016 despite finishing third in the first division due to a forfait in the final game of the season. After cruising through the second division with a record of 8-0 against Izegem Tribes, Leuven Lions and Waasland Wolves, they qualified for the FAFL Bowl. The game was played on 10 June 2018 against the 2nd best team in the division, the Izegem Tribes. After regulation, the score was 28-28 so it went into overtime. On the very first play of overtime, the Tribes managed to score a touchdown and the Gators were unable to respond. This means Izegem won the Flemish title and advanced to the promotion game where they lost to the Ostend Pirates.

=== Senior roster ===
Ghent Gators Senior Roster 2020
Quarterbacks: 4 Gilles Van Overschelde; 5 Robin Van Litsenborg; 18 Mathias Callebaut; Wide receivers: 3 Pauwel Depreitere; 7 Pieter-Jan Dhaese; 24 Kim Jolie; 80 Stephen Amant; 83 Thomas Lezy; 84 Senne Keuppens; 88 Frederik Ongenae; 89 Jona Dermul; Running backs: 1 Richard Mayango; 19 Jordi De Meyer; 32 Anton Bardyn; Offensive linemen: 53 Michiel Morel; 60 Matthias Van Gysegem; 65 Chato De Veirman; 69 Fettah Alioski; 76 Tom Ragaert	Defensive linemen: 13 Destiny Osegbe; 56 Alexander Van de Cotte; 77 Paolo Tokmaji; 91 Youri Maas; 94 Robert Skibicki; 99 D'Jim Verbanck; Linebackers: 33 Jorge Castrillo; 51 Kenzo Lannoo; 54 Simon Van der Sluys; 55 Rogier Depreitere; 58 Leonard Coremans; Defensive backs: 25 Timothy Buyle; 26 Andreas Van der Sluys; 27 Owen Engels; 30 Florian Steelant; 36 Willem Doms	Coaching staff: Head coach Roald Piqueur; Defensive Coordinator Roald Piqueur; Offensive Coordinator Pauwel Depreitere; Assistant Offensive Coordinator Jelle Van Melder; Running Backs coach Benoit Lagae; Defensive Line coach Sander De Gussem

== Performance ==
=== 2000–2004 ===
- clinched seed to the playoffs

BFL 2000 Standings
	W	L	T	PCT	PF	PA	STK
Izegem Redskins	7	1	0	.875	202	67	W7
Charleroi Cougars	6	2	0	.750	138	40	
Liège Red Roosters	3	5	0	.375	77	108	
Flemalle Flames	3	5	0	.375	52	186	
Brussels Tigers	2	6	0	.250	76	154	
Ghent Gators*	0	7	0	.000	57	256	

- (*) Ghent was removed from competition on April 14, 2000. All results were cancelled.

2000 Playoffs

Quarterfinals; May 7, 2000 @ Brussels
1	Izegem Redskins	20
5	Brussels Tigers	16
3	Liège Red Roosters	50
6	Ghent Gators (FF)	0

Semifinals; May 14, 2000 @ Izeghem
1	Izegem Redskins	34
4	Flemalle Flames	20
2	Charleroi Cougars	14
3	Liège Red Roosters	12

Belgian Bowl XIII; May 28, 2000 @ Izeghem
1	Izegem Redskins	28
2	Charleroi Cougars	0

BFL 2002 Standings
	W	L	T	PCT	PF	PA	STK
BFL West 2002 Standings
Antwerp Diamonds	8	0	0	1.00	286	24	W8
Tournai Phoenix	6	2	0	.750	184	78	
West Flanders Tribes	4	3	1	.500	146	90	W1
Ghent Gators	0	8	0	.000	6	299	L8
BFL East 2002 Standings
Brussels Tigers	6	2	0	.750	158	66	
Brussels Angels	4	3	1	.500	160	97	
Flemalle Flames	4	4	0	.500	202	162	
Charleroi Cougars	2	6	0	.250	124	194	
Liège Red Roosters	1	7	0	.125	40	302	

BFL 2004 Standings
	W	L	T	PCT	PF	PA	STK
Antwerp Diamonds	8	0	0	1.00	306	0	W8
Leuven Lions	7	1	0	.875	161	43	
Brussels Black Angels	6	2	0	.750	143	46	
Charleroi Cougars	6	3	0	.667	75	115	
Liège Red Roosters	4	4	1	.444	92	161	
Tournai Phoenix	3	5	0	.375	101	94	
Flemalle Flames	3	5	1	.333	78	152	
West Flanders Tribes	2	5	1	.250	68	70	L1
Brussels Tigers	1	8	0	.111	12	177	
Ghent Gators	0	7	1	.000	32	207	

=== 2006–2009 ===
FFL 2006 Standings
	W	L	T	PCT	PF	PA	STK
West Flanders Tribes	6	1	0	.857	175	75	L1
Brussels Black Angels	6	1	0	.857	199	39	
Antwerp Diamonds	5	2	0	.714			
Leuven Lions	3	4	0	.429	101	115	
Bornem Titans	1	6	0	.143	32	177	
Ghent Gators	0	7	0	.000	56	196	L7

FFL 2007 Standings
	W	L	T	PCT	PF	PA	STK
West Flanders Tribes	6	0	1	.857	198	34	W6
Brussels Black Angels	6	1	0	.857	148	51	
Antwerp Diamonds	4	3	0	.571	74	48	
Leuven Lions	2	3	1	.333			
Bornem Titans	1	6	0	.143	26	176	
Ghent Gators	0	6	0	.000			L6

FFL 2008 Standings
	W	L	T	PCT	PF	PA	STK
West Flanders Tribes	8	0	0	1.00	277	59	W8
Brussels Black Angels	6	2	0	.750	271	67	W1
Antwerp Diamonds	5	3	0	.625	101	76	L1
Ghent Gators	5	3	0	.625	146	122	W3
Bornem Titans	3	5	0	.375	39	190	L1
Leuven Lions	1	7	0	.125	66	175	L4
Brussels Bulls	0	8	0	.000	36	247	L8

FFL 2009 Standings
	W	L	T	PCT	PF	PA	STK
West Flanders Tribes	8	0	0	1.00	279	37	W8
Brussels Black Angels	7	1	0	.875	207	75	W6
Bornem Titans	4	4	0	.500	141	166	W3
Brussels Bulls	3	5	0	.375	159	194	L3
Leuven Lions	2	5	1	.313	78	168	L4
Antwerp Diamonds	2	6	0	.250	82	191	L2
Ghent Gators	1	6	1	.188	119	230	L1

=== 2010 season ===
Gators Regular season 2010
Date	Kickoff	Opponent	Result		Location
Date	Kickoff	Opponent	Score	Team record	Location
21/02	15:00	Brussels Bulls	W 19-00	1-0-0	Gent
07/03	12:30	Brussels Black Angels	L 20-12	1-1-0	Oostende
21/03	16:00	Limburg Shotguns	W 20-14	2-1-0	Gent
28/03	12:30	Bornem Titans	L 20-06	2-2-0	Brussel
04/04	12:30	Antwerp Diamonds	W 48-12	3-2-0	Brussel
11/04	12:30	West-Vlaanderen Tribes	L 29-09	3-3-0	Brussel
18/04	12:30	Limburg Shotguns	W 13-06	4-3-0	Brussel
02/05	15:00	Leuven Lions	T 06-06	4-3-1	Leuven

COLOR KEY:

- Win - Tie - Loss.

FFL 2010 Standings
	W	L	T	PCT	PF	PA	STK
West Flanders Tribes	8	0	0	1.00	263	77	W8
Brussels Black Angels	7	1	0	.875	179	66	W4
Bornem Titans	5	3	0	.625	192	94	L2
Ghent Gators	4	3	1	.500	127	100	T1
Antwerp Diamonds	3	5	0	.375	79	170	W1
Brussels Bulls	2	6	0	.250	95	197	L3
Leuven Lions	1	6	1	.125	46	144	T1
Limburg Shotguns	1	7	0	.125	76	208	L2

=== 2011 season ===
Gators Regular season 2011
Date	Kickoff	Opponent	Result		Location
Date	Kickoff	Opponent	Score	Team record	Location
20/02	15:00	Leuven Lions	L 23-00	0-1-0	Gent
06/03	15:00	Bornem Titans	L 14-07	0-2-0	Puurs
13/03	15:00	Antwerp Diamonds	W 15-12	1-2-0	Gent
20/03	12:00	Limburg Shotguns	L 26-06	1-3-0	Berendrecht
03/04	15:00	Brussels Black Angels	L 49-00	1-4-0	Brussel
10/04	15:00	Brussels Bulls	L 54-06	1-5-0	Brussel
17/04	12:00	Leuven Lions	W 10-07	2-5-0	Izegem
08/05	15:00	West-Vlaanderen Tribes	L 54-00	2-6-0	Oostende

FFL 2011 Standings
	W	L	T	PCT	PF	PA	STK
West Flanders Tribes	8	0	0	1.00	283	62	W8
Brussels Black Angels	6	1	1	.928	220	26	W5
Brussels Bulls	5	2	1	.688	253	52	W4
Bornem Titans	4	4	0	.500	114	142	L2
Antwerp Diamonds	3	5	0	.375	101	162	L2
Limburg Shotguns	2	6	0	.250	90	286	L4
Ghent Gators	2	6	0	.250	44	239	L1
Leuven Lions	1	7	0	.125	57	193	L7

=== 2012 season ===
Gators Regular season 2012
Date	Kickoff	Opponent	Result		Location
Date	Kickoff	Opponent	Score	Team record	Location
11/03	12:00	Puurs Titans	W 41-00	1-0-0	Brussel
18/03	15:00	Antwerp Diamonds	L 10-07	1-1-0	Gent
01/04	15:00	Brussels Black Angels	L 25-00	1-2-0	Brussel
15/04	15:00	Leuven Lions	W 08-07	2-2-0	Gent
22/04	15:00	Brussels Bulls	L 31-07	2-3-0	Brussel
05/05	14:00	West-Vlaanderen Tribes	L 41-13	2-4-0	Oostende

FFL 2012 Standings
	W	L	T	PCT	PF	PA	STK
Brussels Bulls	5	1	0	.833	117	55	L1
West Flanders Tribes	4	1	1	.667	157	80	W3
Antwerp Diamonds	4	1	1	.667	78	47	W1
Brussels Black Angels	4	2	0	.667	77	37	W3
Ghent Gators	2	4	0	.333	76	114	L2
Leuven Lions	0	5	1	.000	57	95	L4
Puurs Titans	0	5	1	.000	47	183	L3
Limburg Shotguns (*)	-	-	-	-	-	-	-

- (*)Limburg Shotguns gave forfait for the entire 2012 season. The games the Shotguns played became null and void, as if they were never played.

=== 2013 season ===
Gators Regular season 2013
Date	Kickoff	Opponent	Result		Location
Date	Kickoff	Opponent	Score	Team record	Location
09/02	12:00	Brussel Black Angels	L 34-07	0-1-0	Izegem
10/03	15:00	Leuven Lions	T 00-00	0-1-1	Leuven
17/03	15:00	Puurs Titans	L 28-13	0-2-1	Gent
14/04	11:00	Izegem Tribes	W 14-07	1-2-1	Puurs
28/04	12:00	Antwerp Diamonds	L 24-12	1-3-1	Brussel
05/05	15:00	Brussels Bulls	L 33-00	1-4-1	Brussel

FFL 2013 Standings
	W	L	T	PCT	PF	PA	STK
Brussels Bulls	6	0	0	1.00	178	14	W6
Brussels Black Angels	5	1	0	.833	127	29	W3
Puurs Titans	3	2	0	.600	81	54	W1
Leuven Lions	2	3	1	.417	56	96	L2
Antwerp Diamonds	1	3	1	.300	49	105	T1
Ghent Gators	1	4	1	.250	46	126	L2
Izegem Tribes	0	5	1	.083	49	162	T1

=== 2014 season ===
After their sixth win of the season - versus the Puurs Titans - the Ghent Gators qualified for the playoffs for the first time since being established in 1999. They finished the season as the first seed in the Flemish American Football League and by doing so, won the Flemish championship and earned a first round bye for the playoffs. In the playoffs they beat the Ostend Pirates - they only team that had beaten them so far this season - in a Semi Final thriller and qualified for Belgian Bowl XXVII. In their first ever Belgian Bowl, the Gators defeated the Brussels Tigers (Walloon Champions) 38-0 and became Belgian Champions.

Gators Regular season 2014
Date	Kickoff	Opponent	Result		Location
Date	Kickoff	Opponent	Score	Team record	Location
09/02	12:00	Brussels Black Angels	W 28-14	1-0-0	Beringen
23/02	12:00	Brussels Bulls	W 14-00	2-0-0	Oostende
09/03	15:00	Izegem Tribes	W 30-08	3-0-0	Gent
23/03	12:00	Limburg Shotguns	W 56-06	4-0-0	Brussel
20/04	15:00	Leuven Lions	W 34-00	5-0-0	Leuven
04/05	15:00	Ostend Pirates	L 22-25	5-1-0	Oostende
18/05	12:00	Puurs Titans	W 56-06	6-1-0	Izegem
01/06	15:00	Antwerp Diamonds	W 48-06	7-1-0	Gent
2014 Playoffs
15/06	16:00	Ostend Pirates	W 16-14	8-1-0	Gent
Belgian Bowl XXVII
29/06	14:30	Brussels Tigers	W 38-00	9-1-0	Izegem

FAFL 2014 Standings
	W	L	T	PCT	PF	PA	STK
Ghent Gators	7	1	0	.875	288	65	W2
Brussels Black Angels	7	1	0	.875	226	66	W7
Ostend Pirates	6	2	0	.750	196	84	W4
Brussels Bulls	5	3	0	.625	158	73	W2
Leuven Lions	4	4	0	.500	148	138	W1
Puurs Titans	3	5	0	.375	84	219	L3
Limburg Shotguns	2	5	1	.313	80	208	L2
Izegem Tribes	1	6	1	.188	90	203	L3
Antwerp Diamonds	0	8	0	.000	51	265	L8

Quarterfinals; June 8, 2014 @Grez-Doiceau @Anderlecht
2	Grez-Doiceau Fighting Turtles	22
3	Ostend Pirates	30
2	Brussels Black Angels	52
3	Liège Monarchs	12

Semifinals; June 15, 2014 @Gent @Evere
1	Ghent Gators	16
3	Ostend Pirates	14
1	Brussels Tigers	7
2	Brussels Black Angels	3

Belgian Bowl XXVII; June 29, 2014 @ Izegem
1	Ghent Gators	38
1	Brussels Tigers	0

=== 2015 season ===
Gators Regular season 2015
Date	Kickoff	Opponent	Result		Location
Date	Kickoff	Opponent	Score	Team record	Location
15/02	12:00	Leuven Lions	W 42-06	1-0-0	Antwerp
22/02	12:00	Puurs Titans	W 40-00	2-0-0	Izegem
08/03	12:00	Izegem Tribes	W 50-00	3-0-0	Leuven
22/03	15:00	Antwerp Diamonds	W 22-00	4-0-0	Ghent
05/04	12:00	Limburg Shotguns	W 52-00	5-0-0	Leuven
17/05	14:00	Ostend Pirates	W 20-12	6-0-0	Ghent
24/05	12:00	Brussels Black Angels	L 00-39	6-1-0	Puurs

FAFL 2015 Standings
	W	L	T	PCT	PF	PA	STK
Brussels Black Angels	7	0	0	1.00	295		W7
Ghent Gators	6	1	0	0.857	216		L1
Ostend Pirates	5	2	0	.714	187		
Izegem Tribes	4	3	0	.571	114		
Antwerp Diamonds	2	5	0	.286	68		
Leuven Lions	2	5	0	.167	84		W
Limburg Shotguns	1	6	0	.143	85		L
Puurs Titans	1	6	0	.143	71		

Quarterfinals; June 7th, 2015
2	Liège Monarchs	12
3	Ostend Pirates	22
2	Ghent Gators	22
3	Waterloo Warriors	24

Semifinals; June 14th, 2015
1	Brussels Black Angels	14
3	Ostend Pirates	6
1	Brussels Tigers	56
3	Waterloo Warriors	14

Belgian Bowl XXVIII; June 27th, 2015 @ Sint-Niklaas
1	Brussels Tigers	8
1	Brussels Black Angels	13

=== 2017 season ===
Gators Regular season 2017
Date	Kickoff	Opponent	Result		Location
Date	Kickoff	Opponent	Score	Team record	Location
05/03	14:00	Waterloo Warriors	W 42-06	1-0-0	Ghent
19/03	14:00	Ostend Pirates	W 38-00	2-0-0	Ghent
02/04	14:00	Brussels Tigers	L 14-77	2-1-0	Evere
16/04	14:00	Antwerp Argonauts	W 48-09	3-1-0	Ghent
30/04	14:00	Grez-Doiceau Fighting Turtles	W 56-14	4-1-0	Ghent
14/05	14:00	Liege Monarchs	W 20-6	5-1-0	Liege
28/05	14:00	Brussels Black Angels	L 00-50	6-2-0	Brussels

Pos.	Team	GP	Streak	W	L	T	PF	PA	Diff
1	Black Angels	7	Won 7	7	0	0	272	08	+264
2	Tigers	7	Won 2	6	1	0	311	41	+277
3	Pirates	7	Won 1	4	3	0	120	134	-14
4	Warriors	7	Lost 1	2	4	1	67	180	-113
5	Monarchs	7	Won 1	1	5	1	43	192	-149
6	Turtles	7	Lost 4	1	6	0	78	331	-253
7	Argonauts	7	Lost 2	1	6	0	68	195	-127
DSQ	Gators	7	Lost 1	5	2	0	218	137	+81

2017 BFL season

=== 2018 season ===
Gators Regular season 2018
Date	Kickoff	Opponent	Result		Location
Date	Kickoff	Opponent	Score	Team record	Location
25/02	12:00	Izegem Tribes	W 26-15	1-0-0	Sint-Pauwels
18/03	15:00	Leuven Lions	W 32-00	2-0-0	Ghent
01/04	12:00	Izegem Tribes	W 34-21	3-0-0	Leuven
15/04	12:00	Waasland Wolves	W 32-06	4-0-0	Izegem
29/04	15:00	Leuven Lions	W 30-07	5-0-0	Ghent
05/05	12:00	Waasland Wolves	W 54-06	6-0-0	Izegem
13/05	12:00	Izegem Tribes	W 18-16	7-0-0	Leuven
27/05	12:00	Leuven Lions	W 50-0	8-0-0	Sint-Pauwels
FAFL Bowl
10/06	14:00	Izegem Tribes	L 28-34	8-1-0	Ghent

2018 BFL season
