= 2012 BFL season =

- Total # of teams: 15
- Regular season: February 19
- Playoffs: May 22 – May 27
- Belgian Bowl: Belgian Bowl XXV
- Belgian Bowl Date: June 9, 2012
- Belgian Bowl Location: Ostend, Belgium
- Belgian Bowl Champions: Brussels Tigers
- FFL Champions: Brussels Bulls
- LFFAB Champions: Brussels Tigers

The 2012 season of the Belgian Football League (BFL) is the regular season played in the Belgium. The championship game is the Belgian Bowl XXV.

== Regular season ==
=== Regular season standings ===
FFL 2012 Standings
	W	L	T	PCT	PF	PA	STK
Brussels Bulls	5	1	0	.833	117	55	L1
West Flanders Tribes	4	1	1	.667	157	80	W3
Antwerp Diamonds	4	1	1	.667	78	47	W1
Brussels Black Angels	4	2	0	.667	77	37	W3
Ghent Gators	2	4	0	.333	76	114	L2
Leuven Lions	0	5	1	.000	57	95	L4
Puurs Titans	0	5	1	.000	47	183	L3
Limburg Shotguns (*)	-	-	-	-	-	-	-

- (*)Limburg Shotguns gave forfait for the entire 2012 season. The games the Shotguns played became null and void, as if they were never played.

LFFAB 2012 Standings
	W	L	T	PCT	PF	PA	STK
Brussels Tigers	8	0	0	1.00	310	20	W8
Corbais Fighting Turtles	6	2	0	.750	206	93	
Liège Monarchs	4	4	0	.500	146	152	
Charleroi Cougars	4	4	0	.500	160	170	
Andenne Bears	3	5	0	.375	142	200	
Tournai Phoenix	1	6	1	.125	138	235	
Luxembourg Steelers	1	6	1	.125	54	247	

– clinched seed to the playoffs

== Postseason ==
Belgian Bowl XXV
Antwerp Diamonds (FFL)	Brussels Tigers (LFFAB)
6	46
- Date: June 9

In the Wild Card Playoffs both teams of the FFL won their games. The top ranked team of the FFL, the Brussels Bulls lost in the Semifinals against the Antwerp Diamonds. In the regular season the Bulls won all but one game, that was the game against the Diamonds. The Brussels Tigers made a perfect season winning all eight games in the LFFAB and also the two games in the playoffs including the Belgian Bowl.

The Belgian Bowl XXV was held on June 9, 2012 in Ostend. The Brussels Tigers won over the Antwerp Diamonds in a rematch of Belgian Bowl XV . It was the second time for the Brussels Tigers to win the national trophy.

Quarterfinals; May 20, 2012 @ Ottignies, Ostend
2	Corbais Fighting Turtles	13
3	Antwerp Diamonds	22
2	West Flanders Tribes	42
3	Liège Monarchs	0

Semifinals; May 27, 2012 @ Molenbeek, Evere
1	Brussels Bulls	9
3	Antwerp Diamonds	12
1	Brussels Tigers	34
2	West Flanders Tribes	7

Belgian Bowl XXV; June 9, 2012 @ Ostend
3	Antwerp Diamonds	6
1	Brussels Tigers	46
