= 2000 BFL season =

- Total # of teams: 6
- Regular season: February 20
- Playoffs: May 7 – May 14
- Belgian Bowl: Belgian Bowl XIII
- Belgian Bowl Date: May 28
- Belgian Bowl Location: Izegem
- Belgian Bowl Champions: Izeghem Redskins

The 2000 season of the Belgian Football League (BFL) is the regular season played in the Belgium. The Izeghem Redskins won Belgian Bowl XIII against the Charleroi Cougars by a score of 28–0.

== Regular season ==
=== Regular season standings ===
BFL 2000 Standings
	W	L	T	PCT	PF	PA	STK
Izegem Redskins	7	1	0	.875	202	67	W7
Charleroi Cougars	6	2	0	.750	138	40	
Liège Red Roosters	3	5	0	.375	77	108	
Flemalle Flames	3	5	0	.375	52	186	
Brussels Tigers	2	6	0	.250	76	154	
Ghent Gators*	0	7	0	.000	57	256	

- (*) Ghent was removed from competition on April 14, 2000. All results were cancelled.

== Postseason ==
Belgian Bowl XIII
Charleroi Cougars (LFFAB)	Izeghem Redskins (FFL)
0	28
- Date: May 28, 2000

Quarterfinals; May 7, 2000 @ Brussels
1	Izegem Redskins	20
5	Brussels Tigers	16
3	Liège Red Roosters	50
6	Ghent Gators (FF)	0

Semifinals; May 14, 2000 @ Izeghem
1	Izegem Redskins	34
4	Flemalle Flames	20
2	Charleroi Cougars	14
3	Liège Red Roosters	12

Belgian Bowl XIII; May 28, 2000 @ Izeghem
1	Izegem Redskins	28
2	Charleroi Cougars	0
