= Brussels Bulls =

General information
- Founded: 2005
- Stadium: Centre Sportif; Berchem-Sainte-Agathe; Rue des Chalets 1
- Headquartered: Brussels

Personnel
- Head coach: Stijn de Backer

League / conference affiliations
- Belgian Football League; Flemish American Football League

Championships
- League championships: 0 None
- Division championships: 2; 2012; 2013

Current uniform
Home

Away

The Brussels Bulls are a professional American football team based in Brussels, Belgium. The Bulls compete in the Flemish American Football League (FAFL) conference in the Belgian Football League (BFL).

== History ==
=== 2008 season ===
FFL 2008 Standings
	W	L	T	PCT	PF	PA	STK
West Flanders Tribes	8	0	0	1.00	277	59	W8
Brussels Black Angels	6	2	0	.750	271	67	W1
Antwerp Diamonds	5	3	0	.625	101	76	L1
Ghent Gators	5	3	0	.625	146	122	W3
Bornem Titans	3	5	0	.375	39	190	L1
Leuven Lions	1	7	0	.125	66	175	L4
Brussels Bulls	0	8	0	.000	36	247	L8

=== 2009 season ===
FFL 2009 Standings
	W	L	T	PCT	PF	PA	STK
West Flanders Tribes	8	0	0	1.00	279	37	W8
Brussels Black Angels	7	1	0	.875	207	75	W6
Bornem Titans	4	4	0	.500	141	166	W3
Brussels Bulls	3	5	0	.375	159	194	L3
Leuven Lions	2	5	1	.313	78	168	L4
Antwerp Diamonds	2	6	0	.250	82	191	L2
Ghent Gators	1	6	1	.188	119	230	L1

=== 2010 season ===
==== Regular season ====
FFL 2010 Standings
	W	L	T	PCT	PF	PA	STK
West Flanders Tribes	8	0	0	1.00	263	77	W8
Brussels Black Angels	7	1	0	.875	179	66	W4
Bornem Titans	5	3	0	.625	192	94	L2
Ghent Gators	4	3	1	.500	127	100	T1
Antwerp Diamonds	3	5	0	.375	79	170	W1
Brussels Bulls	2	6	0	.250	95	197	L3
Leuven Lions	1	6	1	.125	46	144	T1
Limburg Shotguns	1	7	0	.125	76	208	L2

==== EFAF Atlantic Cup ====
The Bulls were 3rd at the 2010 Atlantic Cup in Ireland.

Semifinals; June 26, 2010 @ Dublin
(Republic of Ireland) UL Vikings	58
(Luxembourg) Dudelange Dragons	14
(Netherlands) Lelystad Commanders	48
(Belgium) Brussels Bulls	0

Atlantic Cup Finals; June 27, 2010 @ Dublin
1	(Republic of Ireland) UL Vikings	19
2	(Netherlands) Lelystad Commanders	18
Third place June 27, 2010 @ Dublin
3	(Belgium) Brussels Bulls	21
4	(Luxembourg) Dudelange Dragons	6

=== 2011 season ===
FFL 2011 Standings
	W	L	T	PCT	PF	PA	STK
West Flanders Tribes	8	0	0	1.00	283	62	W8
Brussels Black Angels	6	1	1	.928	220	26	W5
Brussels Bulls	5	2	1	.688	253	52	W4
Bornem Titans	4	4	0	.500	114	142	L2
Antwerp Diamonds	3	5	0	.375	101	162	L2
Limburg Shotguns	2	6	0	.250	90	286	L4
Ghent Gators	2	6	0	.250	44	239	L1
Leuven Lions	1	7	0	.125	57	193	L7

2011 Playoffs

Quarterfinals; May 15 @ Charleroi/Anderlecht
2	Charleroi Cougars	0
3	Brussels Bulls	49
2	Brussels Black Angels	35
3	Ottignies Fighting Turtles	0

Semifinals; May 22, 2011 @ Izegem/Evere
1	West Flanders Tribes	27
3	Brussels Bulls	21
1	Brussels Tigers	10
2	Brussels Black Angels	38

Belgian Bowl XXIV; June 4, 2011 @ Ostend
1	West Flanders Tribes	20
2	Brussels Black Angels	14

=== 2012 season ===
FFL 2012 Standings
	W	L	T	PCT	PF	PA	STK
Brussels Bulls	5	1	0	.833	117	55	L1
West Flanders Tribes	4	1	1	.667	157	80	W3
Antwerp Diamonds	4	1	1	.667	78	47	W1
Brussels Black Angels	4	2	0	.667	77	37	W3
Ghent Gators	2	4	0	.333	76	114	L2
Leuven Lions	0	5	1	.000	57	95	L4
Puurs Titans	0	5	1	.000	47	183	L3
Limburg Shotguns (*)	-	-	-	-	-	-	-

- (*)Limburg Shotguns gave forfait for the entire 2012 season. The games the Shotguns played became null and void, as if they were never played.

2012 Playoffs

Quarterfinals; May 20, 2012 @ Ottignies, Ostend
2	Corbais Fighting Turtles	13
3	Antwerp Diamonds	22
2	West Flanders Tribes	42
3	Liège Monarchs	0

Semifinals; May 27, 2012 @ Molenbeek, Evere
1	Brussels Bulls	9
3	Antwerp Diamonds	12
1	Brussels Tigers	34
2	West Flanders Tribes	7

Belgian Bowl XXV; June 9, 2012 @ Ostend
3	Antwerp Diamonds	6
1	Brussels Tigers	46

=== 2013 season ===
FFL 2013 Standings
	W	L	T	PCT	PF	PA	STK
Brussels Bulls	6	0	0	1.00	178	14	W6
Brussels Black Angels	5	1	0	.833	127	29	W3
Puurs Titans	3	2	0	.600	81	54	W1
Leuven Lions	2	3	1	.417	56	96	L2
Antwerp Diamonds	1	3	1	.300	49	105	T1
Ghent Gators	1	4	1	.250	46	126	L2
Izegem Tribes	0	5	1	.083	49	162	T1

2013 Playoffs

Quarterfinals; May 12, 2013 @ TBD
2	Corbais Fighting Turtles	24
3	Puurs Titans	2
2	Brussels Black Angels
3	Liege Monarchs

Semifinals; May 19, 2013 @ TBD
1	Brussels Bulls	50
2	Corbais Fighting Turtles	14
1	Brussels Tigers	37
2	Brussels Black Angels	7

Belgian Bowl XXVI; June 2, 2013 @ Izegem
1	Brussels Bulls	0
1	Brussels Tigers	9

=== 2014 season ===
FAFL 2014 Standings
	W	L	T	PCT	PF	PA	STK
Ghent Gators	7	1	0	.875	288	65	W2
Brussels Black Angels	7	1	0	.875	226	66	W7
Ostend Pirates	6	2	0	.750	196	84	W4
Brussels Bulls	5	3	0	.625	158	73	W2
Leuven Lions	4	4	0	.500	148	138	W1
Puurs Titans	3	5	0	.375	84	219	L3
Limburg Shotguns	2	5	1	.313	80	208	L2
Izegem Tribes	1	6	1	.188	90	203	L3
Antwerp Diamonds	0	8	0	.000	51	265	L8

== About the organisation ==
- The Brussels Bulls American & Flag Football team was created in August 2005 by Lesley Moreels (ex-Brussels Saints, Brussels USR, Brussels Tigers), Jean-François Waignier (ASBL board member) and Stijn De Backer (ex-Brussels Tigers, Brussels American School Brigands).
- Organigram:
  - President: Stijn De Backer
  - Secretary: Nathalie De Coster
  - Treasury: Vincent De Coster
  - Board: Alain Huwart
- From the beginning, the Bulls have opted to develop a youth programme and to create on different levels youth teams, in order to support a strong Senior (19+) team.
- The Brussels Bulls home field is based in Berchem-Sainte-Agathe, Brussels, Belgium.

== Statistics ==
=== Performance (2008-2011) ===
This is an overview of the performance of the Bulls against the teams in the BFL during the BFL regular and post seasons from 2008 until 2011 and the EFAF Atlantic Cup's from 2009 until 2011.

Overview Bulls 2008-2011 performance
Opponent	W	L	T	PCT	Last match	Last win	Last loss
FFL Teams
Antwerp Diamonds	1	4	0	.200			
Bornem Titans	2	3	0	.400			
Brussels Black Angels	0	4	1	.000	March 13, 2011	None	April 4, 2010
Ghent Gators	2	2	0	.500			
Leuven Lions	2	2	0	.500			
Limburg Shotguns	3	0	0	1.00	May 8, 2011 (FF)	May 8, 2011 (FF)	None
West Flanders Tribes	0	7	0	.000	May 22, 2011	None	May 22, 2011
LFFAB Teams
Charleroi Cougars	0	1	0	.000	May 15, 2011	None	May 15, 2011
Dudelange Dragons	1	0	0	1.00	June 27, 2010	June 27, 2010	None

== National titles ==
- 2009 Under-17 (Cadet) Flag champion
- 2009 Under-19 (Junior) Tackle Champion
- 2010 Under-17 (Junior Flag) Flag Champion
- 2010 Under-19 (Junior) Tackle Champion
- 2011 Under-19 (Junior) tackle Champion
- 2012 Under-13 (PeeWee) Flag Champion
- 2012 Under-17 (Cadet) Tackle Irisbowl Champion (Unofficial national champion 2012)
- 2012 Under-19 (Junior) tackle Champion
