= Belgian Bowl =

In American football, the Belgian Bowl is the championship game of the Belgian American Football League (BAFL). At the end of each regular season, three teams from each conference play in the BFL playoffs, a six-team single-elimination tournament that culminates with the Belgian Bowl.

== History ==
Championship of Belgium (1987–1994)
Date	Champion
1987	Mouscron Redskins
1988	Brussels Raiders
1989	Brussels Raiders
1990	Brussels Raiders
1991	Brussels Raiders
1992	Leuven Lions
1993	Luxembourg Red Lions
1994	Brussels Raiders
Belgian Bowl (from 1995)
Date	Bowl	Champion	result	Runner-up
1995	Belgian Bowl VIII	Tournai Cardinals	34–12	Brussels Raiders
1996	Belgian Bowl IX	Tournai Cardinals	13–6	Brussels Angels
1997	Belgian Bowl X	Tournai Cardinals	98–7	Brussels Angels
1998	Belgian Bowl XI	Tournai Cardinals	16–3	Brussels Angels
1999	Belgian Bowl XII	Antwerp Diamonds	41–6	Izeghem Redskins
2000	Belgian Bowl XIII	Izeghem Redskins	28–0	Charleroi Cougars
2001	Belgian Bowl XIV	Izeghem Redskins	22–0	Brussels Tigers
2002	Belgian Bowl XV	Brussels Tigers	24–14	Antwerp Diamonds
2003	Belgian Bowl XVI	Brussels Black Angels	NO BOWL	Antwerp Diamonds
2004	Belgian Bowl XVII	Antwerp Diamonds	12–0	Leuven Lions
2005	Belgian Bowl XVIII	Antwerp Diamonds	13–2	Brussels Black Angels
2006	Belgian Bowl XIX	West Flanders Tribes	23–14	Tournai Phoenix
2007	Belgian Bowl XX	West Flanders Tribes	35–13	Brussels Black Angels
2008	Belgian Bowl XXI	West Flanders Tribes	25–20	Brussels Black Angels
2009	Belgian Bowl XXII	West Flanders Tribes	12–0	Tournai Phoenix
2010	Belgian Bowl XXIII	West Flanders Tribes	36–6	Brussels Tigers
2011	Belgian Bowl XXIV	West Flanders Tribes	20–14	Brussels Black Angels
2012	Belgian Bowl XXV	Brussels Tigers	46–6	Antwerp Diamonds
2013	Belgian Bowl XXVI	Brussels Tigers	9–0	Brussels Bulls
2014	Belgian Bowl XXVII	Ghent Gators	38–0	Brussels Tigers
2015	Belgian Bowl XXVIII	Brussels Black Angels	13–8	Brussels Tigers
2016	Belgian Bowl XXIX	Ostend Pirates	16–15	Brussels Black Angels
2017	Belgian Bowl XXX	Brussels Black Angels	27–20	Brussels Tigers
2018	Belgian Bowl XXXI	Brussels Black Angels	50–0	Limburg Shotguns
2019	Belgian Bowl XXXII	Brussels Black Angels	40–20	Limburg Shotguns
2021	Belgian Bowl XXXIII	Limburg Shotguns	1–0 (Note: Black Angels did not show up)	Brussels Black Angels
2023	Belgian Bowl XXXIV	Ostend Pirates	27–0	Mons Knights
2024	Belgian Bowl XXXV	Mons Knights	33–30	Waterloo Warriors
2025		Brussels Black Angels	58–6	Izegem Tribes
2026	Belgian Bowl 2026	Brussels Black Angels	26–16	Izegem Tribes

== Statistics ==
Championship of Belgium & Belgian Bowl statistics
A	Club	W	L	PCT	LW	LL	A STK	W STK	L STK
9	West Flanders Tribes*	8	1	.889	2011	1999	6	6	1
6	Brussels Raiders †	5	1	.833	1994	1995	1	4	1
14	Brussels Black Angels	5	9	.357	2019	2021	6	3	3
6	Tournai Phoenix**	4	2	.667	1998	2009	4	4	2
4	Tournai Cardinals** †	4	0	1.00	1998	N/A	4	4	0
6	Antwerp Diamonds	3	3	.500	2005	2012	4	2	2
8	Brussels Tigers	3	5	.375	2013	2015	4	2	3
3	Izeghem Redskins* †	2	1	.667	2001	1999	2	2	1
3	Limburg Shotguns	1	2	.333	2021	2018	3	1	2
2	Ostend Pirates	2	0	1.00	2023	N/A	1	**1**	0
2	Leuven Lions	1	1	.500	2004	1992	1	1	1
1	Ghent Gators	1	0	1.00	2014	N/A	1	1	0
1	Mouscron Redskins †	1	0	1.00	1987	N/A	1	1	0
1	Luxembourg Red Lions †	1	0	1.00	1993	N/A	1	1	0
1	Brussels Bulls	0	1	.000	N/A	2013	1	0	1

- in italics and †: defunct team or old name
  - (*) Izeghem Redskins became the West Flanders Tribes.
  - (**) Tournai Cardinals became the Tournai Phoenix.
- Bold indicates a still active streak.
