= West Flanders Tribes =

General information
- Founded: 1989
- Folded: 2012
- Stadium: De Schorre, Ostend (terrain 23); Sportpark de Krekel, Izegem (terrain 4)
- Headquartered: West Flanders

Personnel
- General manager: Ben Machiels
- Head coach: Benedict Verheyen

League / conference affiliations
- Belgian Football League; Flemish Football League

Championships
- League championships: 0; 8 (2000, 2001, 2006, 2007, 2008, 2009, 2010, 2011)
- Division championships: 0; 6 (2006, 2007, 2008, 2009, 2010, 2011)

Uniform
Home

Away

The West Flanders Tribes was a Belgian American football team based in the province of West-Flanders, with two home cities, Ostend and Izegem. The Tribes were members of the Flemish American Football League (FFL) conference in the Belgian Football League (BFL). Their team colours are maroon, white and black. In 2012, the team split up into the Ostend Pirates and the Izegem Tribes.

== History ==
=== 1990 ===
In 1990 the Izegem Redskins were formed by Rudy Dewaegemaeker after his old team, the Moeskroen Redskins, was disbanded. After a couple of months of practice the Redskins played their first game against the Brussel Raiders. The Raiders, led by Mike La Salle and QB Jon VandeMergel, beat the Redskins 78-0. The game was stopped in the 3rd quarter. This poor start was a harbinger of years of losses. But the Redskins were a group of friends, crazy about the game of football, so they stuck in there. During the second season they scored their first touchdown, which was celebrated afterwards as if they were World Champions. They won their first game in their fourth season.

=== 1994 ===
In 1994 the other team in the province, the Ostend Tigers, ended play. Players from the Tigers transferred to Izegem to start playing with the Redskins. At the time there were 2 coaches: Frank Daemen and John Vandemergel. After Daemens' tragic death. Luc Verhoest, the quarterback, took over as Offensive coach and John Vandemergel was the Defensive Coach. Vandermergel became president.
In the mid '90s the Redskins started a junior flag team in Izegem, the Redskin Warriors, coached by Andy Vandenbulcke. A junior team was set up in Ostend also, under the name of the Ostend Seminoles. This was the start of the two practice fields for the Izegem Redskins. The team name was then changed to West-Vlaanderen Tribes as an overall organization, with 2 practice squads: Redskins and Seminoles. During games they played under the name Tribes.

=== 1999 - first Bowl appearance ===
In 1999 the Redskins played the Antwerp Diamonds in Belgian Bowl XII but lost in their first Belgian Bowl appearance with a score of 41-6.

=== First two Belgian Titles ===
==== 2000 season ====
Tribes 2000 Season
Week	Date	Visitors	Results	Home	Game Site
1	February 20	Charleroi Cougars	12 - 0	Izegem Redskins	Ghent
2	February 27	Ghent Gators	0 - 22	Izegem Redskins	Charleroi
3	March 5	Bye			
4	March 12	Izegem Redskins	56 - 6	Flemalle Flames	Flemalle
5	March 19	Izegem Redskins	20 - 18	Liège Red Roosters	Liège
6	March 26	Ghent Gators	14 - 26	Izegem Redskins	Izeghem
7	April 2	Flemalle Flames	0 - 50	Izegem Redskins	Izeghem
8	April 9	Liège Red Roosters	3 - 20	Izegem Redskins	Ghent
9	April 16	Brussels Tigers	12 - 20	Izegem Redskins	Izeghem
10	April 23	Bye			
11	April 30	Izegem Redskins	26 - 0	Charleroi Cougars	Charleroi
Post Season
12	May 7	Izegem Redskins	20 - 16	Brussels Tigers	Brussels
13	May 14	Flemalle Flames	20 - 34	Izegem Redskins	Izeghem
14	May 21	Belgian Bowl Bye			
15	May 28	Belgian Bowl XIII			Izeghem
15	May 28	Charleroi Cougars	0 - 28	Izegem Redskins	Izeghem

COLOR KEY:

- Win - Tie - Loss.

BFL 2000 Standings
	W	L	T	PCT	PF	PA	STK
Izegem Redskins	7	1	0	.875	202	67	W7
Charleroi Cougars	6	2	0	.750	138	40	
Liège Red Roosters	3	5	0	.375	77	108	
Flemalle Flames	3	5	0	.375	52	186	
Brussels Tigers	2	6	0	.250	76	154	
Ghent Gators*	0	7	0	.000	57	256	

- (*) Ghent was removed from competition on April 14, 2000. All results were cancelled.

2000 Playoffs

Quarterfinals; May 7, 2000 @ Brussels
1	Izegem Redskins	20
5	Brussels Tigers	16
3	Liège Red Roosters	50
6	Ghent Gators (FF)	0

Semifinals; May 14, 2000 @ Izeghem
1	Izegem Redskins	34
4	Flemalle Flames	20
2	Charleroi Cougars	14
3	Liège Red Roosters	12

Belgian Bowl XIII; May 28, 2000 @ Izeghem
1	Izegem Redskins	28
2	Charleroi Cougars	0

==== 2001 season ====
COLOR KEY:

- Win - Tie - Loss.

Tribes 2001 Season
Week	Date	Visitors	Results	Home	Game Site
1	March 11	Charleroi Cougars	8 - 14	West Flanders Tribes	Izeghem
2	March 18	West Flanders Tribes	14 - 0	Liège Red Roosters	Ghent
3	March 25	Easter Bye			
4	April 1	Bye			
5	April 8	West Flanders Tribes	16 - 14	Charleroi Cougars	Liège
6	April 15	Bye			
7	April 22	Brussels Angels	0 - 22	West Flanders Tribes	Izegem
8	April 29	Bye			
9	May 6	Liège Red Roosters	7 - 12	West Flanders Tribes	Antwerp
Post Season
10	May 13	Playoffs Bye			
11	May 20	Brussels Angels	14 - 42	West Flanders Tribes	Waregem
12	May 27	Belgian Bowl Bye			
13	June 3	Belgian Bowl XIV			Ghent
13	June 3	West Flanders Tribes	22 - 0	Brussels Tigers	Ghent

2001 BFL Division I Standings
Pos	Team	Pld	W	L	D	PF	PA	PD	PCT	STK
1	Izegem Redskins	5	5	0	0	76	29	+47	1.000	W5
2	Charleroi Cougars	5	3	2	0	74	45	+29	.600	
3	Liège Red Roosters	4	1	3	0	60	58	+2	.250	
4	Brussels Angels	4	0	4	0	12	90	−78	.000	L4

2001 Playoffs

Wildcard round May 13, 2001 @ Liège
4	Brussels Angels	26
W	Antwerp Diamonds	6
3	Liège Red Roosters	0
W	Brussels Tigers	28

Semifinals; May 20, 2001 @ Waregem
1	Izegem Redskins	42
4	Brussels Angels	14
2	Charleroi Cougars	6
W	Brussels Tigers	20

Belgian Bowl XIV; June 3, 2001 @ Ghent
1	Izegem Redskins	22
W	Brussels Tigers	0

=== 2002 season ===
Tribes 2002 Season
Week	Date	Visitors	Results	Home	Game Site
1	March 3	Tournai Phoenix	14 - 8	West Flanders Tribes	Antwerp
2	March 10	Antwerp Diamonds	18 - 0	West Flanders Tribes	Tournai
3	March 17	Brussels Tigers	14 - 12	West Flanders Tribes	Liège
4	March 24	Flemalle Flames	26 - 32	West Flanders Tribes	Izeghem
5	March 31	Easter Bye			
6	April 7	West Flanders Tribes	26 - 6	Charleroi Cougars	Charleroi
7	April 14	Bye			
8	April 21	Liège Red Roosters	0 - 50 (FF)	West Flanders Tribes	Tournai
9	April 28	Brussels Black Angels	6 - 6	West Flanders Tribes	Izeghem
10	May 5	West Flanders Tribes	12 - 0	Ghent Gators	Ghent
11	May 12	Bye			
Post Season
12	May 19	West Flanders Tribes	6 - 8	Brussels Tigers	Antwerp

COLOR KEY:

- Win - Tie - Loss.

BFL 2002 Standings
	W	L	T	PCT	PF	PA	STK
BFL West 2002 Standings
Antwerp Diamonds	8	0	0	1.00	286	24	W8
Tournai Phoenix	6	2	0	.750	184	78	
West Flanders Tribes	4	3	1	.500	146	90	W1
Ghent Gators	0	8	0	.000	6	299	L8
BFL East 2002 Standings
Brussels Tigers	6	2	0	.750	158	66	
Brussels Angels	4	3	1	.500	160	97	
Flemalle Flames	4	4	0	.500	202	162	
Charleroi Cougars	2	6	0	.250	124	194	
Liège Red Roosters	1	7	0	.125	40	302	

2002 Playoffs

Semifinals; May 19, 2002 @ Antwerp
1	Antwerp Diamonds	30
2	Brussels Angels	8
1	Brussels Tigers	8
3	West Flanders Tribes	6

Belgian Bowl XV; June 2, 2002 @ Ingelmunster
1	Antwerp Diamonds	14
1	Brussels Tigers	24

=== 2003 season ===
Tribes 2003 Season
Week	Date	Visitors	Results	Home	Game Site
1	March 2	Bye			
2	March 9	West Flanders Tribes	6 - 22	Antwerp Diamonds	Antwerp
3	March 16	Bye			
4	March 23	West Flanders Tribes	6 - 26	Flemalle Flames	Charleroi
5	March 30	Brussels Black Angels	14 - 20	West Flanders Tribes	Izeghem
6	April 6	West Flanders Tribes	36 - 0	Liège Red Roosters	Liège
7	April 13	Bye			
8	April 20	Easter Bye			
9	April 27	West Flanders Tribes	6 - 6	Charleroi Cougars	Charleroi
10	May 4	Bye			

COLOR KEY:

- Win - Tie - Loss.

BFL 2003 Standings
	W	L	T	PCT	PF	PA	STK
BFL West 2003 Standings
Antwerp Diamonds	4	1	0	.800	118	40	
West Flanders Tribes	2	2	1	.400	74	68	T1
BFL East 2003 Standings
Brussels Black Angels	4	1	0	.800	140	34	
Flemalle Flames	3	2	0	.600	64	45	
Charleroi Cougars	1	3	1	.200	26	86	
Liège Red Roosters	0	5	0	.000	13	164	L5

=== 2004 season ===
Tribes 2004 Season
Week	Date	Visitors	Results	Home	Game Site
1	February 22	Bye			
2	March 7	West Flanders Tribes	0 - 14	Brussels Black Angels	Antwerp
3	March 14	West Flanders Tribes	6 - 13	Leuven Lions	Brussels (BBA)
4	March 21	Bye			
5	March 28	West Flanders Tribes	6 - 6	Liège Red Roosters	Charleroi
6	April 4	Flemalle Flames	8 - 3	West Flanders Tribes	Izeghem
7	April 11	Easter Bye			
8	April 18	Charleroi Cougars	9 - 6	West Flanders Tribes	Tournai
9	April 25	West Flanders Tribes	26 - 0	Ghent Gators	Leuven
10	May 2	West Flanders Tribes	21 - 0	Brussels Tigers	Brussels (BBA)
11	May 9	Antwerp Diamonds	20 - 0	West Flanders Tribes	Izeghem
12	May 16	Bye			

COLOR KEY:

- Win - Tie - Loss.

BFL 2004 Standings
	W	L	T	PCT	PF	PA	STK
Antwerp Diamonds	8	0	0	1.00	306	0	W8
Leuven Lions	7	1	0	.875	161	43	
Brussels Black Angels	6	2	0	.750	143	46	
Charleroi Cougars	6	3	0	.667	75	115	
Liège Red Roosters	4	4	1	.444	92	161	
Tournai Phoenix	3	5	0	.375	101	94	
Flemalle Flames	3	5	1	.333	78	152	
West Flanders Tribes	2	5	1	.250	68	70	L1
Brussels Tigers	1	8	0	.111	12	177	
Ghent Gators	0	7	1	.000	32	207	

=== 2005 season ===
In 2005 Frans "Harve" Heuvicq took over as head coach. The 2005 season was the last season that the Tribes were beaten on the road.
Off. Coordinator: Frans Heuvicq / Def. Coordinator : John Vandemergel / Off. Assistant : Frederik George / Def. Assistant : Benedict Verheyen.

Tribes 2005 Season
Week	Date	Visitors	Results	Home	Game Site
1	February 27	West Flanders Tribes	7 - 20	Antwerp Diamonds	Antwerp
2	March 6	Bye			
3	March 13	Bye			
4	March 20	Bye			
5	March 27	Easter Bye			
6	April 3	Leuven Lions	0 - 14	West Flanders Tribes	Izeghem
7	April 10	West Flanders Tribes	0 - 6	Antwerp Diamonds	Antwerp
8	April 17	Brussels Black Angels	23 - 8	West Flanders Tribes	Ghent
9	April 24	Bye			
10	May 1	West Flanders Tribes	12 - 12	Brussels Black Angels	Leuven
11	May 8	Leuven Lions	10 - 14	West Flanders Tribes	Izegem
12	May 15	Bye			

COLOR KEY:

- Win - Tie - Loss.

FFL 2005 Standings
	W	L	T	PCT	PF	PA	STK
Antwerp Diamonds	6	0	0	1.00	90	41	W6
Brussels Black Angels	3	2	1	.500	100	58	
West Flanders Tribes	2	3	1	.333	55	71	W1
Leuven Lions	0	6	0	.000	44	119	L6

=== Dominating the BFL (2006-2011) ===
The Tribes have won the last six consecutive Belgian Bowls, setting a European record. Head coach: Frans Heuvicq / Off. Coordinator : Frederik George / Def. Coordinator : Benedict Verheyen

==== 2006 season ====
2006 was the last season the Tribes had a loss (at home, none on the road).

Tribes 2006 Season
Week	Date	Visitors	Results	Home	Game Site
1	February 26	Bye			
2	March 5	Bornem Titans	0 - 26	West Flanders Tribes	Antwerp
3	March 12	Bye			
4	March 19	Antwerp Diamonds	6 - 33	West Flanders Tribes	Izeghem
5	March 26	Bye			
6	April 2	West Flanders Tribes	34 - 0	Ghent Gators	Antwerp
7	April 9	West Flanders Tribes	27 - 18	Brussels Black Angels	Bornem
8	April 16	Easter Bye			
9	April 23	West Flanders Tribes	25 - 19	Ghent Gators	Ghent
10	April 30	Bye			
11	May 7	West Flanders Tribes	19 - 12	Leuven Lions	Leuven
12	May 14	Antwerp Diamonds	20 - 11	West Flanders Tribes	Izeghem
Post Season
13	May 13	Playoffs Bye			
14	May 21	Charleroi Cougars	0 - 26	West Flanders Tribes	Ostend
15	May 28	Belgian Bowl Bye			
16	June 4	Belgian Bowl XIX			Brussels
16	June 4	West Flanders Tribes	23 - 14	Tournai Phoenix	Brussels

COLOR KEY:

- Win - Tie - Loss.

FFL 2006 Standings
	W	L	T	PCT	PF	PA	STK
West Flanders Tribes	6	1	0	.857	175	75	L1
Brussels Black Angels	6	1	0	.857	199	39	
Antwerp Diamonds	5	2	0	.714			
Leuven Lions	3	4	0	.429	101	115	
Bornem Titans	1	6	0	.143	32	177	
Ghent Gators	0	7	0	.000	56	196	L7

2006 Playoffs

LFFAB-only playoff round May 7, 2006 @ Charleroi
2	Charleroi Cougars	28
3	Liège Monarchs	0
1	Tournai Phoenix	50
4	Andenne Bears	0

Semifinals; May 21, 2006 @ Ostend/Tournai
1	West Flanders Tribes	26
2	Charleroi Cougars	0
1	Tournai Phoenix	14
2	Brussels Black Angels	9

Belgian Bowl XIX; June 4, 2006 @ Brussels
1	West Flanders Tribes	23
1	Tournai Phoenix	14

==== 2007 season ====
In 2007 many changes were made to the Operational Board. Due to continuous efforts in youth and improved coaching, the Tribes are now the most successful American Football sport team in the history of Belgium. Every top player is a product of the Tribes youth teams. The Leuven Lions were the last team to play the Tribes and not lose to them, this was a 6-6 tie in week 1 of the 2007 regular season.
Head coach: Frans Heuvicq / Off. Coordinator : Frederik George / Def. Coordinator : Benedict Verheyen

Tribes 2007 Season
Week	Date	Visitors	Results	Home	Game Site
1	February 18	Bye			
2	February 25	West Flanders Tribes	6 - 6	Leuven Lions	Leuven
3	March 4	Bornem Titans	6 - 22	West Flanders Tribes	Izeghem
4	March 11	West Flanders Tribes	14 - 0	Antwerp Diamonds	Antwerp
5	March 18	Ghent Gators	0 - 38	West Flanders Tribes	Ostend
6	March 25	West Flanders Tribes	26 - 7	Brussels Black Angels	Leuven
7	April 1	Bye			
8	April 8	Easter Bye			
9	April 15	Bye			
10	April 22	Bye			
11	April 29	Bornem Titans	3 - 50	West Flanders Tribes	Ostend
12	May 6	West Flanders Tribes	42 - 12	Ghent Gators	Ghent
Post Season
13	May 13	Playoffs Bye			
14	May 20	Charleroi Cougars	6 - 55	West Flanders Tribes	Ostend
15	May 27	Belgian Bowl Bye			
16	June 2	Belgian Bowl XX			Brussels
16	June 2	West Flanders Tribes	35 - 13	Brussels Black Angels	Brussels

COLOR KEY:

- Win - Tie - Loss.

FFL 2007 Standings
	W	L	T	PCT	PF	PA	STK
West Flanders Tribes	6	0	1	.857	198	34	W6
Brussels Black Angels	6	1	0	.857	148	51	
Antwerp Diamonds	4	3	0	.571	74	48	
Leuven Lions	2	3	1	.333			
Bornem Titans	1	6	0	.143	26	176	
Ghent Gators	0	6	0	.000			L6

2007 Playoffs

LFFAB-only playoff round May 6, 2007 @ Charleroi
2	Charleroi Cougars	6
3	Brussels Tigers	0
1	Tournai Phoenix	50
4	La Louvière Wolves	0

Semifinals; May 20, 2007 @ Ostend/Tournai
1	West Flanders Tribes	55
2	Charleroi Cougars	6
1	Tournai Phoenix	7
2	Brussels Black Angels	9

Belgian Bowl XX; June 2, 2007 @ Brussels
1	West Flanders Tribes	35
2	Brussels Black Angels	13

==== 2008 season ====
Tribes 2008 Season
Week	Date	Kick Off	Visitors	Results	Home	Game Site
1	February 17	14.00	West Flanders Tribes	42 - 0	Bornem Titans	Bornem
2	February 24	14.00	Ghent Gators	13 - 20	West Flanders Tribes	Izeghem
3	March 2	13.00	West Flanders Tribes	41 - 14	Brussels Black Angels	Heverlee (LL)
4	March 9	Bye				
5	March 16	13.00	West Flanders Tribes	57 - 6	Brussels Bulls	Brussels (BBA)
6	March 23	Easter Bye				
7	March 30	Bye				
8	April 6	14.00	West Flanders Tribes	45 - 6	Leuven Lions	Heverlee (LL)
9	April 13	14.00	Brussels Black Angels	7 - 8	West Flanders Tribes	Ostend
10	April 20	14.00	West Flanders Tribes	23 - 0	Antwerp Diamonds	Berendrecht (AD)
11	April 27	15.00	Leuven Lions	13 - 41	West Flanders Tribes	Ostend
12	May 4	Bye				
Post Season
13	May 11	Playoff Bye				
14	May 18	14.00	Antwerp Diamonds	6 - 13	West Flanders Tribes	Ostend
15	May 25	Belgian Bowl Bye				
16	May 31	18.00	Belgian Bowl XXI			Anderlecht
16	May 31	18.00	West Flanders Tribes	25 - 20	Brussels Black Angels	Anderlecht

COLOR KEY:

- Win - Tie - Loss.

FFL 2008 Standings
	W	L	T	PCT	PF	PA	STK
West Flanders Tribes	8	0	0	1.00	277	59	W8
Brussels Black Angels	6	2	0	.750	271	67	W1
Antwerp Diamonds	5	3	0	.625	101	76	L1
Ghent Gators	5	3	0	.625	146	122	W3
Bornem Titans	3	5	0	.375	39	190	L1
Leuven Lions	1	7	0	.125	66	175	L4
Brussels Bulls	0	8	0	.000	36	247	L8

2008 Playoffs

Quarterfinals; May 11 @ Charleroi/Brussels
2	Charleroi Cougars	12
3	Antwerp Diamonds	43
2	Brussels Black Angels	36
3	Brussels Tigers	0

Semifinals; May 18, 2008 @ Ostend/Tournai
1	West Flanders Tribes	13
3	Antwerp Diamonds	6
1	Tournai Phoenix	6
2	Brussels Black Angels	17

Belgian Bowl XXI; May 31, 2008 @ Anderlecht
1	West Flanders Tribes	25
2	Brussels Black Angels	20

==== 2009 season ====
Tribes 2009 Season
Week	Date	Kickoff	Opponent	Results	Team record	Game Site
1	February 15	12:30	Brussels Bulls	6 – 16	1–0	Bornem
2	February 22	12:30	Brussels Black Angels	7 – 13	2–0	Heverlee
3	March 1	14:00	at Antwerp Diamonds	6 – 22	3–0	Berendrecht
4	March 8	14:00	at Ghent Gators	0 – 52	4–0	Ghent
5	March 15	14:00	at Bornem Titans	6 – 34	5–0	Bornem
6	March 22	14:00	Leuven Lions	57 – 6	6–0	Izegem
7	March 29	Bye				
8	April 5	15:00	Brussels Bulls	35 – 6	7–0	Ostend
9	April 11	Bye				
10	April 19	Bye				
11	April 26	15:00	Antwerp Diamonds	50 – 0	8–0	Ostend
12	May 3	Bye				
13	May 10	Playoffs Bye				
14	May 17	14:00	Charleroi Cougars	53 – 12	9–0	Ostend
15	May 24	Belgian Bowl Bye				
	Belgian Bowl XXII					
16	May 31	19:00	Tournai Phoenix	0 – 12	10–0	Brussels
	2009 Atlantic Cup					
	June 27		Dudelange Dragons	0 – 52	N/A	Berchem-Sainte-Agathe
	June 28		Dublin Rebels	13 – 15	N/A	Berchem-Sainte-Agathe

COLOR KEY:

- Win - Tie - Loss.

FFL 2009 Standings
	W	L	T	PCT	PF	PA	STK
West Flanders Tribes	8	0	0	1.00	279	37	W8
Brussels Black Angels	7	1	0	.875	207	75	W6
Bornem Titans	4	4	0	.500	141	166	W3
Brussels Bulls	3	5	0	.375	159	194	L3
Leuven Lions	2	5	1	.313	78	168	L4
Antwerp Diamonds	2	6	0	.250	82	191	L2
Ghent Gators	1	6	1	.188	119	230	L1

2009 Playoffs

Quarterfinals; May 10 @ Charleroi/Anderlecht
2	Charleroi Cougars	48
3	Bornem Titans	26
2	Brussels Black Angels	50
3	Brussels Tigers	0

Semifinals; May 17, 2009 @ Ostend/Tournai
1	West Flanders Tribes	53
2	Charleroi Cougars	12
1	Tournai Phoenix	20
2	Brussels Black Angels	7

Belgian Bowl XXII; May 31, 2009 @ Brussels
1	West Flanders Tribes	12
1	Tournai Phoenix	0

===== EFAF 2009 Atlantic Cup =====
The tribes won the 2009 Atlantic Cup. The tournament took place at Centre Sportif, Rue des Chalets 1, Berchem-Sainte-Agathe. The game field is made of artificial turf (4th generation).

Semifinals; June 27, 2009 @ Brussels
(Belgium) West Flanders Tribes	52
(Luxembourg) Dudelange Dragons	0
(Republic of Ireland) Dublin Rebels	9
(Netherlands) Amsterdam Panthers	0

Atlantic Cup Finals; June 28, 2009 @ Brussels
1	(Belgium) West Flanders Tribes	15
2	(Republic of Ireland) Dublin Rebels	13
Third place June 28, 2009 @ Brussels
3	(Netherlands) Amsterdam Panthers	60
4	(Luxembourg) Dudelange Dragons	0

==== 2010 season ====
Tribes 2010 Season
Week	Date	Kickoff	Visitors	Results	Home	Game Site
1	14-02	Bye week due to bad weather: (rescheduled 04-04)				
2	21-02	12.30	West Flanders Tribes	38 - 0	Leuven Lions	Leopoldsburg
3	28-02	15.00	Bornem Titans	(02-05)	West Flanders Tribes	Izegem
4	07-03	15.00	Antwerp Diamonds	0 - 28	West Flanders Tribes	Ostend
5	14-03	Bye				
6	21-03	14.00	Brussels Bulls	14 - 26	West Flanders Tribes	Izegem
7	28-03	15.00	West Flanders Tribes	33 - 7	Brussels Black Angels	Brussels
8	04-04	12.30	Limburg Shotguns	6 - 33	West Flanders Tribes	Bornem
9	11-04	12.30	West Flanders Tribes	29 - 9	Ghent Gators	Brussels
10	18-04	Bye				
11	25-04	12.30	Brussels Bulls	18 - 34	West Flanders Tribes	Bornem
12	02-05	15.00	Bornem Titans	23 - 42	West Flanders Tribes	Izegem
Post Season
13	09-05	Playoff Bye				
14	16-05	14.00	Tournai Phoenix	0 - 32	West Flanders Tribes	Ostend
15	29-05	Belgian Bowl Bye				
16	4-06	17.30	Belgian Bowl XXIII			St.Agathe-Berchem
16	4-06	17.30	West Flanders Tribes	36 - 6	Brussels Tigers	St.Agathe-Berchem

COLOR KEY:

- Win - Tie - Loss.
- The game on week 3 was rescheduled due to a frozen underground of the gamefield.

FFL 2010 Standings
	W	L	T	PCT	PF	PA	STK
West Flanders Tribes	8	0	0	1.00	263	77	W8
Brussels Black Angels	7	1	0	.875	179	66	W4
Bornem Titans	5	3	0	.625	192	94	L2
Ghent Gators	4	3	1	.500	127	100	T1
Antwerp Diamonds	3	5	0	.375	79	170	W1
Brussels Bulls	2	6	0	.250	95	197	L3
Leuven Lions	1	6	1	.125	46	144	T1
Limburg Shotguns	1	7	0	.125	76	208	L2

2010 Playoffs

Quarterfinals; May 9, 2010 @ Tournai/Brussels
2	Tournai Phoenix	20
3	Bornem Titans	13
2	Brussels Black Angels	49
3	Dudelange Dragons	0

Semifinals; May 16, 2010 @ Ostend/Evere
1	West Flanders Tribes	32
2	Tournai Phoenix	0
1	Brussels Tigers	34
2	Brussels Black Angels	7

Belgian Bowl XXIII; May 29, 2010 @ Brussels
1	West Flanders Tribes	36
1	Brussels Tigers	6

==== 2011 season ====
===== Pre-season =====
- Roots 2010 indoor American football tournament

- Champion of the Roots 2010 arena football Tournament with 3 wins and 1 tie.

===== 2011 season =====
Tribes 2011 Season
Week	Date	Kickoff	Visitors	Results	Home	Game Site
1	20-02	Bye				
2	27-02	Bye				
3	06-03	12.00	Brussels Black Angels	7 - 20	West Flanders Tribes	Bornem
4	13-03	12.00	West Flanders Tribes	40 - 13	Limburg Shotguns	Kessel-Lo
5	20-03	15.00	West Flanders Tribes	26-22	Brussels Bulls	St.Agathe-Berchem
6	27-03	Bye				
7	03-04	12.00	West Flanders Tribes	35 - 0	Antwerp Diamonds	Bornem
8	10-04	15.00	West Flanders Tribes	50 - 0	Leuven Lions	Kessel-Lo
9	17-04	15.00	Bornem Titans	14 - 31	West Flanders Tribes	Izegem
10	24-04	Easter Bye				
11	01-05	12.00	West Flanders Tribes	27 - 6	Bornem Titans	Anderlecht
12	08-05	15.00	Ghent Gators	0 - 54	West Flanders Tribes	Ostend
Post Season
13	15-05	Playoff Bye				
14	22-05	14.00	Brussels Bulls	21 - 27	West Flanders Tribes	Izegem
15	29-05	Belgian Bowl Bye				
16	4-06	17.30	Belgian Bowl XXIV			Ostend
16	4-06	17.30	Brussels Black Angels	14-20	West Flanders Tribes	Ostend
2011 Atlantic Cup
	25-06		West Flanders Tribes	12 - 6	Brussels Tigers	Dudelange
	26-06		West Flanders Tribes	2 - 47	Lelystad Commanders	Dudelange

COLOR KEY:

- Win - Tie - Loss.

2011 Regular Season Standings

FFL 2011 Standings
	W	L	T	PCT	PF	PA	STK
West Flanders Tribes	8	0	0	1.00	283	62	W8
Brussels Black Angels	6	1	1	.928	220	26	W5
Brussels Bulls	5	2	1	.688	253	52	W4
Bornem Titans	4	4	0	.500	114	142	L2
Antwerp Diamonds	3	5	0	.375	101	162	L2
Limburg Shotguns	2	6	0	.250	90	286	L4
Ghent Gators	2	6	0	.250	44	239	L1
Leuven Lions	1	7	0	.125	57	193	L7

2011 Playoffs

Quarterfinals; May 15 @ Charleroi/Anderlecht
2	Charleroi Cougars	0
3	Brussels Bulls	49
2	Brussels Black Angels	35
3	Ottignies Fighting Turtles	0

Semifinals; May 22, 2011 @ Izegem/Evere
1	West Flanders Tribes	27
3	Brussels Bulls	21
1	Brussels Tigers	10
2	Brussels Black Angels	38

Belgian Bowl XXIV; June 4, 2011 @ Ostend
1	West Flanders Tribes	20
2	Brussels Black Angels	14

===== EFAF 2011 Atlantic Cup =====
The Tribes will be participating at the 3rd edition of the Atlantic Cup from 24 until 26 June.

Semifinals; June 25, 2011 @ Dudelange
(Netherlands) Lelystad Commanders	44
(Luxembourg) Dudelange Dragons	0
(Belgium) West Flanders Tribes	12
(Belgium) Brussels Tigers	6

Atlantic Cup Finals; June 26, 2011 @ Dudelange
1	Lelystad Commanders	47
2	West Flanders Tribes	2
Third place June 26, 2011 @ Dudelange
3	(Belgium) Brussels Tigers	30
4	(Luxembourg) Dudelange Dragons	14

==== 2012 season ====
FFL 2012 Standings
	W	L	T	PCT	PF	PA	STK
Brussels Bulls	5	1	0	.833	117	55	L1
West Flanders Tribes	4	1	1	.667	157	80	W3
Antwerp Diamonds	4	1	1	.667	78	47	W1
Brussels Black Angels	4	2	0	.667	77	37	W3
Ghent Gators	2	4	0	.333	76	114	L2
Leuven Lions	0	5	1	.000	57	95	L4
Puurs Titans	0	5	1	.000	47	183	L3
Limburg Shotguns (*)	-	-	-	-	-	-	-

- (*)Limburg Shotguns gave forfait for the entire 2012 season. The games the Shotguns played became null and void, as if they were never played.

2012 Playoffs

Quarterfinals; May 20, 2012 @ Ottignies, Ostend
2	Corbais Fighting Turtles	13
3	Antwerp Diamonds	22
2	West Flanders Tribes	42
3	Liège Monarchs	0

Semifinals; May 27, 2012 @ Molenbeek, Evere
1	Brussels Bulls	9
3	Antwerp Diamonds	12
1	Brussels Tigers	34
2	West Flanders Tribes	7

Belgian Bowl XXV; June 9, 2012 @ Ostend
3	Antwerp Diamonds	6
1	Brussels Tigers	46

== Roster ==
West Flanders Tribes Roster
Quarterbacks: 13 (Belgium) Benedict Vermaut; Wide receivers: 1 (Belgium) Bas Laleman; 3 (Belgium) Benny Declerck; 10 (Belgium) Joey Vanlocke; 12 (Uzbekistan) Vitalik Goncharov; 22 (Belgium) Thomas Degroote; Running backs: 28 (United Kingdom) Frederik George; 29 (United Kingdom) Gregory "De Rosten" George; Cornerback: 14 (Belgium) J-F "Swatten" Vandendriessche; 21 (Belgium) Jerry Loones; 22 (Belgium) Thomas Degroote; 34 (Belgium) Wim Vanmarcke; Fullback: 40 (Belgium) Gregory "Peck" Ryckelynck	Tight ends: 89 (Belgium) Andy "Pizza" Brutyn; Linebackers: 32 (Belgium) Stefaan "Grendel" DeGrendele; 50 (Belgium) Benedict Verheyen; 51 (Belgium) Stephen Hollevoet; 52 (Belgium) Gregory Jamin; 53 (Belgium) Steve Stepman; Kicker/Punter: 1 (Belgium) Bas Laleman; 92 (Belgium) Stijn Dossche; Strong Safety: 33 (Belgium) Ringo Depestel; 81 (Belgium) Charley Monserez; Free Safety: 30 (Belgium) Kenneth Huyghe; 42 (Belgium) Bryan Germonpré	Offensive linemen: 50 (Belgium) Benedict Verheyen; 60 (Belgium) Willem DeMuynck; 62 (Belgium) Jens Mullebrouck; 63 (Belgium) Jeroen Vanhauwere; 66 (Belgium) Mark Vroman; 70 (Belgium) Joric Ongena; 71 (Belgium) Alain "Bassie" Debaille; 73 (Belgium) Aaron Vandenberghe; 77 (United States) Zach Bratkovich; 78 (Belgium) Tim "Titi" Vandenabeele; Defensive linemen: 74 (Belgium) Sven "Buzze" Buysse; 76 (Belgium) Aristo Mestdagh; 92 (Belgium) Stijn Dossche; 93 (Belgium) Glenn Michiels; 98 (Belgium) Lorenzo Janssens

=== Trivia ===
Two brothers

Two players have participated, during the past 20 seasons, as starters for the Tribes: the brothers Pieter and Willem Demuynck. Pieter started as a Defensive End and offensive lineman (iron man football in the early period.) The past 15 years he has been playing as a left guard. Willem started as a nose tackle and offensive lineman ( iron man), then remained nose tackle for 13 years and switched in 2008 to the offense as right guard. They have won 8 Belgian titles and several caps for the National team. Since June 28, 2009, the Atlantic Cup adds on to the record.

== Staff ==
West Flanders Tribes Staff
Manager: 55 (Belgium) Ben Machiels; Coaching staff: Head coach (Belgium) Andy Brutyn; Offensive Coördinator (United States) Mark Jasper; Defensive Coördinator (Belgium) Greg Jamin; Ass.Off.Coördinator (United Kingdom) Frederik George; Ass.Def.Coördinator (Belgium) Stefaan DeGrendele	Secretary: (Belgium) Glenn Michiels; Positional Coaching staff: Linebackers (Belgium) Greg Jamin; Linecoach (Belgium) Andy Brutyn; Passing Game (United States) Mark Jasper; Running Game (Belgium) Benedict Vermaut; Defensive Backs (Belgium) Stefaan DeGrendele

== Statistics ==
=== Performance since 2000 ===
This is an overview of the performance of the Tribes against the teams in the BFL during the BFL regular and post seasons from 2000 until 2011 and the EFAF Atlantic Cup's from 2009 until 2011.

Overview Tribes 2000-2012 performance
Opponent	W	L	T	PCT	Last match	Last win	Last loss
FFL Teams
Antwerp Diamonds	8	6	1	.533	April 1, 2012	April 3, 2011	May 14, 2006
Brussels Black Angels	14	2	2	.778	February 26, 2012	February 26, 2012	April 17, 2005
Brussels Bulls	7	1	0	.875	March 25, 2012	May 22, 2011	March 25, 2012
Ghent Gators	11	0	0	1.00	May 6, 2012	May 6, 2012	None
Leuven Lions	9	1	1	.818	April 29, 2012	April 29, 2012	March 14, 2004
Limburg Shotguns	2	0	0	1.00	March 13, 2011	March 13, 2011	None
Puurs Titans	9	0	0	1.00	April 22, 2012	April 22, 2012	None
LFFAB Teams
Brussels Tigers	6	3	0	.667	May 27, 2012	June 25, 2011	May 27, 2012
Charleroi Cougars	8	2	1	.727	May 17, 2009	May 17, 2009	April 18, 2004
Dudelange Dragons	1	0	0	1.00	June 27, 2009	June 27, 2009	None
Liège Monarchs	1	0	0	1.00	May 20, 2012	May 20, 2012	None
Tournai Phoenix	3	1	0	.750	May 16, 2010	May 16, 2010	March 3, 2002
Defunct BFL Teams
Flemalle Flames	3	3	0	.500	April 4, 2004	May 14, 2000	April 4, 2004
Liège Red Roosters	6	0	1	.857	March 28, 2004	April 6, 2003	None

=== Standings since 2000 ===
Tribes 2000-2012 standings
Season	Division	F	n°T	n°G	W	L	T	PCT	PF	PA	SP	PSR	PSPF	PSPA
2000	BFL	1	6	8	7	1	0	.875	202	67	135	3-0	82	36
2001	BFL Div I	1	4	5	5	0	0	1.00	76	29	47	2-0	64	14
2002	BFL West	3	4	8	4	3	1	.500	146	90	56	0-1	6	8
2003	BFL West	2	2	5	2	2	1	.400	74	68	6	n/a		
2004	BFL	8	10	8	2	5	1	.250	68	70	-2	n/p		
2005	FFL	3	4	6	2	3	1	.333	55	71	-16	n/p		
2006	FFL	1	6	7	6	1	0	.857	175	75	100	2-0	49	14
2007	FFL	1	6	7	6	0	1	.857	198	34	164	2-0	90	19
2008	FFL	1	7	8	8	0	0	1.00	277	59	218	2-0	38	26
2009	FFL	1	7	8	8	0	0	1.00	279	37	242	2-0	65	12
2010	FFL	1	8	8	8	0	0	1.00	263	77	186	2-0	68	6
2011	FFL	1	8	8	8	0	0	1.00	283	62	221	2-0	47	35
2012	FFL	2	8	6	4	1	1	.667	157	80	77	1-1	49	34
Total				92	70	16	6	.767	2253	819	1434	18-2	476	168

== Achievements ==
- 1999: Runner-up Champion of Belgium (as Izegem Redskins)
- 2000: Champion of Belgium (as Izegem Redskins)
- 2001: Champion of Belgium (perfect season 7-0-0) (as Izegem Redskins)
- 2006: Champion of Belgium and Champion of Flanders
- 2007: Champion of Belgium and Champion of Flanders (unbeaten season 9-0-1)
- 2008: Champion of Belgium and Champion of Flanders (perfect season 10-0-0)
- 2009: Champion of Belgium and Champion of Flanders (perfect season 10-0-0)
  - 2009: Atlantic Cup Champion
- 2010: Champion of Belgium and Champion of Flanders (perfect season 10-0-0)
- 2011: Champion of Belgium and Champion of Flanders (perfect season 10-0-0)
  - 2011: Atlantic Cup Runners-up
