= Leuven Lions =

American football team based in Leuven

Leuven

General information
- Founded: 1986
- Stadium: Leuven
- Headquartered: Leuven

League / conference affiliations
- Belgian Football League; Flemish American Football League

Championships
- League championships: 0; 1 (1992)
- Division championships: 0 None

Current uniform
Home

Away

The Leuven Lions are an American football team based in Leuven. The Lions are currently members of the Flemish American Football League (FAFL) conference in the Belgian Football League (BFL).

== History ==
=== 2004 season ===
BFL 2004 Standings
	W	L	T	PCT	PF	PA	STK
Antwerp Diamonds	8	0	0	1.00	306	0	W8
Leuven Lions	7	1	0	.875	161	43	
Brussels Black Angels	6	2	0	.750	143	46	
Charleroi Cougars	6	3	0	.667	75	115	
Liège Red Roosters	4	4	1	.444	92	161	
Tournai Phoenix	3	5	0	.375	101	94	
Flemalle Flames	3	5	1	.333	78	152	
West Flanders Tribes	2	5	1	.250	68	70	L1
Brussels Tigers	1	8	0	.111	12	177	
Ghent Gators	0	7	1	.000	32	207	

2004 Playoffs

Semifinals; May 23, 2004 @ Antwerp/Leuven
1	Antwerp Diamonds	20
4	Charleroi Cougars	10
2	Leuven Lions	31
3	Brussels Black Angels	20

Belgian Bowl XVII; June 6, 2004 @ Charleroi
1	Antwerp Diamonds	12
2	Leuven Lions	0

=== 2005–2010 ===
FFL 2005 Standings
	W	L	T	PCT	PF	PA	STK
Antwerp Diamonds	6	0	0	1.00	90	41	W6
Brussels Black Angels	3	2	1	.500	100	58	
West Flanders Tribes	2	3	1	.333	55	71	W1
Leuven Lions	0	6	0	.000	44	119	L6

FFL 2006 Standings
	W	L	T	PCT	PF	PA	STK
West Flanders Tribes	6	1	0	.857	175	75	L1
Brussels Black Angels	6	1	0	.857	199	39	
Antwerp Diamonds	5	2	0	.714			
Leuven Lions	3	4	0	.429	101	115	
Bornem Titans	1	6	0	.143	32	177	
Ghent Gators	0	7	0	.000	56	196	L7

FFL 2007 Standings
	W	L	T	PCT	PF	PA	STK
West Flanders Tribes	6	0	1	.857	198	34	W6
Brussels Black Angels	6	1	0	.857	148	51	
Antwerp Diamonds	4	3	0	.571	74	48	
Leuven Lions	2	3	1	.333			
Bornem Titans	1	6	0	.143	26	176	
Ghent Gators	0	6	0	.000			L6

FFL 2008 Standings
	W	L	T	PCT	PF	PA	STK
West Flanders Tribes	8	0	0	1.00	277	59	W8
Brussels Black Angels	6	2	0	.750	271	67	W1
Antwerp Diamonds	5	3	0	.625	101	76	L1
Ghent Gators	5	3	0	.625	146	122	W3
Bornem Titans	3	5	0	.375	39	190	L1
Leuven Lions	1	7	0	.125	66	175	L4
Brussels Bulls	0	8	0	.000	36	247	L8

FFL 2009 Standings
	W	L	T	PCT	PF	PA	STK
West Flanders Tribes	8	0	0	1.00	279	37	W8
Brussels Black Angels	7	1	0	.875	207	75	W6
Bornem Titans	4	4	0	.500	141	166	W3
Brussels Bulls	3	5	0	.375	159	194	L3
Leuven Lions	2	5	1	.313	78	168	L4
Antwerp Diamonds	2	6	0	.250	82	191	L2
Ghent Gators	1	6	1	.188	119	230	L1

FFL 2010 Standings
	W	L	T	PCT	PF	PA	STK
West Flanders Tribes	8	0	0	1.00	263	77	W8
Brussels Black Angels	7	1	0	.875	179	66	W4
Bornem Titans	5	3	0	.625	192	94	L2
Ghent Gators	4	3	1	.500	127	100	T1
Antwerp Diamonds	3	5	0	.375	79	170	W1
Brussels Bulls	2	6	0	.250	95	197	L3
Leuven Lions	1	6	1	.125	46	144	T1
Limburg Shotguns	1	7	0	.125	76	208	L2

=== 2011 season ===
FFL 2011 Standings
	W	L	T	PCT	PF	PA	STK
West Flanders Tribes	8	0	0	1.00	283	62	W8
Brussels Black Angels	6	1	1	.928	220	26	W5
Brussels Bulls	5	2	1	.688	253	52	W4
Bornem Titans	4	4	0	.500	114	142	L2
Antwerp Diamonds	3	5	0	.375	101	162	L2
Limburg Shotguns	2	6	0	.250	90	286	L4
Ghent Gators	2	6	0	.250	44	239	L1
Leuven Lions	1	7	0	.125	57	193	L7

=== 2012 season ===
FFL 2012 Standings
	W	L	T	PCT	PF	PA	STK
Brussels Bulls	5	1	0	.833	117	55	L1
West Flanders Tribes	4	1	1	.667	157	80	W3
Antwerp Diamonds	4	1	1	.667	78	47	W1
Brussels Black Angels	4	2	0	.667	77	37	W3
Ghent Gators	2	4	0	.333	76	114	L2
Leuven Lions	0	5	1	.000	57	95	L4
Puurs Titans	0	5	1	.000	47	183	L3
Limburg Shotguns (*)	-	-	-	-	-	-	-

- (*)Limburg Shotguns gave forfait for the entire 2012 season. The games the Shotguns played became null and void, as if they were never played.

=== 2013 season ===
FFL 2013 Standings
	W	L	T	PCT	PF	PA	STK
Brussels Bulls	6	0	0	1.00	178	14	W6
Brussels Black Angels	5	1	0	.833	127	29	W3
Puurs Titans	3	2	0	.600	81	54	W1
Leuven Lions	2	3	1	.417	56	96	L2
Antwerp Diamonds	1	3	1	.300	49	105	T1
Ghent Gators	1	4	1	.250	46	126	L2
Izegem Tribes	0	5	1	.083	49	162	T1

=== 2014 season ===
FAFL 2014 Standings
	W	L	T	PCT	PF	PA	STK
Ghent Gators	7	1	0	.875	288	65	W2
Brussels Black Angels	7	1	0	.875	226	66	W7
Ostend Pirates	6	2	0	.750	196	84	W4
Brussels Bulls	5	3	0	.625	158	73	W2
Leuven Lions	4	4	0	.500	148	138	W1
Puurs Titans	3	5	0	.375	84	219	L3
Limburg Shotguns	2	5	1	.313	80	208	L2
Izegem Tribes	1	6	1	.188	90	203	L3
Antwerp Diamonds	0	8	0	.000	51	265	L8

=== 2024–2025 season ===
2025 Lions Senior
Date	Opponent	PF	PA	Result	RUSH ATT	RUSH YD	RUSH AVG	RUSH TD	PASS ATT	PASS COMP	COMP %	PASS YDS	PASS TD	PASS INT	DEF SACKS	DEF TFL	DEF INT
23 Feb 2025	Andenne Bears	14	18	L	25	103	4.1	1	14	5	35.7	53	1	1	2	4.5	0
16 Mar 2025	Verviers Mustangs	0	29	L	12	21	1.8	0	12	3	25.0	17	0	1	1.5	1.5	0
13 Apr 2025	Brugges Broncos	17	8	W	26	16	.6	0	27	9	33.3	103	1	0	9.5	12	7
27 Apr 2025	Antwerp Spartans	0	19	L	19	21	1.1	0	25	10	40.0	96	0	2	0	7	0
11 May 2025	Ostend Pirates	0	42	L	25	-18	-.7	0	19	5	26.3	29	0	1	2	9.5	1
25 May 2025	Liege Monarchs	31	18	W	28	161	5.8	2	30	16	53.3	291	1	2	6	6	3
8 Jun 2025	Charleroi Coal Miners	6	44	L	14	17	1.2	1	21	6	28.6	41	0	0	4	9	0
2025 season		68	178	2-5	149	321	2.2	4	148	54	36.5	630	3	7	25	49.5	11

=== 2025–2026 season ===
2026 Lions Senior
Date	Opponent	PF	PA	Result	RUSH ATT	RUSH YD	RUSH AVG	RUSH TD	PASS ATT	PASS COMP	COMP %	PASS YDS	PASS TD	PASS INT	DEF SACKS	DEF TFL	DEF INT
1 Mar 2026	Brugges Broncos	30	28	W	40	330	6.2	4	5	1	20	35	0	2	1.5	6.5	1
15 Mar 2026	@ Andenne Bears*	9	23	L	29	60	2.1	0	4	3	75	55	0	0	1	7	2
29 Mar 2026	Ostend Pirates	9	0	W	42	33	1.3	1	10	4	40	111	0	2	2	9	1
19 Apr 2026	@ Limburg Shotguns	12	8	W	40	130	3.3	2	16	6	37.5	128	0	1	5	6.5	1
24 May 2026	Brussels Tigers	15	20	L				1					1				
7 Jun 2026	@ Liege Monarchs*	12	24	L	28	138	4.9	0	4	6	66.7	79	1	0	1	3.5	1
2026 season		87	103	3-3	197	745	3.9	8	45	20	44.4	441	2	5	11.5	36	7

The 2025–2026 season marked a turning point for the Leuven Lions program. While the win-loss record does not fully reflect the progress made, this season laid the foundation for the future of Lions football through a new offensive identity, improved team culture, increased participation, and a renewed commitment to physical football.

== A new offensive identity ==
Entering the season, the Lions made the difficult decision to transition away from a Wing-T based offense that had gradually become increasingly pass-oriented and install the Wishbone offense as the foundation of the program.

The Wishbone is an offensive system that requires discipline, timing, repetition, and trust from all eleven players. It is not an offense that produces immediate results, but one that rewards teams willing to commit to the process.

Despite the steep learning curve, the Lions embraced the challenge.

Compared to the previous season:

- Rushing yards increased from 321 to 744 (+132%)
- Rushing touchdowns increased from 4 to 7 (+75%)
- Yards per carry improved from 2.2 to 3.8 (+73%)
- Total offensive production increased from 951 to 1,185 yards despite playing one fewer game in the available statistics

The numbers tell the story of a team becoming more physical and more effective on the ground.

It is also important to note that the available season statistics do not include approximately 2½ quarters of the Tigers game. That contest was one of the Lions' strongest offensive performances of the season and would likely add an estimated 70–100 rushing yards and at least one additional rushing touchdown to the season totals. Had that data been available, the offensive improvements would be even more significant.

== Defensive progress ==
While the offense was learning a completely new system, the defense quietly became one of the strengths of the team.

Compared to the previous season, the Lions defense:

- Reduced opponent total offense from 1,501 yards to 866 yards
- Reduced opponent rushing yards from 888 to 293 yards
- Held opponents to just 2.3 yards per rushing attempt
- Increased interceptions from 11 forced by opponents last season to 5 takeaways this season while matching opponents in turnover production

Most notably, the Lions transformed from a defense that struggled to stop the run into one of the better run defenses in the league.

The physicality, effort, and discipline displayed throughout the season created a foundation that can continue to build moving forward.

== Changing the culture ==
Perhaps the most important achievement of the season cannot be measured by yards or touchdowns.

The culture of the program changed.

Throughout the year, player commitment steadily increased. Practice attendance more than doubled from the beginning of the season, with the team consistently averaging approximately 18–22 players per practice by the end of the year.

This growth was not accidental.

Players bought into the vision of the program. They committed to learning a difficult offense, embraced tougher practices, accepted accountability, and continued showing up week after week. The result was a team that became closer, tougher, and more invested in the success of the Lions than at any point in recent years.

The growth in attendance demonstrated something every successful program needs before it can consistently win games: belief.

== Looking forward ==
The 2025–2026 season was never just about wins and losses.

It was about establishing an identity.

The Lions became a more physical football team. They learned a system designed to control games on the ground. They improved defensively. They increased participation. Most importantly, they built a culture that players wanted to be part of.

The statistics show improvement. The attendance shows commitment. The future shows promise.

The foundation has been laid.

== Statistics ==
=== Performance (2000–2011) ===
This is an overview of the performance of the Lions against the teams in the FFL during the BFL regular and post seasons from 2000 until 2011.

Overview Lions 2000-2011 performance
Opponent	W	L	T	PCT	Last match	Last win	Last loss
FFL Teams
Antwerp Diamonds	2	9	0	.182			
Bornem Titans	3	5	0	.375			
Brussels Black Angels	1	11	0	.083	February 27, 2011		February 27, 2011
Brussels Bulls	2	2	0	.500			
Ghent Gators	5	2	2	.556			
Limburg Shotguns	0	2	0	.000	April 3, 2011	None	April 3, 2011
West Flanders Tribes	1	8	1	.100	April 10, 2011	March 14, 2004	April 10, 2011

== Achievements ==
- Overview achievements BFL Teams
