= 2011 BFL season =

- Total # of teams: 13
- Regular season: February 13
- Playoffs: May 15 – May 22
- Belgian Bowl: Belgian Bowl XXIV
- Belgian Bowl Date: June 4
- Belgian Bowl Location: Ostend
- Belgian Bowl Champions: West Flanders Tribes
- FFL Champions: West Flanders Tribes
- LFFAB Champions: Brussels Tigers

The 2011 season of the Belgian Football League (BFL) is the regular season played in the Belgium. The championship game was Belgian Bowl XXIV.

== Regular season ==
=== Regular season overview ===
The BFL schedules two games at one location for saving on transportationcosts for referees and the costs of renting an ambulance and first aid responders. Half of the time, teams are playing virtually at home but actually play at the hosting team's homefield due to these costsaving measures.

FFL
Week	Date	Visitors	Results	Home
1	20-02	Brussels Bulls; Leuven Lions	14–20; 23–0	Antwerp Diamonds; Ghent Gators
2	27-02	Brussels Black Angels; Bornem Titans	18–0; 7–6	Leuven Lions; Antwerp Diamonds
3	06-03	Brussels Bulls; Antwerp Diamonds; Brussels Black Angels; Ghent Gators	33–0 (27/03); 7–20; 7–14	Leuven Lions; Limburg Shotguns; West Flanders Tribes; Bornem Titans
4	13-03	Brussels Bulls; Antwerp Diamonds; West Flanders Tribes; Bornem Titans	0–0; 12–15; 40–13; 27–13	Brussels Black Angels; Ghent Gators; Limburg Shotguns; Leuven Lions
5	20-03	Bornem Titans; West Flanders Tribes; Ghent Gators; Leuven Lions	6–19; 26–22; 6–26; 0–35	Brussels Black Angels; Brussels Bulls; Limburg Shotguns; Antwerp Diamonds
6	27-03	Antwerp Diamonds	28–19	Limburg Shotguns
7	03-04	Limburg Shotguns; Ghent Gators; West Flanders Tribes; Brussels Bulls	20–14; 0–49; 35–0; 27–0	Leuven Lions; Brussels Black Angels; Antwerp Diamonds; Bornem Titans
8	10-04	Antwerp Diamonds; Ghent Gators; Bornem Titans; West Flanders Tribes	0–54; 6–54; 40–12; 50–00	Brussels Black Angels; Brussels Bulls; Limburg Shotguns; Leuven Lions
9	17-04	Leuven Lions; Bornem Titans; Brussels Black Angels; Brussels Bulls	7–10; 14–31; 18–0; 53–0	Ghent Gators; West Flanders Tribes; Antwerp Diamonds; Limburg Shotguns
11	01-05	West Flanders Tribes; Limburg Shotguns	27–6; 0–55	Bornem Titans; Brussels Black Angels
12	08-05	Limburg Shotguns; Ghent Gators	0–50 (FF); 0–54	Brussels Bulls; West Flanders Tribes

LFFAB
Date	Match	Visitors	Results	Home
13-02	Match 1	Charleroi Cougars; Andenne Bears	14–6; 8–8	Ottignies Fighting Turtles; Liège Monarchs
20-02	Match 2	Charleroi Cougars; Tournai Phoenix*	0–48; 14–12	Brussels Tigers; Ottignies Fighting Turtles
27-02	Match 3	Liège Monarchs; Brussels Tigers	12–0; 50–0 (FF 3QT)	Andenne Bears; Tournai Phoenix*
06-03	Match 4	Andenne Bears; Charleroi Cougars	6–38; 20–6	Ottignies Fighting Turtles; Liège Monarchs
13-03	Match 5	Tournai Phoenix*; Ottignies Fighting Turtles	33–6; 2–28	Charleroi Cougars; Brussels Tigers
27-03	Match 6	Andenne Bears; Liège Monarchs	0–82; 0–34	Tournai Phoenix*; Brussels Tigers
03-04	Match 7	Liège Monarchs; Charleroi Cougars	14–47; 50–0 (FF 4QT)	Ottignies Fighting Turtles; Andenne Bears
10-04	Match 8	Ottignies Fighting Turtles; Brussels Tigers	50–0 (FF 4QT); 47–0	Tournai Phoenix*; Charleroi Cougars
17-04	Match 9	Tournai Phoenix*; Andenne Bears	0–50 (FF); 0–80	Liège Monarchs; Brussels Tigers
01-05	Match 10	Tournai Phoenix*; Liège Monarchs	0–50 (FF); 18–33	Brussels Tigers; Charleroi Cougars
08-05	Match 11	Ottignies Fighting Turtles	32–2	Andenne Bears

- (*)Tournai phoenix gave forfait for the entire 2011 season. The games Tournai played became null and void, as if they were never played.

The match on week 3 in Leopoldsburg (Shotgun's homefield) was suspended due to the absence of an ambulance. In the first quarter a player was driven away to the hospital without a replacement for the leaving ambulance. Rules state that a game cannot continue without an emergency vehicle. The game was rescheduled to March 27.

=== Regular-season standings ===
FFL 2011 Standings
	W	L	T	PCT	PF	PA	STK
West Flanders Tribes	8	0	0	1.00	283	62	W8
Brussels Black Angels	6	1	1	.928	220	26	W5
Brussels Bulls	5	2	1	.688	253	52	W4
Bornem Titans	4	4	0	.500	114	142	L2
Antwerp Diamonds	3	5	0	.375	101	162	L2
Limburg Shotguns	2	6	0	.250	90	286	L4
Ghent Gators	2	6	0	.250	44	239	L1
Leuven Lions	1	7	0	.125	57	193	L7

LFFAB 2011 Standings
	W	L	T	PCT	PF	PA	STK
Brussels Tigers	6	0	0	1.00	257	2	W6
Charleroi Cougars	3	3	0	.500	90	140	
Ottignies Fighting Turtles	3	3	0	.500	155	76	
Liège Monarchs	2	3	1	.333	90	109	
Andenne Bears	0	5	1	.167	16	220	L5
Tournai Phoenix*	-	-	-	-	-	-	-
Dudelange Dragons**	-	-	-	-	-	-	-
La Louvière Wolves**	-	-	-	-	-	-	-

- (*)Tournai phoenix gave forfait for the entire 2011 season. The games Tournai played became null and void, as if they were never played.
- (**) La Louvière Wolves and Dudelange Dragons did not participate this season.

– clinched seed to the playoffs

== Postseason ==
Belgian Bowl XXIV
Brussels Black Angels (FFL)	West Flanders Tribes (FFL)
14	20
	1	2	3	4	Total
BBA	7	0	0	7	14
WFT	7	7	0	6	20
- Date: June 4
- Stadium: Sportpark De Schorre; Oostende

Quarterfinals; May 15 @ Charleroi/Anderlecht
2	Charleroi Cougars	0
3	Brussels Bulls	49
2	Brussels Black Angels	35
3	Ottignies Fighting Turtles	0

Semifinals; May 22, 2011 @ Izegem/Evere
1	West Flanders Tribes	27
3	Brussels Bulls	21
1	Brussels Tigers	10
2	Brussels Black Angels	38

Belgian Bowl XXIV; June 4, 2011 @ Ostend
1	West Flanders Tribes	20
2	Brussels Black Angels	14

== Most Valuable Players ==
=== MVP regular season ===
- BFL MVP: #29 Gregory "De Rosten" George
- FFL MVP: #29 Gregory "De Rosten" George

=== MVP Playoffs ===
- MVP Black Angels: #55 Soufian Aissati
- MVP Tribes: #92 Stijn Dossche
