= 2006 BFL season =

- Total # of teams: 10
- Regular season: February 26
- Playoffs: May 7 – May 21
- Belgian Bowl: Belgian Bowl XIX
- Belgian Bowl Date: June 4
- Belgian Bowl Location: Brussels
- Belgian Bowl Champions: West Flanders Tribes
- FFL Champions: West Flanders Tribes
- LFFAB Champions: Tournai Phoenix

The 2006 season of the Belgian Football League (BFL) is the regular season played in the Belgium. The West Flanders Tribes won Belgian Bowl XIX against the Tournai Phoenix by a score of 23-14.

== Regular season ==
=== Regular season standings ===
FFL 2006 Standings
	W	L	T	PCT	PF	PA	STK
West Flanders Tribes	6	1	0	.857	175	75	L1
Brussels Black Angels	6	1	0	.857	199	39	
Antwerp Diamonds	5	2	0	.714			
Leuven Lions	3	4	0	.429	101	115	
Bornem Titans	1	6	0	.143	32	177	
Ghent Gators	0	7	0	.000	56	196	L7

LFFAB 2006 Standings
	W	L	T	PCT	PF	PA	STK
Tournai Phoenix	5	0	0	1.00	188	0	W5
Charleroi Cougars	3	3	0	.500	122	61	
Liège Red Roosters	3	2	0	.600	116	83	
Andenne Bears	0	6	0	.000	0	282	L6

- clinched seed to the playoffs

== Postseason ==
Belgian Bowl XIX
Tournai Phoenix (LFFAB)	West Flanders Tribes (FFL)
14	23
	1	2	3	4	Total
TOU	7	0	7	0	14
W F	8	0	8	7	23
- Date: June 4
- Stadium: Forest Stadium; Brussel

LFFAB-only playoff round May 7, 2006 @ Charleroi
2	Charleroi Cougars	28
3	Liège Monarchs	0
1	Tournai Phoenix	50
4	Andenne Bears	0

Semifinals; May 21, 2006 @ Ostend/Tournai
1	West Flanders Tribes	26
2	Charleroi Cougars	0
1	Tournai Phoenix	14
2	Brussels Black Angels	9

Belgian Bowl XIX; June 4, 2006 @ Brussels
1	West Flanders Tribes	23
1	Tournai Phoenix	14
