= 2008 BFL season =

- Total # of teams: 14
- Regular season: February 17
- Playoffs: May 11 – May 18
- Belgian Bowl: Belgian Bowl XXI
- Belgian Bowl Date: May 31
- Belgian Bowl Location: Anderlecht
- Belgian Bowl Champions: West Flanders Tribes
- FFL Champions: West Flanders Tribes
- LFFAB Champions: Tournai Phoenix

The 2008 season of the Belgian Football League (BFL) was the regular season played in the Belgium. The West Flanders Tribes had a perfect season with 8 wins and no losses and won Belgian Bowl XXI against the Brussels Black Angels by a score of 25–20. The Belgian Bowl victory was the Tribes 3rd in a row.

== Regular season ==
=== Regular season standings ===
FFL 2008 Standings
	W	L	T	PCT	PF	PA	STK
West Flanders Tribes	8	0	0	1.00	277	59	W8
Brussels Black Angels	6	2	0	.750	271	67	W1
Antwerp Diamonds	5	3	0	.625	101	76	L1
Ghent Gators	5	3	0	.625	146	122	W3
Bornem Titans	3	5	0	.375	39	190	L1
Leuven Lions	1	7	0	.125	66	175	L4
Brussels Bulls	0	8	0	.000	36	247	L8

LFFAB 2008 Standings
	W	L	T	PCT	PF	PA	STK
Tournai Phoenix	8	0	0	1.00	372	12	W8
Charleroi Cougars	6	2	0	.750	288	119	
Brussels Tigers	6	2	0	.750	352	109	
Andenne Bears	5	3	0	.375	92	200	
Liège Red Roosters	3	5	0	.375	81	238	
La Louvière Wolves	2	6	0	.250	59	281	
Flemalle Flames	0	8	0	.000	40	298	L8

- clinched seed to the playoffs

== Postseason ==
Belgian Bowl XXI
West Flanders Tribes (FFL)	Brussels Black Angels (FFL)
25	20
	1	2	3	4	Total
WFT	0	19	0	6	25
BBA	0	13	0	7	20
- Date: May 31, 2008
- Stadium: Jesse Owens; Anderlecht

Quarterfinals; May 11 @ Charleroi/Brussels
2	Charleroi Cougars	12
3	Antwerp Diamonds	43
2	Brussels Black Angels	36
3	Brussels Tigers	0

Semifinals; May 18, 2008 @ Ostend/Tournai
1	West Flanders Tribes	13
3	Antwerp Diamonds	6
1	Tournai Phoenix	6
2	Brussels Black Angels	17

Belgian Bowl XXI; May 31, 2008 @ Anderlecht
1	West Flanders Tribes	25
2	Brussels Black Angels	20
