= Limburg Shotguns =

American football team from Belgium

General information
- Founded: 2008
- Stadium: Korspel, Beringen
- Headquartered: Limburg

League / conference affiliations
- Belgian Football League; Flemish American Football League

Championships
- League championships: 0; 1 (2021)
- Division championships: 0 None

Current uniform
Home

Away

The Limburg Shotguns (Flemish pronunciation: [ˈlɪmbʏr(ə)x ˈɕɔtxʏns]) are an American football team based in Korspel, Beringen, Limburg. The Shotguns are currently the newest members of the Flemish American Football League (FAFL) conference in the Belgian Football League (BFL) since the 2010 regular season. In 2022 they joined the new created BNL.

== History ==
=== 2010 season ===
Shotguns 2010 Season
| Week | Date | Kickoff | Visitors | Results | Home | Game Site |
|---|---|---|---|---|---|---|
| 1 | 14-02 | Bye week due to bad weather: (rescheduled 04-04) | | | | |
| 2 | 21-02 | 15.00 | Bornem Titans | 36 - 12 | Limburg Shotguns | Leopoldsburg |
| 3 | 28-02 | 12.30 | Limburg Shotguns | (02-05) | Brussels Black Angels | Izegem |
| 4 | 07-03 | Bye | | | | |
| 5 | 14-03 | 12.30 | Brussels Bulls | 35 - 14 | Limburg Shotguns | Brussels (BBA) |
| 6 | 21-03 | 16.00 | Limburg Shotguns | 14 - 20 | Ghent Gators | Ghent |
| 7 | 28-03 | 12.30 | Antwerp Diamonds | 24 - 6 | Limburg Shotguns | Heverlee, Leuven |
| 8 | 04-04 | 12.30 | Limburg Shotguns | 6 - 33 | West Flanders Tribes | Bornem |
| 9 | 11-04 | 14.00 | Leuven Lions | 14 - 18 | Limburg Shotguns | Leopoldsburg |
| 10 | 18-04 | 12.30 | Limburg Shotguns | 6 - 13 | Ghent Gators | Brussels (BB) |
| 11 | 25-04 | Bye | | | | |
| 12 | 02-05 | 12.30 | Limburg Shotguns | 0 - 33 | Brussels Black Angels | Izegem |

COLOR KEY:

- Win - Tie - Loss.
- The game on week 3 was rescheduled due to a frozen underground of the gamefield.

FFL 2010 Standings
| | W | L | T | PCT | PF | PA | STK |
|---|---|---|---|---|---|---|---|
| West Flanders Tribes | 8 | 0 | 0 | 1.00 | 263 | 77 | W8 |
| Brussels Black Angels | 7 | 1 | 0 | .875 | 179 | 66 | W4 |
| Bornem Titans | 5 | 3 | 0 | .625 | 192 | 94 | L2 |
| Ghent Gators | 4 | 3 | 1 | .500 | 127 | 100 | T1 |
| Antwerp Diamonds | 3 | 5 | 0 | .375 | 79 | 170 | W1 |
| Brussels Bulls | 2 | 6 | 0 | .250 | 95 | 197 | L3 |
| Leuven Lions | 1 | 6 | 1 | .125 | 46 | 144 | T1 |
| Limburg Shotguns | 1 | 7 | 0 | .125 | 76 | 208 | L2 |

=== 2011 season ===
Preseason

- Roots 2010 indoor American football tournament - arena football

FFL 2011 Standings
| | W | L | T | PCT | PF | PA | STK |
|---|---|---|---|---|---|---|---|
| West Flanders Tribes | 8 | 0 | 0 | 1.00 | 283 | 62 | W8 |
| Brussels Black Angels | 6 | 1 | 1 | .928 | 220 | 26 | W5 |
| Brussels Bulls | 5 | 2 | 1 | .688 | 253 | 52 | W4 |
| Bornem Titans | 4 | 4 | 0 | .500 | 114 | 142 | L2 |
| Antwerp Diamonds | 3 | 5 | 0 | .375 | 101 | 162 | L2 |
| Limburg Shotguns | 2 | 6 | 0 | .250 | 90 | 286 | L4 |
| Ghent Gators | 2 | 6 | 0 | .250 | 44 | 239 | L1 |
| Leuven Lions | 1 | 7 | 0 | .125 | 57 | 193 | L7 |

=== 2012 season ===
FFL 2012 Standings
| | W | L | T | PCT | PF | PA | STK |
|---|---|---|---|---|---|---|---|
| Brussels Bulls | 5 | 1 | 0 | .833 | 117 | 55 | L1 |
| West Flanders Tribes | 4 | 1 | 1 | .667 | 157 | 80 | W3 |
| Antwerp Diamonds | 4 | 1 | 1 | .667 | 78 | 47 | W1 |
| Brussels Black Angels | 4 | 2 | 0 | .667 | 77 | 37 | W3 |
| Ghent Gators | 2 | 4 | 0 | .333 | 76 | 114 | L2 |
| Leuven Lions | 0 | 5 | 1 | .000 | 57 | 95 | L4 |
| Puurs Titans | 0 | 5 | 1 | .000 | 47 | 183 | L3 |
| Limburg Shotguns (*) | - | - | - | - | - | - | - |

- (*)Limburg Shotguns gave forfait for the entire 2012 season. The games the Shotguns played became null and void, as if they were never played.

=== 2014 season ===
FAFL 2014 Standings
| | W | L | T | PCT | PF | PA | STK |
|---|---|---|---|---|---|---|---|
| Ghent Gators | 7 | 1 | 0 | .875 | 288 | 65 | W2 |
| Brussels Black Angels | 7 | 1 | 0 | .875 | 226 | 66 | W7 |
| Ostend Pirates | 6 | 2 | 0 | .750 | 196 | 84 | W4 |
| Brussels Bulls | 5 | 3 | 0 | .625 | 158 | 73 | W2 |
| Leuven Lions | 4 | 4 | 0 | .500 | 148 | 138 | W1 |
| Puurs Titans | 3 | 5 | 0 | .375 | 84 | 219 | L3 |
| Limburg Shotguns | 2 | 5 | 1 | .313 | 80 | 208 | L2 |
| Izegem Tribes | 1 | 6 | 1 | .188 | 90 | 203 | L3 |
| Antwerp Diamonds | 0 | 8 | 0 | .000 | 51 | 265 | L8 |

== Statistics ==
=== Performance (2010–2011) ===
This is an overview of the performance of the Shotguns against the teams in the BFL during the BFL regular and post seasons from 2010 until 2011.

Overview Shotguns 2010-2011 performance
| Opponent | W | L | T | PCT | Last match | Last win | Last loss |
FFL Teams
| Antwerp Diamonds | 0 | 2 | 0 | .000 | March 27, 2011 | None | March 27, 2011 |
| Bornem Titans | 0 | 2 | 0 | .000 | April 10, 2011 | None | April 10, 2011 |
| Brussels Black Angels | 0 | 2 | 0 | .000 | May 1, 2011 | None | May 1, 2011 |
| Brussels Bulls | 0 | 3 | 0 | .000 | May 8, 2011 (FF) | None | May 8, 2011 (FF) |
| Ghent Gators | 1 | 2 | 0 | .333 | March 20, 2011 | March 20, 2011 | April 18, 2010 |
| Leuven Lions | 2 | 0 | 0 | 1.00 | April 3, 2011 | April 3, 2011 | None |
| West Flanders Tribes | 0 | 2 | 0 | .000 | March 13, 2011 | None | March 13, 2011 |
LFFAB Teams
No match played yet

== Achievements ==
- Overview achievements BFL Teams
