= Belgian Bowl XIX =

Tournai Phoenix (LFFAB)	West Flanders Tribes (FFL)
14	23
	1	2	3	4	Total
TOU	7	7	0	0	14
W F	8	8	0	7	23
- Date: June 4, 2006
- Stadium: Forest Stadium; Brussel

Belgian Bowl XIX was played in 2006 and was won by the West Flanders Tribes, this was their third Championship title. This title will be the first in their five time winning streak in the Belgian Bowl.

== Playoffs ==
The 2 teams that play in the Belgian Bowl are the winners of the Belgian Bowl playoffs.

LFFAB-only playoff round May 7, 2006 @ Charleroi
2	Charleroi Cougars	28
3	Liège Monarchs	0
1	Tournai Phoenix	50
4	Andenne Bears	0

Semifinals; May 21, 2006 @ Ostend/Tournai
1	West Flanders Tribes	26
2	Charleroi Cougars	0
1	Tournai Phoenix	14
2	Brussels Black Angels	9

Belgian Bowl XIX; June 4, 2006 @ Brussels
1	West Flanders Tribes	23
1	Tournai Phoenix	14
