= Belgian Bowl XXIII =

| West Flanders Tribes (FFL) | Brussels Tigers (LFFAB) |
|---|---|
| 36 | 6 |
| | 1 | 2 | 3 | 4 | Total |
|---|---|---|---|---|---|
| WFT | 15 | 7 | 7 | 7 | 36 |
| BT | 0 | 0 | 0 | 6 | 6 |
- Date: May 29
- Stadium: Centre Sportif, Berchem-Sainte-Agathe; Brussels

The Belgian Bowl XXIII took place on May 29, 2010. The West Flanders Tribes won their 5th consecutive title, making a first in European football history.

== 2010 Playoffs ==
The 2 teams that played in the Belgian Bowl were the winners of the Semi-Finals. West Flanders Tribes and Brussels Tigers received byes straight into the Semi-Finals since they won seasonal play in the FFL and LFFAB, respectively.

Quarterfinals; May 9, 2010 @ Tournai/Brussels
2 | Tournai Phoenix | 20
3 | Bornem Titans | 13
2 | Brussels Black Angels | 49
3 | Dudelange Dragons | 0

Semifinals; May 16, 2010 @ Ostend/Evere
1 | West Flanders Tribes | 32
2 | Tournai Phoenix | 0
1 | Brussels Tigers | 34
2 | Brussels Black Angels | 7

Belgian Bowl XXIII; May 29, 2010 @ Brussels
1 | West Flanders Tribes | 36
1 | Brussels Tigers | 6
