= Belgian Bowl XXIV =

Brussels Black Angels (FFL)	West Flanders Tribes (FFL)
14	20
	1	2	3	4	Total
BBA	7	0	0	7	14
WFT	7	7	0	6	20
- Date: June 4
- Stadium: Sportpark De Schorre; Ostend

The Belgian Bowl XXIV was held on June 4, 2011 in Ostend. The West Flanders Tribes were the reigning champion and were defending their title against the Brussels Black Angels. This was the Third time the Tribes and the Black Angels faced each other in the Belgian Bowl (2007, 2008). The Tribes won the game on a windy but sunny gameday with 1350 spectators.

== 2011 Playoffs ==
The 2 teams that played in the Belgian Bowl were the winners of the Semi Finals. West Flanders Tribes and Brussels Tigers received byes straight into the Semi Finals since they were the winners of seasonal play in the FFL and LFFAB respectively. The Quarterfinals were played on 15 May and the Semi Finals on 22 May on the homefields of the highest seeded teams.

Quarterfinals; May 15 @ Charleroi/Anderlecht
2	Charleroi Cougars	0
3	Brussels Bulls	49
2	Brussels Black Angels	35
3	Ottignies Fighting Turtles	0

Semifinals; May 22, 2011 @ Izegem/Evere
1	West Flanders Tribes	27
3	Brussels Bulls	21
1	Brussels Tigers	10
2	Brussels Black Angels	38

Belgian Bowl XXIV; June 4, 2011 @ Ostend
1	West Flanders Tribes	20
2	Brussels Black Angels	14

== Most Valuable Players ==
- MVP Black Angels: #55 Soufian Aissati
- MVP Tribes: #92 Stijn Dossche

== Game summary ==
The Tribes won the toss and chose to receive the kickoff.

=== Scoring Players ===
- 12 Goncharov (75yard punt return) Tribes - (1st quarter)
  - extra point: 92 Dossche
- Trouillez (45yard run) Black Angels - (1st quarter)
  - extra point: Godichal
- Vermaut to 12 Goncharov (5yard pass) Tribes - (2nd quarter)
  - extra point: 92 Dossche
- Njufom to T. Bouron (25yard pass) Black Angels - (4th quarter)
  - extra point: Godichal
- 28 G. George (4yard run) Tribes - (4th quarter)

Tribes total offensive yards : 199
Black Angels total offensive yards : 185
