= 2010 BFL season =

- Total # of teams: 15
- Regular season: February 14
- Playoffs: May 9 – May 16
- Belgian Bowl: Belgian Bowl XXIII
- Belgian Bowl Date: May 29
- Belgian Bowl Location: Brussels
- Belgian Bowl Champions: West Flanders Tribes
- FFL Champions: West Flanders Tribes
- LFFAB Champions: Brussels Tigers

The 2010 season of the Belgian Football League (BFL) is the regular season played in the Belgium. The first week starts on 14 February 2010 and ends with the 12th week May 2. Then the Playoffs follow in the 13th and 14th week. The 2 remaining teams then compete in the championship Belgian Bowl XXIII. This is played in the 16th week on 29 May 2010

== Regular season ==
=== Regular season overview ===
The FFL schedules two games at one location for saving on transportationcosts for referees and the costs of renting an ambulance and first aid responders. Half of the time, teams are playing virtually at home but actually play at the hosting team's homefield due to these costsaving measures.

FFL
Week	Date	Kickoff	Visitors	Results	Home	Game Site
1	14-02	Bye week due to bad weather: (rescheduled 04-04)				
2	21-02	12.30	West Flanders Tribes	38 – 0	Leuven Lions	Leopoldsburg
2	21-02	15.00	Bornem Titans	36 – 12	Limburg Shotguns	Leopoldsburg
2	21-02	12.30	Brussels Black Angels	20 – 12	Antwerp Diamonds	Ghent
2	21-02	15.00	Brussels Bulls	0 – 19	Ghent Gators	Ghent
3	28-02	15.00	Bornem Titans	(02-05)	West Flanders Tribes	Izegem
3	28-02	12.30	Limburg Shotguns	(02-05)	Brussels Black Angels	Izegem
3	28-02	12.30	Antwerp Diamonds	18 – 2	Brussels Bulls	Korbeek-Lo (LL)
3	28-02	15.00	Ghent Gators	(02-05)	Leuven Lions	Korbeek-Lo (LL)
4	07-03	15.00	Antwerp Diamonds	0 – 28	West Flanders Tribes	Ostend
4	07-03	12.30	Brussels Black Angels	20 – 12	Ghent Gators	Ostend
5	14-03	14.00	Bornem Titans	47 – 0	Antwerp Diamonds	Berendrecht
5	14-03	12.30	Brussels Bulls	35 – 14	Limburg Shotguns	Brussels (BBA)
5	14-03	15.00	Leuven Lions	0 – 23	Brussels Black Angels	Brussels (BBA)
6	21-03	14.00	Brussels Bulls	14 – 26	West Flanders Tribes	Izegem
6	21-03	13.30	Leuven Lions	13 – 0	Antwerp Diamonds	Ghent
6	21-03	16.00	Limburg Shotguns	14 – 20	Ghent Gators	Ghent
7	28-03	15.00	West Flanders Tribes	33 – 7	Brussels Black Angels	Brussels (BBA)
7	28-03	12.30	Bornem Titans	19 – 6	Ghent Gators	Brussels (BBA)
7	28-03	12.30	Antwerp Diamonds	24 – 6	Limburg Shotguns	Heverlee (LL)
7	28-03	15.00	Brussels Bulls	18 – 13	Leuven Lions	Heverlee (LL)
8	04-04	12.30	Limburg Shotguns	6 – 33	West Flanders Tribes	Bornem
8	04-04	15.0	Leuven Lions	0 – 34	Bornem Titans	Bornem
8	04-04	12.30	Antwerp Diamonds	12 – 48	Ghent Gators	Brussels (BB)
8	04-04	15.00	Brussels Black Angels	50 – 0	Brussels Bulls	Brussels (BB)
9	11-04	12.30	West Flanders Tribes	29 – 9	Ghent Gators	Brussels (BBA)
9	11-04	15.00	Bornem Titans	6 – 13	Brussels Black Angels	Brussels (BBA)
9	11-04	14.00	Leuven Lions	14 – 18	Limburg Shotguns	Leopoldsburg
10	18-04	14.00	Leuven Lions	6 – 13	Antwerp Diamonds	Berendrecht
10	18-04	12.30	Limburg Shotguns	6 – 13	Ghent Gators	Brussels (BB)
10	18-04	15.00	Bornem Titans	23 – 8	Brussels Bulls	Brussels (BB)
11	25-04	12.30	Brussels Bulls	18 – 34	West Flanders Tribes	Bornem
11	25-04	15.00	Brussels Black Angels	13 – 3	Bornem Titans	Bornem
12	02-05	15.00	Bornem Titans	23 – 42	West Flanders Tribes	Izegem
12	02-05	12.30	Limburg Shotguns	0 – 33	Brussels Black Angels	Izegem
12	02-05	14.00	Leuven Lions	6 – 6	Ghent Gators	Ghent

- The games in Izegem on week 3 were rescheduled due to a frozen underground of the gamefield.

=== Regular season standings ===
FFL 2010 Standings
	W	L	T	PCT	PF	PA	STK
West Flanders Tribes	8	0	0	1.00	263	77	W8
Brussels Black Angels	7	1	0	.875	179	66	W4
Bornem Titans	5	3	0	.625	192	94	L2
Ghent Gators	4	3	1	.500	127	100	T1
Antwerp Diamonds	3	5	0	.375	79	170	W1
Brussels Bulls	2	6	0	.250	95	197	L3
Leuven Lions	1	6	1	.125	46	144	T1
Limburg Shotguns	1	7	0	.125	76	208	L2

LFFAB 2010 Standings
	W	L	T	PCT	PF	PA	STK
Brussels Tigers	6	0	0	1.00	280	6	W5
Tournai Phoenix	4	1	1	.660	182	24	L1
Dudelange Dragons	3	2	1	.500	141	86	L1
Charleroi Cougars	2	2	2	.330	78	98	L1
Ottignies Fighting Turtles	1	4	1	.160	36	124	L1
Andenne Bears	0	3	3	.000	32	158	L3
Liège Monarchs	0	5	1	.000	28	186	L3
La Louvière Wolves*	-	-	-	-	-	-	-

- (*) La Louvière Wolves did not participate this season.

– clinched seed to the playoffs

== Postseason ==
Belgian Bowl XXIII
West Flanders Tribes (FFL)	Brussels Tigers (LFFAB)
36	6
	1	2	3	4	Total
WFT	15	7	7	7	36
BT	0	0	0	6	6
- Date: May 29
- Stadium: Centre Sportif, Berchem-Sainte-Agathe; Brussels

Quarterfinals; May 9, 2010 @ Tournai/Brussels
2	Tournai Phoenix	20
3	Bornem Titans	13
2	Brussels Black Angels	49
3	Dudelange Dragons	0

Semifinals; May 16, 2010 @ Ostend/Evere
1	West Flanders Tribes	32
2	Tournai Phoenix	0
1	Brussels Tigers	34
2	Brussels Black Angels	7

Belgian Bowl XXIII; May 29, 2010 @ Brussels
1	West Flanders Tribes	36
1	Brussels Tigers	6
