= Belgian Bowl XIII =

Charleroi Cougars (LFFAB)	Izeghem Redskins (FFL)
0	28
- Date: May 28, 2000

The Belgian Bowl XIII was played in 2000 and was won by the Izeghem Redskins.

== Playoffs ==
Quarterfinals; May 7, 2000 @ Brussels
1	Izegem Redskins	20
5	Brussels Tigers	16
3	Liège Red Roosters	50
6	Ghent Gators (FF)	0

Semifinals; May 14, 2000 @ Izeghem
1	Izegem Redskins	34
4	Flemalle Flames	20
2	Charleroi Cougars	14
3	Liège Red Roosters	12

Belgian Bowl XIII; May 28, 2000 @ Izeghem
1	Izegem Redskins	28
2	Charleroi Cougars	0
