= Belgian Bowl XXI =

| West Flanders Tribes (FFL) | Brussels Black Angels (FFL) |
|---|---|
| 25 | 20 |
| | 1 | 2 | 3 | 4 | Total |
|---|---|---|---|---|---|
| WFT | 0 | 19 | 0 | 6 | 25 |
| BBA | 0 | 13 | 0 | 7 | 20 |
- Date: May 31, 2008
- Stadium: Jesse Owens; Anderlecht

Belgian Bowl XXI featured the West Flanders Tribes and the Brussels Black Angels in an American football game to decide the Belgian Football League (BFL) champion for the 2008 season. The Tribes won the Belgian Bowl, completing a perfect season with a record of 8-0. The Belgian Bowl victory was the Tribes 3rd in a row.

== Playoffs ==
The 2 teams that play in the Belgian Bowl are the winners of the Belgian Bowl playoffs.

Quarterfinals; May 11 @ Charleroi/Brussels
2 | Charleroi Cougars | 12
3 | Antwerp Diamonds | 43
2 | Brussels Black Angels | 36
3 | Brussels Tigers | 0

Semifinals; May 18, 2008 @ Ostend/Tournai
1 | West Flanders Tribes | 13
3 | Antwerp Diamonds | 6
1 | Tournai Phoenix | 6
2 | Brussels Black Angels | 17

Belgian Bowl XXI; May 31, 2008 @ Anderlecht
1 | West Flanders Tribes | 25
2 | Brussels Black Angels | 20
