= Belgian Bowl XIV =

Izeghem Redskins (FFL)	Brussels Tigers (LFFAB)
22	0
	1	2	3	4	Total
WFT	0	0	0	22	22
BT	0	0	0	0	0
- Date: June 3, 2001
- Stadium: K.R.C. Gent-Zeehaven; Ghent

The Belgian Bowl XIV was played on June 3, 2001 and was won by the Izeghem Redskins. 700 people attended the final in the stadium of RC Gent.

== Playoffs ==
Wildcard round May 13, 2001 @ Liège
4	Brussels Angels	26
W	Antwerp Diamonds	6
3	Liège Red Roosters	0
W	Brussels Tigers	28

Semifinals; May 20, 2001 @ Waregem
1	Izegem Redskins	42
4	Brussels Angels	14
2	Charleroi Cougars	6
W	Brussels Tigers	20

Belgian Bowl XIV; June 3, 2001 @ Ghent
1	Izegem Redskins	22
W	Brussels Tigers	0
