= Belgian Football League =

Belgian American football league

Belgian American Football League
- Sport: American football
- Founded: 1987
- No. of teams: 8
- Country: Belgium; Luxembourg
- Most recent champion: Mons Knights
- Related competitions: FAFL & LFFAB
- Website: bafl.be

The Belgian American Football League (BAFL) is a sports league for American football in Belgium founded in 1987. The league currently consists of 11 teams from Belgian cities and regions. The league used to be divided into two conferences—the Flemish American Football League (FAFL) and Ligue Francophone de Football Americain de Belgique (LFFAB). The current season is the first without conferences. At the end of the regular season, four teams play in the BFL playoffs, a four-team single-elimination tournament that culminates with the championship game, known as the Belgian Bowl.

== Football rules ==
The BFL uses this field layout, spanning 100 yards from one endzone to the other

The BFL uses the American college football rules: (2013/2014 NCAA Rulebook). These differ from the popular professional league of the United States, the NFL. The officials are organised in the Belgian American Football Officials Committee (BAFOC).

== The conferences ==
The BFL is divided into a Dutch-speaking conference and a French-speaking conference, based on the northern Flemish Community and the southern French Community of Belgium. These two communities intermingle in the territory of Brussels, two teams based in Brussels play in the Dutch (FAFL) and one team plays in the French (LFFAB). The LFFAB has one team from Luxembourg, the Steelers, but they left the league in 2026 for Germany Oberliga. The conferences are important for the championship game as they determine who will participate in the play-offs. Teams only play interconference games in the play-offs.

== Teams ==
There are 18 BFL teams. The La Louvière Wolves are on hold. New teams must be located 20 km from an existing team. This rule does not apply for Brussels. Luxembourg Steelers left in 2026 for Germany Oberliga.

Team	City or area	Founded	Website
Flemish American Football League, FAFL, Flemish Community
Antwerp Spartans	Antwerp, BE	2019	Antwerp Spartans
Bruges Broncos	Brugge, BE	2025	Broncos
Brussels Black Angels	Brussels, BE	1989	Black Angels
Ghent Gators	Ghent, BE	1999	Gators
Izegem Tribes	Izegem, BE	1989	Tribes
Leuven Lions	Leuven, BE	1986	Lions
Limburg Shotguns	Leopoldsburg, BE	2008	Shotguns
Ostend Pirates	Ostend, BE	2013	Pirates
Ligue Francophone de Football Americain de Belgique, LFFAB, French Community
Amay Atomics	Amay, BE	2014	
Andenne Bears	Andenne, BE	2002	Bears
Brussels Tigers	Brussels, BE	1998	Tigers
Charleroi Coal Miners	Charleroi, BE	1993	CoalMiners
Liège Monarchs	Liège, BE	1986	Monarchs
Mons Knights	Mons, BE	2012	Knights
Mont-Saint-Guibert Turtles	Mont-Saint-Guibert, BE	2009	
Verviers Mustangs	Verviers, BE	2016	
Waterloo Warriors	Waterloo, BE	2011	Warriors

=== Team locations ===
Location of the teams in the Belgian Football League

== BFL records ==
- Most national championships:
  - 8 West Flanders Tribes (2000, 2001, 2006–2011)
- Most appearances in a national championship:
  - 16 Brussels Black Angels (1996–1998, 2003, 2005, 2007, 2008, 2011, 2015–2019, 2021, 2025, 2026)
- Most consecutive national championships:
  - 6 West Flanders Tribes (2006–2011)
- Most consecutive appearances in a national championship:
  - 6 West Flanders Tribes (2006–2011)
- Most consecutive appearances in the playoffs:
  - 10 Brussels Black Angels (2001–2011)
- Most consecutive wins:
  - 50 West Flanders Tribes (27 February 2007 – 4 June 2011)
- Longest streak no losses:
  - 53 West Flanders Tribes (21 May 2006 – 4 June 2011)
- Most consecutive perfect seasons:
  - 4 West Flanders Tribes (2008–2011)
- Most consecutive unbeaten seasons:
  - 5 West Flanders Tribes (2007–2011)

== See also ==
- American Football Bond Nederland
