= Overview of Belgian Football League historical results =

The Belgian Football League (BFL) is the amateur sports league for American football in Belgium. The league currently consists of 18 teams from Belgian cities and regions and one team from Luxembourg. The league is divided into two conferences—the Flemish American Football League (FAFL) and Ligue Francophone de Football Americain de Belgique (LFFAB). At the end of each regular season, three teams from each conference play in the BFL playoffs, a six-team single-elimination tournament that culminates with the championship game, known as the Belgian Bowl.

Historical results are summarized below.

== 1987-1994 ==
Championship of Belgium (1987–1994)
Date	Champion
1987	Mouscron Redskins
1988	Brussels Raiders
1989	Brussels Raiders
1990	Brussels Raiders
1991	Brussels Raiders
1992	Leuven Lions
1999	Luxembourg Red Lions
1994	Brussels Raiders

== 1995-1999 ==
Belgian Bowl (from 1995)
Date	Bowl	Champion	result	Runner-up
1995	Belgian Bowl VIII	Tournai Cardinals	34 - 12	Brussels Raiders
1996	Belgian Bowl IX	Tournai Cardinals	13 - 6	Brussels Angels
1997	Belgian Bowl X	Tournai Cardinals	98 - 7	Brussels Angels
1998	Belgian Bowl XI	Tournai Cardinals	16 - 3	Brussels Angels
1999	Belgian Bowl XII	Antwerp Diamonds	41 - 6	Izeghem Redskins

== 2003 ==
BFL 2003 Standings
	W	L	T	PCT	PF	PA	STK
BFL West 2003 Standings
Antwerp Diamonds	4	1	0	.800	118	40	
West Flanders Tribes	2	2	1	.400	74	68	T1
BFL East 2003 Standings
Brussels Black Angels	4	1	0	.800	140	34	
Flemalle Flames	3	2	0	.600	64	45	
Charleroi Cougars	1	3	1	.200	26	86	
Liège Red Roosters	0	5	0	.000	13	164	L5

== 2004 ==
BFL 2004 Standings
	W	L	T	PCT	PF	PA	STK
Antwerp Diamonds	8	0	0	1.00	306	0	W8
Leuven Lions	7	1	0	.875	161	43	
Brussels Black Angels	6	2	0	.750	143	46	
Charleroi Cougars	6	3	0	.667	75	115	
Liège Red Roosters	4	4	1	.444	92	161	
Tournai Phoenix	3	5	0	.375	101	94	
Flemalle Flames	3	5	1	.333	78	152	
West Flanders Tribes	2	5	1	.250	68	70	L1
Brussels Tigers	1	8	0	.111	12	177	
Ghent Gators	0	7	1	.000	32	207	

2004 Playoffs

Semifinals; May 23, 2004 @ Antwerp/Leuven
1	Antwerp Diamonds	20
4	Charleroi Cougars	10
2	Leuven Lions	31
3	Brussels Black Angels	20

Belgian Bowl XVII; June 6, 2004 @ Charleroi
1	Antwerp Diamonds	12
2	Leuven Lions	0

== 2005 ==
- clinched seed to the playoffs

FFL 2005 Standings
	W	L	T	PCT	PF	PA	STK
Antwerp Diamonds	6	0	0	1.00	90	41	W6
Brussels Black Angels	3	2	1	.500	100	58	
West Flanders Tribes	2	3	1	.333	55	71	W1
Leuven Lions	0	6	0	.000	44	119	L6

LFFAB 2005 Standings
	W	L	T	PCT	PF	PA	STK
Tournai Phoenix	3	0	1	.750	85	14	
Liège Red Roosters	3	1	0	.750	68	20	
Charleroi Cougars	2	1	1	.500	74	27	
Brussels Tigers	1	3	0	.250	66	56	
Andenne Bears	0	4	0	.000	0	180	L4

2005 Playoffs

LFFAB-only playoff rounds
Date	Winner	Score	Loser	Game field
April 24	Tournai Phoenix	34 - 0	Liège Red Roosters	Tournai
April 24	Charleroi Cougars	6 - 0	Brussels Tigers	Tournai
May 1	Tournai Phoenix	40 - 0	Charleroi Cougars	Flemalle
May 1	Liège Red Roosters	26 - 20	Brussels Tigers	Flemalle
May 8	Tournai Phoenix	26 - 0	Brussels Tigers	Liège
May 8	Liège Red Roosters	30 - 10	Charleroi Cougars	Liège

Semifinals; May 22, 2005 @ Antwerp/Tournai
1	Antwerp Diamonds	55
2	Liège Red Roosters	0
1	Tournai Phoenix	8
2	Brussels Black Angels	9

Belgian Bowl XVIII; June 5, 2005 @ Tournai
1	Antwerp Diamonds	12
2	Brussels Black Angels	2

== 2006 ==
FFL 2006 Standings
	W	L	T	PCT	PF	PA	STK
West Flanders Tribes	6	1	0	.857	175	75	L1
Brussels Black Angels	6	1	0	.857	199	39	
Antwerp Diamonds	5	2	0	.714			
Leuven Lions	3	4	0	.429	101	115	
Bornem Titans	1	6	0	.143	32	177	
Ghent Gators	0	7	0	.000	56	196	L7

LFFAB 2006 Standings
	W	L	T	PCT	PF	PA	STK
Tournai Phoenix	5	0	0	1.00	188	0	W5
Charleroi Cougars	3	3	0	.500	122	61	
Liège Red Roosters	3	2	0	.600	116	83	
Andenne Bears	0	6	0	.000	0	282	L6

2006 Playoffs

LFFAB-only playoff round May 7, 2006 @ Charleroi
2	Charleroi Cougars	28
3	Liège Monarchs	0
1	Tournai Phoenix	50
4	Andenne Bears	0

Semifinals; May 21, 2006 @ Ostend/Tournai
1	West Flanders Tribes	26
2	Charleroi Cougars	0
1	Tournai Phoenix	14
2	Brussels Black Angels	9

Belgian Bowl XIX; June 4, 2006 @ Brussels
1	West Flanders Tribes	23
1	Tournai Phoenix	14

== 2007 ==
FFL 2007 Standings
	W	L	T	PCT	PF	PA	STK
West Flanders Tribes	6	0	1	.857	198	34	W6
Brussels Black Angels	6	1	0	.857	148	51	
Antwerp Diamonds	4	3	0	.571	74	48	
Leuven Lions	2	3	1	.333			
Bornem Titans	1	6	0	.143	26	176	
Ghent Gators	0	6	0	.000			L6

LFFAB 2007 Standings
	W	L	T	PCT	PF	PA	STK
Tournai Phoenix	6	0	0	1.00	250	0	W6
Charleroi Cougars	5	1	0	.833	165	59	
Brussels Tigers	4	2	0	.667	76	43	
La Louvière Wolves	3	3	0	.500	74	134	
Liège Red Roosters	2	4	0	.333	92	103	
Andenne Bears	1	5	0	.167	47	147	
Flemalle Flames	0	6	0	.000	14	232	L6

2007 Playoffs

LFFAB-only playoff round May 6, 2007 @ Charleroi
2	Charleroi Cougars	6
3	Brussels Tigers	0
1	Tournai Phoenix	50
4	La Louvière Wolves	0

Semifinals; May 20, 2007 @ Ostend/Tournai
1	West Flanders Tribes	55
2	Charleroi Cougars	6
1	Tournai Phoenix	7
2	Brussels Black Angels	9

Belgian Bowl XX; June 2, 2007 @ Brussels
1	West Flanders Tribes	35
2	Brussels Black Angels	13

== 2008 ==
FFL 2008 Standings
	W	L	T	PCT	PF	PA	STK
West Flanders Tribes	8	0	0	1.00	277	59	W8
Brussels Black Angels	6	2	0	.750	271	67	W1
Antwerp Diamonds	5	3	0	.625	101	76	L1
Ghent Gators	5	3	0	.625	146	122	W3
Bornem Titans	3	5	0	.375	39	190	L1
Leuven Lions	1	7	0	.125	66	175	L4
Brussels Bulls	0	8	0	.000	36	247	L8

LFFAB 2008 Standings
	W	L	T	PCT	PF	PA	STK
Tournai Phoenix	8	0	0	1.00	372	12	W8
Charleroi Cougars	6	2	0	.750	288	119	
Brussels Tigers	6	2	0	.750	352	109	
Andenne Bears	5	3	0	.375	92	200	
Liège Red Roosters	3	5	0	.375	81	238	
La Louvière Wolves	2	6	0	.250	59	281	
Flemalle Flames	0	8	0	.000	40	298	L8

2008 Playoffs

Quarterfinals; May 11 @ Charleroi/Brussels
2	Charleroi Cougars	12
3	Antwerp Diamonds	43
2	Brussels Black Angels	36
3	Brussels Tigers	0

Semifinals; May 18, 2008 @ Ostend/Tournai
1	West Flanders Tribes	13
3	Antwerp Diamonds	6
1	Tournai Phoenix	6
2	Brussels Black Angels	17

Belgian Bowl XXI; May 31, 2008 @ Anderlecht
1	West Flanders Tribes	25
2	Brussels Black Angels	20

== 2009 ==
FFL 2009 Standings
	W	L	T	PCT	PF	PA	STK
West Flanders Tribes	8	0	0	1.00	279	37	W8
Brussels Black Angels	7	1	0	.875	207	75	W6
Bornem Titans	4	4	0	.500	141	166	W3
Brussels Bulls	3	5	0	.375	159	194	L3
Leuven Lions	2	5	1	.313	78	168	L4
Antwerp Diamonds	2	6	0	.250	82	191	L2
Ghent Gators	1	6	1	.188	119	230	L1

LFFAB 2009 Standings
	W	L	T	PCT	PF	PA	STK
Tournai Phoenix	7	0	0	1.00	265	8	W7
Charleroi Cougars	5	2	0	.714	160	134	
Brussels Tigers	5	2	0	.714	144	53	
Dudelange Dragons	2	5	0	.286	62	185	
Andenne Bears	2	5	0	.286	51	116	
Liège Monarchs	0	7	0	.000	46	232	L7
La Louvière Wolves*	-	-	-	-	-	-	-

- (*) La Louvière Wolves did not participate this season.

2009 Playoffs

Quarterfinals; May 10 @ Charleroi/Anderlecht
2	Charleroi Cougars	48
3	Bornem Titans	26
2	Brussels Black Angels	50
3	Brussels Tigers	0

Semifinals; May 17, 2009 @ Ostend/Tournai
1	West Flanders Tribes	53
2	Charleroi Cougars	12
1	Tournai Phoenix	20
2	Brussels Black Angels	7

Belgian Bowl XXII; May 31, 2009 @ Brussels
1	West Flanders Tribes	12
1	Tournai Phoenix	0

== 2010 ==
FFL 2010 Standings
	W	L	T	PCT	PF	PA	STK
West Flanders Tribes	8	0	0	1.00	263	77	W8
Brussels Black Angels	7	1	0	.875	179	66	W4
Bornem Titans	5	3	0	.625	192	94	L2
Ghent Gators	4	3	1	.500	127	100	T1
Antwerp Diamonds	3	5	0	.375	79	170	W1
Brussels Bulls	2	6	0	.250	95	197	L3
Leuven Lions	1	6	1	.125	46	144	T1
Limburg Shotguns	1	7	0	.125	76	208	L2

LFFAB 2010 Standings
	W	L	T	PCT	PF	PA	STK
Brussels Tigers	6	0	0	1.00	280	6	W5
Tournai Phoenix	4	1	1	.660	182	24	L1
Dudelange Dragons	3	2	1	.500	141	86	L1
Charleroi Cougars	2	2	2	.330	78	98	L1
Ottignies Fighting Turtles	1	4	1	.160	36	124	L1
Andenne Bears	0	3	3	.000	32	158	L3
Liège Monarchs	0	5	1	.000	28	186	L3
La Louvière Wolves*	-	-	-	-	-	-	-

- (*) La Louvière Wolves did not participate this season.

2010 Playoffs

Quarterfinals; May 9, 2010 @ Tournai/Brussels
2	Tournai Phoenix	20
3	Bornem Titans	13
2	Brussels Black Angels	49
3	Dudelange Dragons	0

Semifinals; May 16, 2010 @ Ostend/Evere
1	West Flanders Tribes	32
2	Tournai Phoenix	0
1	Brussels Tigers	34
2	Brussels Black Angels	7

Belgian Bowl XXIII; May 29, 2010 @ Brussels
1	West Flanders Tribes	36
1	Brussels Tigers	6

== 2011 ==
FFL 2011 Standings
	W	L	T	PCT	PF	PA	STK
West Flanders Tribes	8	0	0	1.00	283	62	W8
Brussels Black Angels	6	1	1	.928	220	26	W5
Brussels Bulls	5	2	1	.688	253	52	W4
Bornem Titans	4	4	0	.500	114	142	L2
Antwerp Diamonds	3	5	0	.375	101	162	L2
Limburg Shotguns	2	6	0	.250	90	286	L4
Ghent Gators	2	6	0	.250	44	239	L1
Leuven Lions	1	7	0	.125	57	193	L7

LFFAB 2011 Standings
	W	L	T	PCT	PF	PA	STK
Brussels Tigers	6	0	0	1.00	257	2	W6
Charleroi Cougars	3	3	0	.500	90	140	
Ottignies Fighting Turtles	3	3	0	.500	155	76	
Liège Monarchs	2	3	1	.333	90	109	
Andenne Bears	0	5	1	.167	16	220	L5
Tournai Phoenix*	-	-	-	-	-	-	-
Dudelange Dragons**	-	-	-	-	-	-	-
La Louvière Wolves**	-	-	-	-	-	-	-

- (*)Tournai phoenix gave forfait for the entire 2011 season. The games Tournai played became null and void, as if they were never played.
- (**) La Louvière Wolves and Dudelange Dragons did not participate this season.

2011 Playoffs

Quarterfinals; May 15 @ Charleroi/Anderlecht
2	Charleroi Cougars	0
3	Brussels Bulls	49
2	Brussels Black Angels	35
3	Ottignies Fighting Turtles	0

Semifinals; May 22, 2011 @ Izegem/Evere
1	West Flanders Tribes	27
3	Brussels Bulls	21
1	Brussels Tigers	10
2	Brussels Black Angels	38

Belgian Bowl XXIV; June 4, 2011 @ Ostend
1	West Flanders Tribes	20
2	Brussels Black Angels	14

== 2012 ==
FFL 2012 Standings
	W	L	T	PCT	PF	PA	STK
Brussels Bulls	5	1	0	.833	117	55	L1
West Flanders Tribes	4	1	1	.667	157	80	W3
Antwerp Diamonds	4	1	1	.667	78	47	W1
Brussels Black Angels	4	2	0	.667	77	37	W3
Ghent Gators	2	4	0	.333	76	114	L2
Leuven Lions	0	5	1	.000	57	95	L4
Puurs Titans	0	5	1	.000	47	183	L3
Limburg Shotguns (*)	-	-	-	-	-	-	-

- (*)Limburg Shotguns gave forfait for the entire 2012 season. The games the Shotguns played became null and void, as if they were never played.

LFFAB 2012 Standings
	W	L	T	PCT	PF	PA	STK
Brussels Tigers	8	0	0	1.00	310	20	W8
Corbais Fighting Turtles	6	2	0	.750	206	93	
Liège Monarchs	4	4	0	.500	146	152	
Charleroi Cougars	4	4	0	.500	160	170	
Andenne Bears	3	5	0	.375	142	200	
Tournai Phoenix	1	6	1	.125	138	235	
Luxembourg Steelers	1	6	1	.125	54	247	

2012 Playoffs

Quarterfinals; May 20, 2012 @ Ottignies, Ostend
2	Corbais Fighting Turtles	13
3	Antwerp Diamonds	22
2	West Flanders Tribes	42
3	Liège Monarchs	0

Semifinals; May 27, 2012 @ Molenbeek, Evere
1	Brussels Bulls	9
3	Antwerp Diamonds	12
1	Brussels Tigers	34
2	West Flanders Tribes	7

Belgian Bowl XXV; June 9, 2012 @ Ostend
3	Antwerp Diamonds	6
1	Brussels Tigers	46

== 2013 ==
FFL 2013 Standings
	W	L	T	PCT	PF	PA	STK
Brussels Bulls	6	0	0	1.00	178	14	W6
Brussels Black Angels	5	1	0	.833	127	29	W3
Puurs Titans	3	2	0	.600	81	54	W1
Leuven Lions	2	3	1	.417	56	96	L2
Antwerp Diamonds	1	3	1	.300	49	105	T1
Ghent Gators	1	4	1	.250	46	126	L2
Izegem Tribes	0	5	1	.083	49	162	T1

LFFAB 2013 Standings
Group A 2013 Standings
	W	L	T	PCT	PF	PA
Brussels Tigers	7	0	0	1.000	301	26
Liège Monarchs	4	3	0	0.571	160	112
Andenne Bears						
Luxembourg Steelers						
Group B 2013 Standings
	W	L	T	PCT	PF	PA
Louvain Fighting Turtles	6	1	0	0.857	255	46
Tournai Phoenix						
Waterloo Warriors						
Charleroi Cougars						

2013 Playoffs

Quarterfinals; May 12, 2013 @ TBD
2	Corbais Fighting Turtles	24
3	Puurs Titans	2
2	Brussels Black Angels
3	Liege Monarchs

Semifinals; May 19, 2013 @ TBD
1	Brussels Bulls	50
2	Corbais Fighting Turtles	14
1	Brussels Tigers	37
2	Brussels Black Angels	7

Belgian Bowl XXVI; June 2, 2013 @ Izegem
1	Brussels Bulls	0
1	Brussels Tigers	9

== 2014 ==
FAFL 2014 Standings
	W	L	T	PCT	PF	PA	STK
Ghent Gators	7	1	0	.875	288	65	W2
Brussels Black Angels	7	1	0	.875	226	66	W7
Ostend Pirates	6	2	0	.750	196	84	W4
Brussels Bulls	5	3	0	.625	158	73	W2
Leuven Lions	4	4	0	.500	148	138	W1
Puurs Titans	3	5	0	.375	84	219	L3
Limburg Shotguns	2	5	1	.313	80	208	L2
Izegem Tribes	1	6	1	.188	90	203	L3
Antwerp Diamonds	0	8	0	.000	51	265	L8

LFFAB 2014 Standings
	W	L	T	PCT	PF	PA	STK
Brussels Tigers	5	0	0	1.00	212	26	W5
Grez-Doiceau Fighting Turtles	4	1	0	.800	159	68	W2
Liège Monarchs	3	2	0	.600	152	87	W1
Waterloo Warriors	2	3	0	.400	132	116	L3
Charleroi Coal Miners	1	4	0	.200	42	196	W1
Tournai Phoenix	0	4	0	.000	19	247	L4
Andenne Bears	-	-	-	-	-	-	-
Luxembourg Steelers	-	-	-	-	-	-	-

2014 Playoffs

Quarterfinals; June 8, 2014 @Grez-Doiceau @Anderlecht
2	Grez-Doiceau Fighting Turtles	22
3	Ostend Pirates	30
2	Brussels Black Angels	52
3	Liège Monarchs	12

Semifinals; June 15, 2014 @Gent @Evere
1	Ghent Gators	16
3	Ostend Pirates	14
1	Brussels Tigers	7
2	Brussels Black Angels	3

Belgian Bowl XXVII; June 29, 2014 @ Izegem
1	Ghent Gators	38
1	Brussels Tigers	0

== 2015 ==
FAFL 2015 Standings
	W	L	T	PCT	PF	PA	STK
Brussels Black Angels	7	0	0	1.00	295		W7
Ghent Gators	6	1	0	0.857	216		L1
Ostend Pirates	5	2	0	.714	187		
Izegem Tribes	4	3	0	.571	114		
Antwerp Diamonds	2	5	0	.286	68		
Leuven Lions	2	5	0	.167	84		W
Limburg Shotguns	1	6	0	.143	85		L
Puurs Titans	1	6	0	.143	71		

LFFAB 2015 Standings
	W	L	T	PCT	PF	PA	STK
Group D1
Brussels Tigers	5	1	0				
Liège Monarchs	4	1	1				
Waterloo Warriors	1	0	5				
Louvain-la-Neuve Fighting Turtles	1	0	5				
Group D2
Andenne Bears	4	0	0	1.00			
Tournai Phoenix	3	0	1				
Charleroi Coal Miners	2	0	2				
Ardenne-Gaume-Lorraine Razorback	1	0	3				
Braine-le-Comte Sharks	0	0	4	0.00			L4

2015 Playoffs

Quarterfinals; June 7th, 2015
2	Liège Monarchs	12
3	Ostend Pirates	22
2	Ghent Gators	22
3	Waterloo Warriors	24

Semifinals; June 14th, 2015
1	Brussels Black Angels	14
3	Ostend Pirates	6
1	Brussels Tigers	56
3	Waterloo Warriors	14

Belgian Bowl XXVIII; June 27th, 2015 @ Sint-Niklaas
1	Brussels Tigers	8
1	Brussels Black Angels	13

== Statistics ==
=== BFL standings since 2000 ===
BFL 2000-2011 standings
Team	#G	W	L	T	PCT	PF	PA	SP
Andenne Bears	42	8	30	4	.190	236	1273	-1037
Antwerp Diamonds	73	48	25	0	.658			
Puurs Titans	46	18	28	0	.391	544	945	-401
Brussels Black Angels	77	55	19	3	.714	1779	649	1130
Brussels Bulls	32	10	21	1	.313	543	690	-147
Brussels Tigers	62	37	25	0	.597	1421	666	755
Charleroi Cougars	78	44	30	4	.564	1414	1118	296
Dudelange Dragons	12	5	6	1	.417	203	271	-68
Flemalle Flames †	44	13	30	1	.295	450	1075	-625
Ghent Gators	67	12	53	2	.179			
La Louvière Wolves	14	5	9	0	.357	133	415	-282
Leuven Lions	58	17	39	2	.293			
Liège Monarchs	76	22	51	3	.289	803	1764	-961
Limburg Shotguns	16	3	13	0	.186	166	494	-328
Ottignies Fighting Turtles	16	5	9	1	.367	247	306	-59
Tournai Phoenix	51	42	7	2	.824	1627	212	1415
West Flanders Tribes	86	66	15	5	.767	2096	739	1357

- † indicates a defunct team
- Statistics for the 2001 division II not included
- Teams in yellow currently play in the FFL, in red in the LFFAB.
