= Belgian Bowl XV =

Brussels Tigers (LFFAB)	Antwerp Diamonds (FFL)
24	14
- Date: June 2, 2002

The Belgian Bowl XV was played in 2002 and was won by the Brussels Tigers. This was the last time a team of the LFFAB won the Belgian Bowl.

== Playoffs ==
Semifinals; May 19, 2002 @ Antwerp
1	Antwerp Diamonds	30
2	Brussels Angels	8
1	Brussels Tigers	8
3	West Flanders Tribes	6

Belgian Bowl XV; June 2, 2002 @ Ingelmunster
1	Antwerp Diamonds	14
1	Brussels Tigers	24
