= Belgian Bowl X =

Belgian Bowl XI
Brussels Black Angels (FFL)	Tournai Cardinals (LFFAB)
7	98
	1	2	3	4	Total
BBA	28	28	28	14	98
TC	0	0	0	7	7

The Belgian Bowl X was played in 1997 and was won by the Tournai Cardinals.
