= 2002 BFL season =

- Total # of teams: 9
- Regular season: March 3
- Playoffs: May 19
- Belgian Bowl: Belgian Bowl XV
- Belgian Bowl Date: June 2
- Belgian Bowl Location: Ingelmunster
- Belgian Bowl Champions: Brussels Tigers

The 2002 season of the Belgian Football League (BFL) is the regular season played in the Belgium. The Brussels Tigers won Belgian Bowl XV against the Antwerp Diamonds by a score of 18-16. This was the last time a team of the LFFAB won the Belgian Bowl.

== Regular season ==
=== Regular season standings ===
W = Wins, L = Losses, T = Ties, PCT = Winning Percentage, PF= Points For, PA = Points Against

BFL 2002 Standings
	W	L	T	PCT	PF	PA	STK
BFL West 2002 Standings
Antwerp Diamonds	8	0	0	1.00	286	24	W8
Tournai Phoenix	6	2	0	.750	184	78	
West Flanders Tribes	4	3	1	.500	146	90	W1
Ghent Gators	0	8	0	.000	6	299	L8
BFL East 2002 Standings
Brussels Tigers	6	2	0	.750	158	66	
Brussels Angels	4	3	1	.500	160	97	
Flemalle Flames	4	4	0	.500	202	162	
Charleroi Cougars	2	6	0	.250	124	194	
Liège Red Roosters	1	7	0	.125	40	302	

- clinched seed to the post season

== Postseason ==
Belgian Bowl XV
Brussels Tigers (LFFAB)	Antwerp Diamonds (FFL)
24	14
- Date: 2002

Semifinals; May 19, 2002 @ Antwerp
1	Antwerp Diamonds	30
2	Brussels Angels	8
1	Brussels Tigers	8
3	West Flanders Tribes	6

Belgian Bowl XV; June 2, 2002 @ Ingelmunster
1	Antwerp Diamonds	14
1	Brussels Tigers	24
