= 2015 BFL season =

- Total # of teams: 17
- Playoffs: June 7, 2015
- Belgian Bowl: Belgian Bowl XXVIII
- Belgian Bowl Date: June 27, 2015
- Belgian Bowl Location: Sint-Niklaas, Belgium
- Belgian Bowl Champions: Brussels Black Angels
- FFL Champions: Brussels Black Angels
- LFFAB Champions: Brussels Tigers

The 2015 season of the Belgian Football League (BFL) was the 29th edition of the Belgian championship in American Football Championship. The championship game was the Belgian Bowl XXVIII won by the Brussels Black Angels.

== Regular season ==
=== Regular season standings ===
FAFL 2015 Standings
	W	L	T	PCT	PF	PA	STK
Brussels Black Angels	7	0	0	1.00	295		W7
Ghent Gators	6	1	0	0.857	216		L1
Ostend Pirates	5	2	0	.714	187		
Izegem Tribes	4	3	0	.571	114		
Antwerp Diamonds	2	5	0	.286	68		
Leuven Lions	2	5	0	.167	84		W
Limburg Shotguns	1	6	0	.143	85		L
Puurs Titans	1	6	0	.143	71		

LFFAB 2015 Standings
	W	L	T	PCT	PF	PA	STK
Group D1
Brussels Tigers	5	1	0				
Liège Monarchs	4	1	1				
Waterloo Warriors	1	0	5				
Louvain-la-Neuve Fighting Turtles	1	0	5				
Group D2
Andenne Bears	4	0	0	1.00			
Tournai Phoenix	3	0	1				
Charleroi Coal Miners	2	0	2				
Ardenne-Gaume-Lorraine Razorback	1	0	3				
Braine-le-Comte Sharks	0	0	4	0.00			L4

– clinched seed to the playoffs

== Postseason ==
Belgian Bowl XXVIII
Brussels Black Angels	Brussels Tigers
13	8
- Stadium: Puyenbeke stadium Sint-Niklaas

The Belgian Bowl XXVIII was held on June 29, 2015, in Sint-Niklaas. The Brussels Black Angels won over the Brussels Tigers.

Quarterfinals; June 7th, 2015
2	Liège Monarchs	12
3	Ostend Pirates	22
2	Ghent Gators	22
3	Waterloo Warriors	24

Semifinals; June 14th, 2015
1	Brussels Black Angels	14
3	Ostend Pirates	6
1	Brussels Tigers	56
3	Waterloo Warriors	14

Belgian Bowl XXVIII; June 27th, 2015 @ Sint-Niklaas
1	Brussels Tigers	8
1	Brussels Black Angels	13
