= Belgian Bowl XI =

Tournai Cardinals (LFFAB)	Brussels Black Angels (FFL)
16	3
	1	2	3	4	Total
TC	8	0	8	0	16
BBA	0	0	0	3	3

The Belgian Bowl XI was played in 1998 and was won by the Tournai Cardinals.
