= Belgian Bowl IX =

Tournai Cardinals (LFFAB)	Brussels Black Angels (FFL)
13	6
	1	2	3	4	Total
TC	6	0	0	7	13
BBA	0	0	6	0	6

The Belgian Bowl IX was played in 1996 and was won by the Tournai Cardinals.
