= 2003 BFL season =

- Total # of teams: 6
- Regular season: March 2
- Belgian Bowl: Belgian Bowl XVI
- Belgian Bowl Date: June 6
- Belgian Bowl Champions: Brussels Black Angels

The 2003 season of the Belgian Football League (BFL) is the regular season played in the Belgium. In the Belgian Bowl XVI, the Antwerp Diamonds were disqualified giving the title to the Brussels Black Angels.

== Regular season ==
=== Regular season overview ===
The FFL schedules two games at one location for saving on transportationcosts for referees and the costs of renting an ambulance and first aid responders. Half of the time, teams are playing virtually at home but actually play at the hosting team's homefield due to these costsaving measures.

FFL
Week	Date	Visitors	Results	Home	Game Site
1	March 2				
2	March 9	West Flanders Tribes	6 - 22	Antwerp Diamonds	Antwerp
3	March 16				
4	March 23	West Flanders Tribes	6 - 26	Flemalle Flames	Charleroi
5	March 30	Brussels Black Angels	14 - 20	West Flanders Tribes	Izeghem
6	April 6	West Flanders Tribes	36 - 0	Liège Red Roosters	Liège
7	April 13				
8	April 20	Easter Bye			
9	April 27	West Flanders Tribes	6 - 6	Charleroi Cougars	Charleroi
10	May 4				

=== Regular season standings ===
BFL 2003 Standings
	W	L	T	PCT	PF	PA	STK
BFL West 2003 Standings
Antwerp Diamonds	4	1	0	.800	118	40	
West Flanders Tribes	2	2	1	.400	74	68	T1
BFL East 2003 Standings
Brussels Black Angels	4	1	0	.800	140	34	
Flemalle Flames	3	2	0	.600	64	45	
Charleroi Cougars	1	3	1	.200	26	86	
Liège Red Roosters	0	5	0	.000	13	164	L5

== Postseason ==
Belgian Bowl XVI
Antwerp Diamonds (FFL)	Brussels Black Angels (FFL)
0	50
	1	2	3	4	Total
AD	-	-	-	-	0
BBA	-	-	-	-	0
- Date: 2003
