= Belgian Bowl XVI =

Antwerp Diamonds (FFL)	Brussels Black Angels (FFL)
0	50
	1	2	3	4	Total
AD	-	-	-	-	0
BBA	-	-	-	-	0
- Date: N/A, 2003
- Stadium: N/A; N/A

In the Belgian Bowl XVI, the Antwerp Diamonds were disqualified giving the title to the Brussels Black Angels.

== 2003 standings ==
BFL 2003 Standings
	W	L	T	PCT	PF	PA	STK
BFL West 2003 Standings
Antwerp Diamonds	4	1	0	.800	118	40	
West Flanders Tribes	2	2	1	.400	74	68	T1
BFL East 2003 Standings
Brussels Black Angels	4	1	0	.800	140	34	
Flemalle Flames	3	2	0	.600	64	45	
Charleroi Cougars	1	3	1	.200	26	86	
Liège Red Roosters	0	5	0	.000	13	164	L5
