= 2007 BFL season =

- Total # of teams: 13
- Regular season: February 18
- Playoffs: May 6 – May 20
- Belgian Bowl: Belgian Bowl XX
- Belgian Bowl Date: June 2
- Belgian Bowl Location: Brussels
- Belgian Bowl Champions: West Flanders Tribes
- FFL Champions: West Flanders Tribes
- LFFAB Champions: Tournai Phoenix

The 2007 season of the Belgian Football League (BFL) is the regular season played in the Belgium. The West Flanders Tribes won Belgian Bowl XX against the Brussels Black Angels by a score of 35-13. It was the second of six consecutive Belgian Bowl victories for the Tribes.

== Regular season ==
=== Regular season standings ===
FFL 2007 Standings
	W	L	T	PCT	PF	PA	STK
West Flanders Tribes	6	0	1	.857	198	34	W6
Brussels Black Angels	6	1	0	.857	148	51	
Antwerp Diamonds	4	3	0	.571	74	48	
Leuven Lions	2	3	1	.333			
Bornem Titans	1	6	0	.143	26	176	
Ghent Gators	0	6	0	.000			L6

LFFAB 2007 Standings
	W	L	T	PCT	PF	PA	STK
Tournai Phoenix	6	0	0	1.00	250	0	W6
Charleroi Cougars	5	1	0	.833	165	59	
Brussels Tigers	4	2	0	.667	76	43	
La Louvière Wolves	3	3	0	.500	74	134	
Liège Red Roosters	2	4	0	.333	92	103	
Andenne Bears	1	5	0	.167	47	147	
Flemalle Flames	0	6	0	.000	14	232	L6

- clinched seed to the playoffs

== Postseason ==
Belgian Bowl XX
West Flanders Tribes (FFL)	Brussels Black Angels (FFL)
35	13
	1	2	3	4	Total
WFT	8	7	7	13	35
BBA	0	7	0	6	13
- Date: June 2, 2007
- Stadium: Berchem-Sainte-Agathe Stadium; Brussels

LFFAB-only playoff round May 6, 2007 @ Charleroi
2	Charleroi Cougars	6
3	Brussels Tigers	0
1	Tournai Phoenix	50
4	La Louvière Wolves	0

Semifinals; May 20, 2007 @ Ostend/Tournai
1	West Flanders Tribes	55
2	Charleroi Cougars	6
1	Tournai Phoenix	7
2	Brussels Black Angels	9

Belgian Bowl XX; June 2, 2007 @ Brussels
1	West Flanders Tribes	35
2	Brussels Black Angels	13
