= Belgian Bowl VIII =

Brussels Raiders (LFFAB)	Tournai Cardinals (LFFAB)
12	34
	1	2	3	4	Total
BR	6	6	0	0	12
TC	7	7	14	6	34
- Stadium: Annexe Heysel; Brussels

The Belgian Bowl VIII was played in 1995 and was won by the Tournai Cardinals. Although it was the first Belgian Bowl, it was numbered 8 because it was the 8th official BFL Season.
