= 2009 BFL season =

- Total # of teams: 13
- Regular season: February 15
- Playoffs: May 10 – May 17
- Belgian Bowl: Belgian Bowl XXII
- Belgian Bowl Date: May 31
- Belgian Bowl Location: Brussels
- Belgian Bowl Champions: West Flanders Tribes
- FFL Champions: West Flanders Tribes
- LFFAB Champions: Tournai Phoenix

The 2009 season of the Belgian Football League (BFL) is the regular season played in the Belgium. The first week starts on February 8 and ends with the 12th week April 26. Then the Playoffs follow in the 14th and 15th week. The 2 remaining teams then compete in the championship Belgian Bowl XXII.This is played in the 17th week on May 30, 2009.

== Regular season ==
=== Regular season standings ===
FFL 2009 Standings
	W	L	T	PCT	PF	PA	STK
West Flanders Tribes	8	0	0	1.00	279	37	W8
Brussels Black Angels	7	1	0	.875	207	75	W6
Bornem Titans	4	4	0	.500	141	166	W3
Brussels Bulls	3	5	0	.375	159	194	L3
Leuven Lions	2	5	1	.313	78	168	L4
Antwerp Diamonds	2	6	0	.250	82	191	L2
Ghent Gators	1	6	1	.188	119	230	L1

LFFAB 2009 Standings
	W	L	T	PCT	PF	PA	STK
Tournai Phoenix	7	0	0	1.00	265	8	W7
Charleroi Cougars	5	2	0	.714	160	134	
Brussels Tigers	5	2	0	.714	144	53	
Dudelange Dragons	2	5	0	.286	62	185	
Andenne Bears	2	5	0	.286	51	116	
Liège Monarchs	0	7	0	.000	46	232	L7
La Louvière Wolves*	-	-	-	-	-	-	-

- (*) La Louvière Wolves did not participate this season.

– clinched seed to the playoffs

== Postseason ==
Belgian Bowl XXII
Tournai Phoenix (LFFAB)	West Flanders Tribes (FFL)
0	12
	1	2	3	4	Total
TP	0	0	0	0	0
WFT	0	0	6	6	12
- Date: May 31, 2009
- Stadium: I.S.B. Brussels

In the 2009 playoffs the Tigers played in the quarter-final against the Brussels Black Angels on May 10. The Tigers gave forfait after the halftime resulting in a 50–0 defeat.

Quarterfinals; May 10 @ Charleroi/Anderlecht
2	Charleroi Cougars	48
3	Bornem Titans	26
2	Brussels Black Angels	50
3	Brussels Tigers	0

Semifinals; May 17, 2009 @ Ostend/Tournai
1	West Flanders Tribes	53
2	Charleroi Cougars	12
1	Tournai Phoenix	20
2	Brussels Black Angels	7

Belgian Bowl XXII; May 31, 2009 @ Brussels
1	West Flanders Tribes	12
1	Tournai Phoenix	0
