= Belgian Bowl XVII =

Leuven Lions (FFL)	Antwerp Diamonds (FFL)
0	12
	1	2	3	4	Total
LL	0	0	0	0	0
AD	0	0	6	6	12
- Date: June 6, 2004

The Belgian Bowl XVII was played in 2004 and was won by the Antwerp Diamonds. This was the second consecutive appearance of Antwerp in the Belgian Bowl.

== Playoffs ==
The top four teams of the regular season are seeded into playoffs for the Belgian Bowl

Semifinals; May 23, 2004 @ Antwerp/Leuven
1	Antwerp Diamonds	20
4	Charleroi Cougars	10
2	Leuven Lions	31
3	Brussels Black Angels	20

Belgian Bowl XVII; June 6, 2004 @ Charleroi
1	Antwerp Diamonds	12
2	Leuven Lions	0
