= Mons Knights =

American football team based in Belgium

General information
- Founded: 2012
- Stadium: FC Havre
- Headquartered: Mons, Hainaut, Belgium
- Colors: Black , Gold, White,
- Website: www.knights-mons.com

Personnel
- Head coach: Andy Brutyn
- President: Franky Thrasher

League / conference affiliations
- Belgian Football League (BAFL); LFFA

Championships
- League championships: 0; 2024

Current uniform
Home

Away

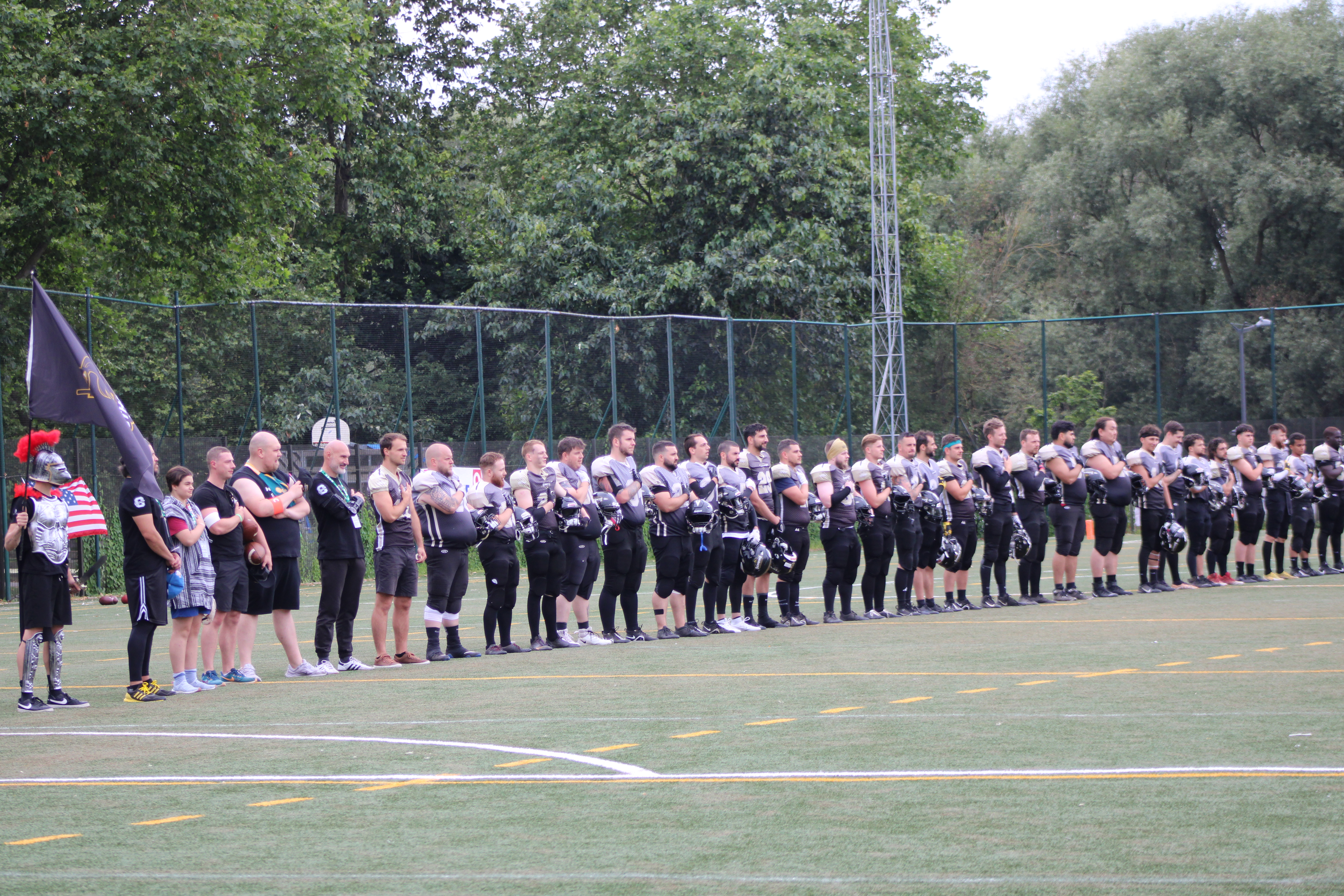

The Mons Knights are an American gridiron football team based in Mons, Belgium. Established in 2012, the team has become a significant presence in the Belgian American football scene, competing in various national leagues and tournaments. They are a member of Ligue Francophone de Football Americain de Belgique.

== History ==
The Mons Knights are an American football team based in Mons, Belgium. The team and organization was created in 2012, under the name "Sharks", in Braine-le-Comte, Belgium. In 2015, and after an undefeated championship season in Division 3, the organization decided to relocate itself and move to Mons. This was a strategic and beneficial choice since Mons is one of the biggest cities in Belgium. With this move we had the opportunity to recruit more players and have more visibility. After the move, the organization changed of name from "BLC Sharks" to "Knights Mons". The new name of the organization is a tribute to Saint-Georges, hero of the city of Mons and one of the main characters of the folklore and history of the city. The spear, that you can find in the club logo, is also a main part of the culture since the Dragon was slain by Saint-Georges with the spear. Currently the Knights Mons play in the National League (Division 1) of the Belgium American Football League (BAFL). The team is growing as desired since the Knights Mons won the Division 3 Championship in the 2017-2018 season and finished at a deserved third place in Division 2 during the 2018-2019 season. This season the Knights will try to maintain their level and hope to finish the 2019-2020 season with a better standing than the previous one.

=== Team development ===
- Early Years 2012-2015: The initial years saw the Mons Knights focusing on recruitment and training, participating in friendly matches and local tournaments to gain experience.
- 2017-2020: With the arrival of new American coaches, Nick Granado ,Justin Cox and Pat Lockhart the team embarked on a new phase of strategic game planning. This shift resulted in a remarkable turnaround, as the team went from a winless season in Division 3 to undefeated seasons and promotion to Division 2 and finishing in the top 3 of division 2. This year also marked the team's first ventures into youth development, with the establishment of U19 and U16 teams through a collaboration with the Charleroi Coal Miners.
- 2020-2022 The post COVID rebuild: Like many sports across the world, American football was highly impacted by the COVID-19. The Mons Knights had to rebuild a complete new team from a depleted base of 11 players . This was done under the leadership of new head coach James Wellington. Coach Wellington brought in former NCAA Div 1 players DA Aquino and Jason Neago to help develop and coach. this endeavor led to the Mons Knights' first title in the U20 Categorize in 2023.
- 2022-2024: As of 2022 defensive coordinator DA Aquino took on the head coach position with the clear mandate from the club president to build a successful program development, based on Coach Aquino's NCAA experience at the UCLA Bruins. He brought on James Mathews as defensive coordinator
- League Participation: By 2013, the Knights had joined the Belgian American Football League (BAFL), where they began competing more formally. They brought more strategic approach as of 2017

=== Notable players ===
- Fabrice Zoppe : Starting Quarterback of the 2024 Season he led the Knights to the Belgian Bowl Victory and with a 102 points scored in the regular season he was the leading scorer in the BAFL for 2024
- Mael Ikolo:Young defensive lineman who was one of the youngest players allowed to play in the Senior division having played his first game at age 15. He is currently a member of the Junior Belgian National Team

=== Coaching staff ===
- Head Coach: Andy Brutyn has been the head coach of the Mons Knights since 2024, bringing extensive experience and a strategic approach to the team.
- Assistant Coaches: The coaching staff includes DA Aquino as technical advisor , Fabrice Zoppe as Quarterback coach, Olivier Pierrot as Defensive coordinator Fred Meysman as Line coach, contributing to different aspects of the team's performance.

== Season-by-season performance ==
A detailed breakdown of the Mons Knights' performance over the seasons can be found below:

- 2018: BAFL Div III Champions
- 2019: BAFL Div II Third Place
- 2023: LFFA U20 Champions
- 2023: BAFL Vice Champions
- 2024: BAFL U17 Champions
- 2024: Belgian Bowl Champions

Date	Type	Country	Home	Visitors	Score
30 Jun 24	Final	Belgium	Mons Knights	Waterloo Warriors	33-30
16 Jun 24	Semi-final	Belgium	Mons Knights	Ghent Gators	30-28
02 Jun 24	Regular	Belgium	Mons Knights	Waterloo Warriors	10-0
19 May 24	Regular	Belgium	Mons Knights	Ostend Pirates	8-16
5 May 24	Regular	Belgium	Mons Knights	Bruges Broncos	39-0
21 Apr 24	Regular	Belgium	Liège Monarchs	Mons Knights	3-6
14 Apr 24	Regular	Belgium	Mons Knights	Ghent Gators	21-20
24 Mar 24	Regular	Belgium	Verviers Mustangs	Mons Knights	0-9
17 Mar 24	Regular	Belgium	Fighting Turtles	Mons Knights	45-14
03 Mar 24	Regular	Belgium	Mons Knights	Amay Atomics	28-0

=== 2024 senior roster ===
Mons Knights 2024 Roster
Quarterbacks: 9 (Belgium) Fabrice Zoppe (C); Wide receivers: 6 (Belgium) Maximilien Decarpentry; 16 (Belgium) Joseph Cressatti; 5 (Belgium) Diego Benoit Carlos Domingos Valentim; 31 (Belgium) A P; 17 (Belgium) Félix Frutos Zavala; 11 (Belgium) Isaï Rateni; 10 (Belgium) Vivian Dufrasnes; Running backs: 22 (Belgium) Loic Fena; 27 (Belgium) Grégory Harmegnies; 26 (France) Tom Messager; 46 (Italy) Tobias Pelliconi; 91 (Belgium) Clément Willems; Offensive linemen: 55 (Belgium) Bat-Orgil Batsukh; 64 (Belgium) Martin Larive; 62 (Belgium) Gillian Lombart; 56 (Belgium) Frederic Meysman (C); 54 (Belgium) Mehdi Saad	Defensive linemen: 99 (Belgium) Maël Ikolo; 50 (Belgium) Badara Khan; 78 (France) Mukendi Muanda; 54 (Belgium) Mehdi Saad (A); 70 (Belgium) Bastien Tagliatti; Linebackers: 41 (Belgium) Quentin Beauchampet (C); 7 (Belgium) Noan Musialik; 34 (Belgium) Damien Lerat; Defensive backs: 48 (Belgium) Tristan Thrasher (C); 15 (Belgium) Tao Thrasher; 21 (Belgium) Arnaud Cambier; 32 (Italy) Matteo Faini; 28 (Belgium) Quentin Renaut; 13 (Belgium) Theo Schreve; 29 (Belgium) Guillaume Serroyen; 33 (Belgium) Niels Vanvinckenroye; 22 (Belgium) Olivier Pierrot	Coaching staff: Head coach DA Aquino; Defensive Coordinator James Mathews; Offensive Coordinator DA Aquino; Assistant Offensive Coordinator Jason Neago; Running Backs coach; Jason Neago; Line coach Frederic Meysman; DB coach; Olivier Pierrot

In 2023 The Mons Knights developed a partnership with NFL Veteran George Teague which led to the development of the Teague's Take Camp. This is non profit football camp that aims at developing European Football players with an NFL veteran player.
