= Flemish American Football League =

- Current season, competition or edition: 2018 BFL season
- Sport: American football
- Founded: 2003
- President: Roald Piqueur
- No. of teams: 8
- Country: Belgium
- Most recent champion: Brussels Black Angels
- Most titles: 6 West-Vlaanderen Tribes
- Website: www.fafl.be

The Flemish American Football League (FAFL) is one of the two conferences of the Belgian Football League (BFL). It consists of teams from the Flemish Community, whereas the Ligue Francophone de Football Americain de Belgique (LFFAB) consists of teams from the French Community. The top three teams from the Flemish League qualify for the BFL playoffs at the conclusion of the regular season. The playoffs determine which teams play in the Belgian Bowl.

== Teams ==
There are 9 FAFL teams.

Team	City/Area	Founded	Head coach	Website
Flemish American Football League, FAFL, Flemish Community
Antwerp Diamonds	Antwerp, BE	1989	John Jolie	Diamonds
Brussels Black Angels	Brussels, BE	1989	Romuald Derys	Black Angels
Brussels Bulls	Brussels, BE	2005	Curtis Plybon	Bulls
Ghent Gators	Ghent, BE	1999	Roald Piqueur	Gators
Izegem Tribes	Izegem, BE	1989		Tribes
Leuven Lions	Leuven, BE	1986	Kevin Marcoen	Lions
Limburg Shotguns	Leopoldsburg, BE	2008	none	Shotguns
Ostend Pirates	Ostend, BE	2013		Pirates
Puurs Titans	Puurs, BE	2004	Dorian Vermeir / Olivier Van Moorleghem	Titans

== Season's History ==
W = Wins, L = Losses, T = Ties, PCT = Winning Percentage, PF= Points For, PA = Points Against
- clinched seed to the playoffs

=== 2005 season ===
FFL 2005 Standings
	W	L	T	PCT	PF	PA	STK
Antwerp Diamonds	6	0	0	1.00	90	41	W6
Brussels Black Angels	3	2	1	.500	100	58	
West Flanders Tribes	2	3	1	.333	55	71	W1
Leuven Lions	0	6	0	.000	44	119	L6

2005 Playoffs

LFFAB-only playoff rounds
Date	Winner	Score	Loser	Game field
April 24	Tournai Phoenix	34 - 0	Liège Red Roosters	Tournai
April 24	Charleroi Cougars	6 - 0	Brussels Tigers	Tournai
May 1	Tournai Phoenix	40 - 0	Charleroi Cougars	Flemalle
May 1	Liège Red Roosters	26 - 20	Brussels Tigers	Flemalle
May 8	Tournai Phoenix	26 - 0	Brussels Tigers	Liège
May 8	Liège Red Roosters	30 - 10	Charleroi Cougars	Liège

Semifinals; May 22, 2005 @ Antwerp/Tournai
1	Antwerp Diamonds	55
2	Liège Red Roosters	0
1	Tournai Phoenix	8
2	Brussels Black Angels	9

Belgian Bowl XVIII; June 5, 2005 @ Tournai
1	Antwerp Diamonds	12
2	Brussels Black Angels	2

=== 2006 season ===
FFL 2006 Standings
	W	L	T	PCT	PF	PA	STK
West Flanders Tribes	6	1	0	.857	175	75	L1
Brussels Black Angels	6	1	0	.857	199	39	
Antwerp Diamonds	5	2	0	.714			
Leuven Lions	3	4	0	.429	101	115	
Bornem Titans	1	6	0	.143	32	177	
Ghent Gators	0	7	0	.000	56	196	L7

2006 Playoffs

LFFAB-only playoff round May 7, 2006 @ Charleroi
2	Charleroi Cougars	28
3	Liège Monarchs	0
1	Tournai Phoenix	50
4	Andenne Bears	0

Semifinals; May 21, 2006 @ Ostend/Tournai
1	West Flanders Tribes	26
2	Charleroi Cougars	0
1	Tournai Phoenix	14
2	Brussels Black Angels	9

Belgian Bowl XIX; June 4, 2006 @ Brussels
1	West Flanders Tribes	23
1	Tournai Phoenix	14

=== 2007 season ===
FFL 2007 Standings
	W	L	T	PCT	PF	PA	STK
West Flanders Tribes	6	0	1	.857	198	34	W6
Brussels Black Angels	6	1	0	.857	148	51	
Antwerp Diamonds	4	3	0	.571	74	48	
Leuven Lions	2	3	1	.333			
Bornem Titans	1	6	0	.143	26	176	
Ghent Gators	0	6	0	.000			L6

2007 Playoffs

LFFAB-only playoff round May 6, 2007 @ Charleroi
2	Charleroi Cougars	6
3	Brussels Tigers	0
1	Tournai Phoenix	50
4	La Louvière Wolves	0

Semifinals; May 20, 2007 @ Ostend/Tournai
1	West Flanders Tribes	55
2	Charleroi Cougars	6
1	Tournai Phoenix	7
2	Brussels Black Angels	9

Belgian Bowl XX; June 2, 2007 @ Brussels
1	West Flanders Tribes	35
2	Brussels Black Angels	13

=== 2008 season ===
FFL 2008 Standings
	W	L	T	PCT	PF	PA	STK
West Flanders Tribes	8	0	0	1.00	277	59	W8
Brussels Black Angels	6	2	0	.750	271	67	W1
Antwerp Diamonds	5	3	0	.625	101	76	L1
Ghent Gators	5	3	0	.625	146	122	W3
Bornem Titans	3	5	0	.375	39	190	L1
Leuven Lions	1	7	0	.125	66	175	L4
Brussels Bulls	0	8	0	.000	36	247	L8

2008 Playoffs

Quarterfinals; May 11 @ Charleroi/Brussels
2	Charleroi Cougars	12
3	Antwerp Diamonds	43
2	Brussels Black Angels	36
3	Brussels Tigers	0

Semifinals; May 18, 2008 @ Ostend/Tournai
1	West Flanders Tribes	13
3	Antwerp Diamonds	6
1	Tournai Phoenix	6
2	Brussels Black Angels	17

Belgian Bowl XXI; May 31, 2008 @ Anderlecht
1	West Flanders Tribes	25
2	Brussels Black Angels	20

=== 2009 season ===
FFL 2009 Standings
	W	L	T	PCT	PF	PA	STK
West Flanders Tribes	8	0	0	1.00	279	37	W8
Brussels Black Angels	7	1	0	.875	207	75	W6
Bornem Titans	4	4	0	.500	141	166	W3
Brussels Bulls	3	5	0	.375	159	194	L3
Leuven Lions	2	5	1	.313	78	168	L4
Antwerp Diamonds	2	6	0	.250	82	191	L2
Ghent Gators	1	6	1	.188	119	230	L1

2009 Playoffs

Quarterfinals; May 10 @ Charleroi/Anderlecht
2	Charleroi Cougars	48
3	Bornem Titans	26
2	Brussels Black Angels	50
3	Brussels Tigers	0

Semifinals; May 17, 2009 @ Ostend/Tournai
1	West Flanders Tribes	53
2	Charleroi Cougars	12
1	Tournai Phoenix	20
2	Brussels Black Angels	7

Belgian Bowl XXII; May 31, 2009 @ Brussels
1	West Flanders Tribes	12
1	Tournai Phoenix	0

=== 2010 season ===
FFL 2010 Standings
	W	L	T	PCT	PF	PA	STK
West Flanders Tribes	8	0	0	1.00	263	77	W8
Brussels Black Angels	7	1	0	.875	179	66	W4
Bornem Titans	5	3	0	.625	192	94	L2
Ghent Gators	4	3	1	.500	127	100	T1
Antwerp Diamonds	3	5	0	.375	79	170	W1
Brussels Bulls	2	6	0	.250	95	197	L3
Leuven Lions	1	6	1	.125	46	144	T1
Limburg Shotguns	1	7	0	.125	76	208	L2

2010 Playoffs

Quarterfinals; May 9, 2010 @ Tournai/Brussels
2	Tournai Phoenix	20
3	Bornem Titans	13
2	Brussels Black Angels	49
3	Dudelange Dragons	0

Semifinals; May 16, 2010 @ Ostend/Evere
1	West Flanders Tribes	32
2	Tournai Phoenix	0
1	Brussels Tigers	34
2	Brussels Black Angels	7

Belgian Bowl XXIII; May 29, 2010 @ Brussels
1	West Flanders Tribes	36
1	Brussels Tigers	6

=== 2011 season ===
FFL 2011 Standings
	W	L	T	PCT	PF	PA	STK
West Flanders Tribes	8	0	0	1.00	283	62	W8
Brussels Black Angels	6	1	1	.928	220	26	W5
Brussels Bulls	5	2	1	.688	253	52	W4
Bornem Titans	4	4	0	.500	114	142	L2
Antwerp Diamonds	3	5	0	.375	101	162	L2
Limburg Shotguns	2	6	0	.250	90	286	L4
Ghent Gators	2	6	0	.250	44	239	L1
Leuven Lions	1	7	0	.125	57	193	L7

2011 Playoffs

Quarterfinals; May 15 @ Charleroi/Anderlecht
2	Charleroi Cougars	0
3	Brussels Bulls	49
2	Brussels Black Angels	35
3	Ottignies Fighting Turtles	0

Semifinals; May 22, 2011 @ Izegem/Evere
1	West Flanders Tribes	27
3	Brussels Bulls	21
1	Brussels Tigers	10
2	Brussels Black Angels	38

Belgian Bowl XXIV; June 4, 2011 @ Ostend
1	West Flanders Tribes	20
2	Brussels Black Angels	14

=== 2012 season ===
FFL 2012 Standings
	W	L	T	PCT	PF	PA	STK
Brussels Bulls	5	1	0	.833	117	55	L1
West Flanders Tribes	4	1	1	.667	157	80	W3
Antwerp Diamonds	4	1	1	.667	78	47	W1
Brussels Black Angels	4	2	0	.667	77	37	W3
Ghent Gators	2	4	0	.333	76	114	L2
Leuven Lions	0	5	1	.000	57	95	L4
Puurs Titans	0	5	1	.000	47	183	L3
Limburg Shotguns (*)	-	-	-	-	-	-	-

- (*)Limburg Shotguns gave forfait for the entire 2012 season. The games the Shotguns played became null and void, as if they were never played.

2012 Playoffs

Quarterfinals; May 20, 2012 @ Ottignies, Ostend
2	Corbais Fighting Turtles	13
3	Antwerp Diamonds	22
2	West Flanders Tribes	42
3	Liège Monarchs	0

Semifinals; May 27, 2012 @ Molenbeek, Evere
1	Brussels Bulls	9
3	Antwerp Diamonds	12
1	Brussels Tigers	34
2	West Flanders Tribes	7

Belgian Bowl XXV; June 9, 2012 @ Ostend
3	Antwerp Diamonds	6
1	Brussels Tigers	46

=== 2013 season ===
FFL 2013 Standings
	W	L	T	PCT	PF	PA	STK
Brussels Bulls	6	0	0	1.00	178	14	W6
Brussels Black Angels	5	1	0	.833	127	29	W3
Puurs Titans	3	2	0	.600	81	54	W1
Leuven Lions	2	3	1	.417	56	96	L2
Antwerp Diamonds	1	3	1	.300	49	105	T1
Ghent Gators	1	4	1	.250	46	126	L2
Izegem Tribes	0	5	1	.083	49	162	T1

2013 Playoffs

Quarterfinals; May 12, 2013 @ TBD
2	Corbais Fighting Turtles	24
3	Puurs Titans	2
2	Brussels Black Angels
3	Liege Monarchs

Semifinals; May 19, 2013 @ TBD
1	Brussels Bulls	50
2	Corbais Fighting Turtles	14
1	Brussels Tigers	37
2	Brussels Black Angels	7

Belgian Bowl XXVI; June 2, 2013 @ Izegem
1	Brussels Bulls	0
1	Brussels Tigers	9

=== 2014 season ===
FAFL 2014 Standings
	W	L	T	PCT	PF	PA	STK
Ghent Gators	7	1	0	.875	288	65	W2
Brussels Black Angels	7	1	0	.875	226	66	W7
Ostend Pirates	6	2	0	.750	196	84	W4
Brussels Bulls	5	3	0	.625	158	73	W2
Leuven Lions	4	4	0	.500	148	138	W1
Puurs Titans	3	5	0	.375	84	219	L3
Limburg Shotguns	2	5	1	.313	80	208	L2
Izegem Tribes	1	6	1	.188	90	203	L3
Antwerp Diamonds	0	8	0	.000	51	265	L8

2014 Playoffs

Quarterfinals; June 8, 2014 @Grez-Doiceau @Anderlecht
2	Grez-Doiceau Fighting Turtles	22
3	Ostend Pirates	30
2	Brussels Black Angels	52
3	Liège Monarchs	12

Semifinals; June 15, 2014 @Gent @Evere
1	Ghent Gators	16
3	Ostend Pirates	14
1	Brussels Tigers	7
2	Brussels Black Angels	3

Belgian Bowl XXVII; June 29, 2014 @ Izegem
1	Ghent Gators	38
1	Brussels Tigers	0

== Statistics ==
=== FAFL titles ===
FAFL Titles
	Club	#	last	history
1	West Flanders Tribes	6	2011	2006, 2007, 2008, 2009, 2010, 2011
2	Brussels Bulls	2	2013	2012, 2013
3	Antwerp Diamonds	1	2005	2005
3	Ghent Gators	1	2014	2014

=== Playoff appearances ===
FAFL Teams playoff appearances
	Club	#	last	history
1	Brussels Black Angels	9	2014	2005, 2006, 2007, 2008, 2009, 2010, 2011, 2013, 2014
2	West Flanders Tribes	7	2012	**2006, 2007, 2008,** **2009, 2010, 2011**, 2012
3	Puurs Titans	3	2013	2009, 2010, 2013
3	Antwerp Diamonds	3	2012	**2005**, 2008, 2012
3	Brussels Bulls	3	2013	2011, 2012, 2013
6	Ghent Gators	1	2014	**2014**
6	Ostend Pirates	1	2014	2014

- years in **bold** are Belgian Bowl champions.
- Since 2008 there are three playoff tickets for the top three teams at the end of the regular season. There has been no number three ranked team that has qualified for the Belgian Bowl.
