= 2013 BFL season =

American football season in Belgium

- Total # of teams: 15
- Playoffs: May 12, 2013
- Belgian Bowl: Belgian Bowl XXVI
- Belgian Bowl Date: June 2, 2013
- Belgian Bowl Location: Izegem, Belgium
- Belgian Bowl Champions: Brussels Tigers
- FFL Champions: Brussels Bulls
- LFFAB Champions: Brussels Tigers

The 2013 season of the Belgian Football League (BFL) is the regular season played in the Belgium. The championship game is the Belgian Bowl XXVI.

== Regular season ==
=== Regular season standings ===
FFL 2013 Standings
	W	L	T	PCT	PF	PA	STK
Brussels Bulls	6	0	0	1.00	178	14	W6
Brussels Black Angels	5	1	0	.833	127	29	W3
Puurs Titans	3	2	0	.600	81	54	W1
Leuven Lions	2	3	1	.417	56	96	L2
Antwerp Diamonds	1	3	1	.300	49	105	T1
Ghent Gators	1	4	1	.250	46	126	L2
Izegem Tribes	0	5	1	.083	49	162	T1

LFFAB 2013 Standings
Group A 2013 Standings
	W	L	T	PCT	PF	PA
Brussels Tigers	7	0	0	1.000	301	26
Liège Monarchs	4	3	0	0.571	160	112
Andenne Bears	2	4	1	0.357	146	158
Luxembourg Steelers	0	7	0	0.000	26	311
Group B 2013 Standings
	W	L	T	PCT	PF	PA
Louvain Fighting Turtles	6	1	0	0.857	255	46
Tournai Phoenix	4	3	0	0.571	142	152
Waterloo Warriors	2	4	1	0.357	144	204
Charleroi Cougars	2	5	0	0.286	78	243

– clinched playoff berth

== Postseason ==
Quarterfinals; May 12, 2013 @ TBD
2	Corbais Fighting Turtles	24
3	Puurs Titans	2
2	Brussels Black Angels
3	Liege Monarchs

Semifinals; May 19, 2013 @ TBD
1	Brussels Bulls	50
2	Corbais Fighting Turtles	14
1	Brussels Tigers	37
2	Brussels Black Angels	7

Belgian Bowl XXVI; June 2, 2013 @ Izegem
1	Brussels Bulls	0
1	Brussels Tigers	9
