= 2005 BFL season =

- Total # of teams: 9
- Regular season: February 27
- Playoffs: May 22
- Belgian Bowl: Belgian Bowl XVIII
- Belgian Bowl Date: June 5
- Belgian Bowl Location: Tournai
- Belgian Bowl Champions: Antwerp Diamonds
- FFL Champions: Antwerp Diamonds
- LFFAB Champions: Tournai Phoenix

The 2005 season of the Belgian Football League (BFL) is the regular season played in the Belgium. The Antwerp Diamonds won Belgian Bowl XVIII against the Brussels Black Angels by a score of 13-2.

== Regular season ==
=== Regular season standings ===
FFL 2005 Standings
	W	L	T	PCT	PF	PA	STK
Antwerp Diamonds	6	0	0	1.00	90	41	W6
Brussels Black Angels	3	2	1	.500	100	58	
West Flanders Tribes	2	3	1	.333	55	71	W1
Leuven Lions	0	6	0	.000	44	119	L6

LFFAB 2005 Standings
	W	L	T	PCT	PF	PA	STK
Tournai Phoenix	3	0	1	.750	85	14	
Liège Red Roosters	3	1	0	.750	68	20	
Charleroi Cougars	2	1	1	.500	74	27	
Brussels Tigers	1	3	0	.250	66	56	
Andenne Bears	0	4	0	.000	0	180	L4

- clinched seed to the playoffs

== Postseason ==
Belgian Bowl XVIII
Antwerp Diamonds (FFL)	Brussels Black Angels (LFFAB)
13	2
- Date: June 5, 2005

LFFAB-only playoff rounds
Date	Winner	Score	Loser	Game field
April 24	Tournai Phoenix	34 - 0	Liège Red Roosters	Tournai
April 24	Charleroi Cougars	6 - 0	Brussels Tigers	Tournai
May 1	Tournai Phoenix	40 - 0	Charleroi Cougars	Flemalle
May 1	Liège Red Roosters	26 - 20	Brussels Tigers	Flemalle
May 8	Tournai Phoenix	26 - 0	Brussels Tigers	Liège
May 8	Liège Red Roosters	30 - 10	Charleroi Cougars	Liège

Semifinals; May 22, 2005 @ Antwerp/Tournai
1	Antwerp Diamonds	55
2	Liège Red Roosters	0
1	Tournai Phoenix	8
2	Brussels Black Angels	9

Belgian Bowl XVIII; June 5, 2005 @ Tournai
1	Antwerp Diamonds	13
2	Brussels Black Angels	2
