= Belgian Bowl XXII =

Tournai Phoenix (LFFAB)	West Flanders Tribes (FFL)
0	12
	1	2	3	4	Total
TP	0	0	0	0	0
WFT	0	0	6	6	12
- Date: May 31, 2009
- Stadium: I.S.B. Brussels

The Belgian Bowl XXII was held on May 31, 2009, and was won by the West Flanders Tribes for their fourth Championship in a row.

== 2009 Playoffs ==
The 2 teams that played in the Belgian Bowl were the winners of the Semi Finals. West Flanders Tribes and Tournai Phoenix received byes straight into the Semi Finals since they were the winners of seasonal play in the FFL and LFFAB respectively. The Quarterfinals were played on 10 May and the Semi Finals on 17 May.

Quarterfinals; May 10 @ Charleroi/Anderlecht
2	Charleroi Cougars	48
3	Bornem Titans	26
2	Brussels Black Angels	50
3	Brussels Tigers	0

Semifinals; May 17, 2009 @ Ostend/Tournai
1	West Flanders Tribes	53
2	Charleroi Cougars	12
1	Tournai Phoenix	20
2	Brussels Black Angels	7

Belgian Bowl XXII; May 31, 2009 @ Brussels
1	West Flanders Tribes	12
1	Tournai Phoenix	0
