= Belgian Bowl XVIII =

Antwerp Diamonds (FFL)	Brussels Black Angels (LFFAB)
13	2
- Date: June 5, 2005

Belgian Bowl XVIII was played in 2005 and was won by the Antwerp Diamonds. This was the third consecutive appearance of Antwerp in the Belgian Bowl and the second consecutive win.

== Playoffs ==
The 2 teams that play in the Belgian Bowl are the winners of the Belgian Bowl playoffs.

LFFAB-only playoff rounds
Date	Winner	Score	Loser	Game field
April 24	Tournai Phoenix	34 - 0	Liège Red Roosters	Tournai
April 24	Charleroi Cougars	6 - 0	Brussels Tigers	Tournai
May 1	Tournai Phoenix	40 - 0	Charleroi Cougars	Flemalle
May 1	Liège Red Roosters	26 - 20	Brussels Tigers	Flemalle
May 8	Tournai Phoenix	26 - 0	Brussels Tigers	Liège
May 8	Liège Red Roosters	30 - 10	Charleroi Cougars	Liège

Semifinals; May 22, 2005 @ Antwerp/Tournai
1	Antwerp Diamonds	55
2	Liège Red Roosters	0
1	Tournai Phoenix	8
2	Brussels Black Angels	9

Belgian Bowl XVIII; June 5, 2005 @ Tournai
1	Antwerp Diamonds	13
2	Brussels Black Angels	2
