= Belgian Bowl XX =

West Flanders Tribes (FFL)	Brussels Black Angels (FFL)
35	13
	1	2	3	4	Total
WFT	8	7	7	13	35
BBA	0	7	0	6	13
- Date: June 2, 2007
- Stadium: Berchem-Sainte-Agathe Stadium; Brussels

Belgian Bowl XX featured the West Flanders Tribes and the Brussels Black Angels in an American football game to decide the Belgian Football League (BFL) champion for the 2007 season. The Tribes won their 2nd Belgian Bowl in a row.

== Play Offs ==
The 2 teams that play in the Belgian Bowl are the winners of the Belgian Bowl playoffs.

LFFAB-only playoff round May 6, 2007 @ Charleroi
2	Charleroi Cougars	6
3	Brussels Tigers	0
1	Tournai Phoenix	50
4	La Louvière Wolves	0

Semifinals; May 20, 2007 @ Ostend/Tournai
1	West Flanders Tribes	55
2	Charleroi Cougars	6
1	Tournai Phoenix	7
2	Brussels Black Angels	9

Belgian Bowl XX; June 2, 2007 @ Brussels
1	West Flanders Tribes	35
2	Brussels Black Angels	13
