= Brussels Black Angels =

General information
- Founded: 1989
- Stadium: Brussels
- Headquartered: Brussels

League / conference affiliations
- Belgian Football League; Flemish American Football League

Championships
- League championships: 7; 2003, 2015, 2017, 2018, 2019, 2025, 2026
- Division championships: 0 None

Current uniform
Home

Away

The Brussels Black Angels are an American football team based in Brussels.The Black Angels were members of the Flemish American Football League (FAFL) conference in the Belgian Football League (BFL). They are currently playing in the Belgium Netherlands League (BNL).

== History ==
- 1987: Creation of the Waterloo All Stars
- 1989: Creation of the Brussels Angels American Football Club
- 1994: The Brussels Angels become an ASBL
- 2002: The Brussels Angels become the Brussels Black Angels

The American football team Brussels Angels actually originates in 1987 from the Waterloo All Stars because, at the time, they benefited from installations located in Waterloo. The team was founded by José Braga.

After a stay in Forest then in Uccle, where the team acquired its name of Brussels Angels, it finally settled in Woluwe Saint Lambert (better infrastructure, access and organisation, stadium of 9000 seats, etc.).

It is thus in 1989 that the Brussels Angels American Football Club was really created. At the time there were 17 players and the team participated in the Belgian championship organised by the Belgian Football League (BFL), itself founded in 1985 by a small group of Belgo-American amateurs. Under the impulse of coach Shariar Broumand, the sixth year of competition in second division saw the team winning the title of Champion of second division which allowed it to participate in the first division championship (2nd Division).

During the 1994 season the team officially became an ASBL. In progression, the Brussels Angels reach the championship's final in 1996 and will reiterate this achievement in 1997 and 1998 unfortunately without ever winning the title of Champion of Belgium. Being semi-finalist allowed the Angels to participate in the European competitions in 1997 and 1998. The two following years (1999 and 2000) saw the top Belgian, Dutch and Luxembourg teams compete in a Benelux championship, where the Angels took part thanks to their level of play. Twice the team reached the semi-finals.

=== 2001–2003 ===
The new millennium saw the arrival of two new coaches, Tuck MacRae and Rob Lake, followed in 2001 by Karl Heineman and Blake Turvey. The year 2001 corresponded also to the creation of a new committee led by Alexis Forrest with the aim to boost the team and renew its players and the results would not be long to come with a title of Belgian Champions in 2003. This coincided with the arrival of two new coaches, Tom Munson and Morris Jablonka, replacing Blake Turvey and Rob Lake.

2001 BFL Division I Standings
Pos	Team	Pld	W	L	D	PF	PA	PD	PCT	STK
1	Izegem Redskins	5	5	0	0	76	29	+47	1.000	W5
2	Charleroi Cougars	5	3	2	0	74	45	+29	.600	
3	Liège Red Roosters	4	1	3	0	60	58	+2	.250	
4	Brussels Angels	4	0	4	0	12	90	−78	.000	L4

2001 Playoffs

Wildcard round May 13, 2001 @ Liège
4	Brussels Angels	26
W	Antwerp Diamonds	6
3	Liège Red Roosters	0
W	Brussels Tigers	28

Semifinals; May 20, 2001 @ Waregem
1	Izegem Redskins	42
4	Brussels Angels	14
2	Charleroi Cougars	6
W	Brussels Tigers	20

Belgian Bowl XIV; June 3, 2001 @ Ghent
1	Izegem Redskins	22
W	Brussels Tigers	0

BFL 2002 Standings
	W	L	T	PCT	PF	PA	STK
BFL West 2002 Standings
Antwerp Diamonds	8	0	0	1.00	286	24	W8
Tournai Phoenix	6	2	0	.750	184	78	
West Flanders Tribes	4	3	1	.500	146	90	W1
Ghent Gators	0	8	0	.000	6	299	L8
BFL East 2002 Standings
Brussels Tigers	6	2	0	.750	158	66	
Brussels Angels	4	3	1	.500	160	97	
Flemalle Flames	4	4	0	.500	202	162	
Charleroi Cougars	2	6	0	.250	124	194	
Liège Red Roosters	1	7	0	.125	40	302	

2002 Playoffs

Semifinals; May 19, 2002 @ Antwerp
1	Antwerp Diamonds	30
2	Brussels Angels	8
1	Brussels Tigers	8
3	West Flanders Tribes	6

Belgian Bowl XV; June 2, 2002 @ Ingelmunster
1	Antwerp Diamonds	14
1	Brussels Tigers	24

BFL 2003 Standings
	W	L	T	PCT	PF	PA	STK
BFL West 2003 Standings
Antwerp Diamonds	4	1	0	.800	118	40	
West Flanders Tribes	2	2	1	.400	74	68	T1
BFL East 2003 Standings
Brussels Black Angels	4	1	0	.800	140	34	
Flemalle Flames	3	2	0	.600	64	45	
Charleroi Cougars	1	3	1	.200	26	86	
Liège Red Roosters	0	5	0	.000	13	164	L5

=== 2004 season ===
BFL 2004 Standings
	W	L	T	PCT	PF	PA	STK
Antwerp Diamonds	8	0	0	1.00	306	0	W8
Leuven Lions	7	1	0	.875	161	43	
Brussels Black Angels	6	2	0	.750	143	46	
Charleroi Cougars	6	3	0	.667	75	115	
Liège Red Roosters	4	4	1	.444	92	161	
Tournai Phoenix	3	5	0	.375	101	94	
Flemalle Flames	3	5	1	.333	78	152	
West Flanders Tribes	2	5	1	.250	68	70	L1
Brussels Tigers	1	8	0	.111	12	177	
Ghent Gators	0	7	1	.000	32	207	

2004 Playoffs

Semifinals; May 23, 2004 @ Antwerp/Leuven
1	Antwerp Diamonds	20
4	Charleroi Cougars	10
2	Leuven Lions	31
3	Brussels Black Angels	20

Belgian Bowl XVII; June 6, 2004 @ Charleroi
1	Antwerp Diamonds	12
2	Leuven Lions	0

=== 2005 season ===
FFL 2005 Standings
	W	L	T	PCT	PF	PA	STK
Antwerp Diamonds	6	0	0	1.00	90	41	W6
Brussels Black Angels	3	2	1	.500	100	58	
West Flanders Tribes	2	3	1	.333	55	71	W1
Leuven Lions	0	6	0	.000	44	119	L6

2005 Playoffs

LFFAB-only playoff rounds
Date	Winner	Score	Loser	Game field
April 24	Tournai Phoenix	34 - 0	Liège Red Roosters	Tournai
April 24	Charleroi Cougars	6 - 0	Brussels Tigers	Tournai
May 1	Tournai Phoenix	40 - 0	Charleroi Cougars	Flemalle
May 1	Liège Red Roosters	26 - 20	Brussels Tigers	Flemalle
May 8	Tournai Phoenix	26 - 0	Brussels Tigers	Liège
May 8	Liège Red Roosters	30 - 10	Charleroi Cougars	Liège

Semifinals; May 22, 2005 @ Antwerp/Tournai
1	Antwerp Diamonds	55
2	Liège Red Roosters	0
1	Tournai Phoenix	8
2	Brussels Black Angels	9

Belgian Bowl XVIII; June 5, 2005 @ Tournai
1	Antwerp Diamonds	12
2	Brussels Black Angels	2

=== 2006 season ===
FFL 2006 Standings
	W	L	T	PCT	PF	PA	STK
West Flanders Tribes	6	1	0	.857	175	75	L1
Brussels Black Angels	6	1	0	.857	199	39	
Antwerp Diamonds	5	2	0	.714			
Leuven Lions	3	4	0	.429	101	115	
Bornem Titans	1	6	0	.143	32	177	
Ghent Gators	0	7	0	.000	56	196	L7

2006 Playoffs

LFFAB-only playoff round May 7, 2006 @ Charleroi
2	Charleroi Cougars	28
3	Liège Monarchs	0
1	Tournai Phoenix	50
4	Andenne Bears	0

Semifinals; May 21, 2006 @ Ostend/Tournai
1	West Flanders Tribes	26
2	Charleroi Cougars	0
1	Tournai Phoenix	14
2	Brussels Black Angels	9

Belgian Bowl XIX; June 4, 2006 @ Brussels
1	West Flanders Tribes	23
1	Tournai Phoenix	14

=== 2007 season ===
FFL 2007 Standings
	W	L	T	PCT	PF	PA	STK
West Flanders Tribes	6	0	1	.857	198	34	W6
Brussels Black Angels	6	1	0	.857	148	51	
Antwerp Diamonds	4	3	0	.571	74	48	
Leuven Lions	2	3	1	.333			
Bornem Titans	1	6	0	.143	26	176	
Ghent Gators	0	6	0	.000			L6

2007 Playoffs

LFFAB-only playoff round May 6, 2007 @ Charleroi
2	Charleroi Cougars	6
3	Brussels Tigers	0
1	Tournai Phoenix	50
4	La Louvière Wolves	0

Semifinals; May 20, 2007 @ Ostend/Tournai
1	West Flanders Tribes	55
2	Charleroi Cougars	6
1	Tournai Phoenix	7
2	Brussels Black Angels	9

Belgian Bowl XX; June 2, 2007 @ Brussels
1	West Flanders Tribes	35
2	Brussels Black Angels	13

=== 2008 season ===
FFL 2008 Standings
	W	L	T	PCT	PF	PA	STK
West Flanders Tribes	8	0	0	1.00	277	59	W8
Brussels Black Angels	6	2	0	.750	271	67	W1
Antwerp Diamonds	5	3	0	.625	101	76	L1
Ghent Gators	5	3	0	.625	146	122	W3
Bornem Titans	3	5	0	.375	39	190	L1
Leuven Lions	1	7	0	.125	66	175	L4
Brussels Bulls	0	8	0	.000	36	247	L8

2008 Playoffs

Quarterfinals; May 11 @ Charleroi/Brussels
2	Charleroi Cougars	12
3	Antwerp Diamonds	43
2	Brussels Black Angels	36
3	Brussels Tigers	0

Semifinals; May 18, 2008 @ Ostend/Tournai
1	West Flanders Tribes	13
3	Antwerp Diamonds	6
1	Tournai Phoenix	6
2	Brussels Black Angels	17

Belgian Bowl XXI; May 31, 2008 @ Anderlecht
1	West Flanders Tribes	25
2	Brussels Black Angels	20

=== 2009 season ===
FFL 2009 Standings
	W	L	T	PCT	PF	PA	STK
West Flanders Tribes	8	0	0	1.00	279	37	W8
Brussels Black Angels	7	1	0	.875	207	75	W6
Bornem Titans	4	4	0	.500	141	166	W3
Brussels Bulls	3	5	0	.375	159	194	L3
Leuven Lions	2	5	1	.313	78	168	L4
Antwerp Diamonds	2	6	0	.250	82	191	L2
Ghent Gators	1	6	1	.188	119	230	L1

2009 Playoffs

Quarterfinals; May 10 @ Charleroi/Anderlecht
2	Charleroi Cougars	48
3	Bornem Titans	26
2	Brussels Black Angels	50
3	Brussels Tigers	0

Semifinals; May 17, 2009 @ Ostend/Tournai
1	West Flanders Tribes	53
2	Charleroi Cougars	12
1	Tournai Phoenix	20
2	Brussels Black Angels	7

Belgian Bowl XXII; May 31, 2009 @ Brussels
1	West Flanders Tribes	12
1	Tournai Phoenix	0

=== 2010 season ===
Black Angels 2010 Season
Week	Date	Kickoff	Visitors	Results	Home	Game Site
1	14-02	Bye week due to bad weather: (rescheduled 04-04)				
2	21-02	12.30	Brussels Black Angels	20 - 12	Antwerp Diamonds	Ghent
3	28-02	12.30	Limburg Shotguns	(02-05)	Brussels Black Angels	Izegem
4	07-03	12.30	Brussels Black Angels	20 - 12	Ghent Gators	Ostend
5	14-03	15.00	Leuven Lions	0 - 23	Brussels Black Angels	Brussels (BBA)
6	21-03	Bye				
7	28-03	15.00	West Flanders Tribes	33 - 7	Brussels Black Angels	Brussels
8	04-04	15.00	Brussels Black Angels	50 - 0	Brussels Bulls	Brussels (BB)
9	11-04	15.00	Bornem Titans	6 - 13	Brussels Black Angels	Brussels (BBA)
10	18-04	Bye				
11	25-04	15.00	Brussels Black Angels	13 - 3	Bornem Titans	Bornem
12	02-05	12.30	Limburg Shotguns	0 - 33	Brussels Black Angels	Izegem
Post Season
13	09-05	14.00	Dudelange Dragons	0 - 49	Brussels Black Angels	Brussels (BBA)
14	16-05	14.00	Brussels Black Angels	7 - 34	Brussels Tigers	Brussels (BT)

COLOR KEY:

- Win - Tie - Loss.
- The game on week 3 was rescheduled due to a frozen underground of the gamefield.

FFL 2010 Standings
	W	L	T	PCT	PF	PA	STK
West Flanders Tribes	8	0	0	1.00	263	77	W8
Brussels Black Angels	7	1	0	.875	179	66	W4
Bornem Titans	5	3	0	.625	192	94	L2
Ghent Gators	4	3	1	.500	127	100	T1
Antwerp Diamonds	3	5	0	.375	79	170	W1
Brussels Bulls	2	6	0	.250	95	197	L3
Leuven Lions	1	6	1	.125	46	144	T1
Limburg Shotguns	1	7	0	.125	76	208	L2

2010 Playoffs

Quarterfinals; May 9, 2010 @ Tournai/Brussels
2	Tournai Phoenix	20
3	Bornem Titans	13
2	Brussels Black Angels	49
3	Dudelange Dragons	0

Semifinals; May 16, 2010 @ Ostend/Evere
1	West Flanders Tribes	32
2	Tournai Phoenix	0
1	Brussels Tigers	34
2	Brussels Black Angels	7

Belgian Bowl XXIII; May 29, 2010 @ Brussels
1	West Flanders Tribes	36
1	Brussels Tigers	6

=== 2011 season ===
FFL 2011 Standings
	W	L	T	PCT	PF	PA	STK
West Flanders Tribes	8	0	0	1.00	283	62	W8
Brussels Black Angels	6	1	1	.928	220	26	W5
Brussels Bulls	5	2	1	.688	253	52	W4
Bornem Titans	4	4	0	.500	114	142	L2
Antwerp Diamonds	3	5	0	.375	101	162	L2
Limburg Shotguns	2	6	0	.250	90	286	L4
Ghent Gators	2	6	0	.250	44	239	L1
Leuven Lions	1	7	0	.125	57	193	L7

2011 Playoffs

Quarterfinals; May 15 @ Charleroi/Anderlecht
2	Charleroi Cougars	0
3	Brussels Bulls	49
2	Brussels Black Angels	35
3	Ottignies Fighting Turtles	0

Semifinals; May 22, 2011 @ Izegem/Evere
1	West Flanders Tribes	27
3	Brussels Bulls	21
1	Brussels Tigers	10
2	Brussels Black Angels	38

Belgian Bowl XXIV; June 4, 2011 @ Ostend
1	West Flanders Tribes	20
2	Brussels Black Angels	14

=== 2012 season ===
FFL 2012 Standings
	W	L	T	PCT	PF	PA	STK
Brussels Bulls	5	1	0	.833	117	55	L1
West Flanders Tribes	4	1	1	.667	157	80	W3
Antwerp Diamonds	4	1	1	.667	78	47	W1
Brussels Black Angels	4	2	0	.667	77	37	W3
Ghent Gators	2	4	0	.333	76	114	L2
Leuven Lions	0	5	1	.000	57	95	L4
Puurs Titans	0	5	1	.000	47	183	L3
Limburg Shotguns (*)	-	-	-	-	-	-	-

- (*)Limburg Shotguns gave forfait for the entire 2012 season. The games the Shotguns played became null and void, as if they were never played.

=== 2013 season ===
FFL 2013 Standings
	W	L	T	PCT	PF	PA	STK
Brussels Bulls	6	0	0	1.00	178	14	W6
Brussels Black Angels	5	1	0	.833	127	29	W3
Puurs Titans	3	2	0	.600	81	54	W1
Leuven Lions	2	3	1	.417	56	96	L2
Antwerp Diamonds	1	3	1	.300	49	105	T1
Ghent Gators	1	4	1	.250	46	126	L2
Izegem Tribes	0	5	1	.083	49	162	T1

2013 Playoffs

Quarterfinals; May 12, 2013 @ TBD
2	Corbais Fighting Turtles	24
3	Puurs Titans	2
2	Brussels Black Angels
3	Liege Monarchs

Semifinals; May 19, 2013 @ TBD
1	Brussels Bulls	50
2	Corbais Fighting Turtles	14
1	Brussels Tigers	37
2	Brussels Black Angels	7

Belgian Bowl XXVI; June 2, 2013 @ Izegem
1	Brussels Bulls	0
1	Brussels Tigers	9

=== 2014 season ===
FAFL 2014 Standings
	W	L	T	PCT	PF	PA	STK
Ghent Gators	7	1	0	.875	288	65	W2
Brussels Black Angels	7	1	0	.875	226	66	W7
Ostend Pirates	6	2	0	.750	196	84	W4
Brussels Bulls	5	3	0	.625	158	73	W2
Leuven Lions	4	4	0	.500	148	138	W1
Puurs Titans	3	5	0	.375	84	219	L3
Limburg Shotguns	2	5	1	.313	80	208	L2
Izegem Tribes	1	6	1	.188	90	203	L3
Antwerp Diamonds	0	8	0	.000	51	265	L8

2014 Playoffs

Quarterfinals; June 8, 2014 @Grez-Doiceau @Anderlecht
2	Grez-Doiceau Fighting Turtles	22
3	Ostend Pirates	30
2	Brussels Black Angels	52
3	Liège Monarchs	12

Semifinals; June 15, 2014 @Gent @Evere
1	Ghent Gators	16
3	Ostend Pirates	14
1	Brussels Tigers	7
2	Brussels Black Angels	3

Belgian Bowl XXVII; June 29, 2014 @ Izegem
1	Ghent Gators	38
1	Brussels Tigers	0

=== 2015 season ===
FAFL 2015 Standings
	W	L	T	PCT	PF	PA	STK
Brussels Black Angels	7	0	0	1.00	295		W7
Ghent Gators	6	1	0	0.857	216		L1
Ostend Pirates	5	2	0	.714	187		
Izegem Tribes	4	3	0	.571	114		
Antwerp Diamonds	2	5	0	.286	68		
Leuven Lions	2	5	0	.167	84		W
Limburg Shotguns	1	6	0	.143	85		L
Puurs Titans	1	6	0	.143	71		

2015 Playoffs

Quarterfinals; June 7th, 2015
2	Liège Monarchs	12
3	Ostend Pirates	22
2	Ghent Gators	22
3	Waterloo Warriors	24

Semifinals; June 14th, 2015
1	Brussels Black Angels	14
3	Ostend Pirates	6
1	Brussels Tigers	56
3	Waterloo Warriors	14

Belgian Bowl XXVIII; June 27th, 2015 @ Sint-Niklaas
1	Brussels Tigers	8
1	Brussels Black Angels	13

2023 Season

== Statistics ==
=== Performance (2000–2011) ===
This is an overview of the performance of the Black Angels against the teams in the FFL during the BFL regular and post seasons from 2000 until 2011.

Overview Black Angels 2000-2011 performance
Opponent	W	L	T	PCT	Last match	Last win	Last loss
FFL Teams
Antwerp Diamonds	9	7	0	.563	April 17, 2011	April 17, 2011	
Bornem Titans	9	0	0	1.00	March 20, 2011	March 20, 2011	None
Brussels Bulls	4	0	1	.800	March 13, 2011	April 4, 2010	None
Ghent Gators	8	0	0	1.00	April 3, 2011	April 3, 2011	None
Leuven Lions	11	1	0	.917	Februari 27, 2011	Februari 27, 2011	
Limburg Shotguns	2	0	0	1.00	May 1, 2011	May 1, 2011	None
West Flanders Tribes	2	14	2	.111	February 26, 2012	April 17, 2005	February 26, 2012

== Achievements ==
- 1994: Winner of Belgian Championship 2nd Division
- 1996: Vice-Champion of Belgium (Division 1)
- 1997: Vice-Champion of Belgium (Division 1)
- 1998: Vice-Champion of Belgium (Division 1)
- 1997: participation on the Eurocup
- 1998: participation on the Eurocup
- 1999: Participation in the Benelux Championship
- 2000: Participation in the Benelux Championship
- 2003: Winner of Belgian Championship
- 2004: Semi-finaliste of Belgian Championship
- 2005: Vice Champion of Belgium
- 2006: Semi-finaliste of Belgian Championship
- 2007: Vice Champion of Belgium
- 2008: Vice Champion of Belgium
- 2009: Semi-finaliste of Belgian Championship
- 2010: Semi-finaliste of Belgian Championship
- 2011: Vice-Champion of Belgium
- 2015: Champion of Belgium
- 2017: Champion of Belgium
- 2018: Champion of Belgium
- 2019: Champion of Belgium
- 2023: Vice-Champion BNL Football League
- 2025: Champion of Belgium
- 2026: Champion of Belgium
