= Ligue Francophone de Football Americain de Belgique =

Belgian Football League conference

- Sport: American football
- Founded: 2003
- President: Frédéric Meysman
- No. of teams: 9
- Country: Belgium
- Most recent champion: Brussels Tigers
- Most titles: 5 - Tournai Phoenix
- Website: lffa.be

The Ligue Francophone de Football Americain de Belgique (LFFA) is one of the two conferences of the Belgian Football League (BFL). It consists of teams from the French Community, whereas the Flemish American Football League (FFL) consists of teams from the Flemish Community. The top three teams from the Francophone League qualify for the BFL playoffs at the conclusion of the regular season. The playoffs determine which teams play in the Belgian Bowl.

== Teams ==
There are 8 LFFAB teams. The Wolves are currently on hold. Luxembourg Steelers left in 2026 for Germany Oberliga.

Team	City/Area	Founded	Head coach	Website
Ligue Francophone de Football Americain de Belgique, LFFAB, French Community
Andenne Bears	Andenne, BE	2002	Didier Smeyers	
Brussels Tigers	Brussels, BE	1998	Pascal DeCoo & Alexandre DeConinck	Tigers
Charleroi Coal Miners	Charleroi, BE	2013	Julien Bozzini	CoalMiners
Grez-Doiceau Fighting Turtles	Grez-Doiceau, BE	2008	David Vandersmissen	Turtles
La Louvière Wolves*	La Louvière, BE	2005	Thibaut Dubois	Wolves
Liège Monarchs	Liège, BE	1986	Luis Iglesias Alvarez	Monarchs
Luxembourg Steelers	Dudelange, LUX	1993	Marc Watry	Steelers
Tournai Phoenix	Tournai, BE	1984	Roel Bernaerts	Phoenix
Waterloo Warriors	Waterloo, BE	2011		Warriors
Mons Knights	Mons Belgium	2012	Andy Brutyn	Mons Knights

- On hold*

== Season-by-season records ==
W = Wins, L = Losses, T = Ties, PCT = Winning Percentage, PF= Points For, PA = Points Against
- clinched seed to the playoffs

=== 2005 season ===
LFFAB 2005 Standings
	W	L	T	PCT	PF	PA	STK
Tournai Phoenix	3	0	1	.750	85	14	
Liège Red Roosters	3	1	0	.750	68	20	
Charleroi Cougars	2	1	1	.500	74	27	
Brussels Tigers	1	3	0	.250	66	56	
Andenne Bears	0	4	0	.000	0	180	L4

2005 Playoffs

LFFAB-only playoff rounds
Date	Winner	Score	Loser	Game field
April 24	Tournai Phoenix	34 - 0	Liège Red Roosters	Tournai
April 24	Charleroi Cougars	6 - 0	Brussels Tigers	Tournai
May 1	Tournai Phoenix	40 - 0	Charleroi Cougars	Flemalle
May 1	Liège Red Roosters	26 - 20	Brussels Tigers	Flemalle
May 8	Tournai Phoenix	26 - 0	Brussels Tigers	Liège
May 8	Liège Red Roosters	30 - 10	Charleroi Cougars	Liège

Semifinals; May 22, 2005 @ Antwerp/Tournai
1	Antwerp Diamonds	55
2	Liège Red Roosters	0
1	Tournai Phoenix	8
2	Brussels Black Angels	9

Belgian Bowl XVIII; June 5, 2005 @ Tournai
1	Antwerp Diamonds	13
2	Brussels Black Angels	2

=== 2006 season ===
LFFAB 2006 Standings
	W	L	T	PCT	PF	PA	STK
Tournai Phoenix	5	0	0	1.00	188	0	W5
Charleroi Cougars	3	3	0	.500	122	61	
Liège Red Roosters	3	2	0	.600	116	83	
Andenne Bears	0	6	0	.000	0	282	L6

2006 Playoffs

LFFAB-only playoff round May 7, 2006 @ Charleroi
2	Charleroi Cougars	28
3	Liège Monarchs	0
1	Tournai Phoenix	50
4	Andenne Bears	0

Semifinals; May 21, 2006 @ Ostend/Tournai
1	West Flanders Tribes	26
2	Charleroi Cougars	0
1	Tournai Phoenix	14
2	Brussels Black Angels	9

Belgian Bowl XIX; June 4, 2006 @ Brussels
1	West Flanders Tribes	23
1	Tournai Phoenix	14

=== 2007 season ===
LFFAB 2007 Standings
	W	L	T	PCT	PF	PA	STK
Tournai Phoenix	6	0	0	1.00	250	0	W6
Charleroi Cougars	5	1	0	.833	165	59	
Brussels Tigers	4	2	0	.667	76	43	
La Louvière Wolves	3	3	0	.500	74	134	
Liège Red Roosters	2	4	0	.333	92	103	
Andenne Bears	1	5	0	.167	47	147	
Flemalle Flames	0	6	0	.000	14	232	L6

2007 Playoffs

LFFAB-only playoff round May 6, 2007 @ Charleroi
2	Charleroi Cougars	6
3	Brussels Tigers	0
1	Tournai Phoenix	50
4	La Louvière Wolves	0

Semifinals; May 20, 2007 @ Ostend/Tournai
1	West Flanders Tribes	55
2	Charleroi Cougars	6
1	Tournai Phoenix	7
2	Brussels Black Angels	9

Belgian Bowl XX; June 2, 2007 @ Brussels
1	West Flanders Tribes	35
2	Brussels Black Angels	13

=== 2008 season ===
LFFAB 2008 Standings
	W	L	T	PCT	PF	PA	STK
Tournai Phoenix	8	0	0	1.00	372	12	W8
Charleroi Cougars	6	2	0	.750	288	119	
Brussels Tigers	6	2	0	.750	352	109	
Andenne Bears	5	3	0	.375	92	200	
Liège Red Roosters	3	5	0	.375	81	238	
La Louvière Wolves	2	6	0	.250	59	281	
Flemalle Flames	0	8	0	.000	40	298	L8

2008 Playoffs

Quarterfinals; May 11 @ Charleroi/Brussels
2	Charleroi Cougars	12
3	Antwerp Diamonds	43
2	Brussels Black Angels	36
3	Brussels Tigers	0

Semifinals; May 18, 2008 @ Ostend/Tournai
1	West Flanders Tribes	13
3	Antwerp Diamonds	6
1	Tournai Phoenix	6
2	Brussels Black Angels	17

Belgian Bowl XXI; May 31, 2008 @ Anderlecht
1	West Flanders Tribes	25
2	Brussels Black Angels	20

=== 2009 season ===
LFFAB 2009 Standings
	W	L	T	PCT	PF	PA	STK
Tournai Phoenix	7	0	0	1.00	265	8	W7
Charleroi Cougars	5	2	0	.714	160	134	
Brussels Tigers	5	2	0	.714	144	53	
Dudelange Dragons	2	5	0	.286	62	185	
Andenne Bears	2	5	0	.286	51	116	
Liège Monarchs	0	7	0	.000	46	232	L7
La Louvière Wolves*	-	-	-	-	-	-	-

- (*) La Louvière Wolves did not participate this season.

2009 Playoffs

Quarterfinals; May 10 @ Charleroi/Anderlecht
2	Charleroi Cougars	48
3	Bornem Titans	26
2	Brussels Black Angels	50
3	Brussels Tigers	0

Semifinals; May 17, 2009 @ Ostend/Tournai
1	West Flanders Tribes	53
2	Charleroi Cougars	12
1	Tournai Phoenix	20
2	Brussels Black Angels	7

Belgian Bowl XXII; May 31, 2009 @ Brussels
1	West Flanders Tribes	12
1	Tournai Phoenix	0

=== 2010 season ===
LFFAB 2010 Standings
	W	L	T	PCT	PF	PA	STK
Brussels Tigers	6	0	0	1.00	280	6	W5
Tournai Phoenix	4	1	1	.660	182	24	L1
Dudelange Dragons	3	2	1	.500	141	86	L1
Charleroi Cougars	2	2	2	.330	78	98	L1
Ottignies Fighting Turtles	1	4	1	.160	36	124	L1
Andenne Bears	0	3	3	.000	32	158	L3
Liège Monarchs	0	5	1	.000	28	186	L3
La Louvière Wolves*	-	-	-	-	-	-	-

- (*) La Louvière Wolves did not participate this season.

2010 Playoffs

Quarterfinals; May 9, 2010 @ Tournai/Brussels
2	Tournai Phoenix	20
3	Bornem Titans	13
2	Brussels Black Angels	49
3	Dudelange Dragons	0

Semifinals; May 16, 2010 @ Ostend/Evere
1	West Flanders Tribes	32
2	Tournai Phoenix	0
1	Brussels Tigers	34
2	Brussels Black Angels	7

Belgian Bowl XXIII; May 29, 2010 @ Brussels
1	West Flanders Tribes	36
1	Brussels Tigers	6

=== 2011 season ===
LFFAB 2011 Standings
	W	L	T	PCT	PF	PA	STK
Brussels Tigers	6	0	0	1.00	257	2	W6
Charleroi Cougars	3	3	0	.500	90	140	W1
Ottignies Fighting Turtles	3	3	0	.500	155	76	W3
Liège Monarchs	2	3	1	.333	90	109	L1
Andenne Bears	0	5	1	.167	16	220	L5
Tournai Phoenix*	-	-	-	-	-	-	-
Dudelange Dragons**	-	-	-	-	-	-	-
La Louvière Wolves**	-	-	-	-	-	-	-

- (*)Tournai phoenix gave forfait for the entire 2011 season. The games Tournai played became null and void, as if they were never played.
- (**) La Louvière Wolves and Dudelange Dragons did not participate this season.

2011 Playoffs

Quarterfinals; May 15 @ Charleroi/Anderlecht
2	Charleroi Cougars	0
3	Brussels Bulls	49
2	Brussels Black Angels	35
3	Ottignies Fighting Turtles	0

Semifinals; May 22, 2011 @ Izegem/Evere
1	West Flanders Tribes	27
3	Brussels Bulls	21
1	Brussels Tigers	10
2	Brussels Black Angels	38

Belgian Bowl XXIV; June 4, 2011 @ Ostend
1	West Flanders Tribes	20
2	Brussels Black Angels	14

=== 2012 season ===
LFFAB 2012 Standings
	W	L	T	PCT	PF	PA	STK
Brussels Tigers	8	0	0	1.00	310	20	W8
Corbais Fighting Turtles	6	2	0	.750	206	93	
Liège Monarchs	4	4	0	.500	146	152	
Charleroi Cougars	4	4	0	.500	160	170	
Andenne Bears	3	5	0	.375	142	200	
Tournai Phoenix	1	6	1	.125	138	235	
Luxembourg Steelers	1	6	1	.125	54	247	

2012 Playoffs

Quarterfinals; May 20, 2012 @ Ottignies, Ostend
2	Corbais Fighting Turtles	13
3	Antwerp Diamonds	22
2	West Flanders Tribes	42
3	Liège Monarchs	0

Semifinals; May 27, 2012 @ Molenbeek, Evere
1	Brussels Bulls	9
3	Antwerp Diamonds	12
1	Brussels Tigers	34
2	West Flanders Tribes	7

Belgian Bowl XXV; June 9, 2012 @ Ostend
3	Antwerp Diamonds	6
1	Brussels Tigers	46

=== 2013 season ===
LFFAB 2013 Standings
Group A 2013 Standings
	W	L	T	PCT	PF	PA
Brussels Tigers	7	0	0	1.000	301	26
Liège Monarchs	4	3	0	0.571	160	112
Andenne Bears	2	4	1	0.357	146	158
Luxembourg Steelers	0	7	0	0.000	26	311
Group B 2013 Standings
	W	L	T	PCT	PF	PA
Louvain Fighting Turtles	6	1	0	0.857	255	46
Tournai Phoenix	4	3	0	0.571	142	152
Waterloo Warriors	2	4	1	0.357	144	204
Charleroi Cougars	2	5	0	0.286	78	243

2013 Playoffs

Quarterfinals; May 12, 2013 @ TBD
2	Corbais Fighting Turtles	24
3	Puurs Titans	2
2	Brussels Black Angels
3	Liege Monarchs

Semifinals; May 19, 2013 @ TBD
1	Brussels Bulls	50
2	Corbais Fighting Turtles	14
1	Brussels Tigers	37
2	Brussels Black Angels	7

Belgian Bowl XXVI; June 2, 2013 @ Izegem
1	Brussels Bulls	0
1	Brussels Tigers	9

=== 2014 season ===
LFFAB 2014 Standings
	W	L	T	PCT	PF	PA	STK
Brussels Tigers	5	0	0	1.00	212	26	W5
Grez-Doiceau Fighting Turtles	4	1	0	.800	159	68	W2
Liège Monarchs	3	2	0	.600	152	87	W1
Waterloo Warriors	2	3	0	.400	132	116	L3
Charleroi Coal Miners	1	4	0	.200	42	196	W1
Tournai Phoenix	0	5	0	.000	19	247	L4
Andenne Bears	-	-	-	-	-	-	-
Luxembourg Steelers	-	-	-	-	-	-	-

2014 Playoffs

Quarterfinals; June 8, 2014 @Grez-Doiceau @Anderlecht
2	Grez-Doiceau Fighting Turtles	22
3	Ostend Pirates	30
2	Brussels Black Angels	52
3	Liège Monarchs	12

Semifinals; June 15, 2014 @Gent @Evere
1	Ghent Gators	16
3	Ostend Pirates	14
1	Brussels Tigers	7
2	Brussels Black Angels	3

Belgian Bowl XXVII; June 29, 2014 @ Izegem
1	Ghent Gators	38
1	Brussels Tigers	0
