= Hank Bachmeier =

American football player (born 1999)

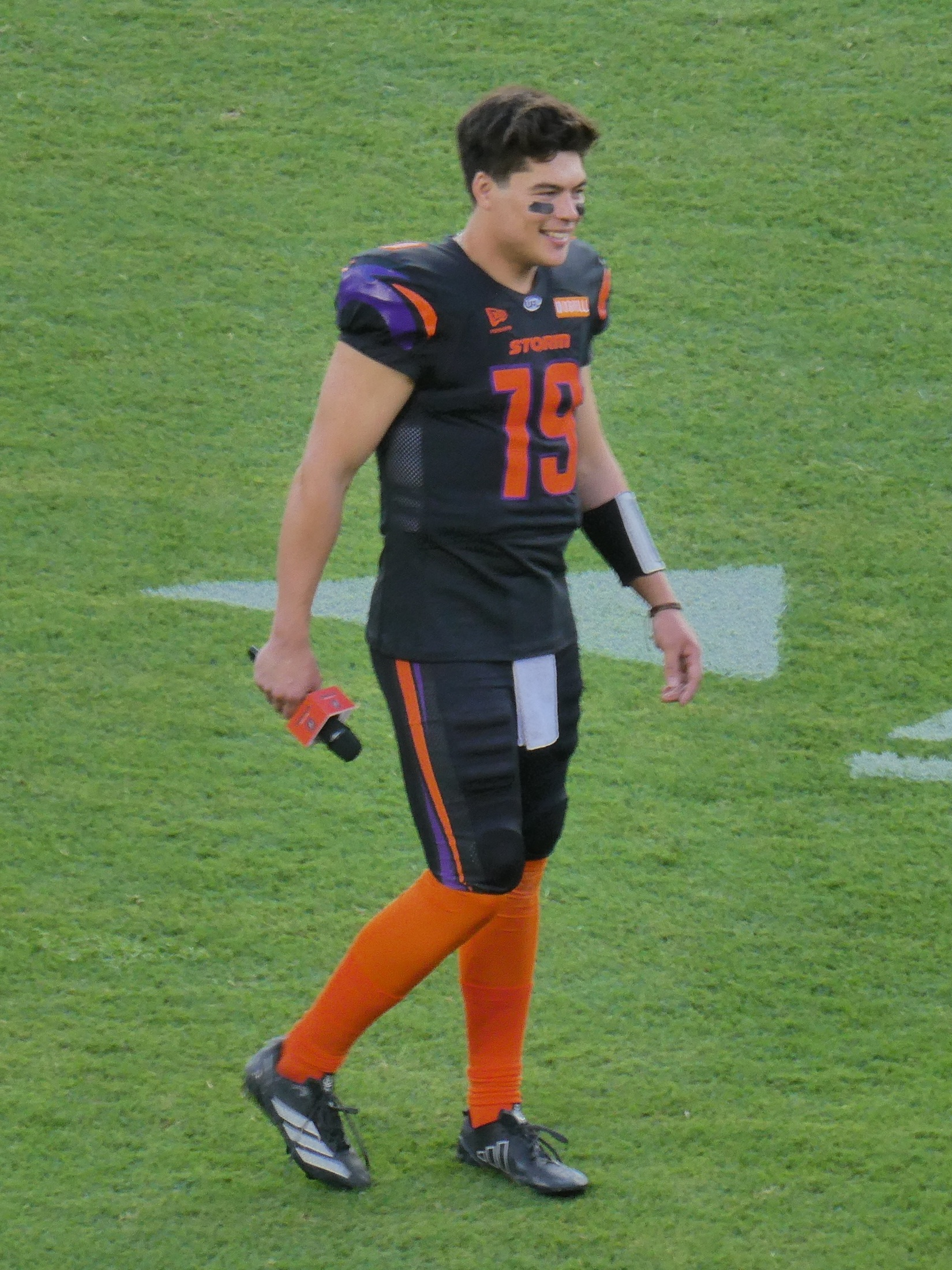
- Bachmeier with Orlando Storm in 2026

No. 8 – Alpine Rams
- Position: Quarterback
- Roster status: Active

Personal information
- Born: July 14, 1999 (age 27); Murrieta, California, U.S.
- Listed height: 6 ft 1 in (1.85 m)
- Listed weight: 208 lb (94 kg)

Career information
- High school: Murrieta Valley
- College: Boise State (2019–2022); Louisiana Tech (2023); Wake Forest (2024)
- NFL draft: 2025: undrafted

Career history
- BC Lions (2025)*; Orlando Storm (2026); Alpine Rams (2026–present)
- * Offseason or practice squad member only

William Hank Bachmeier (born July 14, 1999) is an American professional football quarterback for the Alpine Rams of the American Football League Europe. He played college football for the Boise State Broncos, Louisiana Tech Bulldogs, and Wake Forest Demon Deacons.

== Early life ==
Bachmeier was born to Michael and April Bachmeier, and was home-schooled until high school.

Bachmeier attended Murrieta Valley High School in Murrieta, California. As a four-year starter, he amassed 13,150 passing yards along with 2,190 rushing yards, totaling 15,340 all-purpose yards. He passed for 156 touchdowns and threw 30 interceptions while running for 32 more touchdowns, totaling 188 combined touchdowns. Bachmeier was rated by both 247Sports and Scout as a four-star recruit coming out of high school. He verbally committed to Boise State University in May 2018, officially signed in December and then enrolled in January 2019. He noted his relationships and offensive scheme, in addition to Boise State's ability to develop players and the city of Boise as reasons for choosing Boise State.

College recruiting (2019)
Name	Hometown	School	Height	Weight	Commit date
Hank Bachmeier; QB	Murrieta, California	Murrieta Valley High School	6 ft 3 in (1.91 m)	187 lb (85 kg)	May 9, 2018
Hank Bachmeier; QB	Recruit ratings: Scout: Rivals: 247Sports: (81)				
Overall recruit ranking: Rivals: 194 (overall), 6 (QB), 29 (CA) 247Sports: 235 (overall), 6 (QB), 30 (CA) ESPN: 265 (overall), 13 (QB), 28 (CA)
Note: In many cases, Scout, Rivals, 247Sports, On3, and ESPN may conflict in their listings of height and weight.; In these cases, the average was taken. ESPN grades are on a 100-point scale.; Sources: "Boise State Football Commitment List". Rivals.; "Boise State 2019 Football Commits". ESPN.; "2019 Team Ranking". Rivals.com.

== College career ==
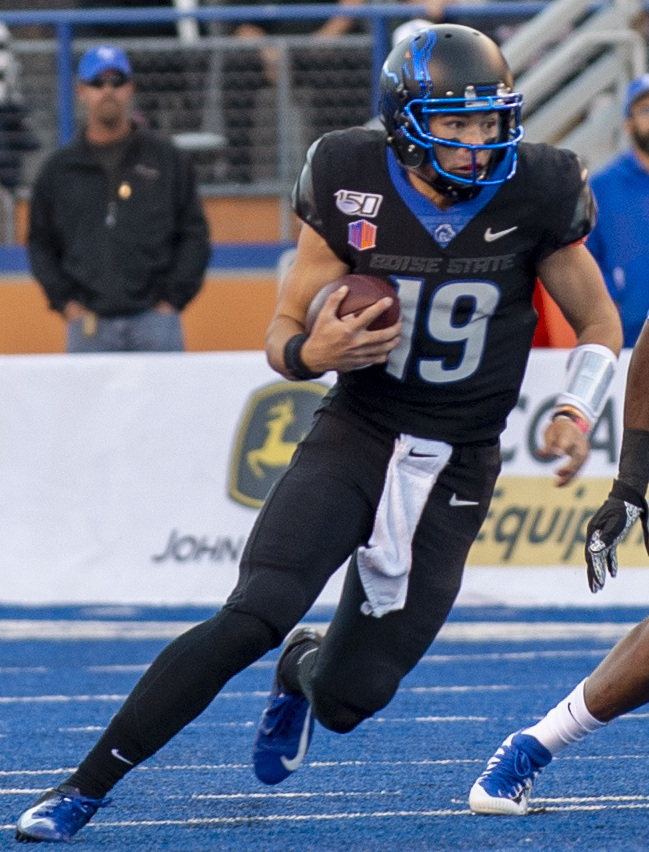
Bachmeier with Boise State in 2019

=== Boise State ===
As a true freshman, Bachmeier began the 2019 season as the starting quarterback, replacing four-year starter Brett Rypien, who had graduated following the 2018 season. He became the first true freshman to start a season opener for Boise State since the Broncos joined the FBS level. In his first game for the Broncos, Bachmeier completed 30 of 51 passes for 407 yards, one touchdown, and one interception in a 36–31 victory over Florida State. After Boise State opened the season 5–0 and was ranked No. 14 nationally, Bachmeier suffered a lower-back injury during the second quarter of a Week 6 game against Hawaii. He missed the following game against BYU, a 28–25 Boise State loss. Bachmeier returned in Week 8 against San Jose State and led the Broncos to a 52–42 victory, but sustained another injury during the game that sidelined him for the remainder of the regular season, including the Mountain West Championship Game against Hawaii, which Boise State won 31–10. He returned from injury to start against Washington in the 2019 Las Vegas Bowl, completing 15 of 26 passes for 119 yards and two interceptions before being replaced by Jaylon Henderson in a 38–7 loss. On the season, Bachmeier started all eight games in which he appeared, leading Boise State to a 7–1 record while completing 137 of 219 passes for 1,879 yards, nine touchdowns, and six interceptions. He also rushed for 69 yards and one touchdown.

He returned as Boise State's starting quarterback for the 2020 season. With the Broncos' season delayed until late October due to the COVID-19 pandemic, Bachmeier led Boise State to a 42–13 victory over Utah State, completing 20 of 28 passes for 268 yards and three touchdowns while adding a rushing touchdown. The victory earned the Broncos a No. 25 national ranking heading into their matchup against Air Force. However, Bachmeier did not travel for the game against Air Force and missed the following game against BYU for an unspecified reason. Boise State defeated Air Force but lost to BYU, causing the Broncos to fall out of the national rankings. He returned against Colorado State, completing 16 of 28 passes for 202 yards and a touchdown in a 52–21 victory. Bachmeier then led the Broncos to victories over Hawaii and Wyoming to finish the regular season 6–1 and earn a berth in the 2020 Mountain West Championship Game against San Jose State. Against the Spartans, Bachmeier completed 20 of 41 passes for 221 yards and rushed for a touchdown in a 34–20 loss. On December 20, Boise State announced that it had decided to forgo playing in a bowl game, effectively ending its season. On the season, Bachmeier appeared in and started five games, completing 96 of 156 passes for 1,150 yards, six touchdowns, and two interceptions while adding two rushing touchdowns.

Following a Week 5 loss to Nevada, in which Bachmeier completed 34 of 47 passes for 388 yards, four touchdowns, and one interception in a 41–31 defeat, Boise State fell to 2–3 to start the 2021 season. The Broncos then faced No. 10 BYU on the road, where Bachmeier led them to a 26–17 victory, completing 18 of 29 passes for 172 yards. A few weeks later, he led Boise State to a 40–14 victory over No. 23 Fresno State, completing 15 of 27 passes for 283 yards and a touchdown. On the season, Bachmeier played in and started all 12 games, leading Boise State to a 7–5 record and a berth in the Arizona Bowl. However, Boise State withdrew from the game due to COVID-19 issues within the program. Bachmeier completed 252 of 401 passes for 3,079 yards, 20 touchdowns, and eight interceptions.

Bachmeier began the 2022 season as Boise State's starting quarterback. In the season opener against Oregon State, he was replaced by Taylen Green after completing four of eight passes for 30 yards with two interceptions and a fumble in a 34–17 loss. He started the following week against New Mexico, completing 16 of 27 passes for 170 yards, three touchdowns, and one interception in a 31–14 victory. In Week 3 against UT Martin, he completed 18 of 25 passes for 204 yards and two touchdowns in a 30–7 win. In Week 4 against UTEP, Bachmeier completed 13 of 34 passes for 93 yards and a touchdown as the Broncos lost 27–10. On September 27, 2022, following the loss, offensive coordinator Tim Plough was fired and Bachmeier entered the NCAA transfer portal.

=== Louisiana Tech ===
On January 19, 2023, Bachmeier transferred to Louisiana Tech. He was named the starting quarterback ahead of the 2023 season opener. In his Louisiana Tech debut, he completed 34 of 44 passes for 333 yards, one touchdown, and one interception in a 22–17 victory over FIU. With Louisiana Tech holding a 2–1 record entering Week 4 against North Texas, Bachmeier sustained a shoulder injury that sidelined him for the next three games. In his first game back from the injury, he relieved starter Jack Turner in Week 9 against Middle Tennessee and nearly led a comeback, completing 16 of 24 passes for 178 yards and a touchdown. Bachmeier started the final four games of the season, but the Bulldogs lost all four. He finished the season having played in nine games with eight starts, completing 182 of 269 passes for 2,058 yards, 10 touchdowns, and five interceptions, while adding two rushing touchdowns. On November 28, 2023, Bachmeier entered the transfer portal for the second time.

=== Wake Forest ===
On December 10, 2023, Bachmeier transferred to Wake Forest. Bachmeier lost the starting quarterback competition to Michael Kern ahead of the season opener against North Carolina A&T. Following Wake Forest's slow start, Bachmeier relieved Kern in the first quarter and led Wake Forest to a 45–13 victory, completing 18 of 28 passes for 263 yards and three touchdowns. In his first start the following week against Virginia, he completed 27 of 42 passes for a season-high 403 yards and one touchdown in a 31–30 loss. On the season, Bachmeier played in all 12 games and started 11 as Wake Forest finished 4–8. He completed 224 of 357 passes for 2,593 yards, 16 touchdowns, and 10 interceptions, while rushing for 140 yards and one touchdown.

== Professional career ==
Pre-draft measurables
Height	Weight	Arm length	Hand span
6 ft 1 1/4 in (1.86 m)	208 lb (94 kg)	30 1/2 in (0.77 m)	9 1/8 in (0.23 m)
All values from Pro Day

Bachmeier went unselected in the 2025 NFL draft. In April 2025, Bachmeier was invited to San Francisco 49ers rookie minicamp, however he ultimately did not make the team.

=== BC Lions ===
On May 21, 2025, Bachmeier signed with the BC Lions of the Canadian Football League (CFL). He was released by the Lions on May 29.

=== Orlando Storm ===
On February 2, 2026, Bachmeier signed with the Orlando Storm of the United Football League (UFL). He began the 2026 season as the third-string quarterback behind Jack Plummer and Dorian Thompson-Robinson. Thompson-Robinson was traded midseason to Birmingham in exchange for Matt Corral, elevating Bachmeier to second-string. Despite moving up the depth chart, Bachmeier did not receive an opportunity to play, as Plummer remained the starter throughout the season and went on to win UFL Most Valuable Player honors. Bachmeier was active for all 10 regular-season games and the postseason game but did not appear in any of them.

=== Alpine Rams ===
Bachmeier signed with the Alpine Rams of the American Football League Europe during Week 12 of the league's inaugural 2026 season. At the time of his signing, the Rams were 1–8 in their first season as a franchise. Bachmeier made his debut against the Firenze Red Lions, completing 29 of 36 passes for 546 yards and five touchdowns in a victory. His 546 passing yards broke the league record for most passing yards in a game, surpassing the previous record of 438 yards set by Jakeb Sullivan. The following week against the Vienna Vikings, Bachmeier threw for 419 yards and three touchdowns with one interception in a loss. In the season finale against Paris Lights, he completed 38 of 58 passes for 368 yards and four touchdowns, including the game-winning touchdown pass in overtime. In three games with the Rams, Bachmeier completed 103 of 145 passes for 1,333 yards, 12 touchdowns, and one interception, while rushing for 100 yards on 16 carries. He averaged 444.3 passing yards per game, ranking eighth in the league in passing yards despite playing in only three games.

== Career statistics ==
=== AFLE ===
Year	Team	Games			Passing								Rushing			
Year	Team	GP	GS	Record	Cmp	Att	Pct	Yds	Y/A	TD	Int	Rtg	Att	Yds	Y/A	TD
2026	Alpine	3	3	2–1	103	145	71.0	1,333	9.2	12	1	124.3	16	100	6.3	0
Career		3	3	2–1	103	145	71.0	1,333	9.2	12	1	124.3	16	100	6.3	0

=== College ===
Year	Team	Games			Passing								Rushing			
Year	Team	GP	GS	Record	Cmp	Att	Pct	Yds	Y/A	TD	Int	Rtg	Att	Yds	Avg	TD
2019	Boise State	8	8	7−1	137	219	62.6	1,879	8.6	9	6	142.7	41	69	1.7	1
2020	Boise State	5	5	4−1	96	157	61.1	1,150	7.3	6	2	132.7	27	–6	–0.2	2
2021	Boise State	12	12	7−5	252	401	62.8	3,079	7.7	20	8	139.8	60	–20	–0.3	0
2022	Boise State	4	4	2−2	51	94	54.3	497	5.1	6	3	139.8	12	–26	–2.2	0
2023	Louisiana Tech	9	8	2−6	182	269	67.7	2,058	7.7	10	5	140.5	58	47	0.8	2
2024	Wake Forest	12	11	3−8	224	357	62.7	2,593	7.3	16	10	132.9	96	140	1.5	1
Career		50	48	25−23	942	1,496	63.0	11,256	7.5	67	34	136.4	294	204	0.7	6

== Personal life ==
Bachmeier is the oldest of five siblings. He has a sister and three brothers. His younger brothers, Tiger Bachmeier and Bear Bachmeier play for BYU. Bachmeier is of Thai descent through his mother.

Father, Michael Bachmeier played basketball at the United States Naval Academy before pursuing a career in military service, and he also influenced his children's athletic development through a disciplined upbringing focused on sports and resilience. His background in athletics and military training shaped the family's approach to discipline and teamwork.
