= Kevin Kaya =

Canadian gridiron football player (born 1995)

No. 20 – Alpine Rams
- Position: Wide receiver
- Roster status: Active

Personal information
- Born: 14 January 1995 (age 31); Nancy, France
- Listed height: 6 ft 3 in (1.91 m)
- Listed weight: 187 lb (85 kg)

Career information
- High school: Thetford Academy (Thetford, Vermont)
- University: Montreal (2016–2019)

Career history
- Montreal Alouettes (2021–2023); Frankfurt Galaxy (2024–2025); Alpine Rams (2026–present)

Awards and highlights
- Grey Cup champion (2023); Second-team All-Canadian (2019); RSEQ First-team All-Star (2019)

Career CFL statistics
- Games played: 8
- Receptions: 3
- Receiving yards: 30
- Stats at CFL.ca

Kevin Kaya (born 14 January 1995) is a French professional gridiron football wide receiver for the Alpine Rams of the American Football League Europe (AFLE). He played U Sports football for the Montreal Carabins.

== University career ==
Kaya played U Sports football for the Montreal Carabins from 2016 to 2019. He had 90 catches for 1,127 yards and two touchdowns to go with four carries for 10 yards. In 2019, Kaya was named to the RSEQ first-team All-Star and second-team All-Canadian.

== Professional career ==
=== Montreal Alouettes ===
On 8 June 2021, Kaya was signed by the Montreal Alouettes of the Canadian Football League (CFL). He played three seasons and had three receptions for 30 yards in eight games. Kaya was on the practice roster as the Alouettes defeated the Winnipeg Blue Bombers in the 110th Grey Cup game.

=== Frankfurt Galaxy ===
On 25 April 2024, Kaya signed with the Frankfurt Galaxy of the European League of Football (ELF). He played in 12 games and caught 50 passes for 758 yards and six touchdowns. On 12 November 2024, Kaya re-signed with the team. In 12 appearances, he had 58 receptions for 622 yards and four touchdowns.

=== Alpine Rams ===
On 16 February 2026, Kaya signed with the Alpine Rams of the American Football League Europe (AFLE). He played in 12 games and caught 77 passes for 1,051 yards and 13 touchdowns.
