= Shawn Bane Jr. =

American gridiron football player (born 1995)

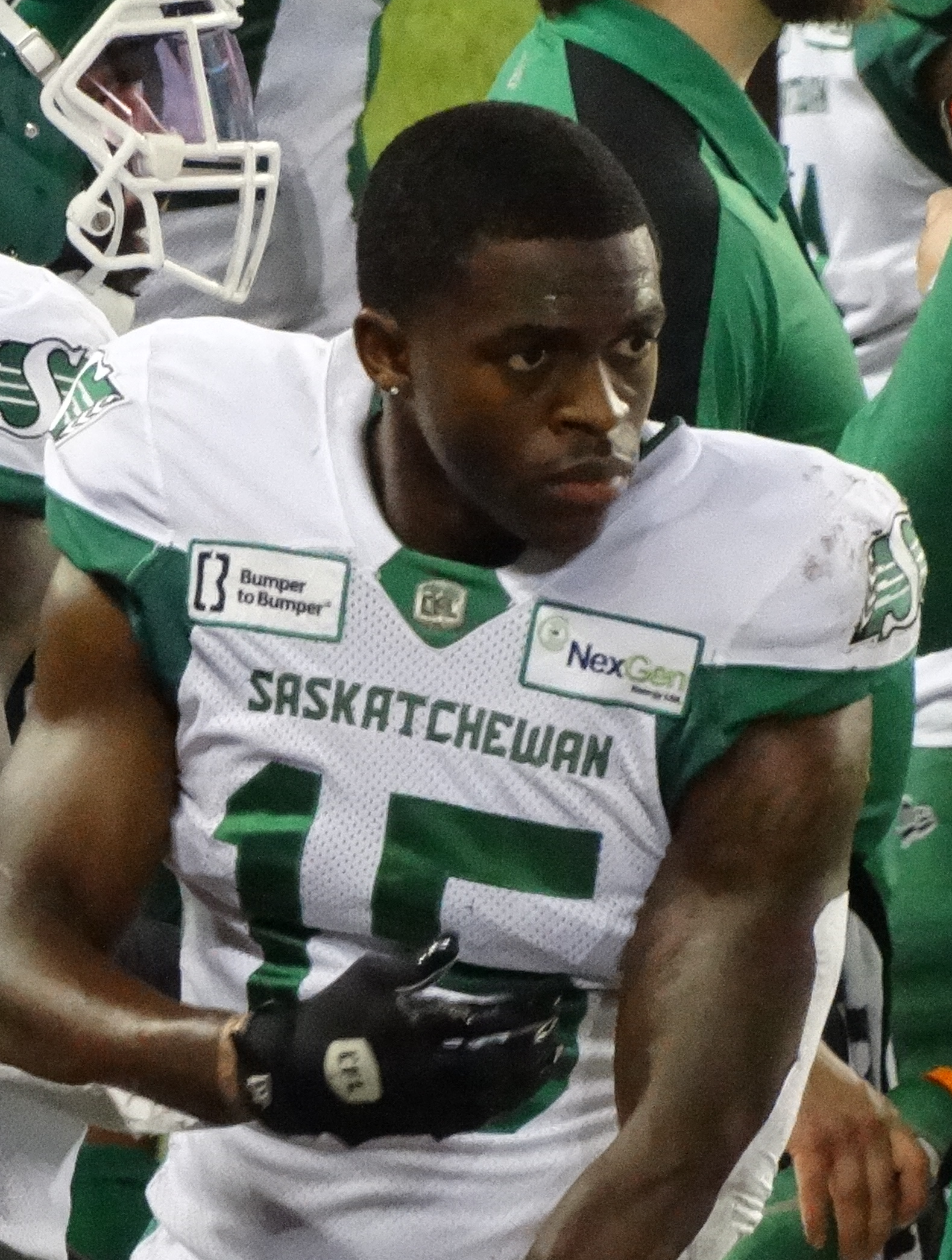
- Bane with the Saskatchewan Roughriders in 2024

Profile
- Position: Wide receiver

Personal information
- Born: June 9, 1995 (age 31); Sarasota, Florida, U.S.
- Listed height: 5 ft 9 in (1.75 m)
- Listed weight: 178 lb (81 kg)

Career information
- High school: Sarasota High
- College: Northwest Missouri State
- NFL draft: 2019: undrafted

Career history
- 2019: Atlanta Falcons*
- 2020–2022: Calgary Stampeders
- 2023–2025: Saskatchewan Roughriders
- 2026: Paris Lights
- 2026: Calgary Stampeders*
- * Offseason or practice squad member only

Awards and highlights
- Grey Cup champion (2025); CFL receptions leader (2023)
- Stats at CFL.ca

Shawn Bane Jr. (born June 9, 1995) is an American professional football wide receiver for the Calgary Stampeders of the Canadian Football League (CFL).

== College career ==
Bane played college football for the Northwest Missouri State Bearcats from 2015 to 2018. He played in 48 games where he had 212 catches for 3,363 yards and 31 touchdowns, 74 punt returns for 878 yards and two touchdowns, and 58 kickoff returns for 1,286 yards.

== Professional career ==
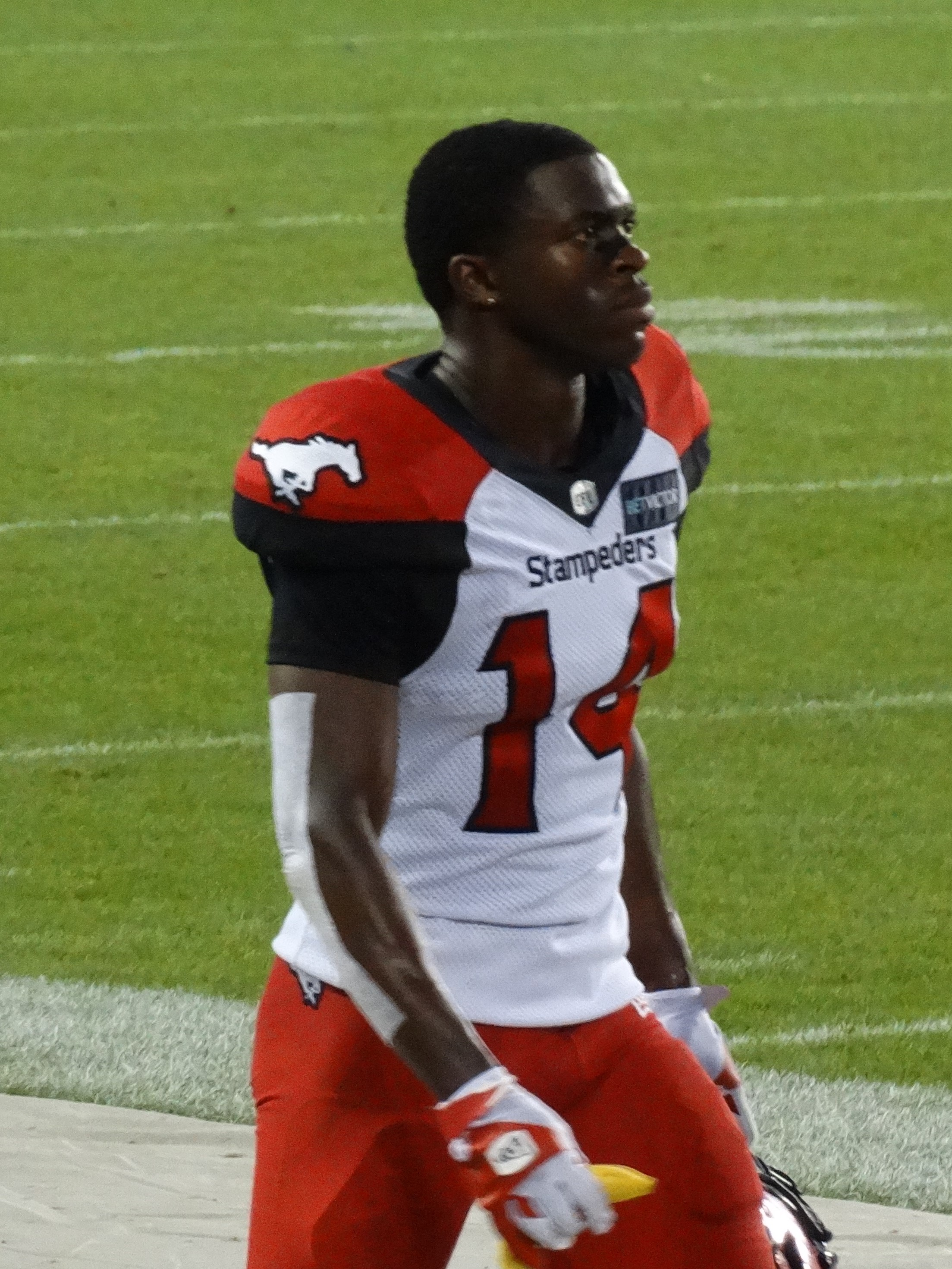
Bane with the Calgary Stampeders in 2022

=== Atlanta Falcons ===
After going undrafted in the 2019 NFL draft, Bane signed with the Atlanta Falcons on April 28, 2019. However, he was released during pre-season on August 25, 2019.

=== Calgary Stampeders ===
On February 7, 2020, It was announced that Bane had signed with the Calgary Stampeders. However, he did not play in 2020 due to the cancellation of the 2020 CFL season.

In 2021, Bane spent training camp with the Stampeders, but was released on July 29, 2021. However, he re-signed with the Stampeders on September 19, 2023. He then made his professional debut on October 2, 2021, against the Saskatchewan Roughriders, where he scored his first career touchdown on a 24-yard pass from Bo Levi Mitchell. Bane played in four games in his rookie year where he recorded three catches for 100 yards and one touchdown, 16 punt returns for 182 yards, seven kickoff returns for 138 yards, and three missed field goal returns for 55 yards.

Bane made the team's active roster to begin the 2022 season, but spent time on the practice roster throughout the season. In total, he played in nine regular season games, with seven starts, where he had 21 receptions for 288 yards and one touchdown, nine punt returns for 80 yards, and seven kickoff returns for 156 yards. He became a free agent upon the expiry of his contract on February 14, 2023.

=== Saskatchewan Roughriders ===
On February 14, 2023, Bane signed with the Saskatchewan Roughriders. That year, he had his first 1,000 yard receiving season in the CFL, gaining 1,104. He also led the CFL in receptions with 93.

On February 1, 2024, the Roughriders announced that Bane had signed a two-year contract extension, keeping him signed with the team through the 2025 season. He played in 14 games in 2024 where he recorded 49 receptions for 581 yards and five touchdowns before suffering a torn ACL injury that kept him out of the rest of the season. The injury carried through the 2025 season and he did not dress in a game until week 17 when he was used as a kick returner. After the team clinched first place in the West Division, Bane saw more repetitions at receivers and he recorded four catches for 28 yards in the last two games. He was a healthy scratch in the post-season including for the 112th Grey Cup championship victory over the Montreal Alouettes. As a pending free agent, Bane was released on January 28, 2026.

=== Paris Lights ===
On June 12, 2026, Bane signed with the Paris Lights of the American Football League Europe (AFLE).

=== Calgary Stampeders (second stint) ===
On September 27, 2026, Bane signed with the Calgary Stampeders roster navbox. He was released at the end of the season.

== Personal life ==
Bane's father, Shawn Bane Sr., died in January 2020 in a car accident in Florida. He was raised by his mother, Gretta Saunders, and he has six siblings.
