= Bill Shuey =

American football player and coach (born 1974)

Firenze Red Lions
- Title: Head coach, defensive coordinator

Personal information
- Born: October 5, 1974 (age 52); Bethlehem, Pennsylvania, U.S.

Career information
- High school: Liberty (Bethlehem, Pennsylvania)
- College: West Virginia University; Slippery Rock

Career history

Playing
- Pittsburgh Colts (1997–1998); Lehigh Valley Panthers (1999–2000)

Coaching
- Philadelphia Eagles (2000) Training camp assistant; Philadelphia Eagles (2001–2002) Training camp coordinator & assistant to head coach; Philadelphia Eagles (2003–2006) Offensive quality control coach; Philadelphia Eagles (2007) Defensive quality control coach; Philadelphia Eagles (2008–2010) Linebackers coach; West Chester (2012–2013) Linebackers coach; Widener (2014–2017) Assistant Head Coach & Defensive Coordinator; Chicago Bears (2018) Defensive quality control coach; Chicago Bears (2019–2020) Pass rush analyst & Assistant linebackers coach; Chicago Bears (2021) Outside linebackers coach; Jacksonville Jaguars (2022—2024) Outside linebackers coach; Miami Dolphins (2025) Defensive coaching consultant; Firenze Red Lions (2026–present) Head Coach & Defensive Coordinator

Operations
- Philadelphia Eagles (1999) Marketing intern

Bill Shuey (born October 5, 1974) is an American football coach and former defensive back who is the head coach and defensive coordinator for the Firenze Red Lions in the AFLE. He previously was the outside linebackers coach for the Jacksonville Jaguars of the National Football League (NFL). He has served as an assistant coach for the Miami Dolphins, Jacksonville Jaguars, Chicago Bears, Philadelphia Eagles, Widener Pride and West Chester Golden Rams.

Shuey played college football at Slippery Rock and spent four seasons in minor leagues with the Pittsburgh Colts and Lehigh Valley Panthers.

== Early life and education ==
Shuey was born on October 5, 1974, in Bethlehem, Pennsylvania, and attended Liberty High School. In high school, he was a wrestler, weighing 103 pounds as a junior and 130 pounds as a senior. Due to his size, Shuey was turned away from football while at Liberty. Following high school he attended West Virginia University for one year, before going to Slippery Rock University. He briefly played football at Slippery Rock, and shifted to semi-pro ball after graduating with a degree in sports management.

== Playing career ==
From 1996 to 1999, Shuey played semi-pro football. He spent 1996 with a Pittsburgh team before they folded. Afterwards he returned to Bethlehem but later joined the newly formed Pittsburgh Colts. He spent two seasons with them, and two with the Lehigh Valley Panthers.

== Coaching career ==
=== Philadelphia Eagles ===
Following the 1999 season with the Lehigh Valley Panthers, Shuey was given a position with the National Football League (NFL) Philadelphia Eagles as a marketing intern. He returned the following season as an assistant to the training camp coordinator. He would often leave Eagles practice to join the Lehigh Valley Panthers and played with them when the Eagles had preseason scrimmages. In 2001, the Eagles head coach Andy Reid called Shuey and offered him a job. At the time he was a teacher for Pennridge. He spent the 2001 to 2002 seasons as training camp coordinator and assistant to the head coach.

Shuey was promoted in 2003 to quality control coach and offensive assistant, where his duties were to compile the playbook, present play diagrams, analyze videotape, and help coach running back reps. His offensive coordinator Brad Childress described him as someone who, "caught everybody's attention with his aptitude for football," and, "an extremely hard worker and a very quick study. Once you tell him something, he gets it." He spent five years in the position, and helped them make the playoffs in three of those years, including one trip to the Super Bowl in 2004. He became a position coach in 2008, and served as their linebackers coach until 2010. In 2009, he was coach of the Pro Bowl linebackers. He was one of three coaches fired following the 2010 season.

=== West Chester Golden Rams ===
After taking a year off in 2011, he was hired by the West Chester Golden Rams in 2012. He spent two seasons as their linebackers coach, helping linebacker Ronell Williams earn defensive player of the year in 2013.

=== Widener Pride ===
From 2014 to 2017, he worked with the Widener Pride college football team. He served six different positions there, including assistant head coach, defensive coordinator, co-special teams coordinator, secondary coach, recruiting coordinator, and weight room supervisor.

=== Chicago Bears ===
He was given a position with the Chicago Bears in 2018, as their defensive quality control coach. He worked with the defensive line and inside linebacker positions. He was promoted in 2019 to pass rush analyst and assistant linebackers coach. In 2021, he was promoted again to outside linebackers coach. The Bears outside linebackers include Khalil Mack, a six-time Pro Bowler. During the 2021 season, Shuey coached Robert Quinn to set the Bears franchise single season sack record with 18.5 sacks. Shuey was not retained following the firing of head coach Matt Nagy and the subsequent hiring of Matt Eberflus after the conclusion of the 2021 season.

=== Jacksonville Jaguars ===
On February 17, 2022, Shuey was hired by the Jacksonville Jaguars as their outside linebackers coach under head coach Doug Pederson. During the 2023 season, Shuey coached Josh Hines-Allen to set the Jaguars franchise single season sack record at 17.5 sacks. In that same season, the starting Outside Linebacker duo of Travon Walker and Josh Hines-Allen had a combined 27.5 sacks, which led the NFL.

=== Miami Dolphins ===
During the 2025 season, Shuey was hired by the Miami Dolphins as a Defensive Coaching Consultant to assist with the Outside Linebackers.
