= Ayo Oyelola =

English gridiron football player (born 1998)

Profile
- Position: Safety

Personal information
- Born: 19 October 1998 (age 28); Dagenham, East London
- Listed height: 6 ft 0 in (1.83 m)
- Listed weight: 213 lb (97 kg)

Career information
- High school: King Edward VI Grammar School
- College: University of Nottingham
- CFL draft: 2021G: 3rd round, 22nd overall pick

Career history
- Winnipeg Blue Bombers (2021); Jacksonville Jaguars (2022–2023)*; Pittsburgh Steelers (2024)*; Winnipeg Blue Bombers (2025)*; Alpine Rams (2026); Winnipeg Blue Bombers (2026)*
- * Offseason or practice squad member only

Career CFL statistics
- Games played: 1
- Stats at CFL.ca
- Stats at Pro Football Reference

Ayo Oyelola (born 19 October 1998) is an English professional gridiron football safety.

== Early life ==
From East London, Oyelola was a soccer player in his youth, and featured in the academy at teams such as Chelsea, Southend United, Dagenham and Redbridge and Ebbsfleet. He started playing American football at the University of Nottingham, where he graduated with a law degree in 2020.

== Professional career ==
=== Winnipeg Blue Bombers (first stint) ===
Oyelola started out as a linebacker before transitioning to safety. He was drafted 22nd in the 2021 CFL global draft by Winnipeg Blue Bombers. Oyelola made his debut for the Winnipeg Blue Bombers in the Canadian Football League on 20 November 2021 against the Calgary Stampeders.

=== Jacksonville Jaguars ===
In December 2020, it was announced that Oyelola had been one of eleven athletes from around to world to selected to participate in the NFL International Player Pathway (IPP). He did not secure a contract with an NFL team and decided to play in the CFL. In January 2022 it was announced that he was again selected to be a part of the NFL IPP, this time involving 13 athletes from around the world. He was signed by the Jacksonville Jaguars later that year. He was waived by the Jaguars on 30 August 2022. Oyelola re-signed with Jacksonville's practice squad the next day and spent the remainder of the season on the practice squad.

On 23 January 2023, he signed a reserve/futures contract with the Jaguars, but was waived again on 29 August, the conclusion of training camp. He later re-signed to the team's practice squad, where he spent the remainder of the season. On 9 January 2024, Oyelola signed a reserve/futures contract with the Jaguars. He was waived on 15 April.

=== Pittsburgh Steelers ===
On 2 September 2024, Oyelola was signed to a one year contract by the Pittsburgh Steelers, and joined their practice squad. He was released on 11 January 2025.

=== Winnipeg Blue Bombers (second stint) ===
Oyelola signed with the Blue Bombers' practice roster on 3 September 2025. He was released on 8 September 2025.

=== Alpine Rams ===
On 27 March 2026, Oyelola signed with the Alpine Rams of the American Football League Europe.

=== Winnipeg Blue Bombers (third stint) ===
Oyelola was signed to the Blue Bombers' practice roster again on 8 June 2026. He was released on August 25.
