= Matthew McKay (American football) =

American football player (born 1999)

Profile
- Position: Quarterback

Personal information
- Born: October 21, 1999 (age 27); Raleigh, North Carolina, U.S.
- Listed height: 6 ft 4 in (1.93 m)
- Listed weight: 212 lb (96 kg)

Career information
- High school: Wakefield (Raleigh)
- College: NC State (2017–2019); Montana State (2020–2021); Elon (2022)
- NFL draft: 2023: undrafted

Career history
- San Antonio Brahmas (2024)*; Frankfurt Galaxy (2024–2025); Firenze Red Lions (2026)
- * Offseason or practice squad member only

Matthew Christopher McKay (born October 21, 1999) is an American football quarterback for the Frankfurt Galaxy of the European League of Football (ELF). He played college football for the NC State Wolfpack, Montana State Bobcats, and Elon Phoenix.

== Early life and college career ==
McKay was born on October 21, 1999, in Raleigh, North Carolina. He played high school football for Wakefield High School in Raleigh. With Wakefield he threw for 5,932 yards and 58 touchdowns along with 2,386 rushing yards and 39 rushing touchdowns. He was a three-time first team all-league selection from his sophomore to senior year. Coming out of high school he was ranked the third-best quarterback in North Carolina and the 41st-best player in the whole state according to Rivals.com. On February 27, 2016, he committed to play college football for NC State.

College recruiting
Name	Hometown	School	Height	Weight	Commit date
Matthew McKay; QB	Raleigh, North Carolina	Wakefield High School	6 ft 4 in (1.93 m)	180 lb (82 kg)	Feb 27, 2016
Matthew McKay; QB	Recruit ratings: Scout: Rivals: 247Sports: ESPN:				
Overall recruit ranking: 247Sports: 694
Note: In many cases, Scout, Rivals, 247Sports, On3, and ESPN may conflict in their listings of height and weight.; In these cases, the average was taken. ESPN grades are on a 100-point scale.; Sources: "2018 Team Ranking". Rivals.com.

=== NC State ===
In 2017, McKay was redshirted. He was named the team's Offensive Scout Team Player of the Year.

In 2018, McKay saw playing time in five games and finished the season completing seven of his eight pass attempts. He threw for the most yards against Louisville as he completed five of his six attempts for 38 yards. He scored his first-career touchdown against Georgia State.

In 2019, McKay played in six games and started five of them. He threw for a then-career-high 910 yards on the season. He completed 86 of his 150 passes along with three passing touchdowns. Against East Carolina, he threw for a career-high 308 passing yards along with 63 rushing yards on 25 carries. In the game he also scored four total touchdowns. Following the season, he announced he would transfer from the school.

=== Montana State ===
In December 2019, McKay transferred to FCS school Montana State. The 2020 season was postponed to the spring due to COVID-19 and Montana State chose to opt out of the spring season.

In 2021, McKay started all 11 games and he went 9–2 as a starter. He finished the season going 153-of-248 for 2,037 passing yards along with 17 touchdowns and only three interceptions. In a near-upset against Wyoming he completed 19 of his 29 pass attempts for 202 yards and two touchdowns. Prior to the team's playoff game against UT Martin, McKay announced he would transfer for a second time after he was benched for freshman Tommy Mellott.

=== Elon ===
In 2022, McKay transferred to Elon. He started all 12 games for the Phoenix. He finished the season completing 197 of his 323 passes for a career-high 21 touchdowns and four interceptions. On the ground he also added 458 yards and three touchdowns. Against Vanderbilt he had a career-high 333 passing yards as he finished the game going nineteen-of-32 for two passing touchdowns and an additional two rushing touchdowns.

=== Statistics ===
Year	Team	Games		Passing								Rushing			
Year	Team	GP	Record	Comp	Att	Pct	Yards	Avg	TD	Int	Rate	Att	Yards	Avg	TD
2017	NC State	DNP													
2018	NC State	5	0–0	7	8	87.5	87	10.9	0	0	178.9	13	36	2.8	1
2019	NC State	6	3–2	86	150	57.3	910	6.1	3	1	113.6	25	63	2.5	4
2020–21	Montana State	DNP													
2021	Montana State	11	9–2	153	246	62.2	2,021	8.2	17	3	151.6	78	316	4.1	2
2022	Elon	12	8–4	196	321	61.1	2,690	8.4	21	4	150.5	120	458	3.8	3
Career		34	20−8	442	725	61.0	5,708	7.9	41	8	143.6	236	873	3.7	10

== Professional career ==
Pre-draft measurables
Height	Weight	Arm length	Hand span	40-yard dash	10-yard split	20-yard split	20-yard shuttle	Three-cone drill	Vertical jump	Broad jump
6 ft 3 in (1.91 m)	217 lb (98 kg)	32 1/2 in (0.83 m)	9 3/8 in (0.24 m)	4.90 s	1.84 s	2.76 s	4.72 s	7.26 s	29 1/2 in (0.75 m)	9 ft 6 in (2.90 m)
All values from NC States' Pro Day

=== San Antonio Brahmas ===
After going undrafted in the 2023 NFL draft, McKay signed a letter of intent with the San Antonio Brahmas of the XFL on October 18, 2023. He was released on January 31, 2024.

=== Frankfurt Galaxy (ELF/EFA) ===
On July 8, 2024, McKay was signed by the Frankfurt Galaxy of the European League of Football (ELF).

=== Firenze Red Lions (AFLE) ===
On March 23rd, 2026, McKay was signed by the Firenze Red Lions of the American Football League Europe (AFLE). On July 6th, 2026, McKay was released.

== Personal life ==
McKay's younger brother, Timothy, is an offensive lineman for NC State.
