= Cherry Red Records Stadium =

Cherry Red Records Stadium may refer to:

- Plough Lane Stadium (2021–), current stadium of AFC Wimbledon
- Kingsmeadow Stadium (2002–20), during AFC Wimbledon's ownership of the stadium
