= Timothy McKay (American football) =

American football player (born 2002)

Profile
- Position: Guard

Personal information
- Born: January 15, 2002 (age 24); Long Island, New York, U.S.
- Listed height: 6 ft 4 in (1.93 m)
- Listed weight: 312 lb (142 kg)

Career information
- High school: Wakefield (Raleigh, North Carolina)
- College: NC State (2019–2024)
- NFL draft: 2025: undrafted

Career history
- Washington Commanders (2025)*; Jacksonville Jaguars (2026)*
- * Offseason or practice squad member only
- Stats at Pro Football Reference

Timothy McKay (born January 15, 2002) is an American professional football guard. He played college football for the NC State Wolfpack. McKay signed with the Washington Commanders as an undrafted free agent in 2025.

== Early life ==
McKay was born on January 15, 2002, in Long Island, New York. He attended Wakefield High School. where he was rated a four-star recruit. McKay committed to play college football for the NC State Wolfpack over Duke.

== College career ==
During his six-year career at NC State from 2019 through 2024, he appeared in 55 games, with 34 starts, as he became a full-time starter in 2022, while primarily playing offensive guard, and tackle. After the conclusion of the 2024 season, he declared for the 2025 NFL draft, while also accepting an invite to participate in the 2025 East-West Shrine Bowl.

== Professional career ==
Pre-draft measurables
Height	Weight	Arm length	Hand span	Wingspan	Vertical jump
6 ft 3 7/8 in (1.93 m)	311 lb (141 kg)	34 1/8 in (0.87 m)	10 1/8 in (0.26 m)	6 ft 8 in (2.03 m)	30.5 in (0.77 m)
All values from Pro Day

=== Washington Commanders ===
McKay signed with the Washington Commanders as an undrafted free agent on April 26, 2025. He was waived by the Commanders as a part of final roster cuts on August 26, and was re–signed to the team's practice squad the following day.

On January 5, 2026, McKay signed a reserve/futures contract with the Commanders. He was released by Washington on August 8.

=== Jacksonville Jaguars ===
McKay was signed by the Jacksonville Jaguars on August 17, 2026. On August 30, he was waived by Jacksonville as a part of final roster cuts.

== Personal life ==
McKay is the younger brother of quarterback Matthew McKay.
