= London Warriors =

American football team based in the United Kingdom

Logo

General information
- Founded: 2007
- Headquartered: London, United Kingdom
- Colors: Black, metallic gold, grey, white

Personnel
- General manager: Marvin Allen
- Head coach: Tony Allen

Team history
- London Cobras (2007–2009); London Warriors (2009–present)

Home fields
- Frant Road (2007–2025); Plough Lane (2026); Trailfinders Sports Ground (2026–Present)

League / conference affiliations
- BAFA National Leagues (2007-2025): Division Two (2008); Division One (2009); Premiership South (2010–2025); American Football League Europe (2026–present): North/West Conference (2026–present)

Championships
- League championships: 7 Britbowl: 2013, 2014, 2015, 2016, 2018, 2019, 2024
- Division championships: 12: Division Two: 2008; Division One: 2009; Premiership South: 2012, 2013, 2014, 2015, 2016, 2018, 2019, 2022, 2023, 2024

Playoff appearances (14)
- BAFA: 2008, 2009, 2012, 2013, 2014, 2015, 2016, 2017, 2018, 2019, 2022, 2023, 2024; AFLE: 2026

The London Warriors, previously known as the London Cobras, are an American football club based in London, England. They compete in the American Football League Europe.

== History ==
=== Early History and British Leagues ===
The London Warriors were formed in 2007 as a senior team of the successful London Warriors youth team, which had won the British Youth American Football Association for the previous two years running. After being accepted by the British American Football League as affiliate members, they arranged to play the two friendly matches required under BAFL regulations. In October 2007, the Warriors played home and away games against two teams from the British Universities American Football League—the first game was played at home to the Royal Holloway Vikings and ended in a 54–0 victory. One week later, they travelled to play the Loughborough Aces and won again, this time 42–7.

After completing their obligations, the BAFL formally accepted the Warriors (the Cobras) application to join the league in December 2007, allowing them to compete as full members for the 2008 season.

=== AFLE ===
In 2026, the Warriors left the BAFL to pursue an opportunity in the new American Football League Europe. It was announced in May 2026 that the Warriors would be playing their first few matches at Cherry Red Records Stadium, opening up their season against the Panthers Wrocław. Following an 0-3 start, the Warriors went on to secure a play-off spot in the inaugural AFLE season which was confirmed after a home victory over the Paris Lights in Week 12. The Warriors were eliminated by the Vienna Vikings in the semifinals 71-34.

=== Season-by-season ===
Name	Coach	Regular season					Postseason				Result	Ø Attendance
Name	Coach	GP	Won	Lost	Win %	Finish	GP	Won	Lost	Win %	Result	Ø Attendance
2026	Tony Allen	12	6	6	.500	2nd (North/West)	1	0	1	0.000	Lost Semifinal to Vienna	
Total		12	6	6	0.500	-	1	0	1	0.000	-	

== Stadium ==
For most of their history, the London Warriors played at Frant Road, home of Streatham-Croydon RFC in the Thornton Heath district of South London.

Following their move to AFLE, the Warriors announced Cherry Red Records Stadium as their new home venue.

== Colors and logos ==
When the London Warriors were announced as one of the AFLE's founding members, a new logo was unveiled. The team's colors are black, metallic gold, grey, and white.

Old Logo for the London Warriors (2009–2026)

== See also ==
- London Guard, a professional American football team playing in the European Football Alliance
