= Bernhard Seikovits =

Austrian gridiron football player (born 1997)

Profile
- Position: Tight end

Personal information
- Born: 24 July 1997 (age 29); Vienna, Austria
- Listed height: 6 ft 5 in (1.96 m)
- Listed weight: 262 lb (119 kg)

Career history
- Vienna Vikings (2017–2020); Arizona Cardinals (2021–2024)*
- * Offseason or practice squad member only
- Stats at Pro Football Reference

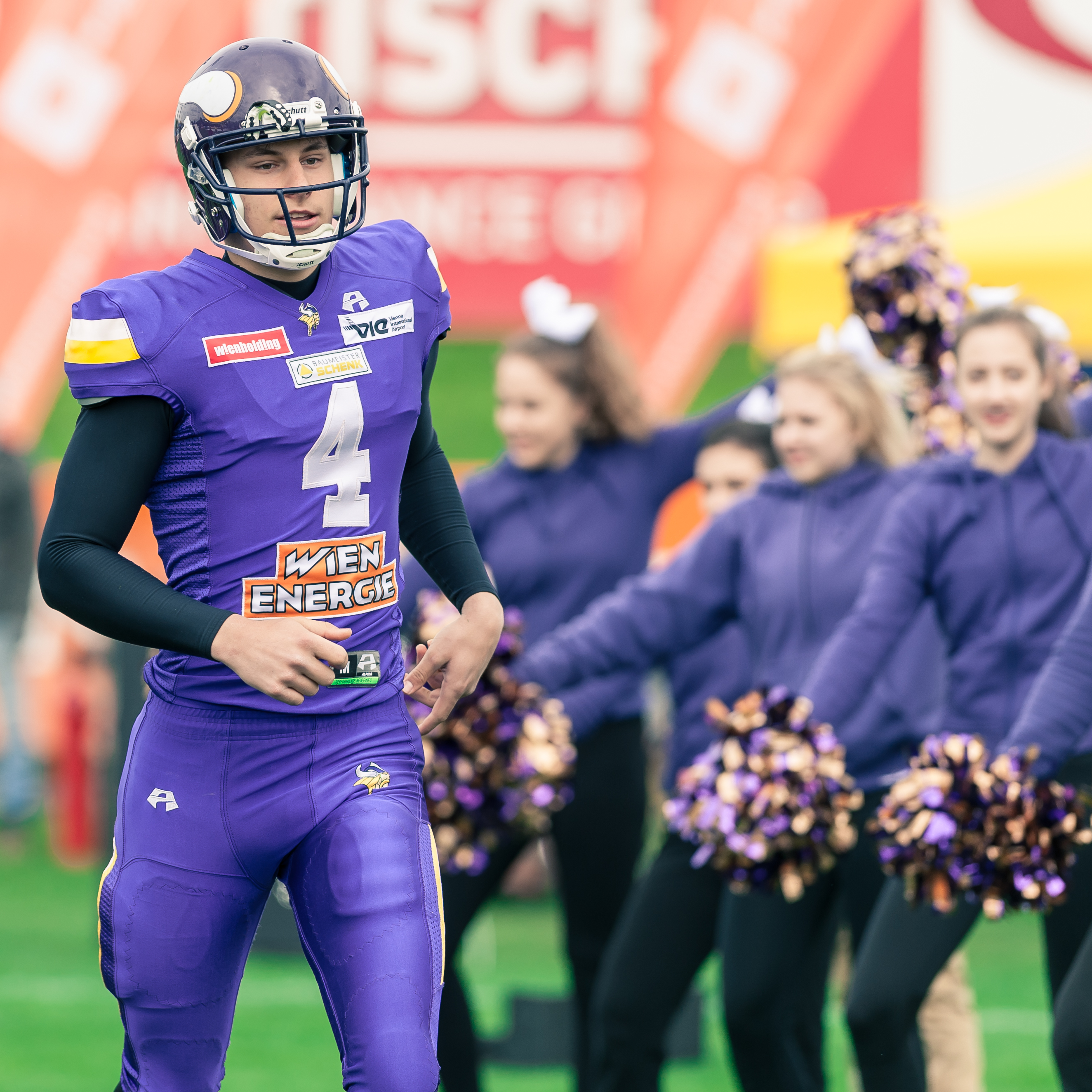
Bernhard Seikovits, 2016

Bernhard "Seiko" Seikovits (born 24 July 1997) is an Austrian professional football tight end. He played for the Vienna Vikings of the Austrian Football League from 2017 until joining the Cardinals via the NFL's International Player Pathway Program in 2021.

== Career ==
=== Vienna Vikings ===
Seikovits had played for the Vienna Vikings junior teams since age 10. He then joined the Vikings senior team in the Austrian Football League and became one of the top receivers in the league. He was also the captain of the Austria national American football team and won two European Championships as a quarterback for the country's Under-19 team.

=== Arizona Cardinals ===
Seikovits was assigned to the Arizona Cardinals of the National Football League (NFL) as a part of the league's International Player Pathway Program. He joined the team in training camp, and can be added to the practice squad afterward thanks to an exemption that would allow the Cardinals to carry an extra player. He was waived on 31 August 2021 and re-signed to the practice squad the next day. He signed a reserve/future contract with the Cardinals on 19 January 2022.

Seikovits saw improvement in the 2022 pre-season, catching 4 passes for 26 yards. On 30 August 2022, Seikovits was waived by the Cardinals and signed to the practice squad the next day. He signed a reserve/future contract on 11 January 2023.

On 29 August 2023, Seikovits was released by the Cardinals and re-signed to the practice squad. He signed a reserve/future contract on 8 January 2024.

Seikovits was waived by the Cardinals on 27 August 2024, and re-signed to the practice squad. He signed a reserve/future contract on January 6, 2025.

On April 29, 2025, Seikovits was released by the Cardinals.
