= Ben Holmes (gridiron football) =

American gridiron football player (born 1997)

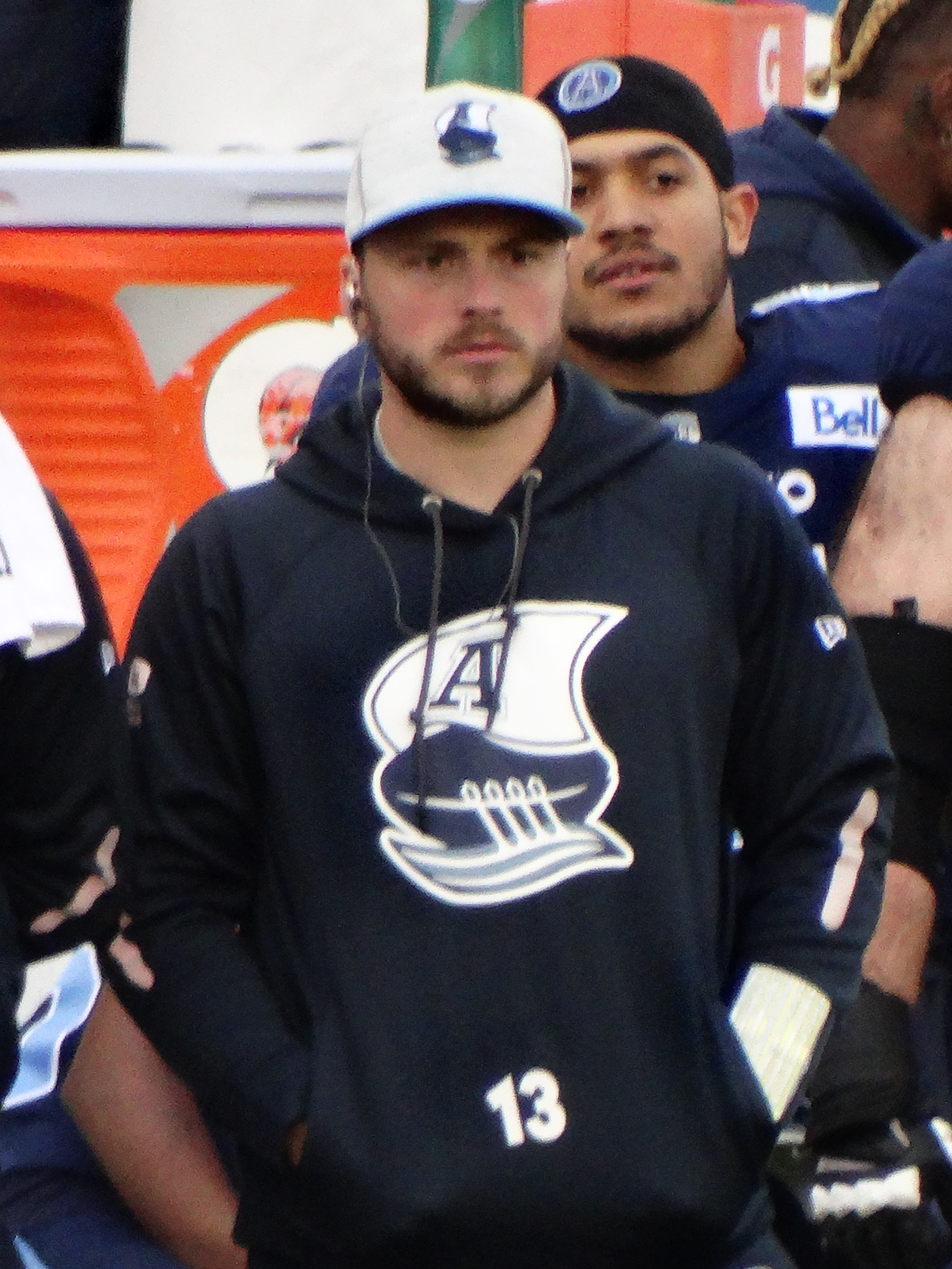
- Holmes with the Toronto Argonauts in 2022

No. 3 – Vienna Vikings
- Position: Quarterback
- Roster status: Active

Personal information
- Born: October 15, 1994 (age 32); Orchard Park, New York, U.S.
- Listed height: 6 ft 0 in (1.83 m)
- Listed weight: 200 lb (91 kg)

Career information
- High school: Orchard Park
- College: Tarleton State
- NFL draft: 2020: undrafted

Career history
- Arizona Rattlers (2021–2022); New Jersey Generals (2022)*; Montreal Alouettes (2022)*; Edmonton Elks (2022); Toronto Argonauts (2022); Vienna Vikings (2024–present)
- * Offseason or practice squad member only

Awards and highlights
- Grey Cup champion (2022)
- Stats at CFL.ca

Ben Holmes (born October 15, 1994) is an American professional football quarterback for the Vienna Vikings of the European League of Football (ELF). He played college football at Nassau Community College and Tarleton State. He played for the Toronto Argonauts of the Canadian Football League (CFL) in 2022. He will play for the Vienna Vikings in the European League of Football in the 2024 season.

== Early life ==
Holmes attended Orchard Park High School, where he initially played wide receiver and won the state title in 2011. He then switched to quarterback and took the Quakers back to the state final. Holmes attended prep school in Texas.

== College career ==
Holmes first enrolled at Nassau Community College. He then transferred and played for the Tarleton State Texans where he led the team to a 23–2 record in two seasons in Division II. As a senior, Holmes threw for 34 touchdowns and three interceptions. He made 196 completions for 3,338 yards and rushed for 59 yards on 32 attempts with a touchdown.

== Professional career ==
Holmes played for the Arizona Rattlers in the Indoor Football League and for the Sea Lions in the Spring League. He was drafted fourth overall in the 2022 USFL draft by the New Jersey Generals, but was released on April 1, 2022, due to a toe injury and replaced by Luis Perez.

After spending time with the Montreal Alouettes and Edmonton Elks, Holmes signed with the Toronto Argonauts on August 3, 2022. He dressed in one game in 2022 and was part of the final cuts following training camp of the following season on June 2, 2023.

On November 21, 2023, Holmes signed with the Vienna Vikings. In the 2024 season of the European League of Football Holmes played in 10 games, completing 187 of 301 pass attempts, throwing 34 touchdown passes with only 5 interceptions.
