= Wakefield High School (Raleigh, North Carolina) =

Public high school in Raleigh, North Carolina

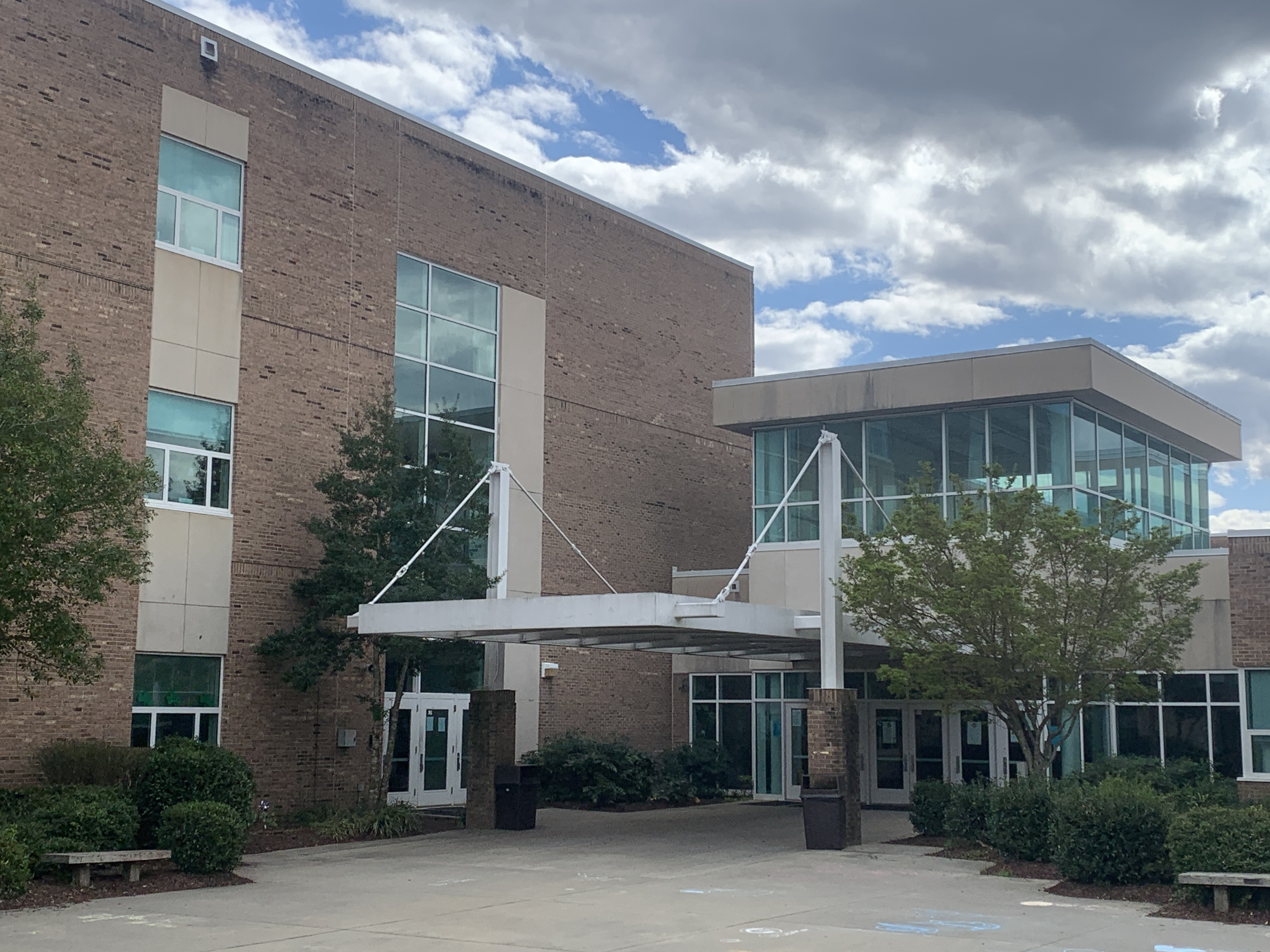

Location
- 2200 Wakefield Pines Dr; Raleigh, North Carolina 27614; United States; 35°56′51″N 78°34′15″W

Information
- Type: Public high school
- Motto: It's all about the "W"
- Established: 2000 (26 years ago)
- School district: Wake County Public School System
- NCES District ID: 3704720
- CEEB code: 343244
- NCES School ID: 370472002560
- Principal: Malik Bazzell
- Teaching staff: 108.74 (on an FTE basis)
- Grades: 9–12
- Gender: Coeducational
- Enrollment: 2,105 (2023–2024)
- Student to teacher ratio: 19.36
- Campus size: 110 acres (45 ha)
- Campus type: Suburban
- Colors: Maroon, Black, and Silver
- Athletics: NCHSAA 8A
- Athletics conference: CAP 8A
- Mascot: Wolverines
- Accreditation: Southern Association of Colleges and Schools
- Newspaper: The Howler
- Website: Wakefield High School

Wakefield High School is a Wake County public high school located in Raleigh, North Carolina. The school is adjacent to Wakefield Elementary and Wakefield Middle schools.

== History ==
Wakefield High School's building was completed and opened in 1999. For the 1999–2000 school year, the building was occupied by students from Sanderson High School, while their school was under renovation. For that school year, the name of the school was Sanderson High School at Wakefield.

In 2000, Wakefield students inhabited the building for the first time, with 2000–2001 being the first official school year of Wakefield High.

== Schedule ==
The school year at Wakefield High School starts in late August and ends in early June. The class schedule, commonly referred to as "block scheduling", has four different classes each semester, each block being approximately ninety minutes long. This completes a course in one semester instead of one year and provides four new classes in the second semester. Students take exams in mid-January and again in early June.

In the 2009–2010 school year, a different type of lunch block was created called "SMART" lunch. Instead of multiple 30-minute lunch blocks, a single 55-minute block between blocks 3 and 4 was established where all students and staff would eat lunch together, unless the student had an off-campus pass they wished to use. Many school clubs were held during the lunch block, along with teacher help sessions. This "SMART" lunch was removed about 5 years later in October 2016 by then principal Malik Bazzell, who said that "only nine percent of the students actually utilized SMART lunch on a daily basis and 91 percent were out and about doing whatever." This decision by the principal was opposed by many of the students and some teachers, especially those who utilized the time. While there was a small overlap at the beginning of the 2016–2017 school year, a new 35-minute block called "Pride Time" was created primarily to replace SMART lunch. "Pride Time" was similar in many ways to SMART lunch, with the main difference being a shorter block time and comparatively less freedom over movement. Students who had a grade point average lower than 75 were required to go to receive extra help during Pride Time in any classes they may have been struggling in. Pride Time would also later be removed for various reasons in the 2021–2022 school year. A similar system called "PACK Time" would be implemented in the 2023–2024 school year, where two 30-minute blocks are assigned, with one block being assigned to lunch, and the other being an assignable activity, such as remediation or another activity of the student's choosing.

As of the 2023–2024 school year, Wakefield High School offers the following 18 Advanced Placement (AP) courses for: Biology, Calculus AB, Calculus BC, Chemistry, Computer Science A, Computer Science Principles, English Language and Composition, English Literature and Composition, Environmental Science, Government and Politics, Human Geography, Physics I, Psychology, Statistics, Studio Art-Drawing, Studio Art-2D, Studio Arts-3D, and United States History.

== Athletics ==
Wakefield is a member of the North Carolina High School Athletic Association (NCHSAA) and are classified as an 8A school. The school is a part of the CAP 8A Conference. Wakefield's biggest rivalry in sports is with the cross-town Wake Forest Cougars, Heritage Huskies, and Millbrook Wildcats.

As of the 2023–2024 school year, Wakefield High School offers the following 22 athletic programs for the fall, winter, and spring seasons:

Fall Sports: Cheer, Cross Country, Football, Women's Golf, Men's Soccer, Women's Tennis, and Volleyball

Winter Sports: Men's Basketball, Women's Basketball, Men's Indoor Track, Women's Indoor Track, Swimming & Diving, Men's Swimming & Diving, Women's Swimming & Diving, Wrestling, Men's Wrestling, and Women's Wrestling

Spring Sports: Baseball, Women's Basketball, Men's Golf, Men's Lacrosse, Women's Lacrosse, Women's Soccer, Softball, Men's Tennis, Men's Outdoor Track, and Women's Outdoor Track

== Clubs and organizations ==
The school's student newspaper, The Howler, includes open student forums, opinion articles, students' life articles, and a "Fri-Yay" blog among other media. The mission of The Howler is to provide unbiased and accurate news coverage to the students and faculty at Wakefield and to the surrounding community. The Howler won the North Carolina Scholastic Media Association's award for excellence in journalism in 2016, 2019, 2021, and 2022.

=== Wakefield Theatre Company ===
Wakefield Theatre Company is school's theater program, which teaches students the performing arts by putting on plays and hosting drama club and International Thespian Society events for the school. In addition to plays, some events previously organized include a murder mystery dinner, a haunted house, and a week-long drama camp in the summer. The program has often worked with the middle and elementary schools on productions, and performs between 4–8 plays each school year on average.

Wakefield Theatre Company was founded around the same time the school was opened, staging its first performance in 2000. Since its inception it was headed by Paul Orsett, head of the school's theater arts department, until his retirement in June 2024. After his retirement, the middle school's theater teacher Catherine Delaney took over, and as of the 2025–2026 school year remains as head of the department.

== Statistics ==
- Wakefield High School has 2,072 students; composed of 1,069 males and 1,003 females.
- As for student demographics; 45% of the students are White, 28% are Black, 18% are Hispanic, 5% are Asian, 3% are two or more races, <1% are American Indian/ Alaskan Native, and <1% are Native Hawaiian/ Pacific Islander. 35% of students are eligible to receive free or reduced-price lunches.
- There are 587 Freshmen, 562 Sophomores, 498 Juniors, and 425 Seniors that are registered as students.
- The student teacher ratio is approximately 19:1.

== Notable alumni ==
- Tim Adleman, former MLB pitcher
- Veronica Fraley, American discus thrower, member of United States team at 2024 Summer Olympics
- T. J. Graham, NFL wide receiver
- Justin Hughes, former professional soccer player
- Shawnti Jackson, American sprinter
- Timothy McKay, NFL offensive guard for the Washington Commanders
- Doug Polk, professional poker player
- Darius Johnson-Odom, NBA player
- Tye Smith, NFL cornerback
