= Vienna Vikings =

Professional American football team in Austria

Logo

General information
- Founded: 1983; 43 years ago
- Stadium: Generali Arena (AFLE); Football-Zentrum Ravelin (AFL)
- Headquartered: Vienna, Austria
- Colors: Purple, gold, white
- Mascot: Loki (White Wolf)
- Website: viennavikings.com

Personnel
- Head coach: Jordan Neuman

League / conference affiliations
- American Football League Europe; Austrian Football League

Championships
- League championships: 22; AFLE: 2026; ELF: 2022; AFL: 1994, 1996, 1999–2003, 2005, 2007, 2009, 2012–2014, 2017, 2020; Eurobowl: 2004–2007, 2013

The Vienna Vikings are a professional American football club based in Vienna, Austria. Founded in 1983, the Vikings are known as one of Europe's most dominant clubs, having won the Eurobowl title five times (2004–2007 and 2013), as well as being the runner-up five times (2001, 2003, 2008, 2010 and 2012). In the national championship, the Vikings hold the record of 16 Austrian Bowl victories. Since the 2026 season, they’ve been members of the American Football League Europe (AFLE). The second team is still part of the Austrian Football League (AFL).

== History ==
The Vikings were founded in 1983. Three years later, the Vikings made it to the Austrian Bowl, the Austrian championship game, where they fell short against the Graz Giants. In 1994, the Vikings won their first national championship and repeated the victory two years later. In 1999, the Vikings played their eighth Austrian Bowl, all of them against the Giants, and gained their third title. It was also their first of five consecutive Austrian Bowl wins. Until 2007 the Vikings made it always to the Austrian Bowl and collected two more national titles becoming the team with the record number of 10 Austrian Bowl wins. From 2012 to 2017 the Vikings won four more national titles.

After also competing in the European Football League for many years, the club took part in a new European competition from 2014 to 2018 the BIG6 European Football League.

=== Naming rights ===
- 1983–1998: Vienna Vikings
- 1999–2005: Chrysler Vikings
- 2006–2007: Dodge Vikings Vienna
- 2008–2014: Raiffeisen Vikings Vienna
- 2015–2016: Vienna Vikings
- 2017–2022: Dacia Vienna Vikings

=== Notable persons ===
- George Paton – Defensive back 1993
- Mark Helfrich – Quarterback 1997
- Bernhard Seikovits – Vikings youth and senior
- Bernhard Raimann – Vikings youth
- Stacy Collins – Defensive coordinator 1999–2001
- Tony Hunt – Running back 2011
- Thomas Smythe – Head coach 1994–2006

== First team ==
=== European League of Football (2022–2025) ===
On 25 September 2021, the Vienna Vikings announced that their first team will compete in the 2022 European League of Football season together with their league rival Tyrolean Raiders The coaching staff of the former AFL team will continue coaching the ELF team. The franchise, now being a private corporation as a GesmbH, is owned by the Voluntary association. Together with its rivals Raiders Tirol the Vikings play in the Central Conference of the ELF. The participation allows the signing of up to 6 European foreign players and 4 US-American, Canadian, Mexican or Japanese players.

At the start of the 2022 season, business lawyer and long-time Austrian Football League quarterback Robin Lumsden joined as co-owner and investor. On 17 February 2022, the organisation announced that all home games in the ELF season will be played at the Generali Arena Vienna. In the regular season the team with quarterback Jackson Erdmann won ten out of twelve games and secured the top spot in the Central Division. Due to soccer club Austria Wien withdrawing the consent for the use of the Generali Arena, the semifinal had to be played at the football center Ravelin in front of 900 spectators, with Viking winning 39–12 versus Barcelona Dragons. The Championship Game was played in the Austrian city of Klagenfurt. The Vikings won the championship 27–15 against the Hamburg Sea Devils.

For the 2023 season, the team signed quarterback Chris Helbig from the Potsdam Royals. Most home games were played at Hohe Warte Stadium, only the opener took place at Generali Arena. The team had a perfect 12–0 record in the regular season. The semi final versus Stuttgart Surge was played at Generali Arena in front of 10,108 audience. However, the Vikings lost with 33–40.

For the 2024 season, the Vikings presented a new, different logo for the ELF team. Four games were played at Wiener Neustadt Arena, the other games were again held at Generali Arena. The Vikings with their new quarterback Ben Holmes won all regular season games again. The semifinal was held at Generali Arena in front of 10,981. The Vikings won 47–31 versus the Paris Musketeers. In their second championship game, played at Arena Auf Schalke in Gelsenkirchen, the Vikings faced the defending champions. In front of a 41,364 crowd, the Vikings never really found their feet in the game, and lost 20–51.

=== American Football League Europe (2026–present) ===
During the 2025 ELF season, the Vienna Vikings were one of teams to form the European Football Alliance, calling for greater transparency and equal treatment of franchises. Just days after the season ended, the EFA (now consisting of 11 of the ELF's 16 teams) announced their intentions to break away and form a new league for 2026. However, a split among these franchises led to two separate leagues, with the Vikings joining the newly-formed American Football League Europe.

The Vikings finished the 2026 season with an 11-1 record, the best in the league, and winning the South/East Conference title. The Vienna Vikings defeated the London Warriors 71-34 to advance to the inaugural AFLE Gold Bowl, where they handily defeated the Panthers Wrocław 68-5.

=== Roster ===
2025 Vienna Vikings season

=== Staff ===
2025 Vienna Vikings season

=== Season-by-season ===
| Season | Head coach | Regular season | | | | | Postseason | | | | Result | Ø Attendance |
| Season | Head coach | GP | Won | Lost | Win % | Finish | GP | Won | Lost | Win % | Result | Ø Attendance |
|---|---|---|---|---|---|---|---|---|---|---|---|---|
| 2022 | Chris Calaycay | 12 | 10 | 2 | .833 | 1st (Central) | 2 | 2 | 0 | 1.000 | Won Championship Game | 3,085 |
| 2023 | Chris Calaycay | 12 | 12 | 0 | 1.000 | 1st (Eastern) | 1 | 0 | 1 | .000 | Lost semifinal | 4,910 |
| 2024 | Chris Calaycay | 12 | 12 | 0 | 1.000 | 1st (Eastern) | 2 | 1 | 1 | .500 | Lost Championship Game | 6,168 |
| 2025 | Chris Calaycay | 12 | 11 | 1 | .917 | 1st (East) | 2 | 1 | 1 | .500 | Lost Championship Game | |
| 2026 | Chris Calaycay | 12 | 11 | 1 | .917 | 1st (South/East) | 2 | 2 | 0 | 1.00 | Won Championship Game | |
| Sum | | 60 | 56 | 4 | .933 | | 9 | 6 | 3 | | | 4,721 |

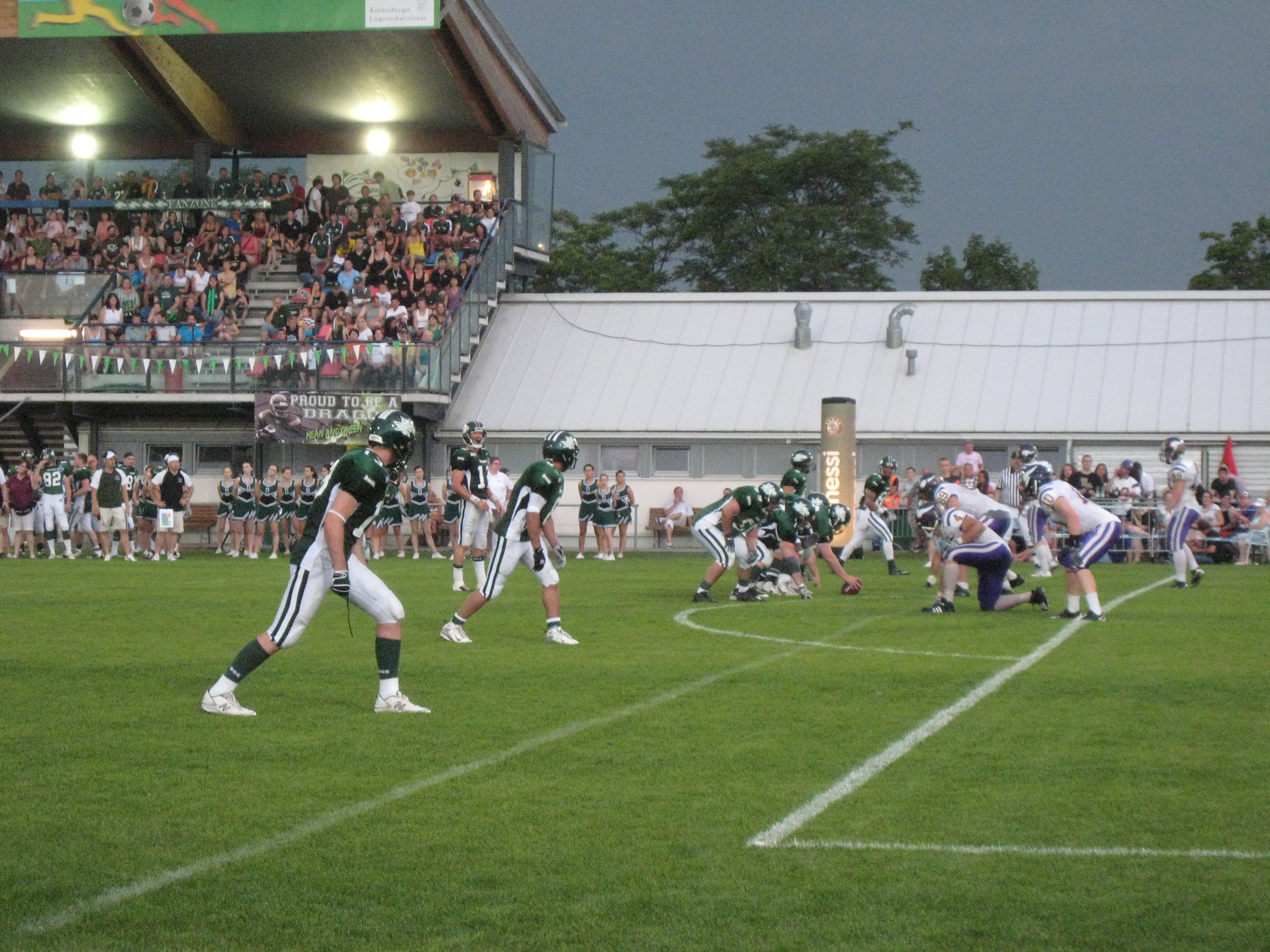
"Blue River Bowl III": Danube Dragons vs. Vikings at Rattenfängerstadion in Korneuburg, 2010

== Honours ==
- European League of Football
  - Champions: 2022
  - Runners-up: 2024, 2025
- American Football League Europe
  - Champions: 2026
- Eurobowl
  - Champions: (5) 2004–2007, 2013
  - Runners-up: (5) 2001, 2003, 2008, 2010, 2012
- Austrian Bowl
  - Champions: (15) 1994, 1996, 1999–2003, 2005, 2007, 2009, 2012–2014, 2017, 2020, ~~2025~~ (Note: The game was annulled due to an incorrectly declared player.)
  - Runners-up: (15) 1986, 1988, 1991, 1995, 1998, 2004, 2006, 2011, 2015, 2018, 2019, 2021–2024

=== Players ===
| Honor | Player Name | Season |
|---|---|---|
| ELF Man of the Year | (Austria) Noel Swancar | 2025 |
| AFLE Youngster of the Year | (Austria) Noel Swancar | 2026 |

=== Coaches ===
| Honor | Player Name | Season |
|---|---|---|
| AFLE Coach of the Year | (United States) Chris Calaycay | 2026 |
| AFLE Assistant Coach of the Year | (United States) Jordan Neuman | 2026 |
