= Alpine Rams =

Swiss American football team

Logo

General information
- Founded: 2026
- Headquartered: Biel, Switzerland
- Colors: Navy blue, gold, white

Personnel
- General manager: Joshua Fitzgerald
- Head coach: Joshua Fitzgerald

Team history
- Alpine Rams (2026–present)

Home fields
- Tissot Arena (2026–present)

League / conference affiliations
- American Football League Europe (2026–present): North/West Conference (2026–present)

The Alpine Rams is an American football team based in Biel, Switzerland. The Rams compete in the American Football League Europe (AFLE).

== History ==
On 9 November 2025, the Alpine Rams were unveiled at an NFL watch party in Zurich as a new professional American football franchise based in the Canton of Bern, with the project being led by Olly Masion Hospitality Group with Joshua Fitzgerald as the general manager. The franchise planned to compete in a "top European league" in 2026 amidst the turmoil of the European League of Football (ELF), deliberately distancing itself from the Swiss ELF team, the Helvetic Mercenaries. On 17 December, the Alpine Rams were announced as the fourth franchise to officially join the American Football League Europe (AFLE) for its inaugural 2026 season. The team also announced that it would play its home games at the Tissot Arena in Biel. Defensive back and return specialist Devan Burrell was signed as the first player in franchise history on 7 February 2026.

The Alpine Rams made their on-field debut on 31 May 2026, a 24-14 home loss to the Berlin Thunder. On 7 June, the Rams recorded their first win, defeating the London Warriors 23-20 at Cherry Red Records Stadium. The Rams would finish their inaugural season with a 3-9 record, ending with a 34-28 defeat of the Paris Lights in the first overtime game in AFLE history.

=== Season-by-season ===
Season	Head coach	Regular season					Postseason				Result	Ø Attendance
Season	Head coach	GP	Won	Lost	Win %	Finish	GP	Won	Lost	Win %	Result	Ø Attendance
2026	Joshua Fitzgerald	12	3	9	.250	3rd (North/West)	DNQ					
Total	—	12	3	9	.250	—	0	0	0	.000	—	

== Stadium ==
When the Alpine Rams were confirmed to join the AFLE for the 2026 AFLE season, it was announced that they would play their home games at Tissot Arena, a 5,000-seat football stadium in Biel, Switzerland.

== Coaches ==
American coach Joshua Fitzgerald, the former head coach of the Hannover Stampeders and wide receivers coach of the Helvetic Mercenaries, was named the first coach and general manager of the Alpine Rams.

== Honors ==
=== Players ===
Honor	Player Name	Season
AFLE Homegrown of the Year	(France) Keven Kaya	2026
