= Pittsburgh Colts =

- Founded: 1979
- League: Independent
- Team history: Pittsburgh Colts (1979–present)
- Based in: Pittsburgh, Pennsylvania
- Stadium: Sto Rox High School
- Colors: Red, white, blue
- President: Ed Brosky
- Head coach: Ed Brosky
- General manager: Chaz Kellem

The Pittsburgh Colts are the oldest minor-league professional football team, located in Pittsburgh, Pennsylvania, that is still in existence. Since 2018 they have been playing an independent schedule.

The team was founded in 1979 by Ed Brosky, who either played for or coached the Colts in every season since. Since its inception, 32 players who played for the Colts have received a professional contract.

== History ==
The team was founded in 1979 by head coach Edward G. Brosky, a member of the Pittsburgh Panthers 1976 national championship team, and played in the Keystone Oaks area. Brosky also played as a semi-pro football player while playing college football, until then-Panthers coach Johnny Majors found out and ended Brosky's moonlighting. When he left Pitt, Brosky continued to play for semi-pro teams in the area. He started the Colts when those other teams folded.

The Colts initial run lasted from 1979 until 1987, when the team took a four-year hiatus. In that span, the team reached the Minor Professional Football Association minor league championship in 1981 to play against the Twin City Cougars, who later became the Oakland Invaders of the United States Football League. The team also played one season as a pro team, when they were member of the American Football Association in that league's final season.

In the mid-1990s, Brosky struck a deal with the Northgate School District. It was during this time that two notables were linked with the team; WTAE-TV field reporter Sheldon Ingram played in the defensive backfield while future music video director Matt Dilmore served as the team's official announcer. The team draw talent from the area high schools and local colleges including: Allegheny College, Bethany College, California University of Pennsylvania, Carnegie Mellon University, Duquesne University, Indiana University of Pennsylvania, University of Pittsburgh, Robert Morris College, Slippery Rock University, Washington & Jefferson College, and James Madison University in Virginia. The Colts describe themselves as a "throwback team" based on a strong work ethic and personal values. The Colts have interacted with the community they are in through numerous youth activities, visiting children's hospital, and having community events downtown.

The team briefly disbanded again after the 2000 season due its board of directors and coaching staff have become the ownership group of the Pittsburgh Ironmen, a new professional indoor football team set to begin competing in February 2001.

The Colts were previously members of the American, North American Football League, and Regional American Football League before Edward Brosky formed the Grassroots Football League in 2009. The Colts played in the Semi-Pro Football League from 2010 to 2014 before joining the Gridiron Developmental Football League for the 2015 season. They also played at Chartiers Valley for the 2015 season.

In 2004 Lisa Horton became the first woman to throw a touchdown pass in a men's America Football League game.

The Colts joined the Pennsylvania Football League (PFL) in 2017, which was their last full season. They were supposed to rejoin the Gridiron Developmental Football League (GDFL) in 2021, but it never materialized. Since 2018 the team plays independent schedule.

== Season-by-season ==
=== 2007 season ===
The Colts played the 2007 season at two fields: Robert Morris University and Moon Stadium

Home Game Dates:June 16( Home opener vs. North Coast Vikings), June 23, July 7, July 14, July 28, August 11.

Games played: June 9: Pittsburgh Colts 33, Rochester Renegades 6

=== 2008 season ===
The Colts played their 2008 season at South Stadium in Pittsburgh's SouthSide

- 6/14/2008 Pittsburgh Colts Vs Penn-Ohio Tigers: Win 30–20
- 6/21/2008 Pittsburgh Colts At Detroit Seminoles: Loss 58–8
- 7/5/2008 Pittsburgh Colts At Rochester Renegades: Win 34–0
- 7/12/2008 Pittsburgh Colts At Penn-Ohio Tigers: Win 20–12
- 7/19/2008 Pittsburgh Colts Vs New Castle Thunder: Loss 14–10
- 7/26/2008 Pittsburgh Colts Vs Mon-Valley Mayhem: Win 41–20
- 8/2/2008 Pittsburgh Colts Vs Jackson City Bears:Win 56–0
- 8/9/2008 Pittsburgh Colts AT Mon-Valley Mayhem:Win 6–0
- 8/16/2008 Pittsburgh Colts Vs Beaver County Warriors:Loss 14–10

—GFL Championship--

- 8/25/2008 Pittsburgh Colts Vs Penn-Ohio Tigers:Win 11–9

-Game won on a last second field goal

- Did not advance to the RAFL playoffs by team decision due to too many injuries

=== 2009 season ===
The Colts play the 2009 season at Ambridge high school Stadium

- 5/14/2009 Pittsburgh Colts At Mon Valley Mayhem: Win 69–1
- 5/30/2009 Pittsburgh Colts At Pittsburgh Blue Devils: Win 37–6
- 6/13/2009 Pittsburgh Colts At Canton Hurricanes: Win 28–12
- 6/20/2009 Pittsburgh Colts At Erie Invaders: Win 28–0
- 6/27/2009 Pittsburgh Colts Vs Erie Invaders: Win 42–12
- 7/4/2009 Pittsburgh Colts Vs Cleveland Cobras: Loss 30–22
- 7/11/2009 Pittsburgh Colts Vs Mon Valley Mayhem: Win 14–0
- 7/18/2009 Pittsburgh Colts Vs Crestview Renegades: Win 22–12
- 8/1/2009 Pittsburgh Colts Vs Steel Valley Warriors:Win 37–6

Playoffs

- 8/8/2009 Bye
- 8/15/2009 Pittsburgh Colts Vs Lake Erie Invaders:Win 38–0

Championship

- 8/22/2009 Pittsburgh Colts Vs Cuyahoga County Spartans:Win 26–14

== Championships ==
- 2009– (10–1) Grassroots Football League Champions
- 2008– (7–3) Grassroots Football League Champions/Chose not to advance because of the amount of injuries
- 2007– (15–1) Grassroots Division Champions/ Lost in 3rd Round of NAFL Playoffs to Kane County Eagles
- 2006– (10–3) Grassroots Division Champions
- 2005– (13–1) Grassroots Division Champions
- 1981– Participated in Minor Professional Football Association's National Championship Game

== Home field ==
In the first few years the Colts played in the Keystone Oaks area. From 1991 to 1996 the Colts played in Stonefield Northpark and from 1997 to 2000 played in Duquesne. Recent Locations include, Uniontown, Chartiers Valley and Carlynton. The team has been in several communities throughout its history. Most recently the team played at Ambridge High School.

== Television appearances ==
The Pittsburgh Colts alongside a number of National Football League free agents took part in the filming of an episode of Shaq Vs. During the episode of the ABC show, Shaquille O'Neal competed against Ben Roethlisberger in a game of 7 on 7. The teams were a mix between the Free Agents and Colts and the game was won by Big Ben's Team 21–14.

In 2005 members of the Colts have appeared in television spots, suiting up as fictional members of the Pittsburgh Steelers and Cleveland Browns in a commercial for the University of Pittsburgh Medical Center.
