= Firenze Red Lions =

American football team in Italy

Logo

General information
- Founded: February 26, 2026
- Folded: November 4, 2026
- Headquartered: Florence, Italy
- Colors: Red, purple

Personnel
- General manager: Bart Iaccarino
- Head coach: Bill Shuey

Team history
- Firenze Red Lions (2026)

Home fields
- Guelfi Sports Center (2026); Stadio Gino Bozzi (2026)

League / conference affiliations
- American Football League Europe (2026): South/East Conference (2026)

The Firenze Red Lions were an American football team based in Florence, Italy. The Red Lions competed in the American Football League Europe (AFLE).

== History ==
On 26 February 2026, the American Football League Europe (AFLE) officially unveiled the Firenze Red Lions as its Italian franchise ahead of the league's inaugural season. The announcement marked Florence's entry into the new European professional American football landscape, with the team revealing its name, logo, and identity through a launch campaign that emphasized the city's historical heritage and symbolic connection to the lion as a representation of strength and pride.

In the following months, the franchise began building its organizational structure, assembling a coaching staff and roster composed of both Italian and international players as it prepared for its first competitive season. Veteran coach Bill Shuey was appointed as head coach, bringing extensive experience from the NFL and establishing the foundations of the team's sporting philosophy centered on discipline, structure, and long-term development.

The Firenze Red Lions played their first official game on 30 May 2026, marking the beginning of their competitive history in the AFLE. In their debut, they scored their first touchdown in franchise history through quarterback Matthew McKay but ultimately fell 30–8 against the Paris Lights. The Red Lions would finish their inaugural season with a winless 0-12 record.

On 4 November 2026, the AFLE unexpectedly parted ways with the Red Lions, with Guelfi Firenze replacing them. This came as a shock to the organization who received no prior communication to this, describing the AFLE's handling of the situation as "dissapointing."

=== Season-by-season ===
Season	Head coach	Regular season					Postseason				Result	Ø Attendance
Season	Head coach	GP	Won	Lost	Win %	Finish	GP	Won	Lost	Win %	Result	Ø Attendance
2026	Bill Shuey	12	0	12	.000	4th (South/East)	DNQ					
Total	—	12	0	12	.000	—	0	0	0	.000	—	

== Stadium ==
The team announced the Guelfi Sports Center in Florence as their home stadium for the 2026 season, establishing a dedicated base for American football in the city and confirming their long-term operational setup within the league structure.

On 11 June 2026, the Red Lions announced that it would be playing the final five games of its inaugural season at Stadio Gino Bozzi.

== Honors ==
=== Players ===
Honor	Player Name	Season
AFLE Special Teams Player of the Year	(Panama) Brandon Belgrave	2026
