= 2026 American Football League Europe season =

2026 AFLE season
- League: American Football League Europe
- Sport: American football
- Duration: 23 May – 6 September 2026
- Games: 48 + 3 playoff games
- Teams: 8
- Total attendance: 98,926 (39/51 games)
- Average attendance: 2,536 (39/51 games)
- TV partner(s): Sport1 (Germany, Austria, Switzerland); Krone TV (Austria); Polsat Sport (Poland); Red Bull TV (Worldwide/Vikings Games Only); Sport en France (France)
- Streaming partner: AFLE+
- North/West Division champions: (Germany) Rhein Fire
- South/East Division champions: (Austria) Vienna Vikings

2026 AFLE Gold Bowl
- Date: 6 September 2026
- Venue: Schauinsland-Reisen-Arena, Duisburg
- Champions: (Austria) Vienna Vikings

Seasons
- ELF 2025 2027

The 2026 American Football League Europe season was the inaugural season of the American Football League Europe, a professional American football league based in Europe. Eight teams from seven countries participated. The season started on May 23, 2026, and concluded with the championship game, called AFLE Gold Bowl on September 6, 2026.

== Format and Teams ==
2026 American Football League Europe season (Europe)
Locations of teams competing in the 2025 AFLE season.
- South/East Division
- North/West Division

The new league was presented in December 2025. It is composed of four teams which previously played in the European League of Football, one from the BAFA National Leagues, and three newly founded teams. The teams are divided into two regional conferences: North/West and South/East.

Each team will play each other team in the conference twice, and from the other conference two teams twice and two teams once. Hence each team will play twelve games over fourteen weeks. The two conference winners and the additional two best teams overall will qualify for the playoffs.

Teams	Location	Stadium	Capacity	Head Coach	2025
North/West Division
Alpine Rams	(Switzerland) Biel/Bienne	Tissot Arena (5 games)	5,200	(United States) Joshua Fitzgerald	new
Alpine Rams	(Switzerland) Winterthur	Stadion Deutweg (1 game)	540	(United States) Joshua Fitzgerald	new
London Warriors	(United Kingdom) London	Cherry Red Records Stadium (2 games)	9,215	(United Kingdom) Tony Allen	BAFA Premier, 9–1, lost Championship Game
London Warriors	(United Kingdom) London	Rosslyn Park Stadium (1 game)	2,000	(United Kingdom) Tony Allen	BAFA Premier, 9–1, lost Championship Game
London Warriors	(United Kingdom) London	Trailfinders Sports Ground (2 games)	5,388	(United Kingdom) Tony Allen	BAFA Premier, 9–1, lost Championship Game
London Warriors	(Spain) Palma	Estadio Balear (1 game)	5,500	(United Kingdom) Tony Allen	BAFA Premier, 9–1, lost Championship Game
Paris Lights	(France) L'Île-Saint-Denis	Complexe Sportif de l’Île-des-Vannes (1 game)	6,000	(United States) David Shelton	new
Paris Lights	(France) Athis-Mons	Stade Robert Barran (1 game)	300	(United States) David Shelton	new
Paris Lights	(France) Paris	Vélodrome Jacques-Anquetil (4 games)	7,151	(United States) David Shelton	new
Rhein Fire	(Germany) Düsseldorf/Duisburg	Schauinsland-Reisen-Arena (6 games)	31,500	(United States) Mark Ridgley	ELF, 8–4, Wild Card game
Rhein Fire	(Germany) Oberhausen	Niederrheinstadion (1 game)	17,165	(United States) Mark Ridgley	ELF, 8–4, Wild Card game
South/East Division
Berlin Thunder	(Germany) Berlin	Friedrich-Ludwig-Jahn-Sportpark, Kleines Stadion	2,000	(United States) Shawn Cooper	ELF, 3–9
Firenze Red Lions	(Italy) Florence	Guelfi Sports Center (1 game)	750	(United States) Bill Shuey	new
Firenze Red Lions	(Italy) Florence	Stadio Gino Bozzi (5 games)	3,800	(United States) Bill Shuey	new
Vienna Vikings	(Austria) Vienna	Wiener Sport-Club Stadium (6 games)	5,600	(United States) Chris Calaycay	ELF, 11–1, lost Championship Game
Vienna Vikings	(Austria) Vienna	Generali Arena (1 game)	15,014	(United States) Chris Calaycay	ELF, 11–1, lost Championship Game
Panthers Wrocław	(Poland) Wrocław	Olympic Stadium (5 games)	11,000	(United States) Dave Likins	ELF, 5–7
Panthers Wrocław	(Poland) Wrocław	Tarczyński Arena (1 game)	45,105	(United States) Dave Likins	ELF, 5–7

== Regular season ==
=== Overview ===
Home \ Away	ALP	BTH	FIR	LON	WPA	PAR	RHF	VIK
Alpine Rams	—	14–24	45–42	26–27	—	22–23	13–45	24–47
Berlin Thunder	40–17	—	49–3	29–40	33–36	—	28–49	7–45
Firenze Red Lions	—	12–45	—	34–44	7–48	26–45	14–66	6–68
London Warriors	20–23	—	51–26	—	21–41	34–26	30–40	10–62
Panthers Wrocław	44–14	50–12	62–0	41–0	—	38–27	—	23–42
Paris Lights	28–34	7–48	30–8	23–44	14–22	—	6–66	—
Rhein Fire	59–6	45–36	—	43–6	48–7	35–0	—	16–28
Vienna Vikings	47–20	49–7	63–17	—	31–34	56–6	24–10	—

Updated to match(es) played on 15 August 2026. Source: AFLE
Legend: Blue = home team win; Red = away team win.

=== Standings ===
==== North/West Division ====
North/West Division
Pos	Team	GP	W	L	DIV	PF	PA	DIFF	STK	Qualification
1	Rhein Fire	12	10	2	6–0	518	198	+320	W5	Qualification to semi-finals
2	London Warriors	12	6	6	3–3	327	414	−87	L2	Qualification to semi-finals
3	Alpine Rams	12	3	9	2–4	258	446	−188	W1	
4	Paris Lights	12	3	9	1–5	236	428	−192	L3	

Source: League Standings

==== South/East Division ====
South/East Division
Pos	Team	GP	W	L	DIV	PF	PA	DIFF	STK	Qualification
1	Vienna Vikings	12	11	1	5–1	562	180	+382	W2	Qualification to semi-finals
2	Panthers Wrocław	12	10	2	5–1	446	249	+197	W5	Qualification to semi-finals
3	Berlin Thunder	12	5	7	2–4	357	368	–11	L1	
4	Firenze Red Lions	12	0	12	0–6	195	616	–421	L12	

Source: League Standings

==== League Wide ====
Pos	Team	Pld	W	L	PF	PA	PD	Qualification
1	z – Vienna Vikings	12	11	1	562	180	+382	Qualification to semi-finals
2	y – Rhein Fire	12	10	2	518	198	+320	Qualification to semi-finals
3	x – Panthers Wrocław	12	10	2	446	249	+197	Qualification to semi-finals
4	x – London Warriors	12	6	6	327	414	−87	Qualification to semi-finals
5	e – Berlin Thunder	12	5	7	357	368	−11	
6	e – Alpine Rams	12	3	9	258	446	−188	
7	e – Paris Lights	12	3	9	236	428	−192	
8	e – Firenze Red Lions	12	0	12	195	616	−421	

Source: League Standings

Tiebreaker: Total Wins, Winning Percentage, Head-to-Head Record, Strength of Victory (SOV), Total Points Differential (capped at ±35 points per game), Total Points Scored, Points Differential in Head-to-Head Games, Away Wins, Coin Toss.
Legend

x — Clinched playoff berth
y — Clinched division
z — Clinched regular season winner
e — Eliminated from playoffs

=== Schedule ===
==== Week 1 ====
Date	Time	Away team	Result	Home team	Venue	Attendance	Ref
Sat, 23 May	5:00 pm	Berlin Thunder	7 – 49	Vienna Vikings	Wiener Sport-Club Stadium, Vienna	3,821	
Sun, 24 May	2:00 pm	Panthers Wrocław	41 – 21	London Warriors	Cherry Red Records Stadium, London	503	
Bye week	Firenze Red Lions, Paris Lights, Alpine Rams, Rhein Fire						

==== Week 2 ====
Date	Time	Away team	Result	Home team	Venue	Attendance	Ref
Sat, 30 May	10:00 am	Firenze Red Lions	8 – 30	Paris Lights	Complexe Sportif de l’Île-des-Vannes, L'Île-Saint-Denis	1,100	
Sat, 30 May	6:00 pm	London Warriors	6 – 43	Rhein Fire	Schauinsland-Reisen-Arena, Duisburg	4,886	
Sun, 31 May	2:40 pm	Vienna Vikings	42 – 23	Panthers Wrocław	Olympic Stadium, Wrocław	1,829	
Sun, 31 May	4:10 pm	Berlin Thunder	24 – 14	Alpine Rams	Tissot Arena, Biel/Bienne		

==== Week 3 ====
Date	Time	Away team	Result	Home team	Venue	Attendance	Ref
Sat, 6 June	1:00 pm	Panthers Wrocław	22 – 14	Paris Lights	Stade Robert Barran, Athis-Mons	537	
Sat, 6 June	4:10 pm	Berlin Thunder	45 – 12	Firenze Red Lions	Guelfi Sports Center, Florence	66	
Sat, 6 June	4:45 pm	Rhein Fire	10 – 24	Vienna Vikings	Generali Arena, Vienna	11,209	
Sun, 7 June	3:00 pm	Alpine Rams	23 – 20	London Warriors	Cherry Red Records Stadium, London	526	

==== Week 4 ====
Date	Time	Away team	Result	Home team	Venue	Attendance	Ref
Sat, 13 June	6:00 pm	Alpine Rams	20 – 47	Vienna Vikings	Wiener Sport-Club Stadium, Vienna	3,856	
Sat, 13 June	6:00 pm	Paris Lights	0 – 35	Rhein Fire	Schauinsland-Reisen-Arena, Duisburg	4,219	
Sun, 14 June	2:00 pm	Firenze Red Lions	26 – 51	London Warriors	Rosslyn Park Stadium, London	230	
Sun, 14 June	4:10 pm	Berlin Thunder	12 – 50	Panthers Wrocław	Tarczyński Arena, Wrocław	5,143	

==== Week 5 ====
Date	Time	Away team	Result	Home team	Venue	Attendance	Ref
Sat, 20 June	6:00 pm	Paris Lights	23 – 22	Alpine Rams	Tissot Arena, Biel/Bienne	406	
Sun, 21 June	3:00 pm	Vienna Vikings	62 – 10	London Warriors	Trailfinders Sports Ground, London		
Sun, 21 June	5:10 pm	Berlin Thunder	36 – 45	Rhein Fire	Schauinsland-Reisen-Arena, Duisburg	4,907	
Bye week	Firenze Red Lions, Panthers Wrocław						

==== Week 6 ====
Date	Time	Away team	Result	Home team	Venue	Attendance	Ref
Sat, 27 June	5:10 pm	Rhein Fire	45 – 13	Alpine Rams	Tissot Arena, Biel/Bienne		
Sun, 28 June	2:30 pm	Panthers Wrocław	48 – 7	Firenze Red Lions	Stadio Gino Bozzi, Florence		
Bye week	Berlin Thunder, London Warriors, Paris Lights, Vienna Vikings						

==== Week 7 ====
Date	Time	Away team	Result	Home team	Venue	Attendance	Ref
Sat, 4 July	3:00 pm	Paris Lights	36 – 45	Panthers Wrocław	Olympic Stadium, Wrocław	2,659	
Sat, 4 July	5:00 pm	London Warriors	44 – 34	Firenze Red Lions	Stadio Gino Bozzi, Florence		
Sun, 5 July	4:40 pm	Vienna Vikings	45 – 7	Berlin Thunder	Friedrich-Ludwig-Jahn-Sportpark, Kleines Stadion, Berlin		
Bye week	Alpine Rams, Rhein Fire						

==== Week 8 ====
Date	Time	Away team	Result	Home team	Venue	Attendance	Ref
Sat, 11 July	4:30 pm	London Warriors	27 – 26	Alpine Rams	Tissot Arena, Biel/Bienne	400	
Sat, 11 July	6:00 pm	Paris Lights	6 – 56	Vienna Vikings	Wiener Sport-Club Stadium, Vienna	4,146	
Sun, 12 July	2:00 pm	Firenze Red Lions	3 – 49	Berlin Thunder	Friedrich-Ludwig-Jahn-Sportpark, Kleines Stadion, Berlin		
Sun, 12 July	4:55 pm	Panthers Wrocław	7 – 48	Rhein Fire	Schauinsland-Reisen-Arena, Duisburg	5,008	

==== Week 9 ====
Date	Time	Away team	Result	Home team	Venue	Attendance	Ref
Sat, 18 July	1:00 pm	London Warriors	44 – 23	Paris Lights	Vélodrome Jacques-Anquetil, Paris		
Sat, 18 July	5:10 pm	Alpine Rams	17 – 40	Berlin Thunder	Friedrich-Ludwig-Jahn-Sportpark, Kleines Stadion, Berlin	230	
Sat, 18 July	5:10 pm	Vienna Vikings	28 – 16	Rhein Fire	Schauinsland-Reisen-Arena, Duisburg	6,055	
Sun, 19 July	3:00 pm	Firenze Red Lions	0 – 62	Panthers Wrocław	Olympic Stadium, Wrocław	1,378	

==== Week 10 ====
Date	Time	Away team	Result	Home team	Venue	Attendance	Ref
Sat, 25 July	3:00 pm	Alpine Rams	14 – 44	Panthers Wrocław	Olympic Stadium, Wrocław	1,655	
Sun, 26 July	4:40 pm	Rhein Fire	66 – 6	Paris Lights	Vélodrome Jacques-Anquetil, Paris		
Sun, 26 July	5:00 pm	Vienna Vikings	68 – 6	Firenze Red Lions	Stadio Gino Bozzi, Florence		
Bye week	Berlin Thunder, London Warriors						

==== Week 11 ====
Date	Time	Away team	Result	Home team	Venue	Attendance	Ref
Sat, 1 August	5:10 pm	Paris Lights	45 – 26	Firenze Red Lions	Stadio Gino Bozzi, Florence	43	
Sat, 1 August	6:00 pm	Alpine Rams	6 – 59	Rhein Fire	Schauinsland-Reisen-Arena, Duisburg	5,136	
Sun, 2 August	3:10 pm	London Warriors	40 – 29	Berlin Thunder	Friedrich-Ludwig-Jahn-Sportpark, Kleines Stadion, Berlin	364	
Bye week	Panthers Wrocław, Vienna Vikings						

==== Week 12 ====
Date	Time	Away team	Result	Home team	Venue	Attendance	Ref
Sat, 8 August	4:00 pm	Firenze Red Lions	42 – 45	Alpine Rams	Tissot Arena, Biel/Bienne		
Sat, 8 August	6:00 pm	Panthers Wrocław	34 – 31	Vienna Vikings	Wiener Sport-Club Stadium, Vienna	4,215	
Sun, 9 August	3:00 pm	Paris Lights	26 – 34	London Warriors	Trailfinders Sports Ground, London	1,312	
Sun, 9 August	4:10 pm	Rhein Fire	49 – 28	Berlin Thunder	Friedrich-Ludwig-Jahn-Sportpark, Kleines Stadion, Berlin	786	

==== Week 13 ====
Date	Time	Away team	Result	Home team	Venue	Attendance	Ref
Sat, 15 August	1:00 pm	Berlin Thunder	47 – 8	Paris Lights	Vélodrome Jacques-Anquetil, Paris	252	
Sat, 15 August	6:00 pm	Vienna Vikings	47 – 24	Alpine Rams	Stadion Deutweg, Winterthur	534	
Sun, 16 August	3:00 pm	London Warriors	0 – 41	Panthers Wrocław	Olympic Stadium, Wrocław		
Sun, 16 August	4:40 pm	Rhein Fire	66 – 14	Firenze Red Lions	Stadio Gino Bozzi, Florence	93	

==== Week 14 ====
Date	Time	Away team	Result	Home team	Venue	Attendance	Ref
Sat, 22 August	3:00 pm	Panthers Wrocław	36 – 33	Berlin Thunder	Friedrich-Ludwig-Jahn-Sportpark, Kleines Stadion, Berlin	375	
Sat, 22 August	6:00 pm	Firenze Red Lions	17 – 63	Vienna Vikings	Wiener Sport-Club Stadium, Vienna	4,127	
Sat, 22 August	8:00 pm	Rhein Fire	40 – 30	London Warriors	Estadio Balear, Palma de Mallorca	1,346	
Sun, 23 August	1:00 pm	Alpine Rams	34 – 28	Paris Lights	Vélodrome Jacques-Anquetil, Paris	272	

== Attendance ==
Pos	Team	Total	High	Low	Average	Change
1	Vienna Vikings	31,670	11,209	3,856	5,278	−16.5%
2	Rhein Fire	30,211	6,055	4,219	5,035	−50.7%
3	Panthers Wrocław	12,664	5,143	1,378	2,533	+8.0%
4	London Warriors	3,917	1,346	230	783	n/a
5	Paris Lights	2,161	1,100	252	540	n/a
6	Berlin Thunder	1,755	786	230	439	−31.8%
7	Alpine Rams	1,340	534	400	447	n/a
8	Firenze Red Lions	202	93	43	67	n/a
	League total	83,920	11,209	43	2,331	n/a

Updated to games played on 22 August 2026
Source: AFLE

== Play-offs ==
The Gold Bowl was played on 6 September 2026 at Schauinsland-Reisen-Arena in Duisburg.

Semi-finals
1	(Austria) Vienna Vikings	71
4	(United Kingdom) London Warriors	34
2	(Germany) Rhein Fire	40
3	(Poland) Panthers Wrocław	41

Gold Bowl
1	(Austria) Vienna Vikings	68
3	(Poland) Panthers Wrocław	5

=== Semi-finals ===
==== London Warriors 34, Vienna Vikings 71 ====
Vienna Vikings vs. London Warriors

Quarter	1	2	3	4	Total
Warriors	7	13	7	7	34
Vikings	20	35	13	3	71

at Wiener Sport-Club Stadium, Vienna, Austria

- Date: 29 August 2026
- Game time: 6:00 p.m CEST
- Game attendance: 4,561
- Referee: Gyula Udvardi

==== Panthers Wrocław 41, Rhein Fire 40 ====
Rhein Fire vs. Panthers Wrocław

Quarter	1	2	3	4	Total
Panthers	20	7	0	14	41
Fire	7	14	13	6	40

at Niederrheinstadion, Oberhausen, Germany

- Date: 30 August 2026
- Game time: 3:10 p.m CEST
- Game attendance: 4,232
- Referee: Krzysztof Walentynowicz

=== Gold Bowl ===
==== Panthers Wrocław 5, Vienna Vikings 62 ====
Vienna Vikings vs. Panthers Wrocław

Quarter	1	2	3	4	Total
Panthers	0	5	0	0	5
Vikings	21	27	14	6	68

at Schauinsland-Reisen-Arena, Duisburg, Germany

- Date: 6 September 2026
- Game time: 3:30 p.m CEST
- Game attendance: 6,113
- Referee: John Haentjens

== Awards ==
=== MVP of the Week ===
Week	Player	Position	Team
1	(United States) Jameson Wang	Quarterback	(Poland) Panthers Wrocław
2	(United States) Kenji Bahar	Quarterback	(Germany) Rhein Fire
3	(United States) Jon Cole	Wide Receiver	(Germany) Berlin Thunder
4	(United States) Karé Lyles	Quarterback	(United Kingdom) London Warriors
5	(Italy) Tiberio Calbucci	Linebacker	(France) Paris Lights
6	(Poland) Bartosz Woch	Running Back	(Poland) Panthers Wrocław
7	(Finland) Karri Pajarinen	Running Back	(Austria) Vienna Vikings
8	(United Kingdom) Jezreel Agu	Defensive End	(United Kingdom) London Warriors
9	(United States) Jameson Wang	Quarterback	(Poland) Panthers Wrocław
10	(Austria) Albert Wiesigstrauch	Running Back	(Austria) Vienna Vikings
11	(United Kingdom) Andy Owusu	Running Back	(United Kingdom) London Warriors
12	(United Kingdom) Jezreel Agu	Defensive End	(United Kingdom) London Warriors
13	(United States) Jameson Wang	Quarterback	(Poland) Panthers Wrocław
14	(United States) Jon Cole	Wide Receiver	(Germany) Berlin Thunder
SF	(United States) Jameson Wang	Wide Receiver	(Poland) Panthers Wrocław
GB	(United States) Mike Harley Jr.	Quarterback	(Austria) Vienna Vikings

=== Season Awards ===
Award	Player	Team	Position
Most Valuable Player	(United States) Jameson Wang	Panthers Wrocław	Quarterback
Offensive Player of the Year	(United States) Jon Cole	Berlin Thunder	Wide Receiver
Defensive Player of the Year	(United States) Nazir Steather	Rhein Fire	Safety
Youngster of the Year	(Austria) Noel Swancar	Vienna Vikings	Linebacker
Most Improved Offensive Player of the Year	(Germany) Bais Kouanda	Berlin Thunder	Wide Receiver
Most Improved Defensive Player of the Year	(Spain) Diego Paz	Rhein Fire	Defensive End
Special Teams Player of the Year	(Panama) Brandon Belgrave	Firenze Red Lions	Kick Returner
Offensive Lineman of the Year	(Germany) Sven Breidenbach	Rhein Fire	Offensive Tackle
Homegrown of the Year	(France) Kevin Kaya	Alpine Rams	Wide Receiver
Coach of the Year	(United States) Chris Calaycay	Vienna Vikings	Head Coach
Assistant Coach of the Year	(United States) Jordan Neuman	Vienna Vikings	Offensive Coordinator
