= Paris Lights =

American football team in France

Logo

General information
- Founded: 2026
- Headquartered: Paris, France
- Colors: Gold, cream, black, white

Personnel
- General manager: Frantzy Dorlean
- Head coach: David Shelton

Team history
- Paris Lights (2026–present)

League / conference affiliations
- American Football League Europe (2026–present): North/West Conference (2026–present)

The Paris Lights is an American football team based in Paris, France. The Lights compete in the American Football League Europe (AFLE).

== History ==
On 18 December 2025, the American Football League Europe (AFLE) announced the creation of a new Paris-based franchise ahead of the league's inaugural 2026 season, in direct competition with the Paris Musketeers of the European Football Alliance. The project was spearheaded by former Musketeers executives Frantzy Dorlean and Marc-Angelo Soumah under the provisional name of Paris American Football Team. The Lights name, logo, and colors were unveiled on Super Bowl Sunday on 8 February 2026, becoming the sixth franchise to officially join the league. On 24 February, it was announced that former Canadian Football League (CFL) player David Shelton would serve as the Lights' first head coach.

The Lights made their on-field debut on 30 May 2026, defeating the Firenze Red Lions 30-8. Paris finished their inaugural season with a 3-9 record, last in the North/West Division, closing out the season with 34-28 loss to the Alpine Rams in the first overtime game in AFLE history.

=== Season-by-season ===
Season	Head coach	Regular season					Postseason				Result	Ø Attendance
Season	Head coach	GP	Won	Lost	Win %	Finish	GP	Won	Lost	Win %	Result	Ø Attendance
2026	David Shelton	12	3	9	.250	4th (North/West)	DNQ					
Total	—	12	3	9	.250	—	0	0	0	.000	—	

== Stadium ==
The Paris Lights split their home games between the Complexe Sportif de l’Île-des-Vannes in L'Île-Saint-Denis, Stade Robert Barran in Houilles, and Vélodrome Jacques Anquetil.

== See also ==
- Paris Musketeers, a professional American Football team competing in the European Football Alliance
