= Plough Lane =

Football stadium in Wimbledon, SW London

- The Cherry Red Records Stadium
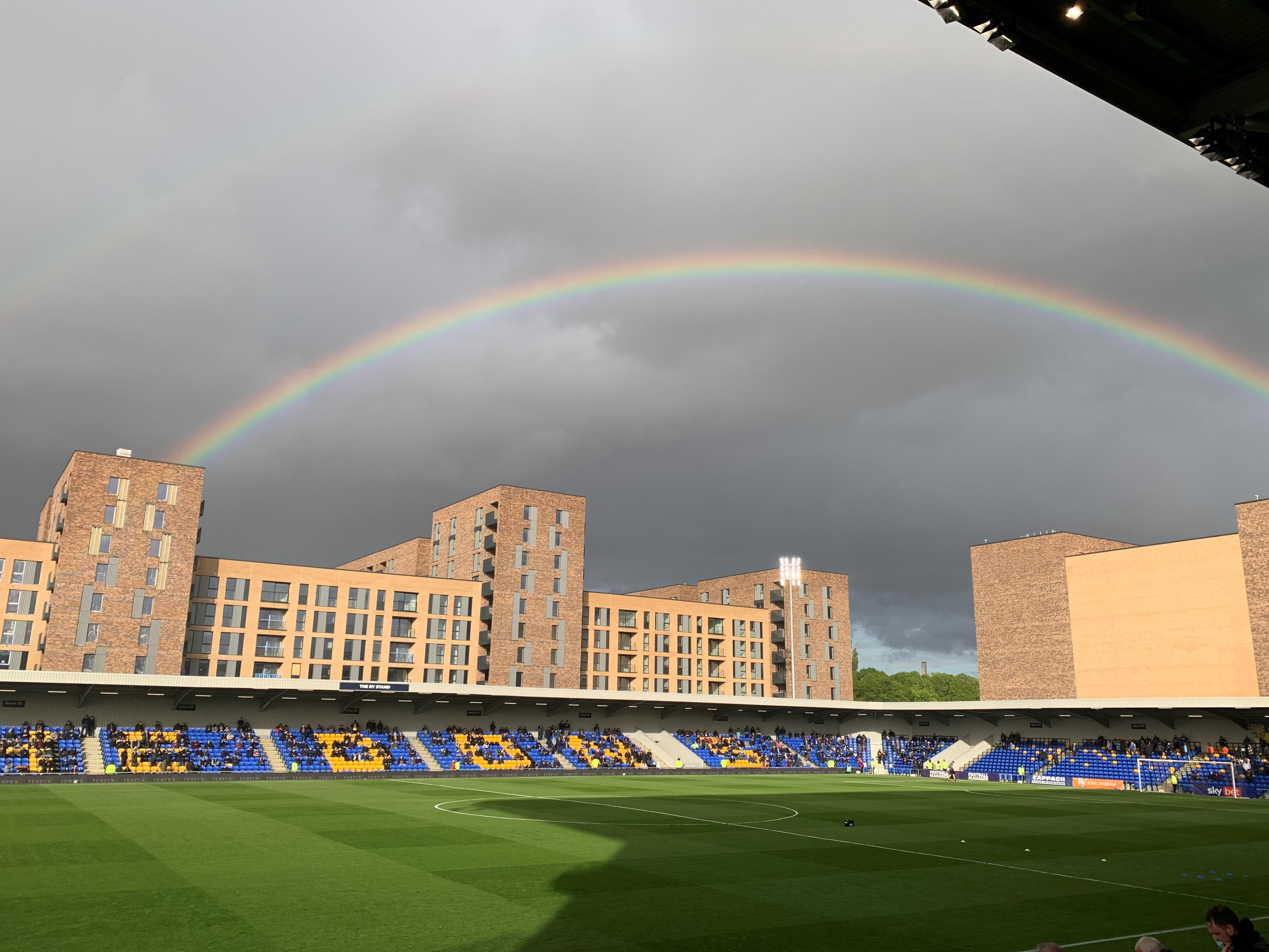
- Interactive map of Plough Lane
- Location: Plough Lane, Wimbledon
- Coordinates: 51°25′53″N 0°11′12″W
- Owner: AFC Wimbledon
- Operator: AFC Wimbledon
- Capacity: 9,215
- Public transit: Haydons Road; Earlsfield; Wimbledon; Wimbledon Park; Tooting Broadway

Construction
- Groundbreaking: 2019
- Opened: 3 November 2020
- Cost: £34 million
- Architect: KSS Design Group
- Builder: Buckingham Group

Tenants
- Football; AFC Wimbledon (2020–present); AFC Wimbledon Women (2021–present); Chelsea Women (selected matches, 2026–present); Rugby League; London Broncos (2022–present); American Football; London Warriors (2026–present)

Plough Lane, currently known as the Cherry Red Records Stadium for sponsorship reasons, is a multi-purpose football stadium in Wimbledon, south-west London, which has been the home of AFC Wimbledon since 3 November 2020. A groundshare with rugby league side London Broncos began in 2022.

== History ==
Wimbledon F.C. played its matches at the original Plough Lane stadium from 1912 until 1991. AFC Wimbledon's new stadium lies approximately 200 yards further east. After 1991 Wimbledon F.C. began a ground-share with Crystal Palace at Selhurst Park, with the intention of moving to a new all-seater stadium elsewhere at a later date due to the original Plough Lane stadium being considered unsuitable for conversion into a modern all-seater stadium. Numerous locations within and beyond the borders of Merton were considered for a possible new stadium, but none of these came to fruition, and in 2003 the original Wimbledon club controversially relocated 70 miles north to Milton Keynes and rebranded as Milton Keynes Dons.

In 2002 a phoenix club, AFC Wimbledon, was formed by the club's supporters after the Football Association gave Wimbledon F.C. permission to move to Milton Keynes. For the initial eighteen years of its existence, AFC Wimbledon played at Kingsmeadow Stadium, in the neighbouring London borough of Kingston.

Since its inception, AFC Wimbledon had stated that one of its primary aims was to return to Merton, with a new stadium close to what it regards as its "spiritual home" of the original Plough Lane. This aim formed the basis of a project to create a new purpose-built stadium on the site of the Wimbledon Greyhound Stadium, located approximately 200 yards from the original Plough Lane football stadium, where the original Wimbledon side played for 80 years.

Plans to develop the greyhound stadium site as either a multi-purpose stadium or as a football stadium were publicised frequently by the club and the media prior to 2013. In 2013 AFC Wimbledon announced that discussions were underway with Merton Council over a joint bid for the greyhound stadium and the surrounding land, in cooperation with developer Galliard Homes, to build a new football stadium, 600 residential properties and a range of community facilities.

=== Development ===
Construction proceeded with the permanent west stand initially, with main entry from the south off Plough Lane. This is a four-storey structure with general admission access from the first floor, and hospitality above. This structure seats 4,267 spectators; semi-permanent stands on the other three sides brings initial capacity to 9,215. Among the semi-permanent seating, the most vocal home fans will be in the south, which will include a safe standing area; a family area along the east; and away fans will be in the north stand, which is isolated with its own entry. A secondary entrance for home fans in the south and east stands is located on the easterly pedestrian-only street, Greyhound Parade.

The plans for the football stadium were approved unanimously by Merton Council on 10 December 2015. Clearance of the site in preparation for the new football stadium and housing was begun on 16 March 2018. The stadium's opening was initially planned for summer 2019, but did not take place until 3 November 2020. The land's freehold was transferred to an AFC Wimbledon subsidiary on 24 December 2018, among other transactions that also formally transferred ownership of Kingsmeadow to Chelsea.

==== Finances ====
The club thus purchased and cleared the site of the former Wimbledon Greyhound Stadium in anticipation of construction. In 2019 it was announced that a minimum of £2 million in crowdfunding would be needed to construct a scaled-down version of the original design with a single permanent stand and an initial capacity of 9,000; as of August 2019, the £2 million mark had been raised through Seedrs. In November 2019 it emerged that financing of a final £11m needed to complete the ground as envisioned was not forthcoming; the club's fan ownership initially considered scaling down the project, or accepting outside investment into the club by relinquishing ownership to meet the shortfall. However, alternative financing was quickly raised by club supporters by way of a bond issue which raised over £5 million. In May 2020, the final remaining financing needed to sign all construction contracts was confirmed following key investment from local businessman Nick Robertson.

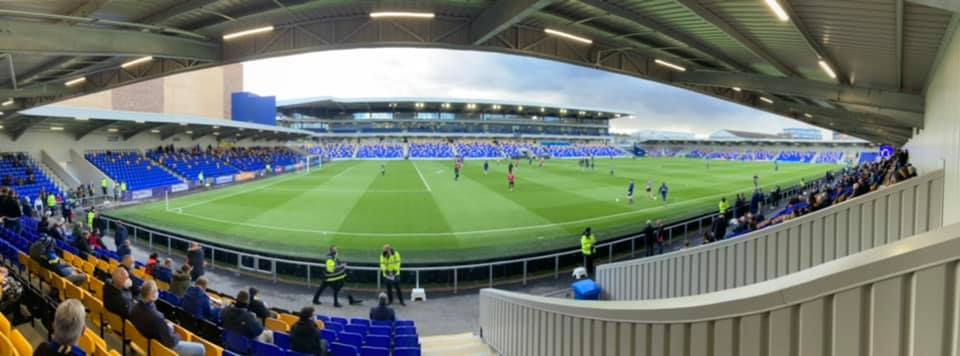
Panoramic view of the stadium from the south corner of the east stand, looking across to the west stand

=== Opening ===
AFC Wimbledon played their first match at the ground on 3 November 2020 against Doncaster Rovers – a 2–2 draw, with the first-ever goal at the new stadium scored by Wimbledon's Joe Pigott in the 18th minute of that match. No fans were able to attend, however, owing to national COVID-19 restrictions in effect at the time.

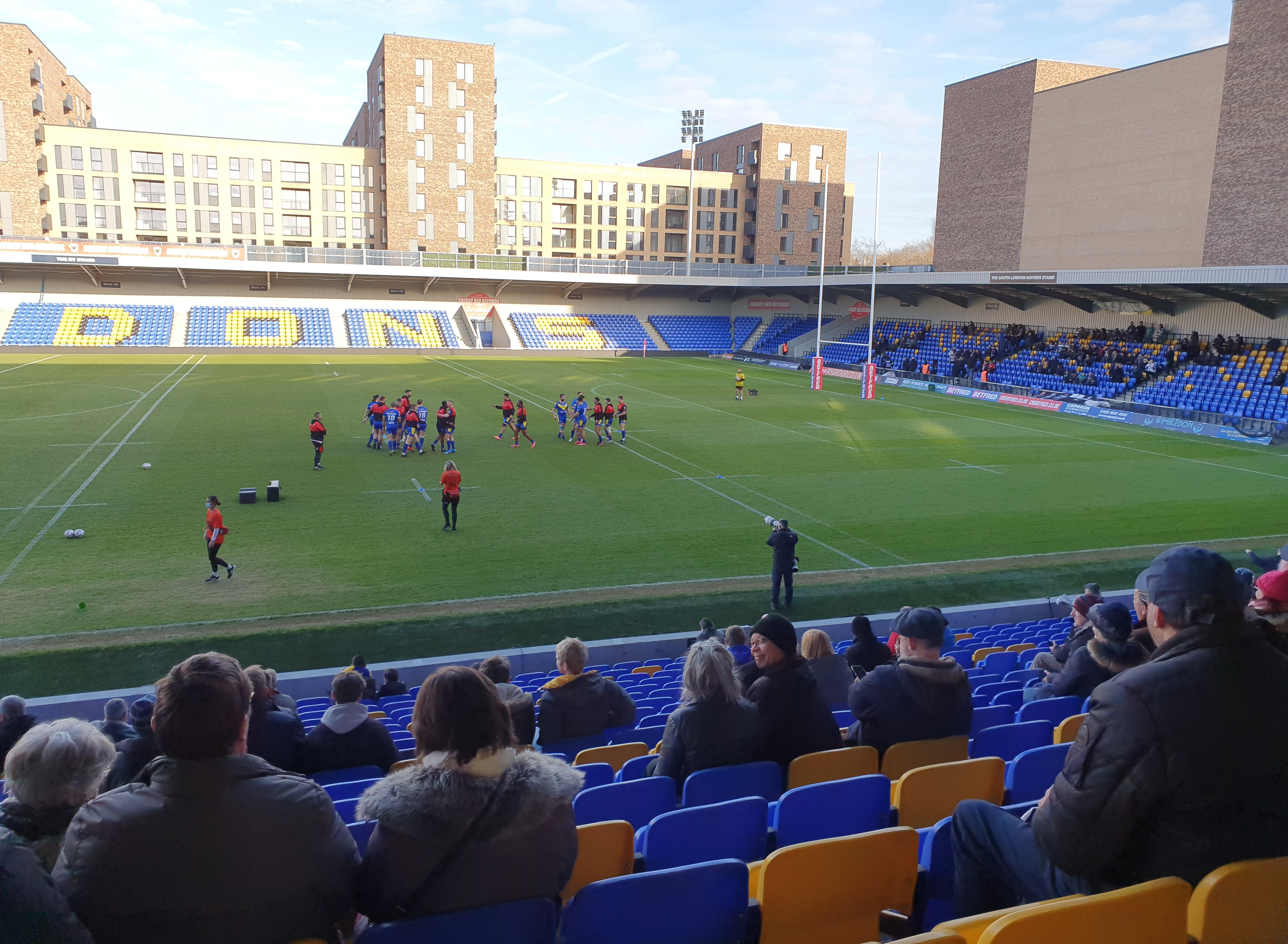
Plough Lane in rugby league configuration, as the London Broncos players are warming up

In December 2020, the Dons Trust announced that they were discussing a potential groundshare agreement with Rugby League side London Broncos. A vote by the Trust membership in March 2021 resulted in 91.7% of those voting in favour. It was subject to revised planning permission which had been opposed by a group of residents but these issues were resolved before the 2022 season.

On 25 March 2021, an NHS COVID-19 vaccination centre opened in the stadium's event space; some of the first to be vaccinated were club supporters.

The first game at the stadium with fans being able to attend was on 18 May 2021 when 2,000 people watched the Dons play Liverpool's under-23 side in a friendly match specifically intended to test the public safety standards of the new stadium. The first match to take place at the ground with a capacity crowd was AFC Wimbledon's 3–3 draw against Bolton Wanderers on 14 August 2021.

=== Recent history ===
On 16 September 2021, the club agreed a further three-year deal with their Kingsmeadow stadium sponsor Cherry Red Records and thus Plough Lane was renamed the Cherry Red Records Stadium.

On 21 October 2021, AFC Wimbledon Women played their first game at the stadium winning 7–1 in the Women's FA Cup against Walton Casuals in front of a record crowd.

On 30 January 2022, the London Broncos played their first match at Plough Lane against the Widnes Vikings.

On 5 March 2022, Plough Lane hosted the FA Women's Continental League Cup Final between Chelsea Women and Manchester City Women.

In 2024, FourFourTwo named Plough Lane the 42nd best stadium in world football.

In September 2024, after the River Wandle burst its banks, AFC Wimbledon's EFL Cup third round tie against Newcastle United had to be rescheduled from 24 September to 1 October 2024, and moved to Newcastle's St James' Park, due to flood damage to the Plough Lane pitch. Newcastle United donated £15,000 to the social media funding appeal to fix the damaged stadium. In the rearranged fixture, Wimbledon also received a big percentage of the gate receipts of the capacity crowd. Following the match, Wimbledon made an offer of a summer friendly at Plough Lane to Newcastle United. Two other home fixtures (against Accrington Stanley and Crewe Alexandra) also had to be rearranged.

The record attendance at Plough Lane of 8,737 was set on 18 April 2026 in a 3–1 League One defeat to Plymouth Argyle. The record for a cup game was 8,595 on 6 January 2024 for an FA Cup third round match against Ipswich Town.

On 24 May 2026, the stadium hosted its first American Football match as the London Warriors played against Panthers Wrocław in the opening week of the debut season in the newly formed AFLE.

Ahead of 2026–27 season, Plough Lane would host the domestic cup matches and UEFA Women's Champions League league phase matches of Chelsea Women.

== Sponsorship and stands ==
The stadium as a whole has been sponsored by Cherry Red Records since 16 September 2021; the company had previously been stadium sponsors at Kingsmeadow.

Current sponsors for the various parts of the stadium are:

- The Togglit Stand – The north, away, stand, 1,465 capacity, all-seating.
- The Ry Stand – The east stand, 2,391 capacity, all-seating.
- The Paul Strank Stand – The south, home-supporters' stand, 1,092 capacity, rail seating terrace.
- The Cappagh Stand – The west, or main, stand, 4,267 capacity, all-seating.

== Expansion ==
The ground has planning permission to be expanded to 20,000 spectators.

== AFC Wimbledon league attendances ==
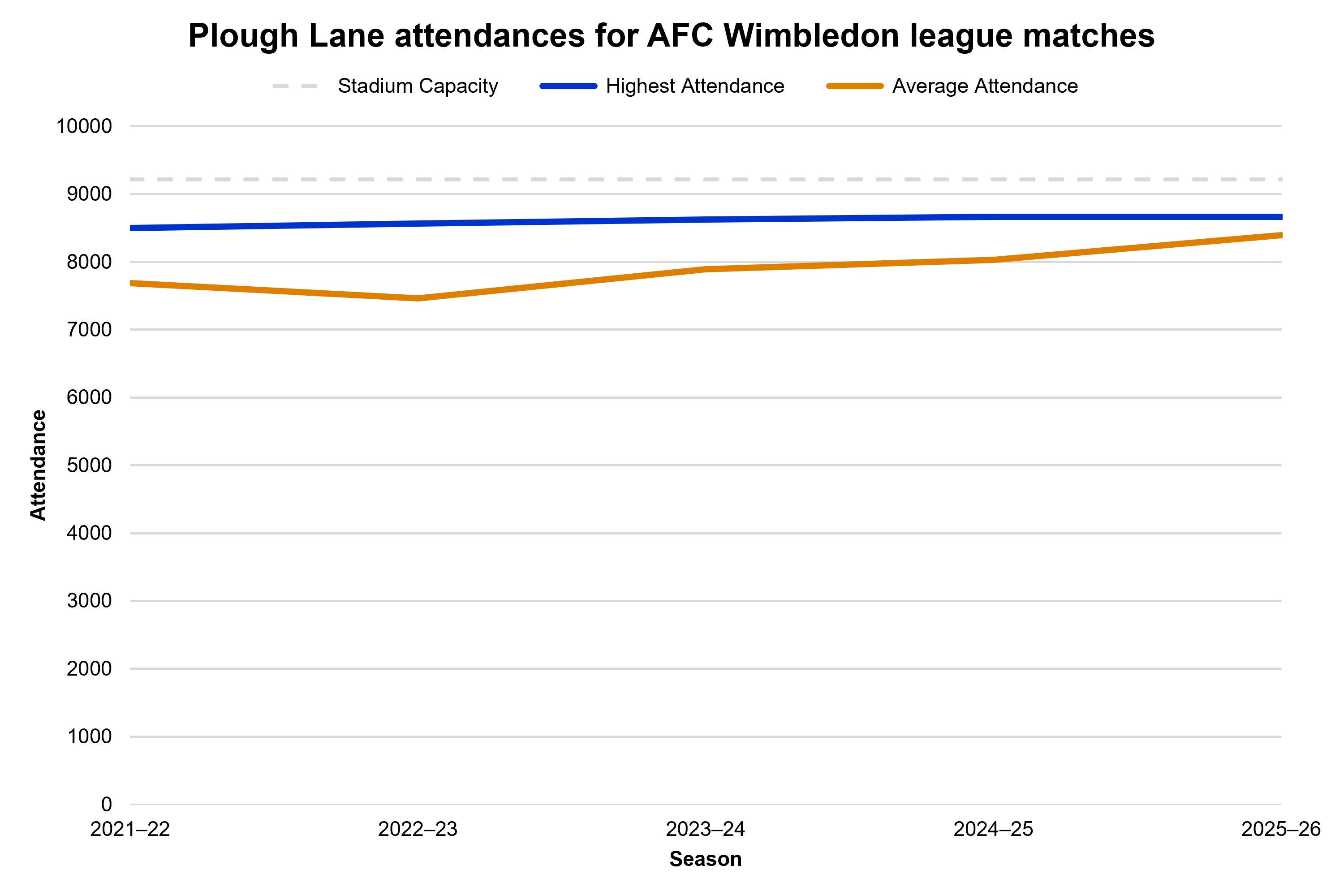
Evolution of AFC Wimbledon absolute league attendances

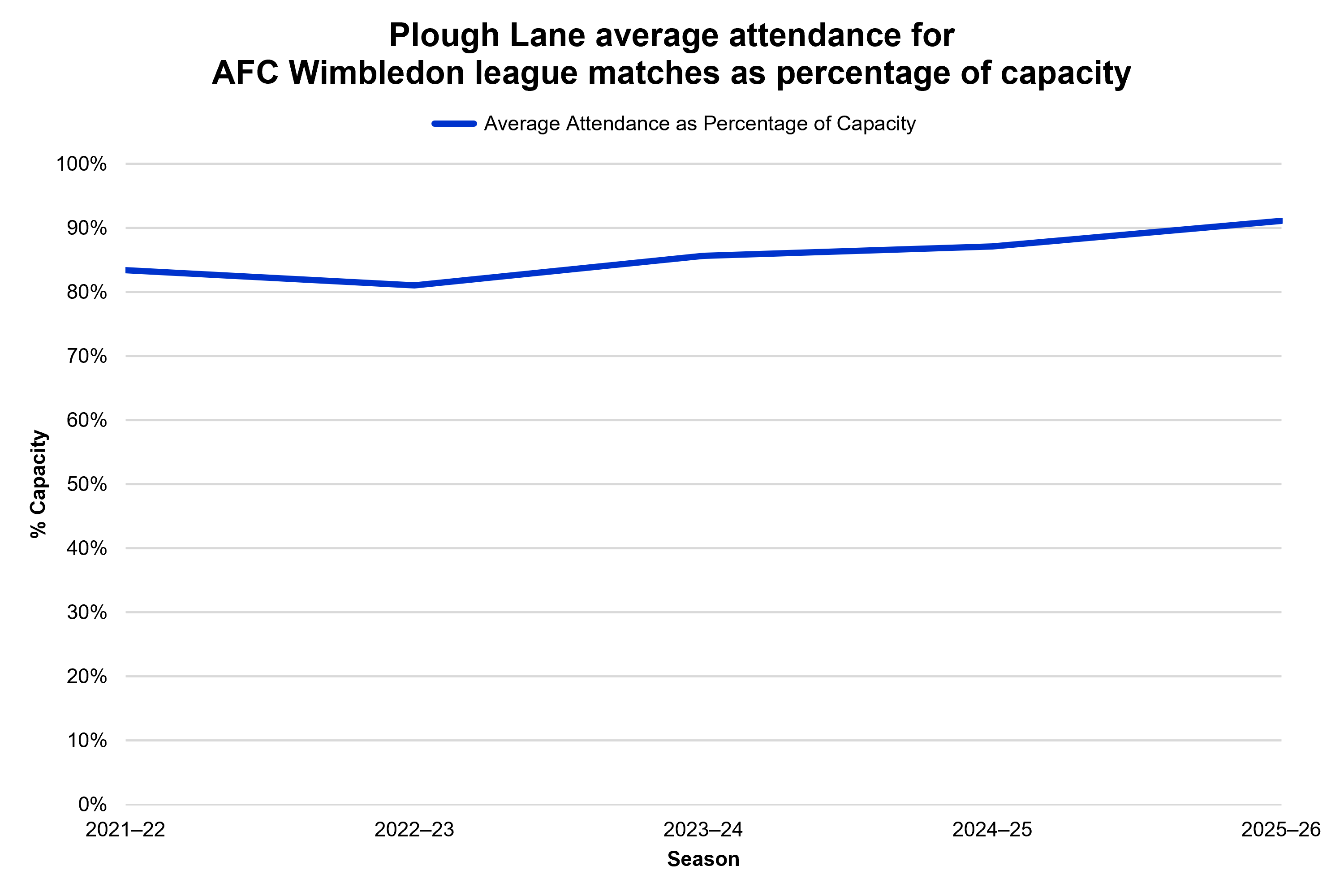
Evolution of AFC Wimbledon average league attendances as a percentage of capacity

Season	League	Stadium capacity	Highest attendance	Average attendance	% of capacity
2020–21	EFL League One	9,215	No fans allowed due to COVID-19		
2021–22	EFL League One	9,215	8,502	7,687	83.4%
2022–23	EFL League Two	9,215	8,568	7,461	81.0%
2023–24	EFL League Two	9,215	8,623	7,892	85.6%
2024–25	EFL League Two	9,215	8,664	8,028	87.1%
2025–26	EFL League One	9,215	8,664	8,393	91.1%
