= American Football League Europe =

Professional American football league

- Most recent season or competition: 2026 American Football League Europe season
- Sport: American football
- Founded: 2 December 2025; 11 months ago
- First season: 2026
- Owner: American Football League Europe LLC
- CEO: Joel Nagel
- COO: Moritz Heisler
- President: Jim Tomsula
- Commissioner: Andreas Nommensen
- No. of teams: 11
- Countries: Germany; Austria; Switzerland; France; Poland; Italy; United Kingdom; Denmark
- Headquarters: Hamburg, Germany
- Continent: Europe
- Most recent champion: (Austria) Vienna Vikings (2026)
- Broadcasters: Sport1 (Germany, Austria, Switzerland); Krone TV (Austria); Polsat Sport (Poland); Red Bull TV (Worldwide); Sport en France (France) Swiss Sport (Switzerland) AXS TV (USA)
- Streaming partner: AFLE+
- Website: www.aflepro.com

The American Football League Europe, abbreviated as AFLE and also referred to as The League Europe, is a professional American football league in Europe. It was founded in December 2025 and began competition on 23 May 2026.

== History ==
=== Background ===
After the 2025 season, several teams left the European League of Football (ELF), established in 2020. Tensions reportedly grew between several franchises and the league's central leadership over governance, financial transparency, and long-term strategic direction.

Among the main concerns raised by clubs were allegations of limited transparency in league operations and dissatisfaction regarding the distribution of commercial revenues. Some organizations argued that participating teams were not receiving adequate revenue shares relative to their sporting and operational contributions.

As a result, several former and current ELF-linked organizations began discussions in 2025 about creating an alternative pan-European competition. These talks led to the formation of the European Football Alliance (EFA), a project intended to unite several clubs under a new organizational model.

==== Split from the European Football Alliance ====
Despite the initial momentum behind the EFA project, participating teams were unable to reach a full agreement on the structure and governance of the proposed competition.

One group of clubs favored a decentralized, team-led league in which member organizations would collectively manage the competition and hold primary decision-making authority. Those clubs later continued under the EFA banner and announced plans for the 2026 EFA season.

Another group supported the creation of a professionally managed league backed by external investment. Proponents of that model argued that centralized management and access to private capital would provide stronger long-term stability, commercial growth, and the resources necessary to expand the sport across Europe.

The differing visions ultimately resulted in a formal split, with the investor-backed faction moving forward independently.

==== Foundation of AFLE ====
The American Football League Europe (AFLE) was publicly presented on 2 December 2025 as a new professional American football league for Europe. The organization announced plans to launch competition in 2026 with a mixture of established clubs and expansion markets.

AFLE positioned itself as a modern league focused on professional standards, commercial development, digital media growth, and a continent-wide footprint. League officials stated that the new structure was intended to provide greater organizational clarity and a more sustainable long-term model than previous European ventures.

=== Inaugural season ===
The league announced that its inaugural season would begin on 23 May 2026, with Berlin Thunder scheduled to face the Vienna Vikings in the opening game.

The first championship game, branded as the Gold Bowl, is scheduled to be played on 6 September 2026 at Schauinsland-Reisen-Arena in Duisburg concluding the league's debut campaign.

== Ownership and administration ==
The American Football League Europe LLC is headquartered in Casper, Wyoming, United States. The league is owned by a United States-based family office, although the identities of the families involved have not been publicly disclosed.

AFLE also maintains a league office in Hamburg, Germany, which serves as its principal European operational center.

Its European corporate structure includes AFLE Betriebs GmbH, a company wholly owned by Venture FOMO GmbH, based in Vienna, Austria. Venture FOMO GmbH is wholly owned by Robin Lumsden, who is also the majority shareholder of the Vienna Vikings franchise.

== Teams ==
American Football League Europe (Europe)
Locations of AFLE teams competing in 2026, and announced 2027 expansion locations.

On 6 December 2025, Rhein Fire, the two-time ELF champion, became the first team to announce its participation in the league. For the inaugural 2026 season, the league fielded eight teams. In addition to Rhein Fire, the participating teams were Berlin Thunder, Panthers Wrocław and the Vienna Vikings,, all of which previously competed in the ELF. Newly founded teams were the Alpine Rams , the Paris Lights and the Firenze Red Lions.. Finally, the London Warriors from the BAFA National Leagues Premier Division South joined the league on 6 May 2026. The league has also announced an expansion team from Monaco for 2027.

On 5 September 2026, the Warsaw Eagles, one of Poland's most successful American football clubs, were confirmed as the league's ninth franchise for the 2027 season. Following this, on 4 November 2026, the AFLE announced that Guelfi Firenze would join the league for the 2027 season, taking over the vacant spot left by the Firenze Red Lions, who left the league. The Red Lions released a statement confirming this, although expressing "profound disappointment" in the handling and communication of the situation by the league. A day later, the league announced that Hamburg, the city of the league's headquarters, would receive their own team debuting in 2027, with the name and logo being chosen in an open competition. Later that day, the 2026 EFA champions Nordic Storm officially announced their intentions to move on from the European Football Alliance and join the AFLE for the 2027 season.

Teams	Location	Stadium	Capacity	Head Coach	2026
North/West Division
Alpine Rams	(Switzerland) Biel/Bienne	Tissot Arena	5,200	(United States) Joshua Fitzgerald	3–9
London Warriors	(United Kingdom) London	Cherry Red Records Stadium	9,215	(United Kingdom) Tony Allen	6–6, Semi-finals game
Paris Lights	(France) Paris	Vélodrome Jacques-Anquetil	7,151	(United States) David Shelton	3–9
Rhein Fire	(Germany) Düsseldorf/Duisburg	Schauinsland-Reisen-Arena	31,500	(United States) Mark Ridgley	10–2, Semi-finals game
South/East Division
Berlin Football Team	(Germany) Berlin	Friedrich-Ludwig-Jahn-Sportpark, Kleines Stadion	2,000	(United States) John Shannon	5–7
Vienna Vikings	(Austria) Vienna	Wiener Sport-Club Stadium	5,600	(United States) Jordan Neuman	11–1, won Gold Bowl
Panthers Wrocław	(Poland) Wrocław	Olympic Stadium	11,000	(United States) Dave Likins	10–2, lost Gold Bowl
2027 expansion teams
Warsaw Eagles	(Poland) Warsaw	TBA		(United States) Deante Battle	PFL, 8–0, won Polish Bowl
Guelfi Firenze	(Italy) Florence	Guelfi Sports Center	1,000		IFL, 8–0, won Italian Bowl
Hamburg Football Team	(Germany) Hamburg	TBA		(United States) Marcus Herford	new
Nordic Storm	(Denmark) Copenhagen	Gladsaxe Stadium	13,507		EFA, 9–1, won EFA Championship Game
Monaco Football Team	Monaco	TBA		TBA	

=== Former teams ===
Former teams in the American Football League Europe
Team	City	Joined	Final season	Fate
Firenze Red Lions	(Italy) Florence	2026	2026	Folded

== Rules ==
The AFLE operates under a set of rules and regulations governing gameplay, player eligibility, roster composition and competition structure. The league maintains an official rulebook and a dedicated officiating department.

=== Rosters ===
Each team may have a maximum roster of 65 players, with an active roster of 53 players. The game-day roster is limited to 48 players, with two additional places available for Homegrown players under the age of 21.

The AFLE roster system is designed to promote competitive balance while providing opportunities for both domestic and international players. Players are classified into four categories: Homegrown (HG), A-Players, I-Players and E-Players.

Homegrown (HG) players are players whose first organized tackle football experience was within the team's assigned Homegrown country or region and who have played at least two seasons of organized tackle football there. A-Players are players whose first organized tackle football experience was in the United States and who have played at least two consecutive seasons within a recognized U.S. tackle football structure. Each team may have up to four A-Players. I-Players are players whose first organized tackle football experience was in Canada, Mexico or Japan and who have played at least two seasons within the respective national tackle football system. Each team may have one I-Player. E-Players are players whose first organized tackle football experience was outside the United States, Canada, Mexico, Japan and the team's assigned Homegrown region, with a minimum of two seasons in an organized tackle football structure. Each team may have up to nine E-Players.

=== Season structure ===
The AFLE regular season consists of 16 weeks of competition, with each team playing 12 regular-season games. The league is divided into two conferences of four teams each: the North/West Conference and the South/East Conference.

Each team plays its three conference opponents twice, once at home and once away, for six intra-conference games. Each team also plays each team from the other conference at least once, with two inter-conference opponents played twice, resulting in six inter-conference games.

Four teams qualify for the playoffs. The two conference champions are awarded the No. 1 and No. 2 seeds, while the two best remaining teams in the league receive the No. 3 and No. 4 seeds. The No. 1 seed hosts the No. 4 seed and the No. 2 seed hosts the No. 3 seed in the semifinals. Both semifinal games are single-elimination games.

The final is also a single game. Home-field advantage is awarded to the semifinal winner with the better regular-season record.

=== Tiebreakers ===
The AFLE uses separate tiebreaking procedures for conference standings and overall playoff seeding. Conference standings are determined in the following order: number of wins, conference winning percentage, head-to-head record, strength of victory, strength of schedule, head-to-head point differential, points scored in away head-to-head games, total point differential, total points scored, points scored in away games, and finally a coin toss.

For league-wide playoff seeding, the tiebreakers are number of wins, head-to-head record where applicable, strength of victory, strength of schedule, head-to-head point differential where applicable, points scored in away head-to-head games where applicable, total point differential, total points scored, points scored in away games, and finally a coin toss.

For point-differential tiebreakers, the maximum differential counted is 35 points per game.

== Broadcasting and media coverage ==
All games of the AFLE season are available through the AFLE+ Game Pass, the league's official streaming service.

In Germany, games are broadcast by Sport1. In the German-speaking market (DACH), selected games are also available on Krone TV in Austria. In Poland, selected games are broadcast by Polsat Sport, while games in France are broadcast by Sport en France.

Red Bull TV provides international coverage of games involving the Vienna Vikings, making these games available to viewers worldwide.

On 3 August 2026, the AFLE announced an agreement with Swiss Sport for the broadcast of selected games in Switzerland. On 28 August 2026, the American television network AXS TV announced an agreement with the league to broadcast the AFLE semi-finals and final in the United States.
