= List of European League of Football stadiums =

The following is a list of stadiums in the European League of Football, containing all venues of ELF games, including one-off and other temporary venues, venues of championship games and the 2021 All-Star Game.

Image	Stadium	Capacity	City	Country	Playing surface	Roof type	Team	Opened	ELF from	ELF until	Reason
	Estadi Municipal	4,700	Barcelona	Spain	Natural grass	Open	Barcelona Dragons	1977	2021	2022	Moved to Estadi Olímpic de Terrassa
	Amateurstadion	5,400	Berlin	Germany	Natural grass	Open	Berlin Thunder	2004	2021	2021	Used temporarily
	Friedrich-Ludwig-Jahn-Sportpark (Großes Stadion)	19,708	Berlin	Germany	Natural grass	Open	Berlin Thunder	1952	2021	2024	Demolished
	Südstadion	11,748	Cologne	Germany	Natural grass	Open	Cologne Centurions	1979	2021	2025	Franchise and ELF folded
	Ostkampfbahn	333	Cologne	Germany	Artificial turf	Open	Cologne Centurions	1923	2021	2021	Used temporarily
	PSD Bank Arena	12,542	Frankfurt	Germany	Natural grass	Open	Frankfurt Galaxy	1931	2021	2025	ELF folded
	Stadion Hoheluft	11,000	Hamburg	Germany	Natural grass	Open	Hamburg Sea Devils	1907	2021	2025	Franchise and ELF folded
	Alfred-Kunze-Sportpark	4,999	Leipzig	Germany	Natural grass	Open	Leipzig Kings	1915	2021	2022	Moved to Bruno-Plache-Stadion
	Gazi-Stadion auf der Waldau	11,410	Stuttgart	Germany	Natural grass	Open	Stuttgart Surge	1905	2021	2025	Franchise and ELF folded
	Stadion Olimpijski	11,000	Wrocław	Poland	Artificial turf	Open	Wrocław Panthers	1928	2021	2025	ELF folded
	Merkur Spiel-Arena	54,600	Düsseldorf	Germany	Natural grass	Retractable	Rhein Fire	2004	2021	2025	2021 Championship Game, Used temporarily
	Maltepe Hasan Polat Stadyumu	5,000	Istanbul	Turkey	Natural grass	Open	Istanbul Rams	1988	2022	2022	Left ELF
	Bruno-Plache-Stadion	12,300	Leipzig	Germany	Natural grass	Open	Leipzig Kings	1920	2022	2023	Franchise folded
	Paul-Greifzu-Stadion	20,000	Dessau-Roßlau	Germany	Natural grass	Open	Leipzig Kings	1952	2022	2022	Used temporarily
	Leuna-Chemie-Stadion	15,057	Halle (Saale)	Germany	Natural grass	Open	Leipzig Kings	2011	2022	2022	Used temporarily
	Schauinsland-Reisen-Arena	31,514	Duisburg	Germany	Natural grass	Open	Rhein Fire	2004	2022	2025	Left ELF
	Tivoli Stadion Tirol	16,008	Innsbruck	Austria	Natural grass	Open	Raiders Tirol	2000	2022	2025	Left ELF
	Generali Arena	17,500	Vienna	Austria	Natural grass	Open	Vienna Vikings	1925	2022	2025	Left ELF
	28 Black Arena	32,000	Klagenfurt am Wörthersee	Austria	Natural grass	Open		2007	2022	2022	2022 Championship Game
	Estadi Olímpic de Terrassa	11,500	Terrassa	Spain	Natural grass	Open	Barcelona Dragons	1955	2023	2023	Moved to Estadi Municipal de Badalona
	Sportpark Höhenberg	8,343	Cologne	Germany	Natural grass	Open	Cologne Centurions	1931	2023	2023	Used temporarily
	First Field	3,500	Székesfehérvár	Hungary	Natural grass	Open	Fehérvár Enthroners	2016	2023	2025	Left ELF
	Volksparkstadion	57,000	Hamburg	Germany	Natural grass	Open	Hamburg Sea Devils	1953	2023	2025	Used temporarily
	Lidl Arena	6,048	Wil	Switzerland	Artificial turf	Open	Helvetic Guards, Helvetic Mercenaries	1963	2023	2025	Franchises and ELF folded
	Velodromo Vigorelli	9,000	Milan	Italy	Artificial turf	Open	Milano Seamen	1935	2023	2024	Left ELF
	Uhlsport Park	15,053	Unterhaching	Germany	Hybrid grass	Open	Munich Ravens	1992	2023	2025	Left ELF
	Stade Jean-Bouin	19,904	Paris	France	Artificial turf	Open	Paris Musketeers	1925	2023	2024	Moved to Stade Robert Bobin
	Stadion FK Viktoria Žižkov	3,327	Prague	Czech Republic	Natural grass	Open	Prague Lions	1952	2023	2025	Left ELF
	Atletický stadion Slavia Praha	3,000	Prague	Czech Republic	Natural grass	Open	Prague Lions		2023	2024	Moved to Stadion FK Viktoria Žižkov
	Sportovní centrum Hostivař	3,000	Prague	Czech Republic	Natural grass	Open	Prague Lions		2023	2023	Used temporarily
	Football-Zentrum Ravelin	1,200	Vienna	Austria	Artificial turf	Open	Vienna Vikings	2007	2023	2023	Used temporarily
	Stadion Hohe Warte	5,500	Vienna	Austria	Natural grass	Open	Vienna Vikings	1921	2023	2025	Moved to Generali Arena
	Estadi Municipal de Badalona	4,170	Badalona	Spain	Artificial turf	Open	Barcelona Dragons	2017	2024	2024	Franchise folded
	Tivoli	32,960	Aachen	Germany	Natural grass	Open	Cologne Centurions	2009	2024	2024	Used temporarily
	Stadion am Bieberer Berg	20,500	Offenbach am Main	Germany	Natural grass	Open	Frankfurt Galaxy	2012	2024	2025	Used temporarily
	Weserstadion	42,100	Bremen	Germany	Natural grass	Open	Hamburg Sea Devils	1947	2024	2025	Used temporarily
	Eilenriedestadion	5,001	Hannover	Germany	Natural grass	Open	Hamburg Sea Devils	1922	2024	2024	Used temporarily
	Heinz von Heiden Arena	49,000	Hannover	Germany	Natural grass	Open	Hamburg Sea Devils	1952	2024	2024	Used temporarily
	Stadion Lohmühle	17,849	Lübeck	Germany	Natural grass	Open	Hamburg Sea Devils	1924	2024	2024	Used temporarily
	Stadion Šubićevac	3,412	Šibenik	Croatia	Natural grass	Open	Hamburg Sea Devils	1948	2024	2024	Used temporarily
	Stadion Brühl	10,964	Grenchen	Switzerland	Natural grass	Open	Helvetic Mercenaries	1927	2024	2024	Used temporarily
	Sportzentrum Kleinfeld	3,500	Kriens	Switzerland	Artificial turf	Open	Helvetic Mercenaries	2018	2024	2024	Moved to Lidl Arena
	Estadio de Vallehermoso	9,000	Madrid	Spain	Natural grass	Open	Madrid Bravos	2009	2024	2025	Franchise and ELF folded
	Max-Morlock-Stadion	50,000	Nuremberg	Germany	Natural grass	Open	Munich Ravens	1928	2024	2024	Used temporarily
	Stade du Hainaut	25,172	Valenciennes	France	Hybrid grass	Open	Paris Musketeers	2008	2024	2024	Used temporarily
	Městský stadion	4,000	Ústí nad Labem	Czech Republic	Natural grass	Open	Prague Lions	1945	2024	2024	Used temporarily
	Niederrheinstadion	21,318	Oberhausen	Germany	Natural grass	Open	Rhein Fire	1924	2024	2024	Used temporarily
	Stadion an der Kreuzeiche	15,228	Reutlingen	Germany	Natural grass	Open	Stuttgart Surge	1953	2024	2024	Used temporarily
	PreZero Arena	30,150	Sinsheim	Germany	Natural grass	Open	Stuttgart Surge	2009	2024	2024	Used temporarily
	Wiener Neustadt Ergo Arena	4,000	Wiener Neustadt	Austria	Natural grass	Open	Vienna Vikings	2019	2024	2025	Left ELF
	Tarczyński Arena	42,771	Wrocław	Poland	Natural grass	Open	Panthers Wrocław	2011	2024	2024	Used temporarily
	Veltins-Arena	62,271	Gelsenkirchen	Germany	Natural grass	Retractable		2001	2024	2024	2024 Championship Game
	Preussenstadion	3,000	Berlin	Germany	Natural grass	Open	Berlin Tunder	1938	2025	2025	Left ELF
	Sportpark Eimsbüttel	2,018	Hamburg	Germany	Natural grass	Open	Hamburg Sea Devils	1931	2025	2025	Used temporarily
	Gladsaxe Stadion	13,507	Søborg	Denmark	Natural grass	Open	Nordic Storm	1940	2025	2025	Left ELF
	Stade Robert Bobin	18,850	Bondoufle	France	Natural grass	Open	Paris Musketeers	1994	2025	2025	Left ELF
	Datenpol Arena	10,600	Maria Enzersdorf	Austria	Natural grass	Open	Vienna Vikings	1965	2025	2025	Used temporarily
	MHPArena	60,058	Stuttgart	Germany	Natural grass	Open		1933	2025	2025	2025 Championship Game

== See also ==
- List of current National Football League stadiums
- List of Canadian Football League stadiums
