= 2023 European League of Football season =

2023 ELF season
- League: European League of Football
- Sport: American Football
- Duration: June 3, 2023 – September 24, 2023
- Games: 94 + 5 playoff games
- Teams: 17
- Total attendance: 428,631
- Season MVP: Jadrian Clark (Rhein Fire)

Conference Champions
- Western Conference champions: (Germany) Rhein Fire
- Central Conference champions: (Germany) Stuttgart Surge
- Eastern Conference champions: (Austria) Vienna Vikings

2023 Championship Game
- Date: September 24, 2023
- Venue: Schauinsland-Reisen-Arena, Duisburg
- Champions: (Germany) Rhein Fire (1st title)
- Finals MVP: Jadrian Clark (Rhein Fire)

Seasons
- 2022 2024

The 2023 ELF season was the third season of the European League of Football, a professional American football league based in Europe. Seventeen teams from nine countries participated. The season started on June 3, 2024, and concluded with the ELF Championship Game at Schauinsland-Reisen-Arena Duisburg, Germany on September 24, 2023. Rhein Fire won the title, beating Stuttgart Surge 53-34.

Location of ELF teams
- Western Conference
- Central Conference
- Eastern Conference

== Format ==
The teams are divided into three conferences of 5 or 6 teams. Each team plays 12 games during the regular season. The winner of each conference, as well as the next best 3 teams, regardless of conference, qualify for the playoffs.

== Teams ==
11 of the 12 teams from the 2022 season are competing in 2023, and are joined by 6 new expansion teams: Fehérvár Enthroners, Helvetic Guards, Milano Seamen, Munich Ravens, Paris Musketeers and Prague Lions. The only team not returning for the new season is the Istanbul Rams.

The Leipzig Kings were removed from the league after week 6. This came after a two week saga, which included the Kings suggesting they will "most likely have to stop competing in the European League of Football" after their loan requested was denied by the league and cancelling the week 6 home match with Prague Lions. The Kings would later announce their withdrawal from the league on July 11, 2023. A day later the ELF announced that the Kings will be taken out of the league for the remainder of the 2023 season and their license to participate in the European League of Football was "withdrawn", but would like to accept the team back for the 2024 season, if a suitable new owners will be found.

Team	City	Conference	Stadium	Capacity	Head coach
Barcelona Dragons	(Spain) Barcelona/Terrassa	Central	Estadi Olímpic de Terrassa	11,500	(Mexico) Gabriel Sánchez
Berlin Thunder	(Germany) Berlin	Eastern	Friedrich-Ludwig-Jahn-Sportpark	19,708	(Germany) Johnny Schmuck
Cologne Centurions	(Germany) Cologne	Western	Südstadion	11,748	(Greece) Christos Lambropoulos
Cologne Centurions	(Germany) Cologne	Western	Sportpark Höhenberg (Note: Two home game)	8,343	(Greece) Christos Lambropoulos
Fehérvár Enthroners	(Hungary) Székesfehérvár	Eastern	First Field	3,500	(United States) Jaime Hill
Frankfurt Galaxy	(Germany) Frankfurt am Main	Western	PSD Bank Arena	12,542	(Germany) Thomas Kösling
Hamburg Sea Devils	(Germany) Hamburg	Western	Stadion Hoheluft	11,000	(United States) Charles "Yogi" Jones
Hamburg Sea Devils	(Germany) Hamburg	Western	Volksparkstadion (Note: First home game of the season)	57,000	(United States) Charles "Yogi" Jones
Helvetic Guards	(Switzerland) Zurich/Wil	Central	Lidl Arena Wil	6,048	(United States) Norm Chow
Milano Seamen	(Italy) Milan	Central	Velodromo Maspes-Vigorelli	7,500	(Austria) Stefan Pokorny
Munich Ravens	(Germany) Munich/Unterhaching	Central	Alpenbauer Sportpark	15,053	(United States) John Shoop
Leipzig Kings (Note: Leipzig Kings were removed from the league after week 6)	(Germany) Leipzig	Eastern	Bruno-Plache-Stadion	12,321	(United States) John Booker
Panthers Wrocław	(Poland) Wrocław	Eastern	Stadion Olimpijski	11,000	(United States) Dave Christensen
Paris Musketeers	(France) Paris	Western	Stade Jean-Bouin	20,000	(United States) Marc Mattioli
Prague Lions	(Czech Republic) Prague	Eastern	Stadion FK Viktoria Žižkov	5,037	(United States) Dan Disch
Prague Lions	(Czech Republic) Prague	Eastern	Sportovní centrum Hostivař (Note: One game)	3,000	(United States) Dan Disch
Prague Lions	(Czech Republic) Prague	Eastern	Atletický stadion Slavia Praha (Note: One game)	3,000	(United States) Dan Disch
Raiders Tirol	(Austria) Innsbruck	Central	Tivoli Stadion Tirol	16,008	(United States) Kevin Herron
Rhein Fire	(Germany) Düsseldorf/Duisburg	Western	Schauinsland-Reisen-Arena	31,514	(United States) Jim Tomsula
Stuttgart Surge	(Germany) Stuttgart	Central	Gazi-Stadion auf der Waldau	11,408	(United States) Jordan Neuman
Vienna Vikings	(Austria) Vienna	Eastern	Hohe Warte Stadium	5,500	(United States) Chris Calaycay
Vienna Vikings	(Austria) Vienna	Eastern	Generali Arena (Note: First home game of the season, one playoff game)	17,500	(United States) Chris Calaycay
Vienna Vikings	(Austria) Vienna	Eastern	Football-Zentrum Ravelin (Note: Last home game of the season)	1,200	(United States) Chris Calaycay

=== Rosters ===
Like last season, there is a limit of 4 non-European foreign players per roster, and two on the field at the same time. Players who are dual citizens of the U.S. and an EU-member country are not counted towards that limit in keeping with the Bosman ruling. There is also a limit of 6 European foreigners per roster, down from 8 the previous season. Brazilian players do not count towards the import quota. For the 2023 season, the active rosters consist of 53 players, the gameday rosters of 46 players, while the practice squad was increased to 12 players.

=== Coaching changes ===
Team	Outgoing coach	Manner of departure	Notes	Date of vacancy	Incoming coach	Date of appointment	Source
Cologne Centurions	(Germany) Frank Roser	Resigned		September 7, 2022	(United States) Kahlil Carter	October 11, 2022	
Barcelona Dragons	(United States) Andrew Weidinger	Mutual agreement	Signed with Rhein Fire as OC	September 13, 2022	(Mexico) Gabriel Sánchez	September 15, 2022	
Panthers Wrocław	(Poland) Jakub Samel	Resigned	Stayed with team as sports director	September 20, 2022	(United States) Dave Christensen	November 18, 2022	
Leipzig Kings	(United States) Fred Armstrong	Fired		September 21, 2022	(United States) John Booker	September 28, 2022	
Cologne Centurions	(United States) Kahlil Carter	Resigned		March 17, 2023	(Greece) Christos Lambropoulos (interim)	March 17, 2023	
Prague Lions	(United States) Zach Harrod	Resigned		July 27, 2023	(United States) Dan Disch	July 29, 2023	

== Regular season ==
=== Schedule ===
The schedule for the 2023 season was released on January 27, 2023 without any specific times and venues. In Week 10, all teams are on bye due to the 2023 European Championship of American football.

==== Week 1 ====
Date/Time (CEST)	Conf.	Away team	Result	Home team	Venue	Attendance	Free TV	Viewers	Ref
Sat, 3. June	Eastern	Berlin Thunder	36 – 3	Féhervár Enthroners	First Field	1,800	Network4, More Than Sports TV		
Sat, 3. June	Central	Helvetic Guards	17 – 29	Barcelona Dragons	Estadi Olímpic de Terrassa	1,428			
Sat, 3. June	Western	Paris Musketeers	24 – 17	Cologne Centurions	Südstadion	2,560			
Sat, 3. June	IC	Hamburg Sea Devils	25 – 34	Panthers Wrocław	Stadion Olimpijski	2,850	Polsat, ran.de		
Sun, 4. June	Western	Frankfurt Galaxy	9 – 33	Rhein Fire	Schauinsland-Reisen-Arena	12,665	ProSieben Maxx	2.8% (P7 Maxx)	
Sun, 4. June	Eastern	Leipzig Kings	18 – 15	Prague Lions	Stadion FK Viktoria Žižkov	1,347	O2		
Sun, 4. June	Central	Raiders Tirol	59 – 38	Munich Ravens	Alpenbauer Sportpark	6,283	ProSieben Maxx	2% (P7 Maxx)	
Bye		Milano Seamen, Stuttgart Surge, Vienna Vikings							

==== Week 2 ====
Date/Time (CEST)	Conf.	Away team	Result	Home team	Venue	Attendance	Free TV	Viewers	Ref
Sat, 10. June; 17:00/18:00	Central	Barcelona Dragons	41 – 33	Milano Seamen	Velodromo Maspes-Vigorelli	1,700	More Than Sports TV		
Sat, 10. June; 17:00/18:00	IC	Stuttgart Surge	29 – 20	Paris Musketeers	Stade Jean-Bouin	4,200	ran.de		
Sat, 10. June; 17:00/18:00	IC	Frankfurt Galaxy	48 – 13	Féhervár Enthroners	First Field	1,400	Network4		
Sat, 10. June; 17:00/18:00	IC	Cologne Centurions	23 – 14	Prague Lions	Stadion FK Viktoria Žižkov	1,047	O2		
Sun, 11. June; 13:00/16:25	Eastern	Vienna Vikings	27 – 24	Berlin Thunder	Friedrich-Ludwig-Jahn-Sportpark	4,814	ProSieben Maxx		
Sun, 11. June; 13:00/16:25	Eastern	Panthers Wrocław	31 – 6	Leipzig Kings	Bruno-Plache-Stadion	2,148	Polsat		
Sun, 11. June; 13:00/16:25	Central	Raiders Tirol	22 – 7	Helvetic Guards	Lidl Arena Wil	2,300			
Sun, 11. June; 13:00/16:25	Western	Rhein Fire	27 – 22	Hamburg Sea Devils	Volksparkstadion	32,500	ProSieben Maxx		
Bye		Munich Ravens							

==== Week 3 ====
Date/Time (CEST)	Conf.	Away team	Result	Home team	Venue	Attendance	Free TV	Viewers	Ref
Sat, 17. June/ 17:00, 18:00	Western	Hamburg Sea Devils	34 – 17	Cologne Centurions	Sportpark Höhenberg	2,246	More Than Sports TV		
Sat, 17. June/ 17:00, 18:00	Central	Barcelona Dragons	13 – 29	Raiders Tirol	Tivoli Stadion Tirol	4,285			
Sat, 17. June/ 17:00, 18:00	Eastern	Fehérvár Enthroners	24 – 47	Leipzig Kings	Bruno-Plache-Stadion	1,423	Network4, ran.de		
Sat, 17. June/ 17:00, 18:00	Eastern	Prague Lions	21 – 69	Vienna Vikings	Generali Arena	6,854	O2		
Sun, 18. June/ 13:00, 16:25	Western	Paris Musketeers	28 – 58	Rhein Fire	Schauinsland-Reisen-Arena	7,271	ProSieben Maxx		
Sun, 18. June/ 13:00, 16:25	Central	Milano Seamen	26 – 40	Stuttgart Surge	Gazi-Stadion auf der Waldau	3,112	ProSieben Maxx		
Sun, 18. June/ 13:00, 16:25	Central	Munich Ravens	39 – 10	Helvetic Guards	Lidl Arena Wil	2,050			
Sun, 18. June/ 13:00, 16:25	Eastern	Panthers Wrocław	27 – 36	Berlin Thunder	Friedrich-Ludwig-Jahn-Sportpark	4,049	Polsat		
Bye		Frankfurt Galaxy							

==== Week 4 ====
Date/Time (CEST)	Conf.	Away team	Result	Home team	Venue	Attendance	Free TV	Viewers	Ref
Sat, 24. June/ 17:00, 18:00, 19:00	Western	Paris Musketeers	13 – 30	Frankfurt Galaxy	PSD Bank Arena	7,207			
Sat, 24. June/ 17:00, 18:00, 19:00	Central	Munich Ravens	39 – 15	Barcelona Dragons	Estadi Olímpic de Terrassa	1,128	ran.de		
Sat, 24. June/ 17:00, 18:00, 19:00	Eastern	Fehérvár Enthroners	33 – 63	Panthers Wrocław	Stadion Olimpijski	2,350	Polsat, Network4, More Than Sports TV		
Sat, 24. June/ 17:00, 18:00, 19:00	Eastern	Leipzig Kings	14 – 47	Vienna Vikings	Hohe Warte Stadium	3,493			
Sun, 25. June/ 13:00, 16:25	Western	Rhein Fire	42 – 0	Cologne Centurions	Sportpark Höhenberg	4,460			
Sun, 25. June/ 13:00, 16:25	Central	Raiders Tirol	3 – 6	Stuttgart Surge	Gazi-Stadion auf der Waldau	3,447	ProSieben Maxx		
Sun, 25. June/ 13:00, 16:25	Central	Helvetic Guards	0 – 32	Milano Seamen	Velodromo Maspes-Vigorelli	1,000			
Sun, 25. June/ 13:00, 16:25	IC	Berlin Thunder	17 – 37	Hamburg Sea Devils	Stadion Hoheluft	3,872	ProSieben Maxx		
Bye		Prague Lions							

==== Week 5 ====
Date/Time (CEST)	Conf.	Away team	Result	Home team	Venue	Attendance	Free TV	Viewers	Ref
Sat, 1. July/ 14:30, 16:00	Western	Hamburg Sea Devils	23 – 27	Paris Musketeers	Stade Jean-Bouin	3,256	ran.de		
Sat, 1. July/ 14:30, 16:00	Western	Cologne Centurions	22 – 33	Frankfurt Galaxy	PSD Bank Arena	5,833			
Sat, 1. July/ 14:30, 16:00	IC	Helvetic Guards	0 – 51	Rhein Fire	Schauinsland-Reisen-Arena	8,113			
Sun, 2. July/ 14:30, 16:25	Central	Stuttgart Surge	28 – 9	Munich Ravens	Alpenbauer Sportpark	5,184	ProSieben MAXX		
Sun, 2. July/ 14:30, 16:25	Central	Milano Seamen	13 – 38	Raiders Tirol	Tivoli Stadion Tirol	4,180			
Sun, 2. July/ 14:30, 16:25	Eastern	Vienna Vikings	41 – 12	Fehérvár Enthroners	First Field	1,800	Network4+		
Sun, 2. July/ 14:30, 16:25	Eastern	Berlin Thunder	39 – 14	Leipzig Kings	Bruno-Plache-Stadion	2,598			
Sun, 2. July/ 14:30, 16:25	Eastern	Prague Lions	23 – 29	Panthers Wrocław	Stadion Olimpijski	2,400	PolSat Sport		
Bye		Barcelona Dragons							

==== Week 6 ====
Date/Time (CEST)	Conf.	Away team	Result	Home team	Venue	Attendance	Free TV	Viewers	Ref
Sat, 8. July/ 19:00	Eastern	Prague Lions	35 – 0	Leipzig Kings	canceled				
Sat, 8. July/ 19:00	IC	Frankfurt Galaxy	40 – 33	Milano Seamen	Velodromo Maspes-Vigorelli	1,500	ran.de		
Sun, 9. July/ 13:00, 16:25	Central	Barcelona Dragons	19 – 22 (2OT)	Helvetic Guards	Lidl Arena	1,750			
Sun, 9. July/ 13:00, 16:25	Eastern	Fehérvár Enthroners	6 – 60	Berlin Thunder	Friedrich-Ludwig-Jahn-Sportpark	3,978	Network4		
Sun, 9. July/ 13:00, 16:25	IC	Panthers Wrocław	10 – 17	Hamburg Sea Devils	Stadion Hoheluft	3,140	ProSieben Maxx, Polsat Sport	4.1% (P7 Maxx)	
Sun, 9. July/ 13:00, 16:25	IC	Vienna Vikings	34 – 13	Raiders Tirol	Tivoli Stadion Tirol	4,375			
Sun, 9. July/ 13:00, 16:25	IC	Paris Musketeers	6 – 14	Stuttgart Surge	Gazi-Stadion auf der Waldau	4,001			
Sun, 9. July/ 13:00, 16:25	IC	Munich Ravens	25 – 39	Rhein Fire	Schauinsland-Reisen-Arena	7,562	ProSieben Maxx		
Bye		Cologne Centurions							

==== Week 7 ====
Date/Time (CEST)	Conf.	Away team	Result	Home team	Venue	Attendance	Free TV	Viewers	Ref
Sat, 15. July/ 18:00, 19:00	Central	Raiders Tirol	17 – 3	Barcelona Dragons	Estadi Olímpic de Terrassa	1,158			
Sat, 15. July/ 18:00, 19:00	Eastern	Panthers Wrocław	21 – 24	Vienna Vikings	Hohe Warte Stadium	3,937	Polsat Sport		
Sat, 15. July/ 18:00, 19:00	IC	Leipzig Kings	16 – 16	Cologne Centurions	canceled				
Sun, 16. July	Western	Hamburg Sea Devils	14 – 17	Frankfurt Galaxy	PSD Bank Arena	6,500	P7 Maxx		
Sun, 16. July	Western	Rhein Fire	37 – 25	Paris Musketeers	Stade Jean-Bouin	4,500			
Sun, 16. July	Central	Stuttgart Surge	13 – 31	Helvetic Guards	Lidl Arena	2,000	TV24		
Sun, 16. July	Central	Milano Seamen	37 – 56	Munich Ravens	Alpenbauer Sportpark	4,028	P7 Maxx		
Sun, 16. July	Eastern	Berlin Thunder	43 – 6	Prague Lions	Stadion FK Viktoria Žižkov	970	O2 TV		
Bye		Fehérvár Enthroners							

==== Week 8 ====
Date/Time (CEST)	Conf.	Away team	Result	Home team	Venue	Attendance	Free TV	Viewers	Ref
Sat, 22. July/ 18:00	Central	Munich Ravens	24 – 25	Raiders Tirol	Alpenbauer Sportpark	3,447	ran.de		
Sat, 22. July/ 18:00	Eastern	Berlin Thunder	9 – 16	Vienna Vikings	Hohe Warte Stadium	4,325			
Sun, 23. July/ 13:00, 16:25	Western	Frankfurt Galaxy	23 – 21	Paris Musketeers	Stade Jean-Bouin	4,000			
Sun, 23. July/ 13:00, 16:25	Western	Cologne Centurions	3 – 62	Rhein Fire	Schauinsland-Reisen-Arena	10,056	ProSieben Maxx		
Sun, 23. July/ 13:00, 16:25	Central	Barcelona Dragons	14 – 33	Stuttgart Surge	Gazi-Stadion auf der Waldau	4,174	ProSieben Maxx		
Sun, 23. July/ 13:00, 16:25	Central	Milano Seamen	24 – 31	Helvetic Guards	Lidl Arena	2,400			
Sun, 23. July/ 13:00, 16:25	Eastern	Leipzig Kings	6 – 31	Panthers Wrocław	canceled				
Sun, 23. July/ 13:00, 16:25	Eastern	Prague Lions	0 – 35	Fehérvár Enthroners	canceled				
Bye		Hamburg Sea Devils							

==== Week 9 ====
Date/Time (CEST)	Conf.	Away team	Result	Home team	Venue	Attendance	Free TV	Viewers	Ref
Sat, 29. July	Central	Stuttgart Surge	78 – 27	Milano Seamen	Velodromo Maspes-Vigorelli	1,200	ran.de		
Sat, 29. July	Eastern	Panthers Wrocław	73 – 13	Prague Lions	Sportovní centrum Hostivař	370	O2, Polsat Sport		
Sat, 29. July	IC	Paris Musketeers	37 – 6	Barcelona Dragons	Estadi Olímpic de Terrassa	1,543			
Sun, 30. July	Western	Cologne Centurions	14 – 18	Hamburg Sea Devils	Stadion Hoheluft	3,200	ProSieben MAXX		
Sun, 30. July	Central	Helvetic Guards	6 – 35	Munich Ravens	Alpenbauer Sportparkerhaching	4,345	TV24		
Sun, 30. July	Eastern	Vienna Vikings	47 – 14	Leipzig Kings	canceled				
Sun, 30. July	IC	Fehérvár Enthroners	0 – 46	Frankfurt Galaxy	PSD Bank Arena	5,113	ProSieben MAXX, Network4		
Bye		Rhein Fire, Raiders Tirol, Berlin Thunder							

==== Week 10 ====
Date/Time (CEST)	Conf.	Away team	Result	Home team	Venue	Attendance	Free TV	Viewers	Ref
5./6. August	All teams on bye								

==== Week 11 ====
Date/Time (CEST)	Conf.	Away team	Result	Home team	Venue	Attendance	Free TV	Viewers	Ref
Sat, 12. August	Western	Frankfurt Galaxy	22 – 9	Cologne Centurions	Südstadion	2,450	ran.de		
Sat, 12. August	Central	Helvetic Guards	14 – 24	Raiders Tirol	Tivoli Stadion Tirol	3,062			
Sat, 12. August	Central	Milano Seamen	33 – 28	Barcelona Dragons	Estadi Olímpic de Terrassa	711	More Than Sports TV		
Sat, 12. August	Eastern	Leipzig Kings	24 – 47	Fehérvár Enthroners	canceled				
Sun, 13. August	Western	Hamburg Sea Devils	9 – 40	Rhein Fire	Schauinsland-Reisen-Arena	13,171	ProSiebenMaxx		
Sun, 13. August	Central	Munich Ravens	32 – 30	Stuttgart Surge	Gazi-Stadion auf der Waldau	4,772	ProSiebenMaxx		
Sun, 13. August	Eastern	Prague Lions	7 – 40	Berlin Thunder	Friedrich-Ludwig-Jahn-Sportpark	3,906	O2TVSport		
Sun, 13. August	Eastern	Vienna Vikings	20 – 16	Panthers Wrocław	Stadion Olimpijski	2,850	Polsat		
Bye		Paris Musketeers							

==== Week 12 ====
Date/Time (CEST)	Conf.	Away team	Result	Home team	Venue	Attendance	Free TV	Viewers	Ref
Sat, 19. August	Central	Stuttgart Surge	31 – 22	Barcelona Dragons	Estadi Olímpic de Terrassa	516			
Sat, 19. August	Eastern	Prague Lions	3 – 19	Fehérvár Enthroners	First Field	2,000	O2TV, Network4		
Sat, 19. August	IC	Cologne Centurions	16 – 16	Leipzig Kings	canceled				
Sat, 19. August	IC	Raiders Tirol	7 – 13	Vienna Vikings	Hohe Warte Stadium	4,452			
Sun, 20. August	Western	Paris Musketeers	29 – 19	Hamburg Sea Devils	Stadion Hoheluft	2,783	ProSiebenMaxx		
Sun, 20. August	Eastern	Berlin Thunder	12 – 15	Panthers Wrocław	Stadion Olimpijski	2,300	Polsat, ran.de		
Sun, 20. August	IC	Rhein Fire	60 – 23	Munich Ravens	Alpenbauer Sportpark	5,011	ProSiebenMaxx		
Sun, 20. August	IC	Milano Seamen	14 – 53	Frankfurt Galaxy	PSD Bank Arena	5,269			
Bye		Helvetic Guards							

==== Week 13 ====
Date/Time (CEST)	Conf.	Away team	Result	Home team	Venue	Attendance	Free TV	Viewers	Ref
Sat, 26. August	Central	Stuttgart Surge	38 – 28	Raiders Tirol	Alpenbauer Sportpark	4,073	TV24, ran.de		
Sat, 26. August	Central	Munich Ravens	50 – 29	Milano Seamen	Velodromo Maspes-Vigorelli	700			
Sat, 26. August	Eastern	Fehérvár Enthroners	20 – 21	Vienna Vikings	Football-Zentrum Ravelin	1,200	Network4, More Than Sports TV		
Sat, 26. August	IC	Barcelona Dragons	9 – 50	Paris Musketeers	Stade Jean-Bouin	3,800			
Sun, 27. August	Western	Frankfurt Galaxy	23 – 13	Hamburg Sea Devils	Stadion Hoheluft	3,486	ProSiebenMaxx		
Sun, 27. August	Eastern	Leipzig Kings	14 – 39	Berlin Thunder	canceled				
Sun, 27. August	IC	Prague Lions	9 – 37	Cologne Centurions	Südstadion	2,150	O2TVSport		
Sun, 27. August	IC	Rhein Fire	43 – 17	Helvetic Guards	Lidl Arena	3,060	ProSiebenMaxx		
Bye		Panthers Wrocław							

==== Week 14 ====
Date/Time (CEST)	Conf.	Away team	Result	Home team	Venue	Attendance	Free TV	Viewers	Ref
Sat, 2. September	Western	Cologne Centurions	12 – 40	Paris Musketeers	Stade Jean-Bouin	4,500			
Sat, 2. September	Central	Raiders Tirol	42 – 27	Milano Seamen	Velodromo Maspes-Vigorelli	500	ran.de		
Sun, 3. September	Western	Rhein Fire	48 – 38	Frankfurt Galaxy	PSD Bank Arena	10,027	ProSiebenMaxx		
Sun, 3. September	Central	Helvetic Guards	19 – 47	Stuttgart Surge	Gazi-Stadion auf der Waldau	3,900	TV24		
Sun, 3. September	Central	Barcelona Dragons	0 – 55	Munich Ravens	Alpenbauer Sportpark	5,204			
Sun, 3. September	Eastern	Vienna Vikings	55 – 9	Prague Lions	Athletic Stadium Slavia Praha	250	O2TVSport		
Sun, 3. September	Eastern	Panthers Wrocław	35 – 6	Fehérvár Enthroners	First Field	1,800	Network4, Polsat		
Sun, 3. September	IC	Hamburg Sea Devils	16 – 23	Berlin Thunder	Friedrich-Ludwig-Jahn-Sportpark	6,084	ProSiebenMaxx		
Bye		Leipzig Kings							

=== Results ===
Home \ Away	COL	FRA	HAM	PAR	RHE	BAR	HEL	MIL	MUN	STU	TIR	BER	FEH	LEI	PRA	VIE	WRO
Cologne Centurions		9–22	17–34	17–24	0–42									16–16	37–9		
Frankfurt Galaxy	33–22		17–14	30–13	38–48			53–14					46–0				
Hamburg Sea Devils	18–14	13–23		19–29	22–27							37–17					17–10
Paris Musketeers	40–12	21–23	27–23		25–37	50–9				20–29							
Rhein Fire	62–3	33–9	40–9	58–28			51–0		39–25								
Barcelona Dragons				6–37			29–17	28–33	15–39	22–31	3–17						
Helvetic Guards					17–43	22–19		31–24	10–39	31–13	7–22						
Milano Seamen		33–40				33–41	32–0		29–50	27–78	27–42						
Munich Ravens					23–60	55–0	35–6	56–37		9–28	38–59						
Stuttgart Surge				14–6		33–14	47–19	40–26	30–32		6–3						
Raiders Tirol						29–13	24–14	38–13	25–24	28–38						13–34	
Berlin Thunder			23–16										60–6	39–14	40–7	24–27	36–27
Fehérvár Enthroners		13–48										3–36		47–24	35–0	12–41	6–35
Leipzig Kings	16–16											14–39	47–24		0–35	14–47	6–31
Prague Lions	14–23											6–43	3–19	15–18		9–55	13–73
Vienna Vikings											13–7	16–9	21–20	47–14	69–21		24–21
Wrocław Panthers			34–25									15–12	63–33	31–6	29–23	16–20	

Updated to match(es) played on unknown. Source: europeanleague.football

=== Standings ===
Western Conference
Pos	Team	GP	W	L	CONF	PF	PA	DIFF	STK	Qualification
1	(Germany) Rhein Fire	12	12	0	8–0	540	199	+341	W12	Automatic playoffs (#1)
2	(Germany) Frankfurt Galaxy	12	10	2	6–2	382	233	+149	L1	Advance to playoffs (#4)
3	(France) Paris Musketeers	12	6	6	4–4	320	277	+43	W4	
4	(Germany) Hamburg Sea Devils	12	4	8	2–6	247	278	–31	L4	
5	(Germany) Cologne Centurions	12	4	8	0–8	186	330	–144	L1	

Source: europeanleague.football

Central Conference
Pos	Team	GP	W	L	CONF	PF	PA	DIFF	STK	Qualification
1	(Germany) Stuttgart Surge	12	10	2	8–2	387	237	+150	W3	Automatic playoffs (#3)
2	(Austria) Raiders Tirol	12	8	4	8–2	307	230	+77	W1	
3	(Germany) Munich Ravens	12	7	5	7–3	425	338	+87	W2	
4	(Switzerland) Helvetic Guards	12	3	9	3–7	174	378	–204	L4	
5	(Italy) Milano Seamen	12	2	10	2–8	328	497	–169	L3	
6	(Spain) Barcelona Dragons	12	2	10	2–8	199	396	–197	L10	

Source: europeanleague.football

Eastern Conference
Pos	Team	GP	W	L	CONF	PF	PA	DIFF	STK	Qualification
1	(Austria) Vienna Vikings	12	12	0	10–0	414	180	+234	W12	Automatic playoffs (#2)
2	(Germany) Berlin Thunder	12	8	4	7–3	378	188	+190	W2	Advance to playoffs (#5)
3	(Poland) Panthers Wrocław	12	8	4	7–3	385	221	+164	W2	Advance to playoffs (#6)
4	(Hungary) Fehérvár Enthroners	12	3	9	3–7	218	424	–206	L2	
5	(Germany) Leipzig Kings	12	2	10	2–8	189	387	–198	L9	
6	(Czech Republic) Prague Lions	12	1	11	1–9	155	441	–286	L7	

Source: europeanleague.football

Overall standings
#	Team	Division	W	L	PCT	CONF	PD	STK
Conference leaders
1	(Germany) Rhein Fire	West	12	0	1.000	8–0	+341	W12
2	(Austria) Vienna Vikings	East	12	0	1.000	10–0	+234	W12
3	(Germany) Stuttgart Surge	Central	10	2	.833	8–2	+150	W3
Wild cards
4	(Germany) Frankfurt Galaxy	West	10	2	.833	6–2	+149	L1
5	(Germany) Berlin Thunder	East	8	4	.667	7–3	+190	W2
6	(Poland) Panthers Wrocław	East	8	4	.667	7–3	+164	W2
Eliminated
7	(Austria) Raiders Tirol	Central	8	4	.667	8–2	+77	W1
8	(Germany) Munich Ravens	Central	7	5	.583	7–3	+87	W2
9	(France) Paris Musketeers	West	6	6	.500	4–4	+43	W4
10	(Germany) Hamburg Sea Devils	West	4	8	.333	2–6	–31	L4
11	(Germany) Cologne Centurions	West	4	8	.333	0–8	–144	L1
12	(Switzerland) Helvetic Guards	Central	3	9	.250	3–7	–204	L4
13	(Hungary) Fehérvár Enthroners	East	3	9	.250	3–7	–206	L2
14	(Italy) Milano Seamen	Central	2	10	.167	2–8	–169	L3
15	(Spain) Barcelona Dragons	Central	2	10	.167	2–8	–197	L10
16	(Germany) ~~Leipzig Kings~~	East	2	10	.167	2–8	–198	L9
17	(Czech Republic) Prague Lions	East	1	11	.083	1–9	–286	L7

C - Clinched conference title
Q - Clinched playoffs

In case ties inside and between the conferences have to be broken, the rules are:

1. Number of wins
2. Head-to-head matchup (Note: Only applicable if matchups have taken place and with additional rules)
3. Points difference in head-to-head matchups
4. Points scored at away games of head-to-head matchups
5. Total points difference
6. Total points scored
7. Point scored at away games
8. Coin toss performed by the Commissioner or a person (e.g., a prominent sportsmen) determined by the Commissioner

== Play-offs ==
The wildcard games were played on September 09 and 10, the semifinals on September 16 and 17, and the final was held on September 24, 2023 in Duisburg, Germany.

Wildcard
4	(Germany) Frankfurt Galaxy	20
5	(Germany) Berlin Thunder	3
3	(Germany) Stuttgart Surge	37
6	(Poland) Wrocław Panthers	14

Semifinals
1	(Germany) Rhein Fire	42
4	(Germany) Frankfurt Galaxy	23
2	(Austria) Vienna Vikings	33
3	(Germany) Stuttgart Surge	40

Championship Game
1	(Germany) Rhein Fire	53
3	(Germany) Stuttgart Surge	34

=== Wildcard ===
==== Berlin Thunder 03, Frankfurt Galaxy 20 ====
Berlin Thunder vs. Frankfurt Galaxy

Quarter	1	2	3	4	Total
Thunder	3	0	0	0	3
Galaxy	0	13	7	0	20

at PSD Bank Arena, Frankfurt, Germany

- Date: 09 September 2023
- Game time: 15:15 CEST
- Game attendance: 5,113
- Referee: T. Thordarson
- Game Book

==== Panthers Wrocław 14, Stuttgart Surge 37 ====
Panthers Wrocław vs. Stuttgart Surge

Quarter	1	2	3	4	Total
Panthers	0	7	7	0	14
Surge	7	20	3	7	37

at Gazi-Stadion auf der Waldau, Stuttgart, Germany

- Date: 10 September 2023
- Game time: 14:15 CEST
- Game attendance: 4,210
- Referee: M. Scholz
- Game Book

=== Semi Finals ===
==== Rhein Fire 42, Frankfurt Galaxy 23 ====
Frankfurt Galaxy vs. Rhein Fire

Quarter	1	2	3	4	Total
Galaxy	3	13	7	0	23
Fire	0	14	14	14	42

at Schauinsland-Reisen-Arena, Duisburg, Germany

- Date: 17 September 2023
- Game time: 14:15 CEST
- Game attendance: 9,858
- Referee: F. Kristensen
- Game Book

==== Stuttgart Surge 40, Vienna Vikings 33 ====
Stuttgart Surge vs. Vienna Vikings

Quarter	1	2	3	4	Total
Surge	7	7	18	8	40
Vikings	0	10	14	9	33

at Generali Arena Vienna, Vienna, Austria

- Date: 16 September 2023
- Game time: 14:15 CEST
- Game attendance: 10,108
- Referee: K.Walentynowicz
- Game Book

=== Championship Game ===
==== Stuttgart Surge 34, Rhein Fire 53 ====
Stuttgart Surge vs. Rhein Fire

Quarter	1	2	3	4	Total
Surge	6	14	8	6	34
Fire	7	17	9	20	53

at Schauinsland-Reisen-Arena, Duisburg, Germany

- Date: 24 September 2023
- Game time: 15:30 CEST
- Game attendance: 31,500
- Referee: W. Ratajczak
- Game Book

== Attendance ==
As of September 03, 2023

Pos	Team	Total	High	Low	Average	Change
1	Rhein Fire	58,838	13,171	7,271	9,806	+12.0%
2	Hamburg Sea Devils	48,981	32,500	2,783	8,164	+128.0%
3	Frankfurt Galaxy	39,949	10,027	5,113	6,658	+32.9%
4	Munich Ravens	30,055	6,283	4,028	5,009	n/a
5	Vienna Vikings	24,261	6,854	1,200	4,044	+17.3%
6	Paris Musketeers	24,256	4,500	3,256	4,043	n/a
7	Raiders Tirol	23,422	4,375	3,062	3,904	+5.7%
8	Stuttgart Surge	23,406	4,772	3,112	3,901	+87.2%
9	Berlin Thunder	22,831	6,084	3,906	4,566	+27.4%
10	Cologne Centurions	13,876	4,460	2,150	2,775	+18.4%
11	Helvetic Guards	13,560	3,060	1,750	2,260	n/a
12	Panthers Wrocław	12,750	2,850	2,300	2,550	+8.8%
13	Fehérvár Enthroners	8,800	2,000	1,400	1,760	n/a
14	Milano Seamen	6,600	1,700	500	1,100	n/a
15	Barcelona Dragons	6,484	1,543	516	1,081	+5.5%
16	Leipzig Kings	6,169	2,598	1,423	2,056	−20.9%
17	Prague Lions	3,984	1,347	250	797	n/a
	League total	367,912	32,500	250	3,914	+22.3%

== Statistical leaders ==
As of August 27, 2023

Category	Player	Position	Team	GP	Stat
Passing
Yards	Jadrian Clark (United States)	QB	Rhein Fire	11	3387
Touchdowns	Jadrian Clark (United States)	QB	Rhein Fire	11	50
Completions	Luke Zahradka (United States)	QB	Milano Seamen	11	278
Completion percentage	Chad Jeffries (United States)	QB	Munich Ravens	11	69.0%
Rushing
Yards	Dawid Brzozowski (Poland)	RB	Panthers Wrocław	10	961
Touchdowns	Tomiwa Oyewo (Republic of Ireland)	RB	Munich Ravens	11	12
Yards per attempt	Glen Toonga (United Kingdom)	RB	Rhein Fire	7	7.3
Receiving
Yards	Markell Castle (United States)	WR	Munich Ravens	11	1451
Touchdowns	Tony Tate (United States)	WR	Panthers Wrocław	10	16
Receptions	Markell Castle (United States)	WR	Munich Ravens	11	83
Yards per reception	Tony Tate (United States)	WR	Panthers Wrocław	10	22.9
Defensive
Sacks	Kyle Kitchens (United States)	DE	Berlin Thunder	10	13
Tackles	Luke Glenna (United States)	S	Barcelona Dragons	11	125
Interceptions	Macéo Beard (France)	LB	Helvetic Guards	11	8
Kicking
FG Pct	Nils Jonkmans (Switzerland)	K	Helvetic Guards	11	85.7
PAT Pct	Jakub Ałdaś (Poland)	K	Panthers Wrocław	10	89.7

== Awards ==
=== MVP of the Week ===
Week	Player	Position	Team	Stat	Source
1	Jarvis McClam (United States)	WR	Raiders Tirol	435 all-purpose yards, 3 TD	1
2	Conor Miller (United States)	QB	Barcelona Dragons	394 passing yards, 4 TD, 0 INT	2
3	Jadrian Clark (United States)	QB	Rhein Fire	513 passing yards, 8 TD, 0 INT	3
4	Malik Stanley (United States)	WR	Hamburg Sea Devils	116 receiving yards, 4 TD	4
5	Slade Jarman (United States)	QB	Berlin Thunder	382 passing yards, 5 TD	
6	Nico Strahmann (Germany)	WR	Frankfurt Galaxy	175 receiving yards, 4 TD	6
7	Aaron Jackson (United States)	WR	Berlin Thunder	392 all-purpose yards, 4 total TD	7
8	Ken Hike Jr. (United States)	CB	Helvetic Guards	194 all-purpose yards, 1 KR TD, 1 FR TD, 7 tackles	8
9	Kenyatte Allen (United States)	QB	Stuttgart Surge	551 total yards, 4 rush TD, 4 pass TD, 0 INT	9
11	Macéo Beard (France)	DB	Helvetic Guards	2 INT, 1 TD, 3 tackles	11
12	Jadrian Clark (United States)	QB	Rhein Fire	285 passing yards, 7 TD, 1 INT	12
13	Zach Edwards (United States)	QB	Paris Musketeers	404 total yards, 5 pass TD, 0 INT	13

== Signees to other professional leagues ==
The following players invited to the NFL’s International Combine, assigned to NFL's International Player Pathway Program (IPPP), signed or drafted by CFL team or signed with the UFL team following their involvement with the ELF in 2023:

=== NFL ===
The following players were invited to the NFL’s International Combine:

Player	Position	ELF team	NFL team
Florian Bierbaumer	TE	Vienna Vikings	International Combine

=== CFL ===
The following players signed with a CFL team:

Player	Position	ELF team	CFL team
Tony Tate	WR	Wroclaw Panthers	Edmonton Elks

The following players were drafted by a CFL team:

Player	Position	ELF team	CFL team
Fabian Weitz	LB	Cologne Centurions	Winnipeg Blue Bombers
Lucky Ogbevoen	DB	Raiders Tirol	Winnipeg Blue Bombers

== Broadcasting ==
Selected games are available on free TV in most of the participating countries. For the Austrian and German market, the league's main broadcasting partner is ProSiebenSat.1 Media. In Germany ProSieben MAXX and their online-streaming service ran.de airs games on Saturday and Sunday. All games are also available worldwide on ELF Gamepass.

Region(s)	Broadcaster(s)
International	ELF Gamepass
Germany; Austria; Switzerland	ProSieben Maxx ranSport; More Than Sports TV
Hungary	Arena4
Poland	Polsat Sport
Czech Republic; Slovakia	O2 TV Sport
Switzerland	TV24
China	iQIYI
