= 2023 Berlin Thunder season =

2023 Berlin Thunder (ELF) season
- General manager: Diana Hoge
- Head coach: (Germany) Johnny Schmuck
- Home stadium: Friedrich-Ludwig-Jahn-Sportpark

Results
- Record: 8–4
- Conference place: 2nd
- Playoffs: Lost in wild-card to Frankfurt Galaxy 3–20

Uniform

The 2023 Berlin Thunder season is the third season of the Berlin Thunder team in the European League of Football.

== Preseason ==
After missing the play-offs in the last game of 2022, the franchise extended the contracts of head coach Johnny Schmuck and defensive coordinator Christopher Kuhfeldt. The first roster move of the season was resigning team and league defensive player of the 2022 season Kyle Kitchens. Homegrown talent Max Zimmermann (Canadian football) was the first new signing for the Berlin Thunder.

== Regular season ==
=== Standings ===
Eastern Conference
Pos	Team	GP	W	L	CONF	PF	PA	DIFF	STK	Qualification
1	(Austria) Vienna Vikings	12	12	0	10–0	414	180	+234	W12	Automatic playoffs (#2)
2	(Germany) Berlin Thunder	12	8	4	7–3	378	188	+190	W2	Advance to playoffs (#5)
3	(Poland) Panthers Wrocław	12	8	4	7–3	385	221	+164	W2	Advance to playoffs (#6)
4	(Hungary) Fehérvár Enthroners	12	3	9	3–7	218	424	–206	L2	
5	(Germany) Leipzig Kings	12	2	10	2–8	189	387	–198	L9	
6	(Czech Republic) Prague Lions	12	1	11	1–9	155	441	–286	L7	

Source: europeanleague.football

=== Schedule ===
Week	Date	Time (CET)	Opponent (Note: Intra-Conference games are in bold text)	Result	Record	Venue	TV (Note: All games can also be watched live on ELF Gamepass) (Note: Viewers in brackets if available)	Recap
1	Sat, June 3	17:00	@ Fehérvár Enthroners	W 36–3	1–0	First Field		1
2	Sun, June 11	13:00	Vienna Vikings	L 24–27	1–1	Friedrich-Ludwig-Jahn-Sportpark		2
3	Sun, June 18	16:25	Panthers Wrocław	W 36–27	2–1	Friedrich-Ludwig-Jahn-Sportpark		3
4	Sun, June 25	16:25	@ Hamburg Sea Devils	L 17–37	2–2	Stadion Hoheluft		
5	Sun, July 2	14:30	@ Leipzig Kings	W 39–14	3–2	Bruno-Plache-Stadion		
6	Sun, July 9	13:00	Fehérvár Enthroners	W 60–6	4–2	Friedrich-Ludwig-Jahn-Sportpark		
7	Sun, July 16	13:00	@ Prague Lions	W 43–6	5–2	eFotbal Arena		
8	Sat, July 22	18:00	@ Vienna Vikings	L 9–16	5–3	Hohe Warte Stadium		
9	July 29/30	bye						
10	August 5/6	bye						
11	Sun, August 13	16:25	Prag Lions	W 40–7	6–3	Friedrich-Ludwig-Jahn-Sportpark		
12	Sat, August 19	17:00	@ Panthers Wrocław	L 12–15	6–4	Olympic Stadium Wrocław		
13	Sun, August 27	Cancelled	Leipzig Kings	W 39–14	7–4	Friedrich-Ludwig-Jahn-Sportpark		
14	Sun, September 3	13:00	Hamburg Sea Devils	W 23–16	8–4	Friedrich-Ludwig-Jahn-Sportpark		

Source: europeanleague.football

== Roster ==
Berlin Thunder (ELF) roster
Quarterbacks: 13 Donovan Isom (United States); Paul Stubbe (Germany); Running backs: 20 Albert Ahmad Khalife (Germany); 48 Bola Moussa FB (Germany); 24 Tim Schulz (Germany); Jeremy Sommerwerk (Germany); 22 Albert Wiesigstrauch (Germany); Wide receivers: 17 Emil Drossard (Germany); 4 Aaron Jackson (United States); 12 Bais Kouanda (Germany); 84 Maurice Rothenburg (Germany); 82 Oliver Schmidt (Germany); 7 Robin Wilzeck (Germany); 5 Max Zimmermann (Germany); Tight ends: Yannis Binner (Germany); 85 Nicolai Schumann (Germany)	Offensive linemen: Malik Ahmad (Germany); 74 Daniel Binternagel (Germany); 76 Marcel Camenz (Germany); 66 Lawrence Cornwall-Baptiste (United Kingdom); 71 Gideon Grabert (Germany); 75 Felix Lepper (Germany); 72 Max Locke (Germany); 79 Cedric Ouattara (Germany); 70 Tobias Rodlauer (Austria); 78 Philipp Weltzien (Germany); 69 Jannik Werblow (Germany); Defensive linemen: 90 Ben Baierl DT (Germany); 93 Christer Berg DT (Finland); 44 Rick Baunacke DT (Germany); 50 Hamsa El-Zein (Germany); 1 Emil Hovde (Sweden); 99 Aaron Große Kleimann (Germany); 45 Kyle Kitchens DE (United States); 98 Fabian Tchuda (Germany)	Linebackers: 18 Fery Bogard (Germany); 41 Giancarlo Boone (Germany); 53 Niclas Klopsch (Germany); 55 Marius Markert ILB (Germany); 11 Ludvig Myrén OLB (Sweden); 6 Simon Sperner (Germany); 8 Paul Seifert OLB (Germany); 25 Moritz Teuchert (Germany); Defensive backs: 31 Will Dill (Germany); 2 Rico Geyer (Germany); 3 Arne Gehrt S (Germany); 9 Jonas Gacek (Germany); 32 Viljo Lempinen (Finland); 33 Felix Mohlberg S (Germany); 30 Alex Spillum S (United States); 15 Moritz Thiele CB (Germany); Special teams: 26 Jonas Schenderlein K/P (Germany)	Rookies in italics Roster updated 15 March 2023 52 active

== Staff ==
Berlin Thunder (ELF) staff
Front office: Owner – FBG Football Berlin GmbH; CEO – Levon Melikian; General Manager – Diana Hoge; Director of football – Björn Werner; Head of operations – Marcus Döbler; Head coach: Head coach – Johnny Schmuck; Offensive coaches: Offensive coordinator – Henry Schlegel; Quarterbacks – Darius Outlaw; Running backs – Curtis Cooper; Wide receivers/tight ends/fullbacks – Elijah Pope; Offensive line – Ron Bauerfeind	Defensive coaches: Defensive coordinator – Christopher Kuhfeldt; Assis. DC and defensive backs – José Schmitt; Defensive line – Mario Baierl; Linebackers – Simon Bohlmann; Special teams coaches: Special teams coordinator – Jörg Bauerfeind; Assistant coaches: Offensive assistant – Kyle Israel; Mental coach – Fatima Yazici; Strength and conditioning: Head athletic coach – Christopher Kuhfeldt; Staff updated 24 April 2023
