= Ja'Len Embry =

American football player (born 1994)

No. 12 – Prague Lions
- Position: Defensive back
- Roster status: Active

Personal information
- Born: March 14, 1996 (age 30); Detroit, Michigan
- Listed height: 6 ft 0 in (1.83 m)
- Listed weight: 198 lb (90 kg)

Career information
- High school: Martin Luther King (Detroit, Michigan)
- College: Iowa (2014); Iowa Central CC (2015); Northern Illinois (2016–2018)
- NFL draft: 2019: undrafted

Career history
- Houston Texans (2019)*; Aviators (2020–2021)*; New Orleans Breakers (2022)*; Frankfurt Galaxy (2022); Raiders Tirol (2023)*; Montreal Alouettes (2023); Raiders Tirol (2023); Madrid Bravos (2024); Prague Lions (2025–2026); Berlin Thunder (2026)
- * Offseason or practice squad member only

Ja'Len Embry (born March 14, 1996) is an American football defensive back for the Prague Lions of the European League of Football (ELF). He played college football at Iowa, Iowa Central CC and Northern Illinois.

== Early life ==
Embry began his football career at the age of ten with the Detroit Northwest Lions, and went on to play for the Oak Park Trojans and the Detroit Dolphins. He attended Martin Luther King Jr. Senior High School in Detroit, where he initially played baseball and track. He did not think he could compete in football at the high school level. It was not until his junior year that he joined the Crusaders football team, along with future NFL athlete Avonte Maddox, at defensive back and wide receiver. Embry was an immediate contributor on both sides of the ball for his team, which won the city championship in 2012. He was selected to the all-city team as well as the all-state second team. As a senior in 2013, he was named a first-team all-state selection as well as first-team all-metro and all-city.

== College career ==
In 2014, he committed to the University of Iowa as a three-star recruit, where he redshirted his freshman year with the Hawkeyes. In 2015, he transferred to Iowa Central Community College. For the Tritons, he recorded 49 tackles and one interception in ten games. For the 2016 season, Embry was recruited by Northern Illinois University. After sitting out his first season with the Huskies, he appeared in every game at cornerback and on special teams in 2017. In his senior year, Embry was a regular. He recorded 60 tackles and eight pass break-ups, helping his team to the conference title.

== Professional career ==
Pre-draft measurables
| Height | Weight | Arm length | Hand span | 40-yard dash | 10-yard split | 20-yard split | 20-yard shuttle | Three-cone drill | Vertical jump | Broad jump | Bench press |
|---|---|---|---|---|---|---|---|---|---|---|---|
| 5 ft 10 in (1.78 m) | 195 lb (88 kg) | 30 7/8 in (0.78 m) | 9 1/4 in (0.23 m) | 4.68 s | 1.63 s | 2.68 s | 4.35 s | 6.97 s | 33 in (0.84 m) | 9 ft 9 in (2.97 m) | 13 reps |
All values from Pro Day

Embry was not invited to the NFL Combine and instead participated in the Northern Illinois Pro Day.

=== North America ===
In the spring of 2019, Embry received an invitation to the Houston Texans' rookie mini-camp, but was subsequently not signed to a contract. In 2020, he was signed by the Aviators of The Spring League, a scouting and developmental league. He lost to the Generals in the finals with the Aviators. Embry returned to the Aviators for the 2021 season.

In the 2022 USFL draft, Embry was selected as the 28th cornerback in the eleventh round by the New Orleans Breakers. Embry struggled with injuries and was released after the first day of play on April 19.

=== Europe ===
In June 2022, Embry was signed by the Frankfurt Galaxy before the second week of play in the European League of Football (ELF). Embry was considered there as a slot corner. He played frequently as a safety with the Galaxy and led his team with a total of four interceptions. With a record of eight wins to four losses, Galaxy finished third in the Central Conference and missed the playoffs.

In December 2022, the Raiders Tirol announced the signing of Embry for the 2023 ELF season. On April 4, 2023, the Raiders released him due to an option clause and the Montreal Alouettes announcing his signing.

=== Canada ===
In early May 2023, Embry accepted an offer from the Montreal Alouettes of the Canadian Football League (CFL). On June 3, he was released as part of the final roster cuts before the start of the season.

=== Return to Europe ===
Almost three weeks after being released from the Alouettes, Embry was signed again by the Raiders Tirol, which meant that he was active from the fourth game week of the ELF season.

=== Professional statistics ===
| Year | Team | GP | GS | Tackles | | | | | | Interceptions | | | | | Miscellaneous | |
| Year | Team | GP | GS | Cmb | Solo | Ast | TFL | Yds | Sck | FF | PD | Int | Yds | TDs | Blk | Saf |
|---|---|---|---|---|---|---|---|---|---|---|---|---|---|---|---|---|
European League of Football
| 2022 | Frankfurt Galaxy | 11 | 11 | 44 | 34 | 10 | 2.5 | | 0 | 0 | 13 | 4 | 57 | 0 | 0 | 0 |
| 2023 | Raiders Tirol | 9 | 8 | 31 | 22 | 9 | 0.0 | | 0 | 0 | | 1 | 0 | 0 | 1 | 0 |
| 2024 | Madrid Bravos | 8 | 7 | 32 | 24 | 8 | 1.0 | | 0 | 0 | | 4 | 73 | 1 | 0 | 0 |
| ELF total | | 28 | 26 | 107 | 80 | 27 | 3.5 | | 0 | 0 | 13 | 9 | 130 | 1 | 1 | 0 |
Source: stats.europeanleague.football
