= 2023 Fehérvár Enthroners season =

American football team in Hungary

- General manager: Viktor Bóka
- Head coach: Jaime Hill
- Home stadium: First Field

The 2023 Fehérvár Enthroners season is the first season of the Fehérvár Enthroners in the European League of Football for the 2023 season, after participating in the second tier of the Austrian Football League. They went unbeaten winning the Hungarian league championship 2023.

== Preseason ==
The front office and the core team from last season was mainly kept together, re-signing with head coach Jaime Hill and his team. The first signing of players was Jebrai Regan, also being member of the squad in the year prior. After finding their starting quarterback in Gabriel Cunningham, coming from the Leipzig Kings, the Enthroners signed Anthony Rodriguez from the Barcelona Dragons

== Regular season ==
=== Standings ===
Eastern Conference
Pos	Team	GP	W	L	CONF	PF	PA	DIFF	STK	Qualification
1	(Austria) Vienna Vikings	12	12	0	10–0	414	180	+234	W12	Automatic playoffs (#2)
2	(Germany) Berlin Thunder	12	8	4	7–3	378	188	+190	W2	Advance to playoffs (#5)
3	(Poland) Panthers Wrocław	12	8	4	7–3	385	221	+164	W2	Advance to playoffs (#6)
4	(Hungary) Fehérvár Enthroners	12	3	9	3–7	218	424	–206	L2	
5	(Germany) Leipzig Kings	12	2	10	2–8	189	387	–198	L9	
6	(Czech Republic) Prague Lions	12	1	11	1–9	155	441	–286	L7	

Source: europeanleague.football

== Roster ==
Fehérvár Enthroners roster
Quarterbacks: 3 Jerod Evans (United States); 10 Máté Hegedűs (Hungary); Running backs: 39 Kende Ráthonyi (Hungary); 34 Levente Tóth FB (Hungary); 36 Erik Madaras (Hungary); 41 Dávid Novakov (Hungary); Wide receivers: 12 Benjamin Plu (France); 14 Márton Mészáros (Hungary); 18 László Benedek (Hungary); 82 Nándor Tóth (Hungary); 88 Jay Griffin IV (United States); Tight ends: 86 László Boros (Hungary); 87 Kristóf Horváth (Hungary)	Offensive linemen: 56 Connor Bolton T (United Kingdom); 70 Zsolt Bosznai C (Hungary); 66 László Filep T (Hungary); 67 Bence Horváth L. C (Hungary); 64 Bálint Kéri G (Hungary); 72 Máté Károly G (Hungary); 75 Márk Lekrinszki G (Hungary); 53 Alper Peközer G (Turkey); 62 Rajmund Radics G (Hungary); 79 Dániel Szabó T (Hungary); Defensive linemen: 57 Álmos Illés DE (Hungary); 99 Péter Fehér DT (Hungary); 92 Balázs Gráber DT (Hungary); 90 Florian Hirsch DE (Austria); 94 Dávid Józsa DT (Hungary); 96 Barna Kovács DT (Hungary); 54 Dániel Pantali DE (Hungary); 50 Jebrai Regan DE/OLB (United States); 98 Péter Trembulyák DE (Hungary)	Linebackers: 22 Péter Baranyai OLB (Hungary); 35 Benedek Bodnár OLB (Hungary); 42 Max Nedzelsky OLB (Hungary); 59 Vilmos Nosza MLB (Hungary); 52 Csaba Peter MLB (Hungary); 7 Antony Rodrigues OLB (France); 51 János Zilai MLB (Hungary); Defensive backs: 5 Benedek Horváth CB (Hungary); 6 Dávid Tóth S (Hungary); 8 Máté Gyarmati CB (Hungary); 21 Mateusz Dzioban SS (Poland); 23 Elijah Moody CB (United States); 24 Barnabás Gáspár SS (Hungary); 26 Márton Németh SS (Hungary); 33 Ádám Mézes CB (Hungary); 43 Botond Hansel CB (Hungary); Special teams: 9 Krisztián Somogyi K (Hungary); 16 Péter Szőke K/P (Hungary)	Rookies in italics Roster updated November 22, 2023; 3 A-import, 5 E-import, 42 homegrown 50 active

== Staff ==
Fehérvár Enthroners staff
Front office: General Manager – Viktor Bóka; Head coach: Head coach – Jaime Hill; Offensive coaches: Offensive coordinator/quarterbacks – Joe Ashfield; Running backs – n/a; Wide receivers/tight ends – James Anderson; Offensive line – Bill Meyers	Defensive coaches: Defensive coordinator – Jaime Hill; Defensive backs – Péter Szilas; Linebacker – Andre Whyte; Defensive line – Tim McGee; Special teams coaches: Special teams coordinator – Péter Hanó; Staff updated 1 April 2023
