= James Brooks (defensive end) =

American football player (born 1988)

Prague Lions
- Title: Defensive coordinator

Personal information
- Born: November 30, 1988 (age 37); Phoenix, Arizona, U.S.
- Listed height: 6 ft 5 in (1.96 m)
- Listed weight: 278 lb (126 kg)

Career information
- High school: Flagstaff (Flagstaff, Arizona)
- College: Arizona State (2007–2010); North Alabama (2011)
- NFL draft: 2012: undrafted

Career history

Playing
- Cologne Falcons (2013); Kozły Poznań (2014–2015); IBM Big Blue (2014–2022); Prague Lions (2016); Prague Lions (2018); Prague Lions (2023–2024)

Coaching
- Kozły Poznań (2014–2015) Defensive coordinator; Prague Black Panthers (2019-2021) Defensive coordinator; Prague Lions (2025–present) Defensive coordinator

Awards and highlights
- 7× All X-League Team (2014−2020)

James Richard Brooks (born November 30, 1988) is an American football coach and former defensive end. He is currently the defensive coordinator for the Prague Lions of the European League of Football (ELF). He played college football for the Arizona State Sun Devils and the North Alabama Lions. Brooks also played for the IBM Big Blue of the Japanese X-League.

== Career ==
Brooks attended Flagstaff High School, where he was active in basketball as well as a tight end and defensive end in football. A three-star recruit, he committed to Arizona State University in 2007. It wasn't until 14 years later that another Flagstaff athlete was recruited by an FBS college. After sitting out his redshirt freshman year, Brooks appeared in 11 games as a reserve player in 2008. By the 2009 season, Brooks developed into a regular player for the Sun Devils. In nine games, he recorded 17 tackles, three and a half sacks and one interception. In December 2010, Brooks recorded three tackles, one sack for minus-11 yards and two blocked extra points in the Territorial Cup against the Arizona Wildcats. With the score tied at 20-20, Brooks blocked the extra point attempt that sent the game into overtime. The Sun Devils ultimately won the prestigious game and Brooks was named Pac-10 Player of the Week. For his senior year, Brooks decided to transfer to the University of North Alabama for personal reasons.

Pre-draft measurables
Height	Weight
6 ft 4 5/8 in (1.95 m)	278 lb (126 kg)
Values from Pro Day

In 2013, Brooks signed his first professional contract with the Cologne Falcons in the German Football League. In 14 games, he recorded 26 tackles, including nine for loss and six sacks. In the spring of 2014, he played for Kozły Poznań in Poland and also served as the team's defensive coordinator. He then joined the IBM Big Blue from the Japanese X-League in the fall.There the Big Blue reached the X-Bowl, where the lost to the Fujitsu Frontiers. For his achievements, Brooks was elected to the All-X-League team for the first time. In 2015, he worked again as a coach and player at Kozły Poznań before returning to the Big Blue in Japan. He played for Big Blue up to and including the 2022 season. After the 2020 season, he was named an All-Star for the seventh time. In 2016 and 2018, Brooks also played for the Prague Lions in the Czech League ČLAF. During the 2019 season of the Austrian Football League, Brooks served as the defensive coordinator of the Prague Black Panthers. Although his contract was extended for another season, the Black Panthers did not take part in games in 2020 due to the COVID-19 pandemic.

For the 2023 season of the European League of Football (ELF), Brooks was hired by the Prague Lions under head coach Zach Harrod.In his first season in the ELF, Brooks had eight and a half sacks, 14 tackles for loss and four forced fumbles for the Lions. On November 24, he received another contract for the 2024 season.

On November 14, 2024, Brooks would retire from football to become the new defensive coordinator for the Prague Lions.

== Music ==
Brooks is active as a musician in the hip-hop genre under the pseudonym So Realistic. In September 2017, he released the album ViiiBE.
