= Jaime Hill =

American football coach (born 1963)

Profile
- Position: Head coach

Personal information
- Born: July 1963 (age 63); San Diego, California, U.S.

Career information
- High school: Santana High School
- College: San Francisco State University

Career history
- San Francisco State (1987) Student assistant; UTEP (1988) Graduate assistant; Northern Arizona (1989) Assistant coach/wide receivers; Sonoma State (1990–91) Defensive assistant/secondary; Chicago (1992) Defensive coordinator; Portland State (1993–96) Defensive coordinator/defensive backs; San Francisco 49ers (1997–99) DCC/defensive assistant/secondary; San Francisco Demons (2001) Secondary; Humboldt State (2002–03) Defensive coordinator; Calgary Stampeders (2003–04) Secondary coach; Ottawa Renegades (2004–06) Co-defensive coordinator; BYU (2006–10) Defensive coordinator; Portland State (2013–14) Defensive coordinator; Simon Fraser (2014–18) Defensive coordinator; São Paulo Storm (2019–2020) Head coach; Fehérvár Enthroners (2021–2023) Head coach; Seinäjoki Crocodiles (2025-) Head coach

Awards and highlights
- Hungarian Bowl champion (XVI)

Jaime Vondel Hill (born July 1963) (pronounced High-may) is an American football coach. He formerly held the position of defensive coordinator for the BYU Cougars in Provo, Utah between 2006 and 2010.

== Early life ==
Hill went to Santana High School in San Diego, where he was member of the varsity track team and participated in 440-yard dash competition. He later went on playing at Grossmont College (former JuCo) from 1982 to 83, earning him Academic All-American and first-team all-league performer. He then played as wide receiver for the Gators at San Francisco State University in 1984 and 1985, being a first team all-conference member.

== Coaching career ==
His coaching career started at his alma mater San Francisco State University in 1987 as student assistant wide receivers and later graduate assistant at UTEP in 1988.

In 1989 he became assistant coach for wide receivers and tight ends at Northern Arizona University for the Lumberjacks, being his first professional coaching job. From 1990 to 1991 he was changing to the defensive side and became defensive assistant for the secondary at Sonoma State University and further defensive coordinator at University of Chicago in 1992. His first longer stint as coach was from 1993 to 1996 at Portland State University as defensive backs coach and defensive coordinator. He was member of the NFL Bill Walsh coaching fellowship in 1992 and 1994.

Hills first job in the NFL came with the San Francisco 49ers from 1997 to 1999, first as defensive quality control and later as defensive assistant for the secondary. There, he appeared in two NFL Divisional Round play-off games and has an overall regular season record of 34–14 and play-off record of 2–2. From 2000 to 2001 he stayed in San Francisco and became secondary coach of the San Francisco Demons in the original XFL, reaching the XFL championship game but lost the Million Dollar Game against Los Angeles.

He then changed back to college football in taking the job as defensive coordinator from 2002 to 2003 for the Humboldt State University and after that going in to the CFL as the Calgary Stampeders secondary coach from '03 to '04 and Ottawa Renegades as co-defensive coordinator from '04 to '06. Later he served as defensive coordinator for the BYU Cougars football team in 2006. Following a 1–4 start to the 2010 season, BYU fired Jaime on October 2, 2010. In the 13/14 season he coached again for the Portland State Vikings and from 2014 to 2018 for the formerly known SFU Clan at Simon Fraser University in Canada.

He formerly served as head coach at São Paulo Storm (Brazil) between 2019 and 2020.

From 2021 until 2023, Hill was the head coach of the Fehérvár Enthroners, located near Budapest, Hungary. In his first two seasons, they played in the national league Hungarian American Football League (HFL) winning the league championship in 2022, and beginning with the 2023 season in the European League of Football.

== Private life ==
Hill was married to LaShanda Hill and has two daughters and one son. He holds bachelor's degree from University of Texas at El Paso in psychology and a teaching certificate from California Community College in 1990.
