= 2023 Panthers Wrocław season =

American football team in Poland

- President: Michał Latoś
- Head coach: (United States) Dave Christensen
- Home stadium: Olympic Stadium

Uniform

The 2023 Panthers Wrocław season is the third season of the Panthers Wrocław team in the European League of Football.

== Preseason ==
After the change in the front office in form of Jakub Samel, former head coach of the team and now director of sport, the franchise announced Dave Christensen as the new head coach for the new 2023 season. In preparation for the upcoming matches, the organization held a tryout at their olympic stadium. With the signings of Nik Rango and Branton Martin, national champion of the NCAA Division III in the 2021 Stagg Bowl with the Mary Hardin–Baylor Crusaders, the Panthers signed new key-players after departures of former players.

== Regular season ==
=== Standings ===
Eastern Conference
Pos	Team	GP	W	L	CONF	PF	PA	DIFF	STK	Qualification
1	(Austria) Vienna Vikings	12	12	0	10–0	414	180	+234	W12	Automatic playoffs (#2)
2	(Germany) Berlin Thunder	12	8	4	7–3	378	188	+190	W2	Advance to playoffs (#5)
3	(Poland) Panthers Wrocław	12	8	4	7–3	385	221	+164	W2	Advance to playoffs (#6)
4	(Hungary) Fehérvár Enthroners	12	3	9	3–7	218	424	–206	L2	
5	(Germany) Leipzig Kings	12	2	10	2–8	189	387	–198	L9	
6	(Czech Republic) Prague Lions	12	1	11	1–9	155	441	–286	L7	

Source: europeanleague.football

== Roster ==
Panthers Wrocław roster
Quarterbacks: 8 Steven Duncan (United States); Running backs: 22 Dawid Brzozowski (Poland); 29 Kamil Kotlarz (Poland); Wide receivers: 15 Bartosz Dziedzic (Poland); 14 Kacper Fiedziuk (Poland); 18 Adrian Gródecki (Poland); 84 Michał Goszczyński (Poland); 23 Kacper Jaszewski (Poland); 5 Maciej Krupa (Poland); 7 Matt Cole (United States); 7 Jakub Wąsiel (Poland); 82 Przemysław Banat (Poland); 88 Bruno Waszkiewwicz (Poland); 16 Wiktor Zięba (Poland); -- Jakub Mazan (Poland); Tight ends: 10 Tomasz Gajewski (Poland); 87 Mateusz Wojakiewicz (Poland); 64 Adria Botella Moreno (Spain)	Offensive linemen: 77 Otávio Amorim (Brazil); 66 Sebastian Kojkoł (Poland); 64 Konrad Orzechowski (Poland); -- Keanu Ebanks (United Kingdom); 65 Kamil Piątek (Poland); 55 Rafał Rogaczewski (Poland); Defensive linemen: 50 Szymon Adamczyk DT (Poland); 54 Stainslaw Idziak DE (Poland); 97 Łukasz Gembara DT (Poland); 96 Piotr Ostrowski (Poland); 91 Oskar Romaniuk DL (Poland); 99 Robert Rosołek DE (Poland); -- Dusan Novakovic (Poland)	Linebackers: 42 Jan Chmiel (Poland); 47 Antoni Idziak (Poland); 45 Tomasz Kiszka OLB (Poland); 6 Kamil Ruta OLB (Poland); 12 Konrad Stępień (Poland); 49 A.J. Wentland (United States); 35 Krzysztof Wis (Poland); Defensive backs: 24 William James CB (Sweden); 3 Szymon Jarmołkowicz (Poland); 3 Kacper Jazienicki (Poland); 44 Andrei Karmakskikh (Poland); 25 Adam Lary CB (Poland); 19 Daniel Piątkowski (Poland); 31 Szymon Romanowski CB (Poland); -- Devan Burrell (United States); Special teams: 7 Jakub Ałdaś K (Poland); -- Jakub Ciurkot K (Poland)	Rookies in italics Roster updated November 22, 2023; 4 A-import, 10 E-import, 39 homegrown 53 active

== Staff ==
Panthers Wrocław staff
Front office: President – Michał Latoś; General Manager – Jakub Głogowski; Chief Operating Officer - Karolina Janas; Sporting Director– Jakub Samel; Coaching advisor – Gary Kubiak; Head coach: Head coach – Dave Christensen; Offensive coaches: Offensive Coordinator – Gabriel Landa; Quarterbacks – Gabriel Landa; Wide receivers – Gabriel Landa; Running backs/Fullbacks/Tight Ends – Mason Keeler; Offensive Line – Sam Gooding	Defensive coaches: Defensive Coordinator – Craig Kuligowski; Linebackers – Dave Likins; Defensive line –; Defensive backs – Jamaal White; Special teams coaches: Special Teams Coordinator –; Specialist Coach - Paul Mokrzycki; updated 14 February 2023
