= Kyle Kitchens =

American football player (born 1996)

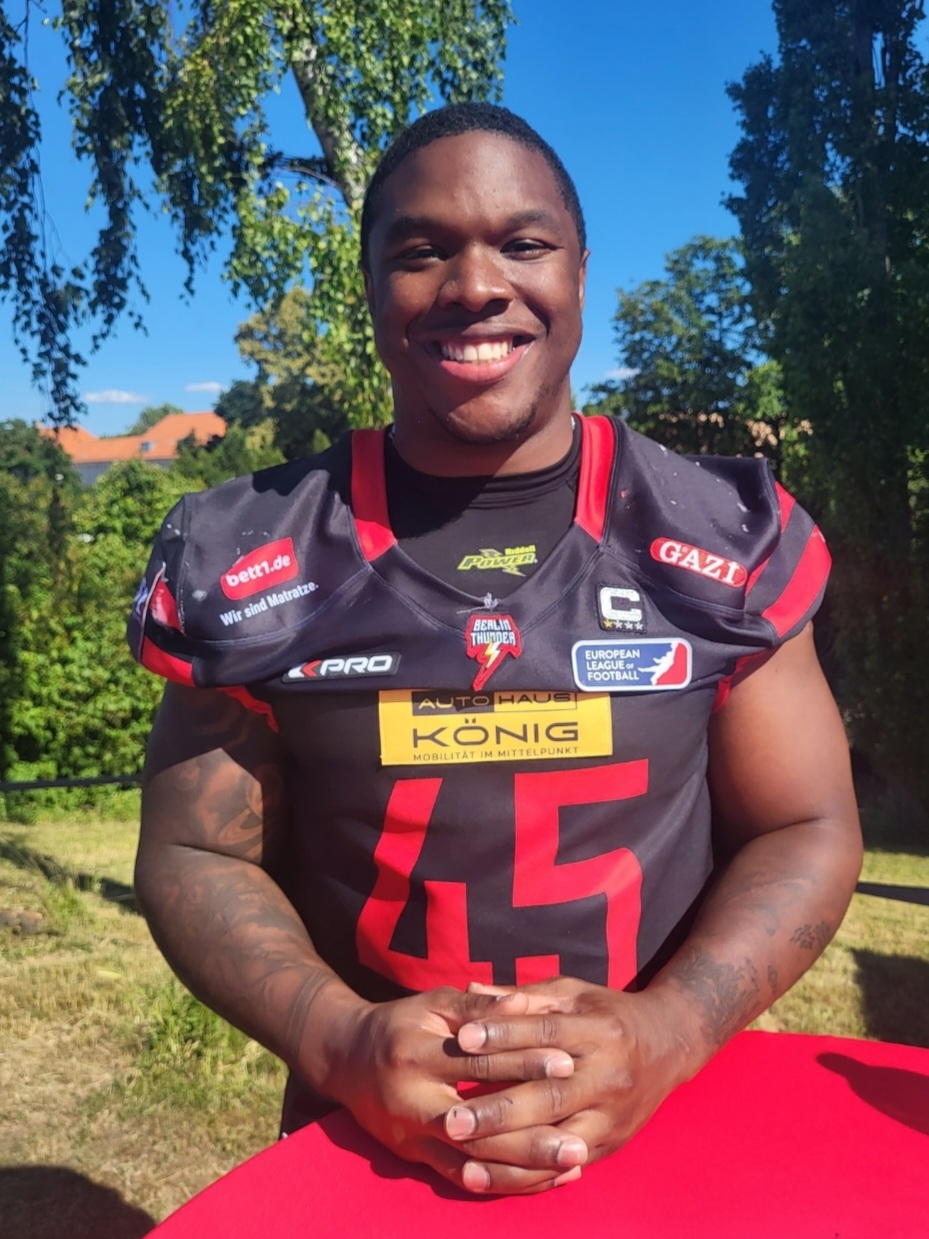
- Kitchens in 2024

No. 45 – Hamburg Sea Devils
- Position: Defensive end
- Roster status: Active

Personal information
- Born: January 25, 1996 (age 30); Decatur, Georgia, U.S.
- Listed height: 6 ft 1 in (1.85 m)
- Listed weight: 260 lb (118 kg)

Career information
- High school: Decatur
- College: Catawba (2014–2018)
- NFL draft: 2019: undrafted

Career history
- Potsdam Royals (2019); Hildesheim Invaders (2020); TSL Aviators (2020); FCF Wild Aces (2021); Leipzig Kings (2021); Berlin Thunder (2022–2024); Hamburg Sea Devils (2024–present)

Awards and highlights
- 2× ELF Defensive Player of the Year (2021, 2022); 3× ELF sacks leader (2021, 2022, 2023); First-team All-ELF (2022); GFL All-Star (2019); GFL sacks leader (2019); 3× AFCA All-American (2015, 2016, 2017); 2× SAC Defensive Player of the Year (2015, 2017); ELF records: All-time sack leader (63); All-time TFL leader (103); Most sacks in a season (16.5, 2024)

Kyle Kitchens (born January 25, 1996) is an American professional football defensive end playing for the Hamburg Sea Devils in the European League of Football (ELF). He played college football for the Catawba Indians.

== Early life and college ==
Kitchens attended Decatur High School, where he played lacrosse, basketball and baseball, besides American football for the Bulldogs. He was named two-times All-State player and was selected for the All-Region team.

For the 2014 college football season he committed to Catawba College in Salisbury, North Carolina in the NCAA Division II. There he quickly became a starter and core player in the team. He was the second overall defensive player to be named AFCA All-American Team three times in a row in NCAA Division II history. With his team, he won his conference in 2015. He left his college as an all-time sack leader (38.5) and with 71 total tackles for loss.

== Professional career ==
Kitchens began his professional career with the Potsdam Royals in the German Football League (GFL) in 2019. In 14 games total he racked up 76 tackles, 31 tackles for loss, 16 sacks und four pass-break-ups. With that he was leading the league and was named GFL North All-Star Team. For the 2020 GLF season he went to the Hildesheim Invaders, where he wasn't able to play because of the COVID-19 pandemic. He then played in The Spring League for the 2020 fall season and in early 2021 for the Wild Aces in the Fan Controlled Football league.

For the first season of the European League of Football the Leipzig Kings with head coach Fred Armstrong signed Kitchens to their roster. Whilst the Kings had a 5-5 records, Kitchens lead the league with 12.5 sacks. He was named Defensive Player of the Year and All-Star Team at the ELF Honors. In November 2021 Kitchens signed with the Berlin Thunder for the 2022 season. He was Week-MVP in week 6 and was named again DPOY and first-All-Star Team member at the ELF Honors 2022. Kitchens was the first resigning of a player for the 2023 season.

On December 2, 2024, Kitchens signed with the Hamburg Sea Devils.

=== Professional statistics ===
Year	Team	GP	Tackles					Interceptions					Fumbles		
Year	Team	GP	Total	Solo	Ast	TFL	Sack	BrUp	INT	Yds	TD	PD	FF	FR	TD
European League of Football
2021	Leipzig Kings	10	58	39	19	20.5	12.5	1	0	0	0	1	3	1	0
2022	Berlin Thunder	12	58	38	20	33.5	16.0	4	1	8	0	5	4	1	1
ELF total		22	116	77	39	54	28.5	5	1	8	0	6	7	2	1
Source: stats.europeanleague.football

== Personal life ==
Kitchens also was member of the Phi Beta Sigma fraternity at nearby Livingstone College and member of the Black Student Union on Catawba campus. He studied in an undergraduate degree in Sports Management.
