= Donovan Isom =

American football player (born 1994)

Profile
- Position: Quarterback

Personal information
- Born: October 13, 1994 (age 32); Destrehan, Louisiana, U.S.
- Listed height: 6 ft 5 in (1.96 m)
- Listed weight: 250 lb (113 kg)

Career information
- High school: Destrehan
- College: Utah (2014); Southeastern Louisiana (2015–2017); Texas Wesleyan (2018–2019)
- NFL draft: 2021: undrafted

Career history
- Berlin Rebels (2021–2022); Berlin Thunder (2023); Saint-Ouen-l'Aumône Cougars (French Elite) (2024); New Yorker Lions (2024)

Donovan Matthew Isom (pronounced ice-um) (born October 23, 1994) is an American professional football player for the New Yorker Lions in the German Football League. Previous stations included the Berlin Thunder in the European League of Football, the Berlin Rebels in the GFL, the Saint-Ouen-l'Aumône Cougars in France as well as the University of Utah, Southeastern Louisiana University and Texas Wesleyan University in college football.

== Youth and early years ==
Isom began playing football for the Destrehan High School under head coach Stephen Robichaux where he received All-State, All-Metro, District 7-5A Offensive MVP honors and Greater New Orleans Amateur Athlete of the month in September as senior. In his last year, he threw for 2,600 yards and 33 touchdowns with just two interceptions. He also showed strong runnings skills, with 82 rushing attempts for 530 yards (6.6 average) and nine touchdowns.

He also lettered in Basketball at DHS.

== College football ==
Out of high school he committed to the University of Utah football program. He redshirted the 2014 season and didn't see game action for the Utes. In the 2015 season, he transferred to Southeastern Louisiana University and played in five games, starting in two of them. The following year, he didn't produce any stats. In the 2017 season, he was only starting one game for the Lions.

In 2018 then transferred again to the Texas Wesleyan University in the NAIA, helping them revitalizing the football program, which was reinstated in 2017. There he finished his college career in 2019 with 2,300 passing yards, 21 total touchdowns in 12 games.

=== College statistics ===
Year	Team	GP	Passing							Rushing			
Year	Team	GP	Cmp	Att	Pct	Yds	Y/A	TD	Int	Att	Yds	Avg	TD
College Division I FBS
2014	Utah Utes	0	0	0	0%	0	0	0	0	0	0	0	0
College Division I FCS
2015	Southeastern Louisiana Lions	5	34	61	55.7%	344	10.1	2	2	47	132	2.8	0
2016	Southeastern Louisiana Lions	0	0	0	0%	0	0	0	0	0	0	0	0
2017	Southeastern Louisiana Lions	1	11	23	47.8%	93	8.5	0	3	5	86	17.2	0
NAIA
2018	TWU Rams	9	115	238	48.3%	1,701	14.8	13	5	55	-11	-0.2	2
2019	TWU Rams	3	46	90	51.1%	597	13.0	5	1	7	110	15.7	1
College total		18	206	412	50.0%	2.735	13.3	20	11	197	317	1.6	3
Source: lionsports.net, ramsports.net

== Professional football ==
Without any football action in 2020 due to the COVID-19-pandemic, he signed to play for the Berlin Rebels in the German Football League as a professional import. In the 2021 and 2022 season, he started in 15 games, rushing for 11 touchdowns and passing for 29 touchdowns.

In the 2023 ELF season, he was signed by the Berlin Thunder franchise. He passed for 587 yards, 9 passing touchdowns against 2 interceptions in 4 games.

In 2024, Isom signed with the Saint-Ouen-l'Aumône Cougars of the Division 1 Elite Championship in France. Isom completed 60 percent of his passes and threw for 486 yards, three touchdowns, three interceptions in 4 games with the Cougars before he was released by the team. He was then signed by the New Yorker Lions in the GFL.

== Private life ==
Isom is son of Denise Isom and brother of Jasmaine Isom. He majored in communication and graduated in 2018 from Southeastern Louisiana University.
