= Dům Radost =

- Palác všeobecného penzijního ústavu
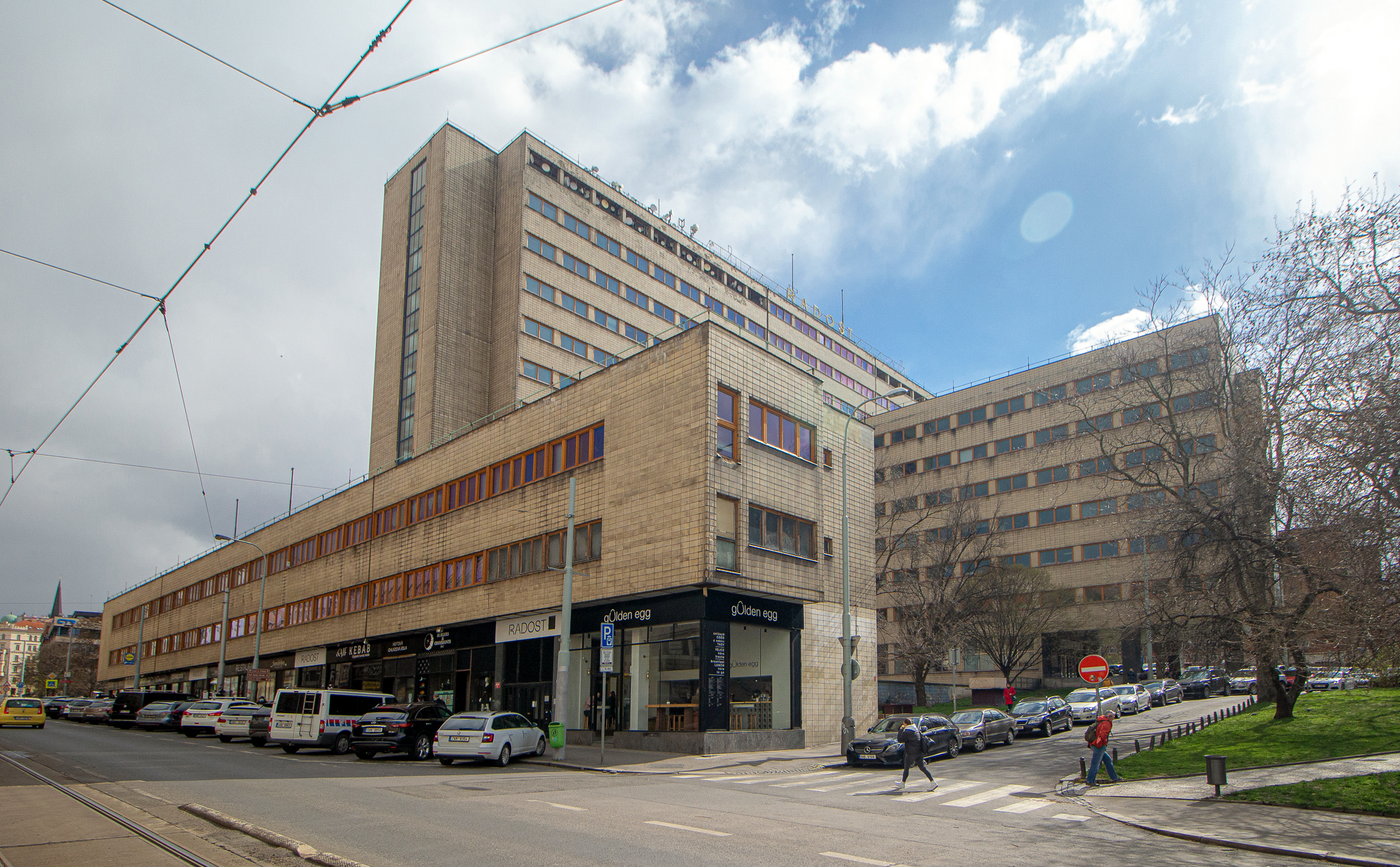
- Dům Radost in 2023
- Interactive map of the Dům Radost area
- Former names: Dům odborových svazů

General information
- Architectural style: Functionalism
- Location: Žižkov, Prague 3, náměstí Winstona Churchilla 1800/2
- Coordinates: 50°5′4″N 14°26′33″E
- Construction started: 1932
- Completed: 1934

Height
- Height: 53 metres (174 ft)

Technical details
- Floor count: 13

Design and construction
- Architects: Karel Honzík, Josef Havlíček

Dům Radost (translated from Czech: House of Joy) is a functionalist building in Prague, Czech Republic. It is located next to Winston Churchill square in Žižkov district. It was built between 1932 and 1934. This 52-metre-high (171 ft) building with 13 floors and a cruciform floor plan inspired by French architect Le Corbusier was once the tallest office building in the country. The complex serves as offices, apartments, theater, cinema, cafe and observatory since 2019. Since 1964, it is a cultural monument of the Czech Republic.

== Name ==
The building is historically known as Dům odborových svazů (translated as House of Trade Unions) or palác Všeobecného penzijního ústavu (translated as General Pension Administration Palace). Sometimes, it is also called as kachlíkárna (badly translated as Tile Factory, better as Tile House) due to its facade.
