= 2023 Leipzig Kings season =

Season of European gridiron football

- General manager: Moritz Heisler
- Head coach: (United States) John Booker
- Home stadium: Alfred-Kunze-Sportpark

Uniform

The 2023 Leipzig Kings season is the third season of the Leipzig Kings in the European League of Football history.

== Preseason ==
After the two seasons, the management decided to part ways with head coach Fred Armstrong, after a troublesome seasons with many injuries of key position players. A week later, Kings former offensive coordinator John Booker was introduced as the new head coach for the 2023 season.

After three different starting quarterbacks in the previous season, the Kings seek stability on this position with the signing of Kenyatte Allen from the GFL team Allgäu Comets. New and re-signings followed suit with defensive cornerstones Aslan Zetterberg, AJ Wentland, Lance Leota and AFI's defensive All-Star Roedion Henrique.

== Regular season ==
The Kings were removed from the league after week 6. This came after a two week saga, which include the team suggesting they will "most likely have to stop competing in the European League of Football" after their loan requested was denied by the league and cancelling the upcoming week 6 home match with Prague Lions. The Kings would later announce their withdrawal from the league on July 11, 2023. A day later the ELF announced that the team will be taken out of the league for the remainder of the 2023 season and their license to participate in the European League of Football was "withdrawn", but would like to accept the team back for the 2024 season, if a suitable new owners will be found.

All players from the roster were listed as free agents and were able to signed with other league franchises.

=== Standings ===
Eastern Conference
Pos	Team	GP	W	L	CONF	PF	PA	DIFF	STK	Qualification
1	(Austria) Vienna Vikings	12	12	0	10–0	414	180	+234	W12	Automatic playoffs (#2)
2	(Germany) Berlin Thunder	12	8	4	7–3	378	188	+190	W2	Advance to playoffs (#5)
3	(Poland) Panthers Wrocław	12	8	4	7–3	385	221	+164	W2	Advance to playoffs (#6)
4	(Hungary) Fehérvár Enthroners	12	3	9	3–7	218	424	–206	L2	
5	(Germany) Leipzig Kings	12	2	10	2–8	189	387	–198	L9	
6	(Czech Republic) Prague Lions	12	1	11	1–9	155	441	–286	L7	

Source: europeanleague.football

== Roster ==
Leipzig Kings roster
Quarterbacks: Kenyatte Allen (United States); 3 Ferras El-Hendi (Germany); Running backs: Maurice Baker (Germany); Leander Carstensen (Germany); Steve McShane (United States); Niklas Ritter FB (Germany); Wide receivers: Noah Bomba (Germany); Luis Moreno (Germany); Kélian Mouliom (Germany); Leander Winter (Germany); Tight ends: Al Mustafa Khalid Almakki FB (Germany); Domenik Rofalski WR (Germany); Jens Walter (Germany)	Offensive linemen: Dominik Behrens (Germany); 74 Tilman Brütsch C (Germany); Joel Coenes (Germany); Austine Igba Ujene (Nigeria); 68 Pollys Junio Sacramento T (Brazil); Defensive linemen: Felix Delgado (Germany); Nico Koch (Germany); 97 Lance Leota DT (New Zealand); Carlo Reimann (Germany); 92 Aslan Zetterberg DT (Sweden)	Linebackers: Niels Schroedter (Germany); 49 A.J. Wentland ILB (United States); Defensive backs: Devan Burrell (United States); 4 Roedion Henrique S (Netherlands); Zil Jalaal Isaac-Turea (Germany); 24 William James CB (Sweden); René Merkel (Germany); Dominic Yaw Aboagye-Duah (Germany)	Rookies in italics Roster updated 23 March 2023; 4 A-import, 5 E-import, 22 homegrown 31 active

=== Transactions ===
From Hamburg Sea Devils: Dominik Behrens
From Stuttgart Surge: Noah Bomba
From Berlin Thunder: Kélian-Mathis Mouliom

== Staff ==
Leipzig Kings staff
Front office: Owner – Moritz Heisler, Marc Quoadt; General manager – Moritz Heisler; Director of Strategy Development – Karsten Köhler; Director of football operations – John Alexander Booker; Head coach: Head coach – John Alexander Booker; Offensive coaches: Offensive coordinator – n/a; Offensive line – n/a; Quarterbacks – Elijah Miller; Running backs – n/a; Wide receivers/tight ends – n/a	Defensive coaches: Defensive coordinator/defensive backs – David Shelton Sr.; Linebacker – n/a; Defensive line – n/a; Special teams coaches: Special teams coordinator – n/a; Strength and conditioning: Head strength and conditioning – n/a; updated 23 March 2023
