= 2023 Vienna Vikings season =

2023 season of the ELF team Vienna Vikings

- President: Karl Wurm
- Head coach: (United States) Chris Calaycay

Uniform

The 2023 Vienna Vikings season is the second season of the defending champion Vienna Vikings in the third season of the European League of Football.

== Preseason ==
For the new season, the coaching staff and front office demonstrated stability in continuing their work. In contrast, the main sponsor Automobile Dacia didn't extended the contract with the club and franchise. The team will also change conferences, playing in the Eastern Conference without its longterm rival Raiders Tirol, but still having inter-conference games.

== Regular season ==
=== Standings ===
Eastern Conference
Pos	Team	GP	W	L	CONF	PF	PA	DIFF	STK	Qualification
1	(Austria) Vienna Vikings	12	12	0	10–0	414	180	+234	W12	Automatic playoffs (#2)
2	(Germany) Berlin Thunder	12	8	4	7–3	378	188	+190	W2	Advance to playoffs (#5)
3	(Poland) Panthers Wrocław	12	8	4	7–3	385	221	+164	W2	Advance to playoffs (#6)
4	(Hungary) Fehérvár Enthroners	12	3	9	3–7	218	424	–206	L2	
5	(Germany) Leipzig Kings	12	2	10	2–8	189	387	–198	L9	
6	(Czech Republic) Prague Lions	12	1	11	1–9	155	441	–286	L7	

Source: europeanleague.football

== Roster ==
Vienna Vikings roster
Quarterbacks: 8 Chris Helbig (United States); 12 Alexander Reischl (Austria); Running backs: 24 Karri Pajarinen (Finland); 5 Anton Wegan (Austria); 3 Florian Wegan (Austria); 29 Kevin Wojta (Austria); Wide receivers: 83 Flaviu Andrisan (Austria); 4 Jordan Bouah (Italy); 10 Weston Carr (United States); 17 Philipp Dubravec (Austria); 83 Emil Eckerstorfer (Austria); 6 Radim Kalous (Czech Republic); 18 Raphael Komeyli (Austria); 11 Michael Schachermayr (Austria); 14 Johannes Schültz (Austria); 82 Florian Simsik (Austria); Tight ends: 89 Florian Bierbaumer (Austria); 15 Rudi-Lee Frey (Austria); 88 Mortiz Schmahel (Austria); 88 Daniel Schönet (Austria)	Offensive linemen: 56 Matthew Daltrey C (United Kingdom); 78 Robert Dragotinits T (Austria); 57 Michael Haider T (Austria); 71 Lukas Holub T (Austria); 65 Mike Janda G (Austria); 53 Florian Markus G (Austria); 61 Aleksandar Milanovic T (Austria); 79 Benjamin Rab G (Austria); 77 David Rauter G (Austria); 51 Clemens Walz G (Austria); Defensive linemen: 9 Jamarcus Henderson DE (United States); 94 Florian Grünsteidl DE (Austria); 52 Oskar Kranich DE (Austria); 90 Leo Misangumukini DE (Austria); 91 Bernhard Mosor DT (Austria); 99 Maximilian Müllner DT (Austria); 75 Daniel Pozarek DT (Austria); 95 Florian Sudi DT (Austria); 96 Marvin Wappl DT (Austria)	Linebackers: 42 Moritz Elmauthaler ILB (Austria); 44 Matthias Eriksson (Sweden); 33 Sebastian Ernst (Austria); 44 Leon Huber ILB (Austria); 41 Dustin Illetschko ILB (Austria); 30 Marcel Kovarik ILB (Austria); 39 Valentine Leutgeb (Austria); 40 Thomas Schnurrer ILB (Austria); 45 Matthias Stadlmann ILB (Austria); 48 Noah Swancar ILB (Austria); 49 Alex Watholowitsch ILB (Austria); Defensive backs: 7 Exavier Edwards S (United States); 25 Linus Ganter CB (Austria); 21 Leonhard Gerner CB (Austria); 32 Luis Horvath S (Austria); 27 Nikolaus Huszar CB (Austria); 20 Florian Jobst CB (Austria); 22 Christoph Kellner CB (Austria); 26 Elmeri Laalo CB (Finland); 25 Max Morawetz CB (Austria); 28 Sebastian Schrenk CB (Austria); 23 Benjamin Straight S (Austria); 36 Fabio Zvonimir Tartarotti CB (Austria); 37 Sebastian Wimmer CB (Austria); Special teams: 19 Oskar Hertz (Austria); 14 Caspar Prill (Austria); 2 Dennis Tasic (Hungary)	Rookies in italics Roster updated 21 November 2023; 4 A-import, 7 E-import, 56 homegrown 66 active

== Staff ==
Vienna Vikings staff
Front office: Owners – Constantin Burkheiser, Markus Kraetschmer, Robin Lumsden, AFC Dacia Vienna Vikings e.V.; President – Karl Wurm; Vice president – Michael Holub; General Manager – Lukas Leitner; Head coach: Head coach – Chris Calaycay; Assistant head coach – Benjamin Sobotka; Offensive coaches: Offensive coordinator/quarterbacks – John Shannon; Running backs – Marianne Pahkala; Wide receivers/tight ends – n/a; Offensive line – Thomas Tippold; Offensive analyst – Norm Chow	Defensive coaches: Defensive coordinator/linebacker – Daniel Auböck; Defensive line – Benjamin Sobotka; Defensive backs – n/a; Special teams coaches: Special teams coordinator – n/a; Strength and conditioning: Head strength and conditioning – Marianne Pahkala; updated 23 March 2023
