= Estadi Olímpic de Terrassa =

Football stadium in Spain

Coordinates: 41°34′34.08″N 2°0′40.11″E

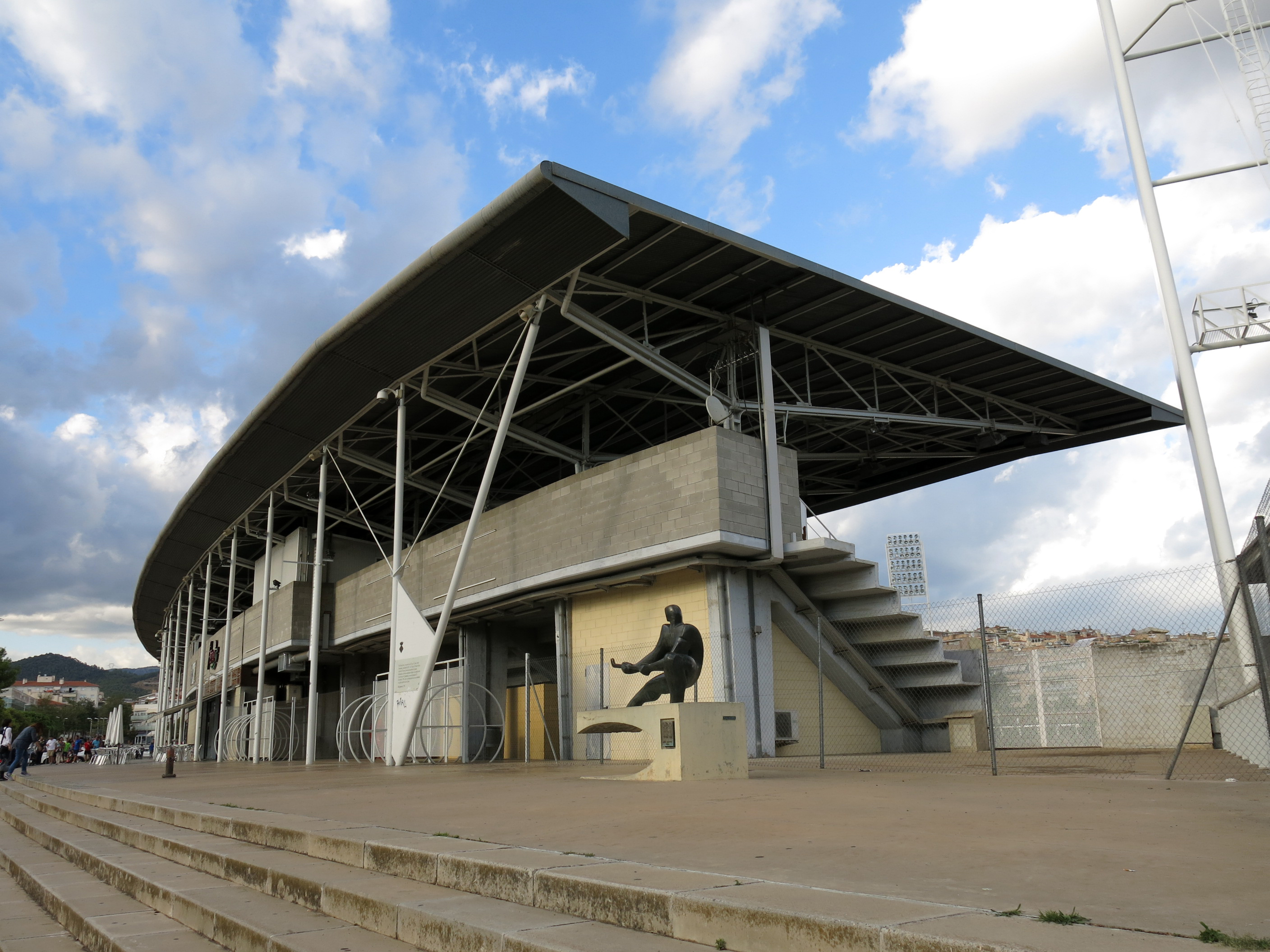
- Interactive map of Estadi Olímpic de Terrassa
- Location: Terrassa, Catalonia, Spain
- Capacity: 7,500
- Surface: Grass

Construction
- Opened: 1955; 71 years ago
- Renovated: 1991; 35 years ago

Tenants
- Terrassa FC; Barcelona Dragons (2023)

The Estadi Olímpic de Terrassa is a stadium in Terrassa, Catalonia, Spain. It is currently used for football matches and is the home stadium of Terrassa FC. The stadium holds 7,500 spectators.

The venue hosted the field hockey competitions for the 1992 Summer Olympics. Built in 1955, it was renovated in 1991 for those games. It was also used in a friendly match between the Catalonia national football team and Costa Rica on May 24, 2006, in which Catalonia won 2–0. The stadium was one of the hosts of the 2022 Women's FIH Hockey World Cup.

It was home of the Barcelona Dragons in the 2023 European League of Football season.
