= Prague Lions =

Czech professional American football team

- Current season
- Logo
- Uniforms

General information
- Founded: 1991
- Headquartered: Prague, Czech Republic
- Colors: Velvet, White, Gray

Personnel
- Owner: Mason Parker
- General manager: Mason Parker
- Head coach: James Brooks

Team history
- Prague Lions (1991–present)

Home fields
- FK Viktoria Stadion (1991–present)

League / conference affiliations
- Czech League of American Football (1994–2022) European League of Football (2023–2025): Eastern Conference (2023–2024); East Division (2025); European Football Alliance (2026–present)

Championships
- League championships: 6: Czech Bowl: 1998, 2004, 2005, 2006, 2019, 2022

The Prague Lions are an American football team based in Prague, the Czech Republic. The team plays in the European Football Alliance. The team was founded in 1991. It formerly played in the European League of Football from 2023 to 2025 and the Czech League of American Football from 1994 to 2022. In 2026 the team joined the European Football Alliance.

== History ==
=== Czech League of American Football (1994–2022) ===
The Prague Lions won Czech League of American Football (Czech Bowl) six times: 1998, 2004–2006, 2019 and 2022.

=== European League of Football (2023–2025) ===
==== 2023 season ====
2023 Prague Lions season
- President: Michal Kozlíček 🇨🇿
- Head coach: Zach Harrod 🇺🇸
- Home stadium: eFotbal Arena

Results
- Record: 1-11
- Playoffs: DNQ

The 2023 season was the first season of the Prague Lions in the European League of Football for the 2023 season, after winning the Czech Bowl multiple years and the year prior.

Coming into the season, the team reorganized into an ELF franchise. President of the club, Michal Kozlíček, was promoted to serve as president of the newly private organization. The team also re-signed with longterm head coach Zach Harrod. The Lions continue maintain a development team in the Czech league. Several players from the club team later signed contracts with the franchise for the 2023 season, including homegrown wide receiver Josef Janota.

Eastern Conference
Pos	Team	GP	W	L	CONF	PF	PA	DIFF	STK	Qualification
1	(Austria) Vienna Vikings	12	12	0	10–0	414	180	+234	W12	Automatic playoffs (#2)
2	(Germany) Berlin Thunder	12	8	4	7–3	378	188	+190	W2	Advance to playoffs (#5)
3	(Poland) Panthers Wrocław	12	8	4	7–3	385	221	+164	W2	Advance to playoffs (#6)
4	(Hungary) Fehérvár Enthroners	12	3	9	3–7	218	424	–206	L2	
5	(Germany) Leipzig Kings	12	2	10	2–8	189	387	–198	L9	
6	(Czech Republic) Prague Lions	12	1	11	1–9	155	441	–286	L7	

Source: europeanleague.football

Prague Lions roster
Quarterbacks: 2 Shazzon Mumphrey (United States); Running backs: David Kilián (Czech Republic); Adam Žouželka (Czech Republic); Wide receivers: Brandon Butler Jr (Germany); Josef Janota (Czech Republic); Lukáš Kadlec (Czech Republic); Aymeric Nicault (France); Pavel Ševeček (Czech Republic); Marek Suchý (Czech Republic); Vic Wharton III (United States); Tight ends: Martin Havelka (Czech Republic); Eden Thiede-Palmer (United Kingdom)	Offensive linemen: Josef Fuksa (Czech Republic); Michal Knotek (Czech Republic); Miroslav Kysilka (Czech Republic); Zbyněk Kysilka (Czech Republic); Jan Rauš (Czech Republic); David Šaněk (Czech Republic); Defensive linemen: James Brooks (United States); Marek Daník (Czech Republic); Jakub Ječný (Czech Republic); Jan Lipták (Czech Republic); Jakub Smutný (Czech Republic); Jan Starý (Czech Republic); Zaire Ugapo (New Zealand)	Linebackers: Kamel Eltifi (Czech Republic); Tomáš Pazourek (Czech Republic); Emmanuel Falola (United Kingdom); Defensive backs: Aleksandar Borković (Serbia); Jakub Brejcha (Czech Republic); Aleš Drhlík (Czech Republic); Daniel Feuereisel (Czech Republic); Charun Jachjajev (Czech Republic); Jan Krs (Czech Republic); Rogria Lewis (United States); Lukáš Růžek (Czech Republic); Lukáš Rokošný (Czech Republic)	Rookies in italics Roster updated 23 March 2023; 4 A-import, 6 E-import, 27 homegrown 37 active

==== 2025 season ====
2025 Prague Lions season
- General manager: (United States) Mason Parker
- Head coach: (United States) Dave Warner
- Offensive coordinator: (United States) Dave Warner
- Defensive coordinator: (United States) James Brooks
- Home stadium: FK Viktoria Stadion

Results
- Record: 7-5
- Playoffs: DNQ

The 2025 Prague Lions season was the third season of the Prague Lions in the European League of Football for the 2025 season.

After finishing the previous season 1-11, Lions signed Dave Warner as head coach for the 2025 season. Warner won the 2014 Rose Bowl and the 2015 Cotton Bowl with Michigan State. In 2024 he was Offensive Coordinator of the Madrid Bravos. Defensive Coordinator was former defensive end James Brooks.

For Quarterback they signed Javarian Smith from the Hamburg Seas Devils. Other notable signings include Wide Receiver Willie Patterson, defensive back Ken Hike Jr., and defensive back Ja'Len Embry. The Lions also managed to sign some players from the Prague Black Panthers, winners of the 2024 Austrian Bowl, and a partner of the Czech Association of American Football (ČAAF).

After two home losses against Vienna and Hamburg, the Lions won 40-0 versus the Fehérvár Enthroners, the only team the Lions had won against in ELF history. In the following weeks, Prague won in Wrocław, Hamburg, and Frankfurt, so for the first time, the Prague Lions had a positive record. After a loss to division leader Vienna, the Lions missed their very first home win against Wrocław in week 9. But this followed the following week against Fehervar.

After a win at the Helvetic Mercenaries standing at 6-4, the Lions were still in the playoff run. In week 13, they played Frankfurt at home for a decisive game. After a triple lead by the Lions, the game was tied at the end of the regular season. In overtime, Frankfurt won the game. Theoretically, Prague had still a small chance to enter the postseason and ended the season with a 7-5 record after a 69-12 home win versus Helvetic. However, with a rank of 8, they missed the six-team playoffs.

East Division
Pos	Team	GP	W	L	DIV	PF	PA	DIFF	STK	Qualification
1	Vienna Vikings	12	11	1	6–0	463	232	+231	W7	
2	Prague Lions	12	7	5	3–3	357	240	+117	W1	
3	Panthers Wrocław	12	5	7	3–3	372	376	-4	L4	
4	Fehérvár Enthroners	12	1	11	0–6	184	509	−325	L1	

Source: europeanleague.football

Week	Date	Opponent (Note: Intra-Conference opponents are in italics)	Result	Record	Venue	Att.	Recap
1	May 18	Vienna Vikings	6-28	0–1	Stadion FK Viktoria Žižkov	1000	
2	May 24	Hamburg Sea Devils	13-28	0-2	Stadion FK Viktoria Žižkov	600	
3	May 31	at Fehérvár Enthroners	40-0	1–2	First Field, Székesfehervar	1200	
4	June 8	at Panthers Wrocław	45-13	2–2	Stadion Olimpijski, Wroclaw	2850	
5	bye						
6	June 22	Hamburg Sea Devils	19-14	3–2	Stadion Hoheluft, Hamburg	1800	
7	June 29	at Frankfurt Galaxy	37-16	4–2	PSD Bank Arena, Frankfurt	6221	
8	July 5	at Vienna Vikings	0-34	4–3	Datenpol Arena, Maria Enzersdorf	3827	
9	July 13	Panthers Wrocław	37-41	4-4	Stadion FK Viktoria Žižkov	1061	
10	July 19	Fehérvár Enthroners	10-6	5–4	Stadion FK Viktoria Žižkov	708	
11	July 27	at Helvetic Mercenaries	60-20	6-4	Lidl Arena, Wil	1452	
12	bye						
13	August 10	Frankfurt Galaxy	21-28 OT	6-5	Stadion FK Viktoria Žižkov		Gamebook
14	August 17	Helvetic Mercenaries	69-12	7-5	Stadion FK Viktoria Žižkov		

Source: elfdata.eu

2025 Prague Lions roster roster
Quarterbacks: (United States) Javarian Smith QB; Running backs: 11 (Czech Republic) Adam Žouželka RB; (Czech Republic) Pavel Juhasz RB; Wide receivers: 7 (Czech Republic) Radim Kalous WR; 14 (Czech Republic) David Lukšan WR; 17 (Czech Republic) Lukáš Kadlec WR; 18 (Czech Republic) Filip Kažmír WR; 19 (Czech Republic) Josef Janota WR; 44 (Czech Republic) Michal Krátký WR; 82 (Czech Republic) Ondřej Chmela WR; (United States) Willie Patterson WR; (Czech Republic) Matyas Bily WR; Tight ends: 84 (Czech Republic) Martin Havelka TE; 85 (Czech Republic) Robert Valík TE; 88 (Czech Republic) Pavel Ševeček TE	Offensive linemen: 65 (Slovakia) Oliver Ďurč T; 69 (Czech Republic) Jaroslav Hrdlička T; 74 (Czech Republic) Adam Masopust G; (United Kingdom) Louis Burghes T; (United Kingdom) Benjamin Burghes OL; (Germany) Jasper Friis; (Brazil) Lucas Soares da Silva T; Defensive linemen: 23 (Czech Republic) Jakub Ječný DE; 24 (Slovakia) Lukáš Korim DE; 41 (Czech Republic) Jonáš Hlava DL; 43 (Czech Republic) Marek Daník DE; 90 (Czech Republic) Jan Starý DE; 91 (Czech Republic) Jan Lipták DT; 92 (Czech Republic) Jakub Janoušek DT; 93 (Czech Republic) Daniel Pohořalý DE; 95 (Czech Republic) Tomáš Jenček DT; 96 (Czech Republic) Martin Koval DT; 97 (Czech Republic) Jan Vitvar DT; 99 (Czech Republic) Jakub Smutný DT	Linebackers: 0 (United Kingdom) Arthur Kingdom LB; 23 (Czech Republic) Jakub Ječný LB; 40 (Czech Republic) Tomáš Pazourek LB; 50 (Czech Republic) Ondřej Kyloušek LB; 52 (Czech Republic) Šimon Škrabiš LB; Defensive backs: 3 (United States) Ja'Len Embry CB; 4 (United States) Ken Hike Jr. DB; 5 (Czech Republic) Aleš Drhlík FS; 6 (Czech Republic) Antonín Kvapil CB; 8 (Czech Republic) Jan Krs FS; 8 (Czech Republic) Jakub Rada CB; 22 (Czech Republic) Charun Jachjajev CB; 24 (Slovakia) Lukáš Korim DE; 26 (Czech Republic) Štĕpán Švec CB; 32 (Argentina) Lautaro Frecha SS; Special teams: 80 (Czech Republic) Marek Hruboň K/P	Rookies in italics updated June 28, 2025; 4 A-import, 6 E-import, 38 homegrown 48 active, 0 practice squad

=== European Football Alliance (2026) ===
On September 9, the team announced their participation in the newly formed European Football Alliance.

==== 2026 season ====
The 2026 Prague Lions season is the fourth season of the Prague Lions on European level and the inaugural season of the European Football Alliance.

2026 Prague Lions season
- General manager: Mason Parker (United States)
- Head coach: (United States) James Brooks
- Offensive coordinator: (United States) Fred Armstrong (until week 2) (United States) Dave Warner (from week 3)
- Defensive coordinator: (United States) James Brooks
- Home stadium: FK Viktoria Stadion

After the 2025 season, the Prague Lions left the European League of Football together with almost all other top clubs. The Lions joined the newly founded European Football Alliance.

New Lions Head Coach for the 2026 season is James Brooks, former Lions defensive coordinator and previously Lions player. As starting quarterback, the Lions signed Jaylon Henderson, who played for the Paris Musketeers in 2025. Fred Armstrong joined as Offensive Coordinator.

The Lions started the season with two away losses in Copenhagen and Paris. Due to personal reasons Offensive Coordinator Armstrong left after week 2, and was replaced by former head coach Dave Warner.

Pos	Team	Pld	W	L	PF	PA	PD	Qualification
1	z – Nordic Storm	10	9	1	411	141	+270	Qualification to BIG4
2	x – Munich Ravens	10	9	1	396	228	+168	Qualification to BIG4
3	x – Frankfurt Galaxy	10	4	6	233	313	−80	Qualification to BIG4
4	x – Paris Musketeers	10	4	6	215	300	−85	Qualification to BIG4
5	e – Raiders Tirol	10	2	8	264	362	−98	
6	e – Prague Lions	10	2	8	223	398	−175	

Source: European Leagues Football Data Lab

Tiebreaker: Total Wins, Winning Percentage, Head-to-Head Record, Strength of Victory (SOV), Total Points Differential (capped at ±35 points per game), Total Points Scored, Points Differential in Head-to-Head Games, Away Wins, Coin Toss.
Legend

x — Clinched playoff berth
z — Clinched regular season winner
e — Eliminated from playoffs

===== Schedule =====
Week	Date	Opponent	Result	Record	Venue	Att.	Recap
1	May 16	at Nordic Storm	13-47	0-1	Gladsaxe Stadion, Søborg	1,800	
2	May 23	at Paris Musketeers	9-30	0-2	Stade Bauer, Saint-Ouen	2,592	
3	bye						
4	June 7	Nordic Storm	14-40	0-3	Ďolíček Stadium		
5	June 14	at Munich Ravens	13-45	0-4	Uhlsport Park, Unterhaching	3,161	
6	June 21	at Frankfurt Galaxy	18-31	0-5	PSD Bank Arena, Frankfurt am Main	4,519	
7	June 27	at Raiders Tirol	45-44	1-5	Tivoli Stadion Tirol, Innsbruck	2,326	
8	bye						
9	July 11	Paris Musketeers	36-35	2-5	Stadion FK Viktoria Žižkov		
10	July 18	Munich Ravens	12-48	2-6	Stadion FK Viktoria Žižkov		
11	bye						
12	August 2	Raiders Tirol	29-41	2-7	Stadion FK Viktoria Žižkov		
13	August 9	Frankfurt Galaxy	34-37	2-8	Stadion FK Viktoria Žižkov		
