= FK Viktoria Stadion =

Football stadium in Prague, Czech Republic

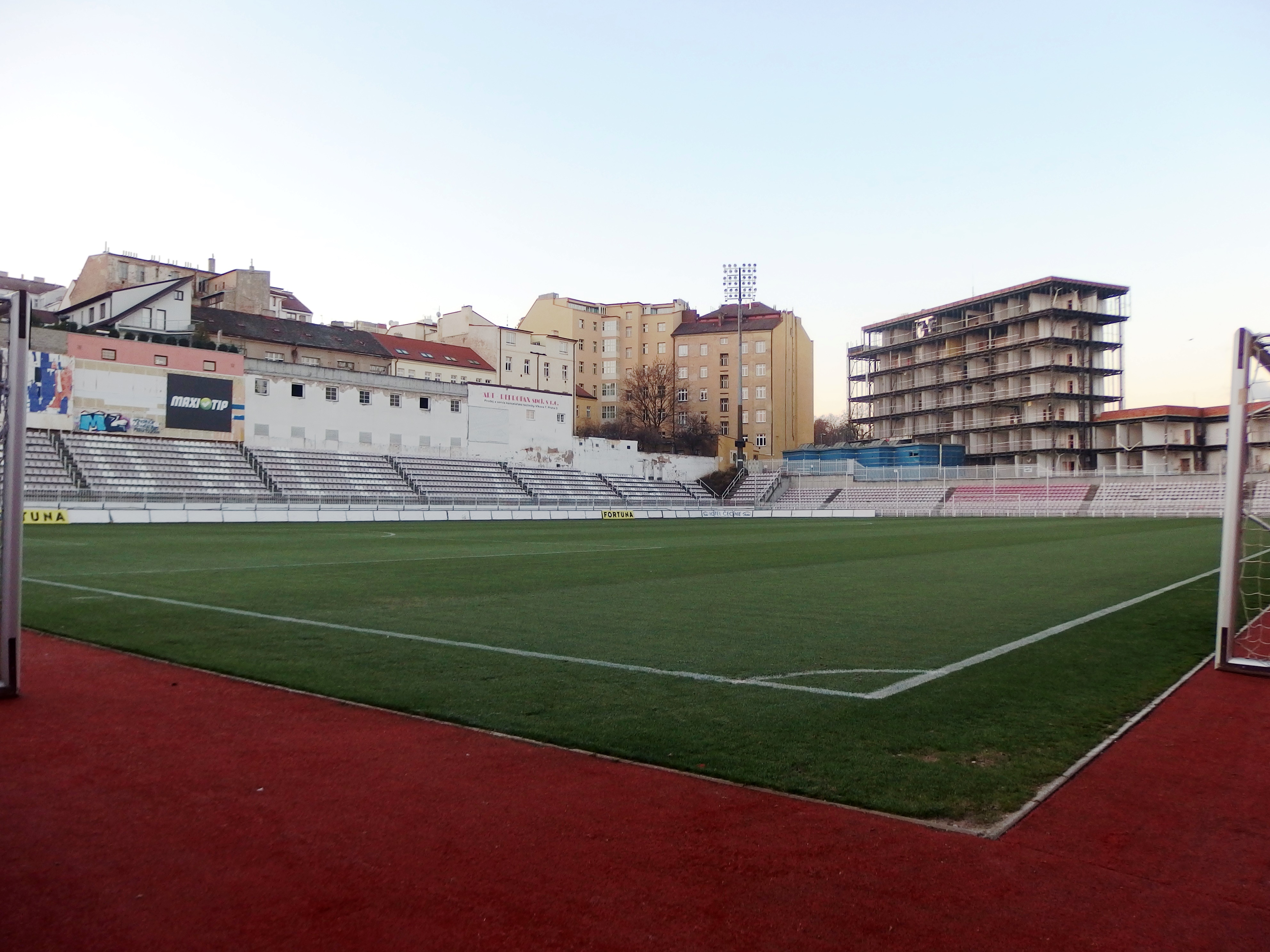
- Interactive map of FK Viktoria Stadion
- Location: Seifertova třída Prague, Czech Republic, 130 00
- Coordinates: 50°05′02.10″N 14°26′40.58″E
- Capacity: 2,799
- Surface: Grass
- Field size: 105m x 68m

Construction
- Opened: 1952
- Renovated: 2002, 2003, 2007

Tenants
- FK Viktoria Žižkov; SK Slavia Prague B AC Sparta Prague B (2022–2026); Prague Lions

The FK Viktoria Stadion is a multi-use stadium in Prague, Czech Republic. It is used mostly for football matches and is the home ground of FK Viktoria Žižkov. The stadium holds 2,799 people, all seated.

== History ==
In 1965 and 1966, the stadium held motorcycle speedway and was used by the Victoria Speedway Club Praha.

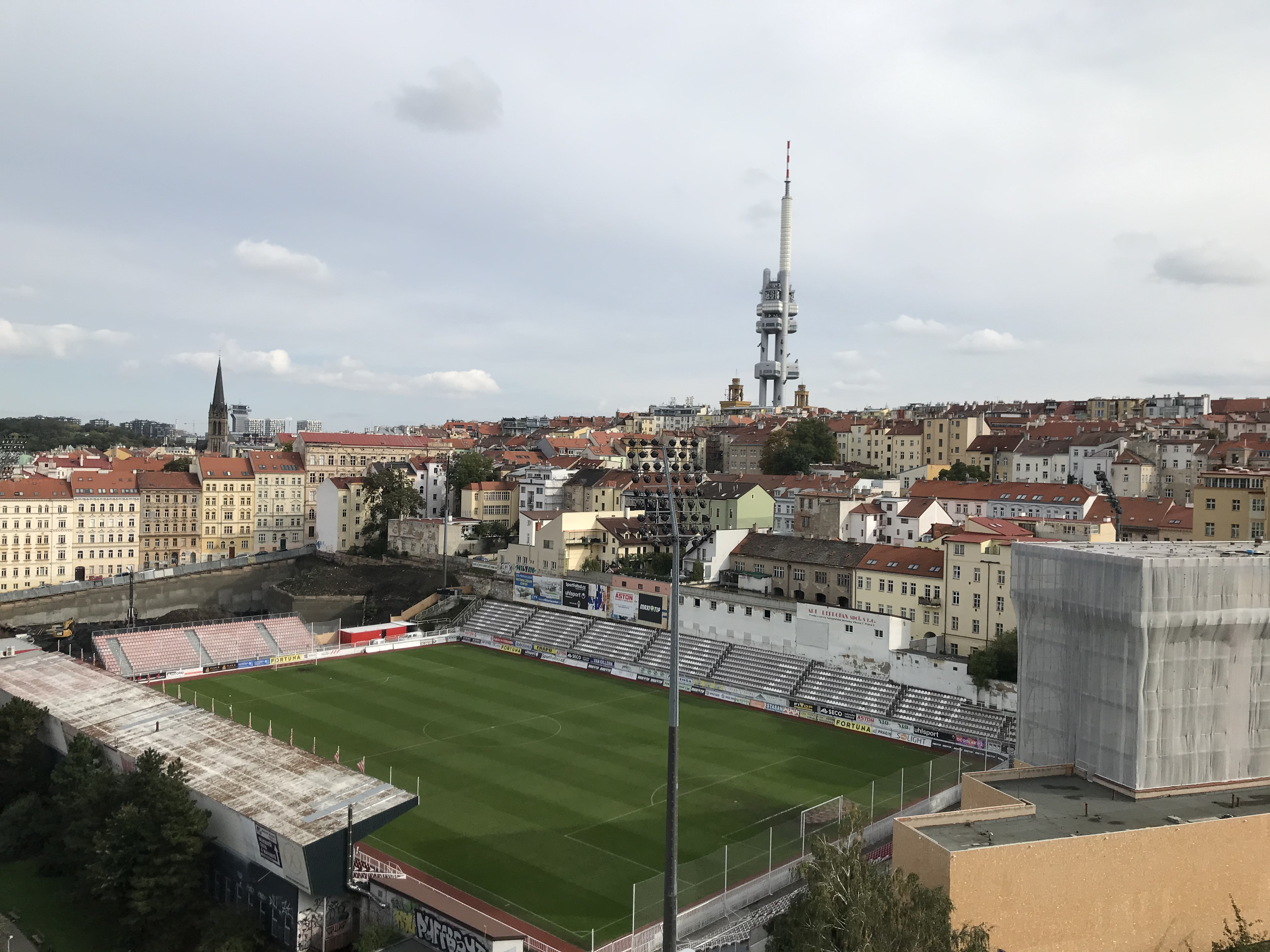
Stadium viewed from dům Radost, Žižkov district in the background

In 2007, the football club opened a shop at the stadium for the sale of club merchandise. Formerly a majority owner of the stadium, in 2010 Viktoria Žižkov's ownership stake was reduced to one third. A new playing surface was laid in 2011 after the club was promoted to the Czech First League, one of the conditions of the club's acceptance into the league. In 2020 a number of issues with the stadium came to light, including the inadequate condition of the south stand, the lack of a large scoreboard, insufficient toilet capacity, the absence of a medical room for spectators, and insufficient warm-up areas for players.

== Other teams ==
Teams other than Viktoria Žižkov have played home matches at the stadium. In the 2004–05 Czech First League, the ground hosted a home game of Chmel Blšany after they were forbidden from playing at their home stadium without floodlights. During the 2015–16 Czech National Football League, the stadium hosted home matches of Slavoj Vyšehrad, whose own stadium did not meet league criteria, while Viktoria Žižkov played in the third-tier Bohemian Football League.

Aside from association football, the stadium also hosts the Prague Lions, an American football team who currently play in the European Football Alliance.

== Transport ==
The stadium is located close to Viktoria Žižkov tram stop, which is served by tram services 5, 9, 15 and 26. The stop was known as Husinecká until being renamed in December 2021.
