= Leipzig Kings =

Professional American football team in Germany

- Current season
Logo

General information
- Founded: 2021
- Stadium: Bruno-Plache-Stadion
- Headquartered: Leipzig, Germany
- Colors: Green, yellow, white
- Website: leipzig-kings.de

Personnel
- Head coach: John Booker

League / conference affiliations
- European League of Football (ELF); Eastern Conference

The Leipzig Kings were an American football team in Leipzig, Germany, that played in the European League of Football (ELF).

== History ==
The Leipzig franchise was announced along with Berlin Thunder and Cologne Centurions in March 2021, as part of the inaugural season of the European League of Football. In April, ELF commissioner Patrick Esume praised the potential of Leipzig for growing the sport and the athletes in the university, despite the relatively short time for the Kings to prepare for the first season.

The Kings introduced their first head coach, Fred Armstrong, who previously coached the national teams of Sweden, the Czech Republic and Austria, and also gained coaching experience with Stuttgart Scorpions and two NFL teams, New York Jets and New York Giants.

On May 7, 2021, the Kings signed Japanese wide receiver Yoshihito Omi who would be the first Asian player playing in ELF. In 2019, Omi led in receiving with 33 catches and 544 yards for IBM Big Blue in X League, and acted as captain for the Japan national American football team.

The Kings were removed from the league amid the 2023 season. This came after a two week saga, which include the team suggesting they will "most likely have to stop competing in the European League of Football" after their loan requested was denied by the league and cancelling the upcoming week 6 home match with Prague Lions. The Kings would later announce their withdrawal from the league on July 11, 2023. A day later the ELF announced that the team will be taken out of the league for the remainder of the 2023 season and their license to participate in the European League of Football was "withdrawn", but would like to accept the team back for the 2024 season, if a suitable new owners will be found.

=== Season-by-season ===
Season	Head coach	Regular season					Postseason				Result	Ø Attendance
Season	Head coach	GP	Won	Lost	Win %	Finish	GP	Won	Lost	Win %	Result	Ø Attendance
2021	Fred Armstrong	10	5	5	.500	3rd (North)	DNQ					2,072
2022	Fred Armstrong	12	4	8	.333	4th (North)	DNQ					2,600
2023	John Booker	5	2	3	.400	DNF (Eastern)	Season cancelled					2,357

== Stadium ==
The Kings are playing their home games at the 7,000 capacity Bruno-Plache-Stadion.

== Roster ==
Leipzig Kings roster
Quarterbacks: Kenyatte Allen (United States); 3 Ferras El-Hendi (Germany); Running backs: Maurice Baker (Germany); Leander Carstensen (Germany); Steve McShane (United States); Niklas Ritter FB (Germany); Wide receivers: Noah Bomba (Germany); Luis Moreno (Germany); Kélian Mouliom (Germany); Leander Winter (Germany); Tight ends: Al Mustafa Khalid Almakki FB (Germany); Domenik Rofalski WR (Germany); Jens Walter (Germany)	Offensive linemen: Dominik Behrens (Germany); 74 Tilman Brütsch C (Germany); Joel Coenes (Germany); Austine Igba Ujene (Nigeria); 68 Pollys Junio Sacramento T (Brazil); Defensive linemen: Felix Delgado (Germany); Nico Koch (Germany); 97 Lance Leota DT (New Zealand); Carlo Reimann (Germany); 92 Aslan Zetterberg DT (Sweden)	Linebackers: Niels Schroedter (Germany); 49 A.J. Wentland ILB (United States); Defensive backs: Devan Burrell (United States); 4 Roedion Henrique S (Netherlands); Zil Jalaal Isaac-Turea (Germany); 24 William James CB (Sweden); René Merkel (Germany); Dominic Yaw Aboagye-Duah (Germany)	Rookies in italics Roster updated 23 March 2023; 4 A-import, 5 E-import, 22 homegrown 31 active

=== Transactions ===
From Hamburg Sea Devils: Dominik Behrens
From Stuttgart Surge: Noah Bomba
From Berlin Thunder: Kélian-Mathis Mouliom

== Staff ==
Leipzig Kings staff
Front office: Owner – Moritz Heisler, Marc Quoadt; General manager – Moritz Heisler; Director of Strategy Development – Karsten Köhler; Director of football operations – John Alexander Booker; Head coach: Head coach – John Alexander Booker; Offensive coaches: Offensive coordinator – n/a; Offensive line – n/a; Quarterbacks – Elijah Miller; Running backs – n/a; Wide receivers/tight ends – n/a	Defensive coaches: Defensive coordinator/defensive backs – David Shelton Sr.; Linebacker – n/a; Defensive line – n/a; Special teams coaches: Special teams coordinator – n/a; Strength and conditioning: Head strength and conditioning – n/a; updated 23 March 2023
