= Berlin Thunder (ELF) =

European Football Alliance Team

- Current season
Logo

General information
- Founded: March 22, 2021
- Headquartered: Berlin, Germany
- Colors: Black, white, gold

Personnel
- Owner: FBG Football Berlin GmbH
- General manager: Rasheed Moka
- Head coach: Phil McGeoghan
- President: Levon Melikian

Team history
- Berlin Thunder (2021–present)

Home fields
- Friedrich-Ludwig-Jahn-Sportpark (2021–2024); Preussen-Stadion an der Malteserstraße (2025); Friedrich-Ludwig-Jahn-Sportpark, Kleines Stadion (2026–present)

League / conference affiliations
- European League of Football (2021–2025): North Conference (2021–2022); Central Conference (2023–2024); North Division (2025); American Football League Europe (2026–present): South/East Conference (2026–present)

Playoff appearances (1)
- 2023

The Berlin Thunder are an American football team based in Berlin, Germany. The Thunder competed in the European League of Football (ELF) from 2021 to 2025, before moving to the American Football League Europe in 2026. The team plays its home games in the Kleines Stadion of Friedrich-Ludwig-Jahn-Sportpark while the main stadium is being rebuilt.

== History ==
=== European League of Football (2021–2025) ===
On 22 March 2021, the Berlin Thunder were announced as one of the eight teams to play in the inaugural season of the European League of Football. Their first game was against the Leipzig Kings on 20 June 2021, which they lost 27 to 37 at home. The rest of the 2021 season would not be successful either, with the only wins coming from games against the Stuttgart Surge, last in the league, and against the Barcelona Dragons at home, which also struggled. Nevertheless, the team faced adversity regarding practice facilities, equipment, injuries and more. Several domestic players emerged as fan favorites, like tight end Nicolai Schumann and defensive back Moritz Thiele. The NFL IPP Program also awarded Thunder defensive lineman Adedayo Odeleye an international spot with the Houston Texans. After the 2021 season the contract of head coach Jag Bal wasn't extended.

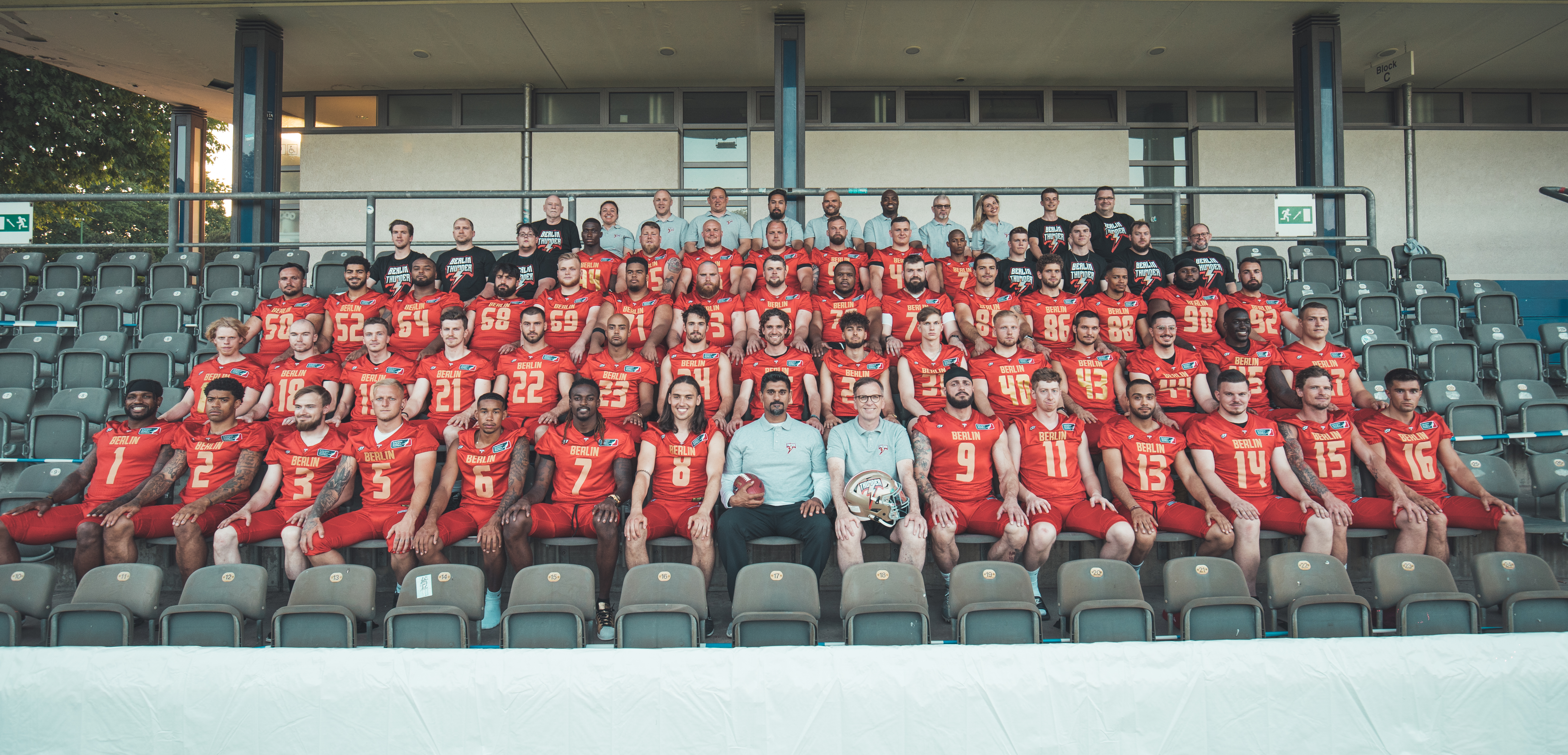
The first team and staff members of the 2021 season

On September 12, 2021, it was announced that former NFL 1st-round draft pick Björn Werner became co-owner and director of football operations of the franchise. Shortly after, then general manager Heiko von Glahn left the franchise and was succeeded by the first female general manager of the league, Diana Hoge. With the announcement of the new head coach Johnny Schmuck, all important positions in the Berlin front office have been changed. The main goal of the restructures was, to build a domestic staff and to be able to coach all year around.

The result in the 2022 season was a positive record with 7 wins and 5 losses, finishing second in the Northern Conference behind rival Hamburg Sea Devils. The offensive production increased in total passing and rushing yards, giving them a chance to reach the 4-team play-offs till the end of the regular season. With the loss against the Tirol Raiders at home, they fell short of this milestone. On the bright side, the individual performances of Kyle Kitchens with a record 16 sacks and winning the Defensive Player of the Year award, as well as Joc Crawford rushing for 1,088 total yards, stood out.

For the 2023 ELF season, only a few changes occurred with the staff. With Henry Schlegel being promoted from Head of Scouting and Analytics to offensive coordinator, he became the youngest coordinator in the league. With a new quarterback in Donovan Isom, a new WR1 in Aaron Jackson and no US-imported running back, the offense had a different scheme. As a result, the franchise reached the play-offs for the first time in their history as the 5th seed and 2nd of their conference. In the wildcard round of the 2023 ELF play-offs, the Thunder lost against the Frankfurt Galaxy on the road after a physically tough game due to the summer heat. The game was also cut short when a player collapsed and a member of the Berlin sideline got hit by a Frankfurt player.

During the 2025 season, the Thunder entered a restructuring phase by filing insolvency under self-administration.

=== American Football League Europe (2026–present) ===
After the 2025 season, a number of teams left the European League of Football, citing a lack of transparency and teams not receiving revenue shares from the league, leading to the formation of the European Football Alliance. However, the teams that formed the EFA could not agree on a league structure, with some favoring a team-led league and eventually coming to an agreement with the ELF on a new structure, while others preferred creating a new league with the support of an external investor. This new league was publicly presented on December 2, 2025, as AFLE – The League: Europe. The Berlin Thunder was announced as the third franchise for the AFLE, following the Rhein Fire and Panthers Wrocław. In the final week of the 2026 season, the AFLE announced that it activated a financial protection plan to ensure continued operation of the Thunder.

=== Season-by-season ===
Season	Head coach	Regular season					Postseason				Result	Ø Attendance
Season	Head coach	GP	Won	Lost	Win %	Finish	GP	Won	Lost	Win %	Result	Ø Attendance
2021	Jag Bal	10	3	7	.300	4th (North)	DNQ					914
2022	Johnny Schmuck	12	7	5	.583	2nd (North)	DNQ					3,583
2023	Johnny Schmuck	12	8	4	.666	2nd (Eastern)	1	0	1	.000	—	4,566
2024	Johnny Schmuck	12	5	7	.417	3rd (Eastern)	DNQ					3.456
2025	Jag Bal	12	3	9	.250	4th (East)	DNQ					644
2026	Shawn Cooper	12	5	7	.417	3rd (South/East)	DNQ					
Total	—	70	31	39	.443	—	1	0	1	.000	—	2,592

== Stadium ==
In their first season, the Thunder played the first two home games at Amateurstadion Olympiapark, and the other three at Friedrich-Ludwig-Jahn-Sportpark. From the 2022 season on, the Jahn-Sportpark-Stadium is their venue for home games. The Sportpark, with its several fields, also functions as their practise ground during the year. At the end of 2023, the stadium is going to be substantially renovated, which shouldn't disturb the day-to-day operations.

== Colors and logos ==
When the Berlin Thunder began play, they wore red, metallic gold, and black uniforms. The logo was the team's name in white and silver letters underscored by a lightning bolt, all outlined in black and red. Following the 2024 season, the Thunder would introduce a new logo and color scheme reminiscent of the original Thunder franchise. The new logo depicts Mjölnir with a lightning bolt in place of the handle, superimposed over a black shield, with the team name above. The new team colors are black, white, and gold.

First Berlin Thunder Logo (2021–2024)

== Honors ==
=== Players ===
Honor	Player Name	Season
AFLE Offensive Player of the Year	(United States) Jon Cole	2026
AFLE Most Improved OPOY	(Germany) Bais Kouanda	2026
