= Bruno-Plache-Stadion =

Multi-use stadium in Leipzig, Germany

Coordinates: 51°18′10″N 12°25′09″E

- "Bruno", "VfB-Stadion"
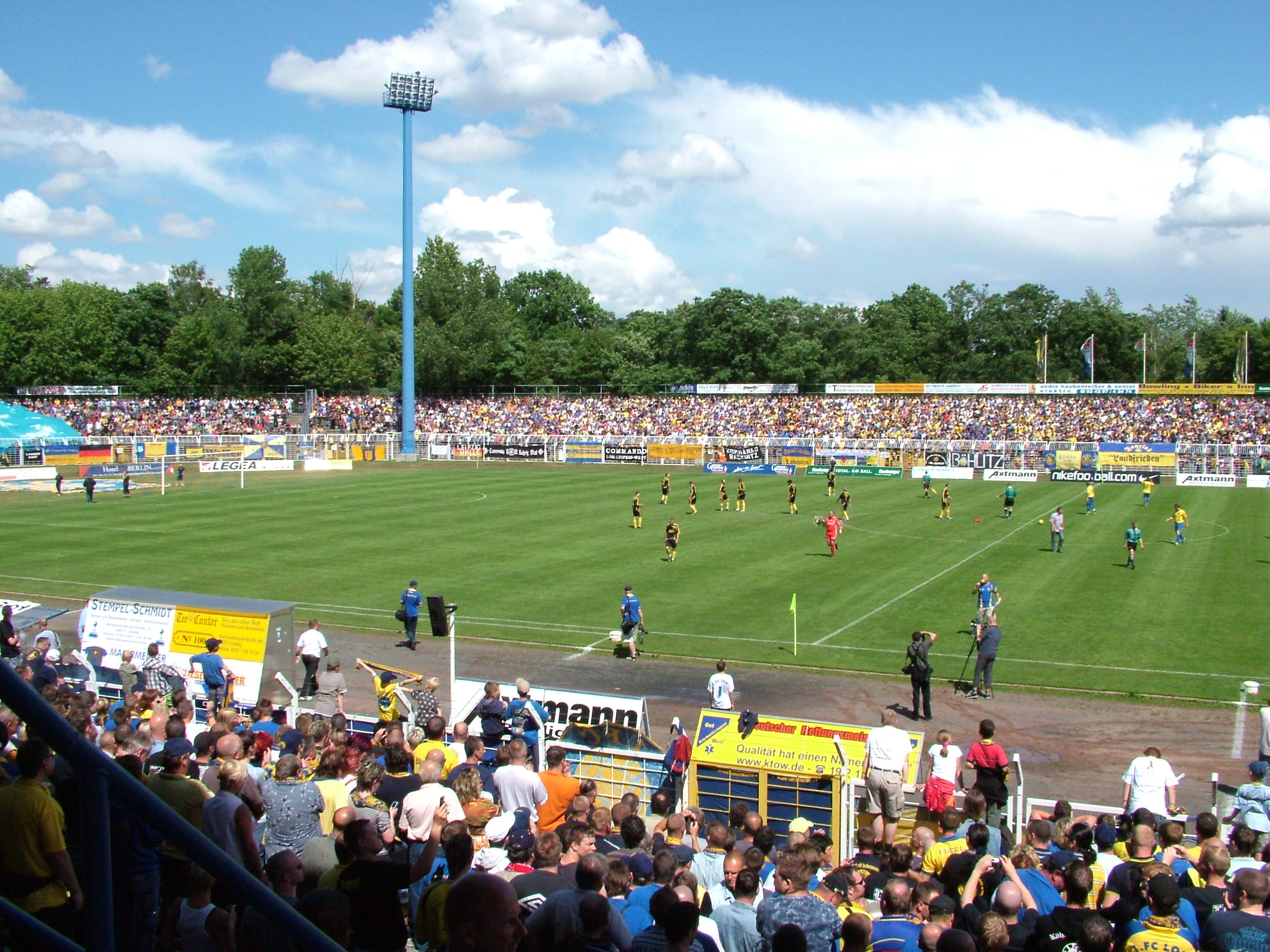
- Interactive map of Bruno-Plache-Stadion
- Former names: Probstheidaer Stadion (until 1949)
- Address: Connewitzer Straße 21, 04289 Leipzig, Germany
- Capacity: 12,300

Construction
- Groundbreaking: 1920
- Built: 1920-1922

Tenants
- 1. FC Lokomotive Leipzig (2004–present); Leipzig Kings (2022–present); VfB Leipzig (1922–1945); SG Probstheida (1945–1949); BSG Erich Zeigner Probstheida (1949–1950); BSG Einheit Leipzig-Ost (1950–1954); SC Rotation Leipzig (1954–1963); SC Leipzig (1963–1966); 1. FC Lokomotive Leipzig (1966–1990); VfB Leipzig (1990–1992, 1995–2004)

Bruno-Plache-Stadion is a multi-use stadium in Leipzig, Germany. It is currently used mostly for football matches and is the home stadium of 1. FC Lokomotive Leipzig. Fans only call it "das Bruno" (the Bruno). The stadium has a capacity of 15,600 people, but it is only accredited for 7,000 people at the moment.

It was opened in August 1922 by VfB Leipzig. When it was opened, it was the largest stadium owned by a club in Germany, with a proposed capacity of over 40,000 people. After the World War II, the stadium was home to SC Rotation Leipzig, later known as 1. FC Lokomotive Leipzig, until 1990, before the club reverted to its old name VfB Leipzig. In 1992, the German Football Association prohibited games to be held for the 2. Fußball-Bundesliga due to security requirements not being met. VfB Leipzig played their matches at the Zentralstadion until 1995. Since 2004 the stadium serves as home ground of 1. FC Lokomotive Leipzig, a club founded after VfB's bankruptcy. The city of Leipzig has full ownership of the stadium.

On June 13, 1999, Bruce Springsteen and the E Street Band played a concert at the venue as part of their Reunion Tour.

The ELF's Leipzig Kings will start to use the stadium for their home games in July 2022.
