= 2021 Cologne Centurions season =

American football team in Germany

2021 Cologne Centurions (ELF) season
- Head coach: (United States) Kirk Heidelberg
- Home stadium: Südstadion, Ostkampfbahn

Results
- Record: 5–5
- Playoffs: lost Semifinal @ Frankfurt Galaxy 6–36

Uniform
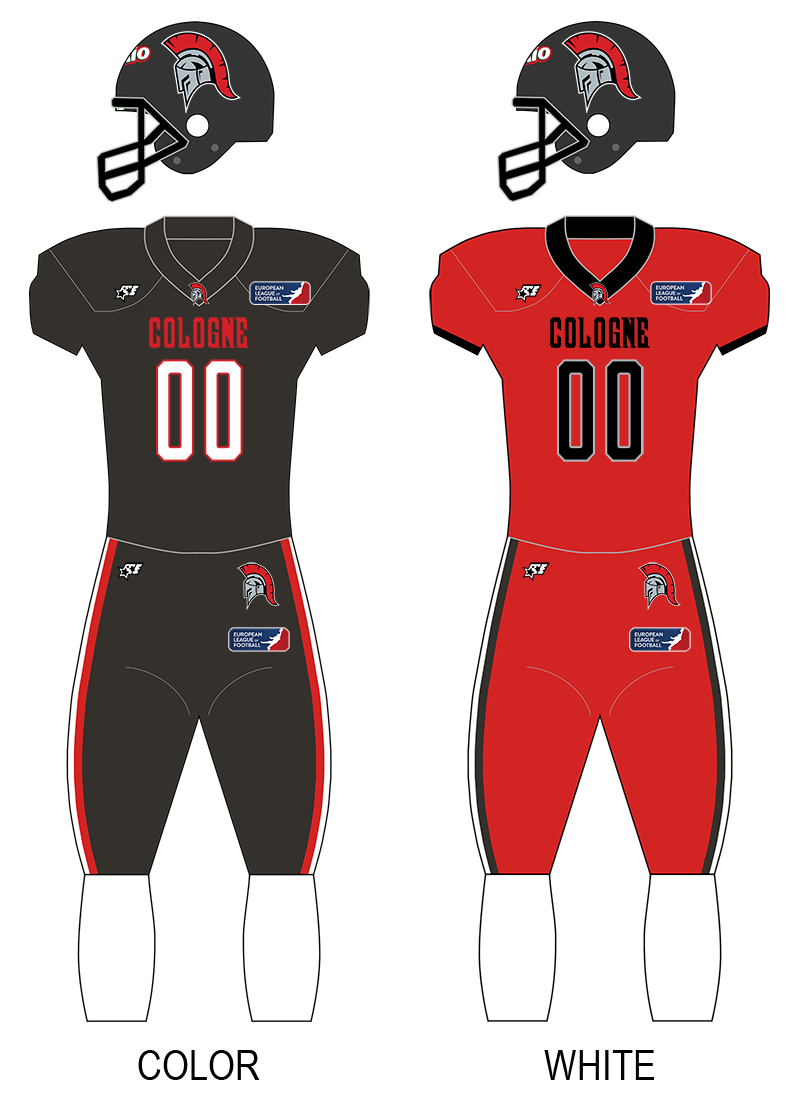

The 2021 Cologne Centurions season was the first season of the new Cologne Centurions team in the inaugural season of the European League of Football.

== Regular season ==
=== Standings ===
South Division
Pos	Team	GP	W	L	PF	PA	Div	Qualification
1	(Germany) Frankfurt Galaxy	10	9	1	357	132	6–0	Advance to playoffs
2	(Germany) Cologne Centurions	10	5	5	310	365	3–3	Advance to playoffs
3	(Spain) Barcelona Dragons	10	3	7	237	277	2–4	
4	(Germany) Stuttgart Surge	10	2	8	157	355	1–5	

Source: europeanleague.football

=== Schedule ===
Week	Date	Time (CET)	Opponent	Result	Record	Venue	TV (Note: All games can also be watched live on ELF Gamepass)	Recap
1	June 19	18:00	at Wrocław Panthers	L 39–55	0–1	Wrocław Olympic Stadium	More Than Sports TV	Recap
2	June 27	15:00	Barcelona Dragons	W 40–12	1–1	Südstadion	ProSieben Maxx, Esport3	Recap
3	July 4	15:00	at Leipzig Kings	W 48–47	2–1	Alfred-Kunze-Sportpark		Recap
4	July 11	15:00	Frankfurt Galaxy	L 20–41	2–2	Südstadion	More Than Sports TV	Recap
5	July 25	15:00	at Stuttgart Surge	W 39–23	3–2	Gazi-Stadion auf der Waldau	ProSieben Maxx	Recap
6	August 1	15:00	Wrocław Panthers	W 33–31	4–2	Südstadion		Recap
7	August 7	19:00	at Barcelona Dragons	L 51–60	4–3	Estadi Municipal	ran.de, Esport3	Recap
8	August 21	18:00	Leipzig Kings	L 24-42	4-4	Ostkampfbahn		Recap
9	August 28	15:00	Stuttgart Surge	W 19-9	5-4	Ostkampfbahn		Recap
10	September 5	15:00	at Frankfurt Galaxy	L 45-7	5-5	PSD Bank Arena		

Source: europeanleague.football

Cologne qualified for the playoffs despite losing the head-to-head against the Leipzig Kings (both teams having won their away game against the other, but Leipzig with a bigger margin) as the rules in place for the 2021 season guaranteed playoff spots to the top two teams of each division regardless of record. The city of Cologne was also the only city with both an ELF and a GFL team reaching the Playoffs in their respective 2021 seasons as the Cologne Crocodiles placed third in the GFL North, reaching the quarter-final of the 2021 German Football League. Cologne was also the only team to lose three games against the same opponent in the 2021 season, losing to Frankfurt Galaxy both at home and on the road in the regular season and again on the road in the playoffs.

== Transactions ==
On July 21, the team signed American DL Mike Taylor III, to strengthen a defense ravaged by injuries. Due to the rule regarding 4 maximum import players on a team, American QB Danny Farley was removed from the active roster, but remained with the team as an offensive assistant coach.

== Roster ==
Cologne Centurions (ELF) roster
Quarterbacks: 6 Jannik Nowak; 12 Jan Weinreich; Running backs: 4 Glody Ngovo; 9 Christopher Ezeala; 15 René Berres; 26 Andre Frisch; 28 Madre London (United States); 43 Patrick Poetsch FB; Wide receivers: 1 Quinten Pounds (United States); 10 Justin Schlesinger; 11 Noah Aarass; 13 Jannik Loercks; 14 Ramin Akhlaghi; 18 Kai Schiffer; 19 Moritz Schippe; 81 Valentin Rödiger; 85 Michael Ofosuhene (Ghana); Tight ends: 86 Leroy Stryewski; 87 Florian Eichhorn	Offensive linemen: 61 Malik Becker; 63 Jan-Niclas Delback; 68 Nick Wiens; 69 Hannes Darley; 72 Tom Maier; 73 Fabian Kratz; 76 Florian Kallwitz; 78 Fred Weinreich; Defensive linemen: 29 Matthias Banjaqui; 54 Maximilian Oebels; 55 Julian Völker; 90 Arkady Naus (Netherlands); 91 Roman Sellung; 92 Ramy Mohamed; 93 Samuel Ziebarth; 94 Benjo Cerimagic; 96 Matz Peters; 99 Junior De Souza Briele (Brazil); Mike Taylor III (United States)	Linebackers: 3 Thiadric Hansen; 5 Sydney Amadu; 44 Marius Kensy; 47 Niklas Liesen; 48 Kasper Bongaerts (Netherlands); 58 Lennart Weitz; Defensive backs: 8 Paul Steffen; 20 Jannik Seibel; 21 René Hanssen; 22 Tufan Yagmur; 23 Till Janssen; 24 Dartez Jacobs (United States); 32 Richard Grooten; 34 Dennis Laas; Special teams: 2 Daniel Schuhmacher K	Rookies in italics Roster updated 21 July 2021
