= 2021 Hamburg Sea Devils season =

American football team in Germany

2021 Hamburg Sea Devils (ELF) season
- Head coach: (Germany) Andreas Nommensen (interim)
- Home stadium: Stadion Hoheluft

Results
- Record: 7–3
- Playoffs: won Semifinal vs. Wroclaw Panthers 30–27 lost Championship Game vs Frankfurt Galaxy 30–32

Uniform
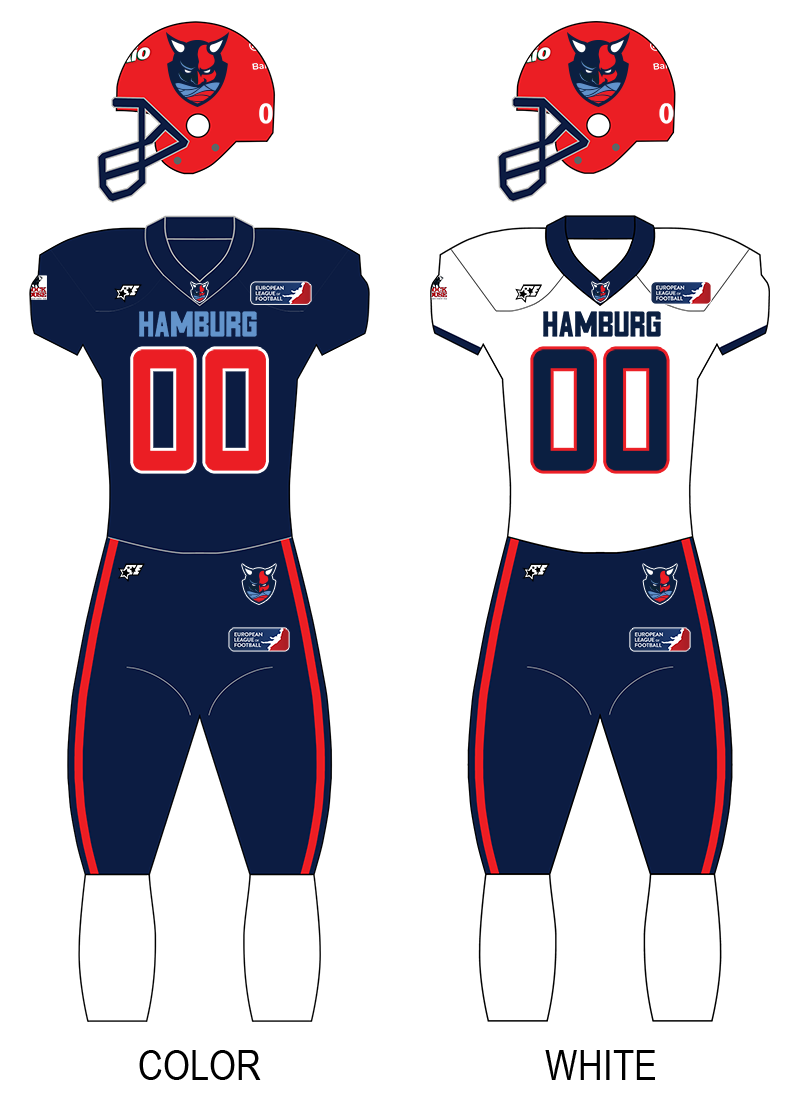

The 2021 Hamburg Sea Devils season was the first season of the new Hamburg Sea Devils team in the inaugural season of the European League of Football. After winning the first ever match of the new ELF against Frankfurt Galaxy on a last second Phillip Friis Andersen Field Goal, the team went on to post a 7–3 record, winning their North Division and beating the Wroclaw Panthers in the playoffs before going on to lose the inaugural Championship Game to the Frankfurt Galaxy by a score of 32–30.

== Regular season ==
=== Standings ===
North Division
Pos	Team	GP	W	L	PF	PA	Div	Qualification
1	(Germany) Hamburg Sea Devils	10	7	3	274	178	4–2	Advance to playoffs
2	(Poland) Wrocław Panthers	10	6	4	314	259	5–1	Advance to playoffs
3	(Germany) Leipzig Kings	10	5	5	295	320	3–3	
4	(Germany) Berlin Thunder	10	3	7	228	296	0–6	

Source: europeanleague.football

=== Schedule ===
Week	Date	Time (CET)	Opponent	Result	Record	Venue	TV (Note: All games can also be watched live on ELF Gamepass)	Recap
1	June 20	15:00	Frankfurt Galaxy	W 17–15	1–0	Stadion Hoheluft	ProSieben Maxx	Recap
2	July 3	19:00	at Barcelona Dragons	W 32–14	2–0	Estadi Municipal	ran.de, Esport3	Recap
3	July 11	18:00	Berlin Thunder	W 44–6	3–0	Stadion Hoheluft	ran.de, More Than Sports TV	Recap
4	July 18	15:00	at Leipzig Kings	W 55–0	4–0	Alfred-Kunze-Sportpark		Recap
5	July 24	15:00	at Wrocław Panthers	W 26–23	5–0	Olympic Stadium	More Than Sports TV	Recap
6	July 31	18:00	Barcelona Dragons	W 22–17	6–0	Stadion Hoheluft	ran.de, Esport3	Recap
7	August 8	15:00	at Frankfurt Galaxy	L 9–35	6–1	PSD Bank Arena	ProSieben Maxx	Recap
8	August 14	13:00	at Berlin Thunder	W 28–20	7–1	Friedrich-Ludwig-Jahn-Sportpark		Recap
9	August 22	15:00	Wrocław Panthers	L 24–30	7–2	Stadion Hoheluft		Recap
10	August 29	15:00	Leipzig Kings	L 18–17	7–3	Stadion Hoheluft		Recap

Source: europeanleague.football

== Transactions ==
On July 6, head coach Ted Daisher was released, because of "different views and expectations regarding the philosophy and leadership of our team". He was replaced on an interim basis by offensive coordinator Andreas Nommensen, who was later confirmed as head coach for the rest of the season.

On July 21, French linebacker Giovanni Nanguy was signed, after the team released 2 other linebackers, Jonas Tykfer and Paco Varol.

== Roster ==
Hamburg Sea Devils (ELF) roster
Quarterbacks: 1 Salieu Ceesay (Germany); 10 Jadrian Clark (United States); Running backs: 24 Xavier Johnson (United States); 26 Simon Homadi (Germany); 32 Jóhann Gísli Hummel (Germany); 34 Julian Ampaw (Germany); 48 Tobias Kolb FB (Germany); Wide receivers: 11 Benjamin Mau (Germany); 12 Jean-Claude Madin Cerezo (Germany); 13 Tim Albrecht (Germany); 14 Dominic Gröne (Germany); 15 Julian Völling (Germany); 16 Leon Kusterer (Germany); 18 Marvin Amankwah (Germany); 19 Nassim Amroun (Germany); 80 Diego Antonio Arboleda Sanchez (Germany); 81 Kwame Ofori (Germany); 82 Tobias Nill (Germany); 89 Lukas Rehder (Germany); Tight ends: 44 John Levi Kruse (Germany); 85 Maximilian Michael Donalies (Germany); 88 Adrià Botella Moreno (Spain)	Offensive linemen: 51 Gian De Guzman (Germany); 65 Ron Mac Spiegel (Germany); 68 Keanu Ebanks (England); 70 Oscar Sundqvist (Sweden); 72 Niklas Wiem (Germany); 74 Dennis Kenzler (Germany); 75 Friedemann Peters (Germany); 76 Timo Winter (Germany); 77 Robin Fensch (Germany); 78 Ilias Werner Maragos (Germany); Defensive linemen: 53 Filip-Liberio Filipovic (Germany); 54 Maximilian Oebels (Germany); 55 Okan Güzel (Germany); 69 David Weinstock (Netherlands); 90 André Rieckenberg (Germany); 92 Eric De Souza (Germany); 93 Alexander Babic (Germany); 94 Berend Grube (Germany); 95 Yeboah Evans (Germany); 97 Brice Ulrich Tchouadje (Cameroon); 98 Hiswill Awuah (Germany); 99 Nelson Imasuen (Canada)	Linebackers: 40 Matthias Spiegel (Germany); 43 Miguel Alessandro Boock (Germany); 45 Jeremy Sarfo (Germany); 49 Sédwon Kaya (Germany); 52 Ambroise Mati (Germany); 54 Thiago Lessow (Germany); 57 Daniel Laporte (Germany); 58 Jan-Phillip Bombek (Germany); 91 Kasim Edebali (Germany); Giovanni Nanguy (France); Defensive backs: 21 Vincent Wilson-Oberko (Germany); 22 Aleksandr Astahin (Germany); 23 Justin Rogers (United States); 25 Marloshawn Franklin Jr. (United States); 27 Louis Müller (Germany); 28 Barry Maruschke (Germany); 29 Dominic Yaw Aboagye-Duah (Germany); 30 Eldert Terekuu (Germany); 33 Kenneth Komlan Soussoukpo (Germany); Special teams: 4 Phillip Friis Andersen K/P (Denmark)	Rookies in italics Roster updated 21 July 2021
