= 2021 Stuttgart Surge season =

American football club in Germany season

- Head coach: (Germany) Martin Hanselmann
- Home stadium: Gazi-Stadion auf der Waldau

Results
- Record: 2–8

Uniform
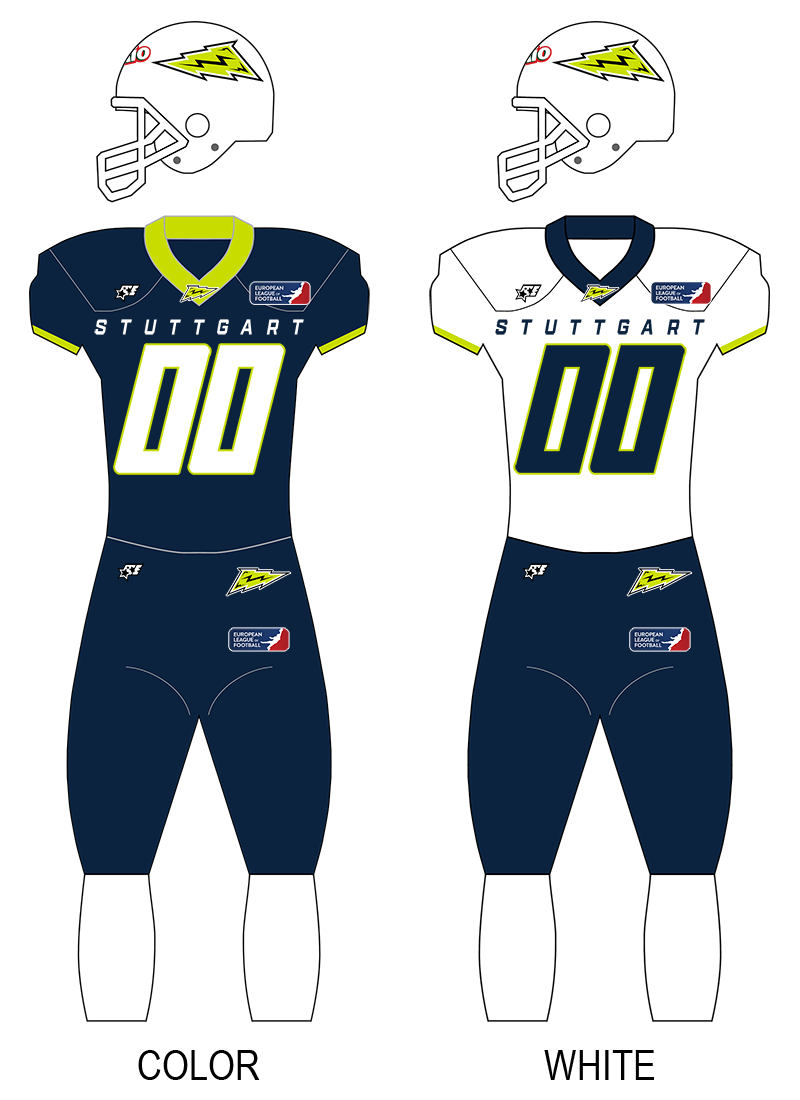

The 2021 Stuttgart Surge season was the first season of Stuttgart Surge in the inaugural season of the European League of Football.

== Regular season ==
=== Standings ===
South Division
Pos	Team	GP	W	L	PF	PA	Div	Qualification
1	(Germany) Frankfurt Galaxy	10	9	1	357	132	6–0	Advance to playoffs
2	(Germany) Cologne Centurions	10	5	5	310	365	3–3	Advance to playoffs
3	(Spain) Barcelona Dragons	10	3	7	237	277	2–4	
4	(Germany) Stuttgart Surge	10	2	8	157	355	1–5	

Source: europeanleague.football

With only two wins in ten games, the Surge finished with the worst record in the league. After their week 4 win against Berlin, they entered a six game losing streak, the longest of any team in the inaugural ELF season.

=== Schedule ===
Week	Date	Time (CET)	Opponent	Result	Record	Venue	TV (Note: All games can also be watched live on ELF Gamepass)	Recap
1	June 19	19:00	at Barcelona Dragons	W 21–17	1–0	Estadi Municipal	ran.de, Esport3	Recap
2	June 27	15:00	Frankfurt Galaxy	L 20–42	1–1	Gazi-Stadion auf der Waldau	More Than Sports TV	Recap
3	July 4	15:00	at Berlin Thunder	L 19–40	1–2	Amateurstadion Olympiapark		Recap
4	July 11	15:00	Leipzig Kings	W 27–24	2–2	Gazi-Stadion auf der Waldau	ProSieben Maxx	Recap
5	July 25	15:00	Cologne Centurions	L 23–39	2–3	Gazi-Stadion auf der Waldau	ProSieben Maxx	Recap
6	August 1	15:00	at Frankfurt Galaxy	L 3–57	2–4	PSD Bank Arena		Recap
7	August 8	15:00	at Leipzig Kings	L 23–49	2–5	Alfred-Kunze-Sportpark		
8	August 15	15:00	Barcelona Dragons	L 12–30	2–6	Gazi-Stadion auf der Waldau	Esport3	Recap
9	August 28	15:00	at Cologne Centurions	L 9–19	2–7	Ostkampfbahn		Recap
10	September 5	15:00	Berlin Thunder	L 0–38	2–8	Gazi-Stadion auf der Waldau		Recap

Source: europeanleague.football

== Transactions ==
On June 29, starting QB Jacob Wright was released, following allegations that the player used a racial slur in the previous game. A few days later, Stuttgart signed American QB Aaron Ellis, most recently from Danish team Sollerod Gold Diggers.

== Roster ==
Stuttgart Surge roster
Quarterbacks: 2 Aaron Ellis (United States); 16 Michael Winterlik; Running backs: 7 Tom Edel; 22 Collins Kamara; 26 Ruben Pein; 41 Bryan Yankson; 34 Serdar Kiraz; 27 Samuel Shannon; 39 Dimitri Gfeller; Wide receivers: 4 Alexander Eitel; 12 Frederic Latour; 14 Louis Geyer; 17 Pascal Flöser; 18 Paul Steigerwald; 81 Fabian Weigel; 24 Finn Seibert; 85 Peter Weiblen; 87 Domenik Rofalski; Tight ends: 5 David Meza (United States); 88 Marvin Pludra	Offensive linemen: 56 Jens Walther; 73 Leon Häbich; 66 Marvin Röber; 68 Jason Kühn; 70 Maximilian Kempchen; 71 Jan Steiger; 75 Jai Jackson (England); 77 Marc Kuppinger; 51 Thomas Ghebrezherer; 78 Nicko Schuster; Defensive linemen: 72 Darko Pisaric (Croatia); 91 Paul Ziebart; 92 Tobias Burkhardt; 95 Felix Haufe; 96 Florian Breitenbach; 97 Philipp Ungericht; 98 Marcel Fürst; 99 Sercan Vardar	Linebackers: 20 Dale Warren (United States); 2 Danny Washington; 44 Japhet Mbala; 45 Nijaz Hamulic; 48 Tom Stickel; 51 Anthony Morris; 55 Dennis Gratza; 58 Lasse Rave; 54 Constantin Lässing; Zachary Blair (United States); Defensive backs: 21 Julian Jakob CB; 23 Marcel Dabo CB/S; 31 Nick Wenzelburger S; 32 Julian Ludwig-Mayorga S; 33 Luca Siebert CB/S; 33 Ben Wenzler CB; 37 Kevin Bannasch S; 30 Till Becker CB; 8 Victor Ferrier S; Special teams: 10 Jens Hauser K; 3 Timo Bronn K; Stefan Müller K	Rookies in italics Roster updated 12 July 2021
