= 2021 Barcelona Dragons season =

American football team in Spain

2021 Barcelona Dragons (ELF) season
- Head coach: (United States) Adam Rita
- Home stadium: Estadi Municipal

Results
- Record: 3–7

Uniform
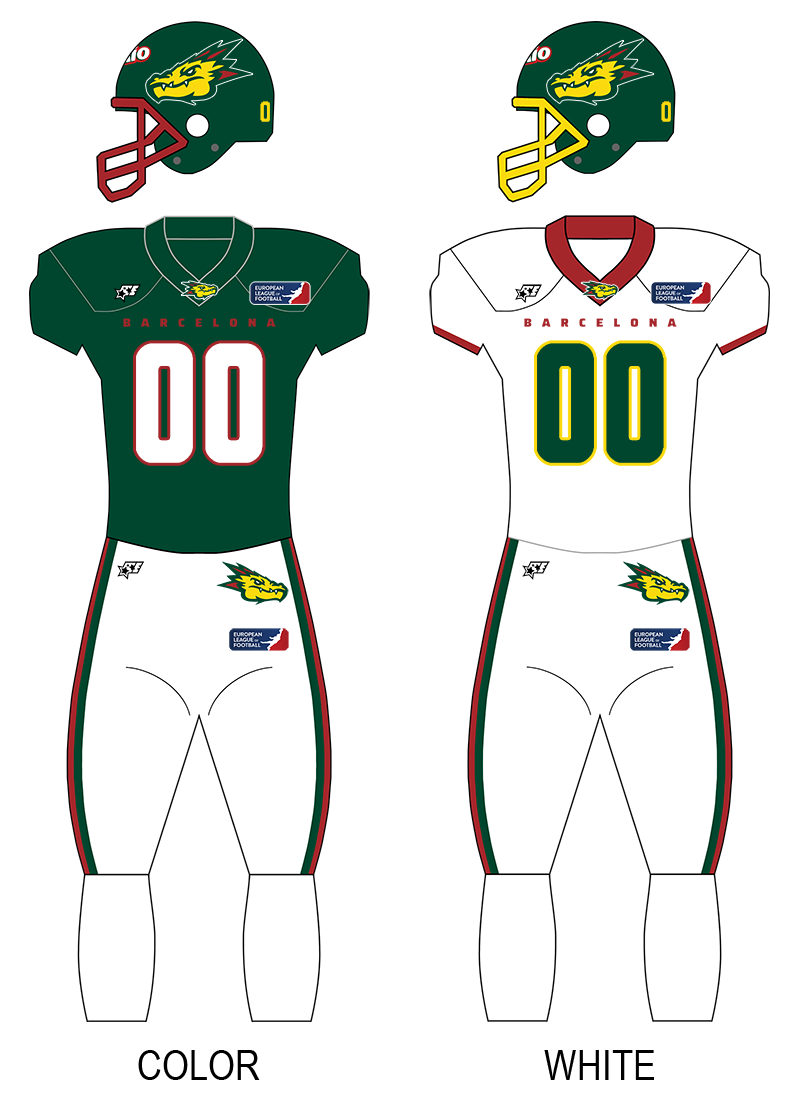

The 2021 Barcelona Dragons season was the first season of the new Barcelona Dragons team in the inaugural season of the European League of Football. Initially called Gladiators Football, the Barcelona franchise was renamed after the league announced it had reached an agreement with the NFL, to be able to use the team names from the days of NFL Europe.

== Regular season ==
=== Standings ===
South Division
Pos	Team	GP	W	L	PF	PA	Div	Qualification
1	(Germany) Frankfurt Galaxy	10	9	1	357	132	6–0	Advance to playoffs
2	(Germany) Cologne Centurions	10	5	5	310	365	3–3	Advance to playoffs
3	(Spain) Barcelona Dragons	10	3	7	237	277	2–4	
4	(Germany) Stuttgart Surge	10	2	8	157	355	1–5	

Source: europeanleague.football

=== Schedule ===
Week	Date	Time (CET)	Opponent	Result	Record	Venue	TV (Note: All games can also be watched live on ELF Gamepass)	Recap
1	June 19	19:00	Stuttgart Surge	L 17–21	0–1	Estadi Municipal	Esport3, ran.de	Recap
2	June 27	15:00	at Cologne Centurions	L 12–40	0–2	Südstadion	Esport3, ProSieben Maxx	Recap
3	July 3	19:00	Hamburg Sea Devils	L 14–32	0–3	Estadi Municipal	Esport3, ran.de	Recap
4	July 17	18:00	at Frankfurt Galaxy	L 22–42	0–4	PSD Bank Arena	Esport3, ran.de	Recap
5	July 24	19:00	Berlin Thunder	W 48–16	1–4	Estadi Municipal	Esport3, ran.de	Recap
6	July 31	18:00	at Hamburg Sea Devils	L 17–22	1–5	Stadion Hoheluft	Esport3, ran.de	Recap
7	August 7	19:00	Cologne Centurions	W 60–51	2–5	Estadi Municipal	Esport3, ran.de	Recap
8	August 15	15:00	at Stuttgart Surge	W 30–12	3–5	Gazi-Stadion auf der Waldau	Esport3	Recap
9	August 22	15:00	at Berlin Thunder	L 3–19	3–6	Friedrich-Ludwig-Jahn-Sportpark	Esport3, More Than Sports TV	Recap
10	August 28	19:00	Frankfurt Galaxy	L 14–22	3–7	Estadi Municipal	Esport3, ran.de	Recap

Source: europeanleague.football

== Attendance ==
Rank	Team	GP	Total	High	Low	Average
7	Barcelona Dragons	5	5,815	1,386	775	1,163
–	Total	38	68,504	4,500	333	1,803

== Roster ==
Barcelona Dragons (ELF) roster
Quarterbacks: 1 Zach Edwards (United States); 14 Sergio Barbero; Running backs: 3 Adrián Jiménez; 17 Alejandro Herrero; 21 Antoni Montón; 24 Javier Castañón; 34 Elias Rodriguez; Wide receivers: 4 Rémi Bertellin (France); 5 Jean Constant (United States); 13 Samuel Anca; 15 Mario Flores; 80 Jordi Torrededia; 82 Juan Hervás; 85 Jaume Llinas; 86 Martin Emos (Belgium); 88 Roque Alarcon; 83 Javier Barrena	Offensive linemen: 57 Elvys Núñez; 58 Raúl Hernández; 60 Naren Ishwani; 65 Jan Raus (Czech Republic); 68 Nicholas Møller-Hansen (Denmark); 70 Jedrzej Rudnicki (Poland); 75 Álvaro López; 78 Axel Irigoite (Argentina); 79 Irvin Santana; 70 Pierce Boothby (Wales); 60 Celestin Ngimbi; 62 Carlos Carrasco-Sanz; Defensive linemen: 2 Giacomo Prati (Italy); 7 Myke Tavarres (United States); 46 Vicente Latorre; 73 Sebastian Bowen; 90 Alejandro Fernández; 91 Carlos Guillén; 93 Arthur Pinheiro (Portugal); 99 Yago Rivero; 98 Kevin Ribeiro (France)	Linebackers: 10 Cesare Brugnani; 33 Timon Debiez (France); 41 Daniel Monfared; 42 Guillermo Bahillo; 45 Álex "Posito" González; 49 Sebastián Castañer; 53 Josep Tricas; 55 Iván Gutiérrez; 59 Víctor Albarracín; Defensive backs: 11 Brandon Brooks (United States); 20 Lucas Masero; 22 Lautaro Frecha (Argentina); 23 Jordi Brugnani; 25 Niko Lester (Germany); 27 Andy Vera; 32 Jonathan Corradini (Germany) (Italy); 6 Javier Carrasco-Sanz; Special teams: 18 Chris Manser K/P (Australia); 8 Giorgio Tavecchio K (Italy); 12 Luis Cereceda K/P	Rookies in italics Roster updated 5 November 2023

== Awards ==
=== ELF All Stars Invitees ===
Player	Position	Award
Remi Bartellin (France)	WR	Invited
Andy Vera (Spain)	DB	Invited
Niko Lester (Germany)	DB	Invited
Nicholas Møller-Hansen (Denmark)	OL	Reserve

=== ELF Honors 2021. Nominees ===
Player	Position	Award
Patrick Wennin (United States)	OC	Offensive Coordinator of the year
Jean Constant (United States)	WR	Offensive Player of the year
Myke Tavarres (United States)	DE	Defensive Player of the year

=== MVP of the Week ===
Week	Player	Position	Team	Stat
6	Jean Constant (United States)	WR	Barcelona Dragons	10 Rec, 164 Yds, 3 TD
8	Zach Edwards (United States)	QB	Barcelona Dragons	4 TD, 0 Int, 454 Yds passing, 2 Rush TD

== Staff ==
- Head Coach - Adam Rita
- Offensive Coordinator - Patrick Wennin
- Defensive Coordinator - Doug Semones
- Special Teams Coordinator - PJ Gremaud

- OL Coach - Ron Smeltzer
- WR Coach - Devin Bullock
- RB Coach - Patrick Wennin

- DL Coach - Marcell Frazier
- LB Coach - Raul Saavedra
