= 2021 Frankfurt Galaxy season =

- Head coach: (Germany) Thomas Kösling
- Home stadium: PSD Bank Arena

Results
- Record: 9–1
- Playoffs: won Semifinal vs. Cologne Centurions 36–6 won Championship Game vs. Hamburg Sea Devils 32–30

Uniform
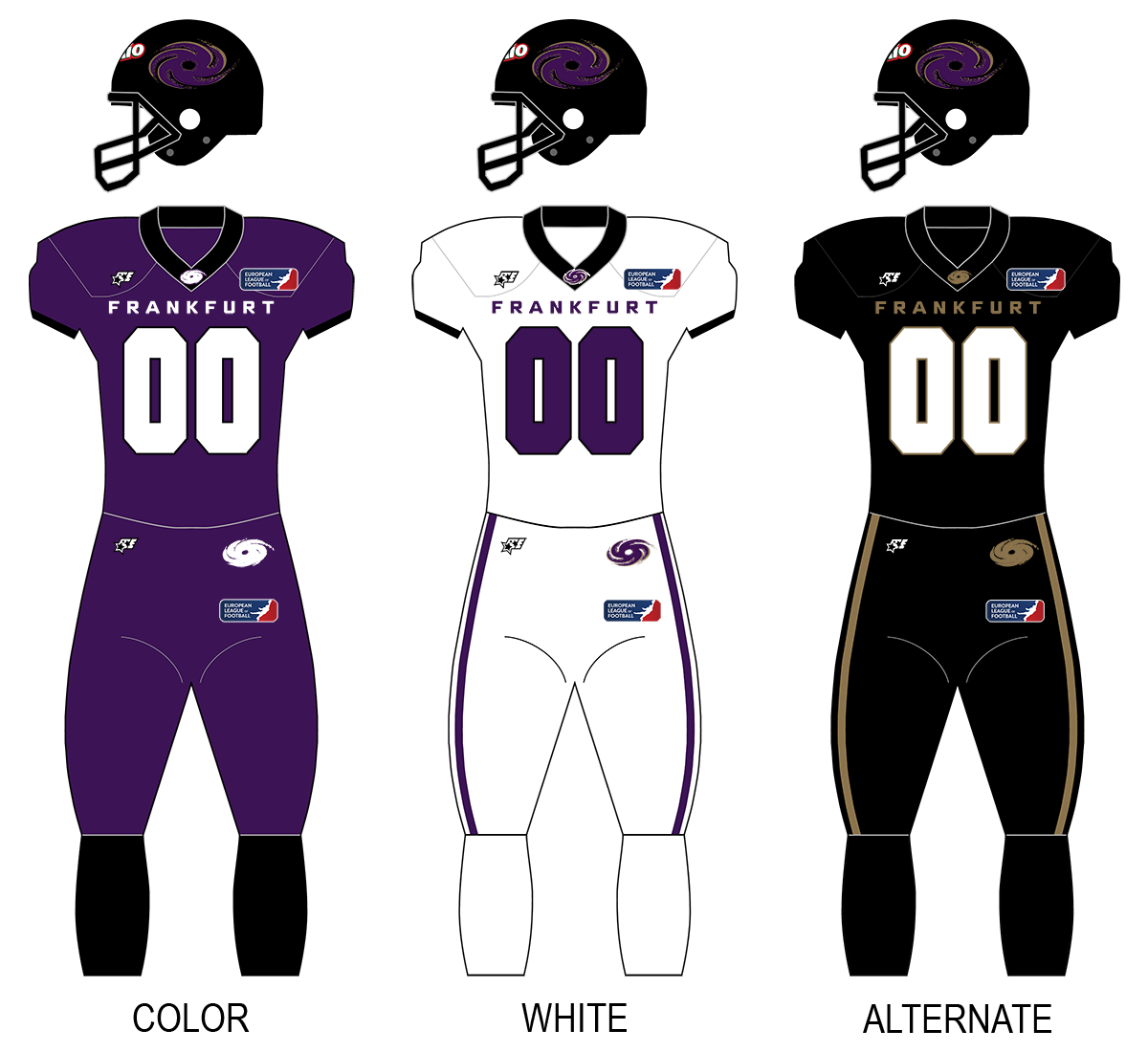

The 2021 Frankfurt Galaxy season was the first season of the new Frankfurt Galaxy team in the inaugural season of the European League of Football. After losing the season opener to the Hamburg Sea Devils on a last second Phillip Friis Andersen Field Goal, the team proceeded to win all remaining games, to win their ELF South Division, beating the Cologne Centurions in the playoffs and ultimately winning the inaugural Championship Game at Merkur Spiel-Arena, Düsseldorf against the Hamburg Sea Devils on September 26, 2021.

== Regular season ==
=== Standings ===
South Division
Pos	Team	GP	W	L	PF	PA	Div	Qualification
1	(Germany) Frankfurt Galaxy	10	9	1	357	132	6–0	Advance to playoffs
2	(Germany) Cologne Centurions	10	5	5	310	365	3–3	Advance to playoffs
3	(Spain) Barcelona Dragons	10	3	7	237	277	2–4	
4	(Germany) Stuttgart Surge	10	2	8	157	355	1–5	

Source: europeanleague.football

=== Schedule ===
Week	Date	Time (CET)	Opponent	Result	Record	Venue	TV (Note: All games can also be watched live on ELF Gamepass)	Recap
1	June 20	15:00	at Hamburg Sea Devils	L 15–17	0–1	Stadion Hoheluft	ProSieben Maxx	Recap
2	June 27	15:00	at Stuttgart Surge	W 42–20	1–1	Gazi-Stadion auf der Waldau	More Than Sports TV	Recap
3	July 4	15:00	Wrocław Panthers	W 22–13	2–1	PSD Bank Arena	ProSieben Maxx	Recap
4	July 11	15:00	at Cologne Centurions	W 41–20	3–1	Südstadion	More Than Sports TV	Recap
5	July 17	18:00	Barcelona Dragons	W 42–22	4–1	PSD Bank Arena	ran.de, Esport3	Recap
6	August 1	15:00	Stuttgart Surge	W 57–3	5–1	PSD Bank Arena	ran.de	Recap
7	August 8	15:00	Hamburg Sea Devils	W 35–9	6–1	PSD Bank Arena	ProSieben Maxx	Recap
8	August 15	15:00	at Wrocław Panthers	W 36–7	7–1	Olympic Stadium	ProSieben Maxx	Recap
9	August 28	19:00	at Barcelona Dragons	W 22–14	8–1	Estadi Municipal	ran.de, Esport3	Recap
10	September 5	15:00	Cologne Centurions	W 45–7	9–1	PSD Bank Arena	ran.de	Recap

Source: europeanleague.football

== Playoffs ==
Division Finals
N1	(Germany) Hamburg Sea Devils	30
N2	(Poland) Wrocław Panthers	27
S1	(Germany) Frankfurt Galaxy	36
S2	(Germany) Cologne Centurions	6

Championship Game
(Germany) Hamburg Sea Devils	30
(Germany) Frankfurt Galaxy	32

=== Divisional playoffs ===
==== South: Frankfurt Galaxy 36, Cologne Centurions 3 ====
Cologne Centurions vs. Frankfurt Galaxy

Quarter	1	2	3	4	Total
Centurions	0	0	0	3	3
Galaxy	14	13	6	3	36

at PSD Bank Arena, Frankfurt, Germany

- Date: 11 September 2021
- Game time: 14:45 CET
- Game attendance: 2,000
- Referee: K. Walentynow
- Game Book

==== North: Hamburg Sea Devils 30, Wrocław Panthers 27 ====
Wrocław Panthers vs. Hamburg Sea Devils

Quarter	1	2	3	4	Total
Panthers	7	7	0	13	27
Sea Devils	14	0	3	13	30

at Stadion Hoheluft, Hamburg, Germany

- Date: 12 September 2021
- Game time: 14:45 CET
- Game attendance: 2,200
- Referee: Thomas Denker
- Game Book

== Championship Game ==
The inaugural Championship Game, between the North and South division champions, was played on September 26, at Merkur Spiel-Arena in Düsseldorf. In a game in which the lead changed more than once, the impact of the kicking game could be felt, as Frankfurt, not confident enough of the quality of their placekicker, opted for two point conversions after every single Touchdown (only one out of five being successful) and not attempting a single Field Goal. Meanwhile Phillip Friis Andersen who had made 17 out of 18 attempts during the regular season (league best) and made every single Point after Touchdown attempt during the game missed a field goal attempt from 38 yards while the score was 30-26 in favor of Hamburg and another from 61 yards on the last play of the game for Hamburg.

Year	North Division		South Division		Site	Attendance	MVP
2021	Hamburg Sea Devils	30	Frankfurt Galaxy	32	Merkur Spiel-Arena • (Germany) Düsseldorf	22,000	Jakeb Sullivan

Hamburg Sea Devils vs. Frankfurt Galaxy

Quarter	1	2	3	4	Total
Sea Devils	7	10	10	3	30
Galaxy	0	20	0	12	32

at Merkur Spiel-Arena, Düsseldorf, Germany

- Date: 26 September 2021
- Game time: 14:45 CET
- Game attendance: 22,000
- Referee: M. Scholz
- Game Book

== Roster ==
Frankfurt Galaxy roster
Quarterbacks: 4 Lukas von Stumpfeldt (Germany); 6 Moritz Johannknecht (Germany); 7 Jakeb Sullivan (United States); Running backs: 21 Gennadiy Adams (Russia); 22 Gerald Ameln (Germany); 27 Florian Schneikert (Germany); 33 Justin Rodney (Germany); 45 Max Schmidt (Germany); Wide receivers: 11 Anthony Mahoungou (France); 13 Marvin Rutsch (Germany); 15 Max Siemssen (Germany); 17 Nico Schön (Germany); 19 Nico Strahmann (Germany); 42 Max Ebsen (Germany); 81 Noah Bomba (Germany); 82 Hendrik Schwarz (Germany); 83 Luca Sack (Germany); 84 Cheikhou Sow (France); 85 Markus Hachenberg (Germany); 86 Lorenz Regler (Germany); Tight ends: 87 Kevin Mwamba (France)	Offensive linemen: 52 Darnell Minton (Germany); 58 Pascal Abt (Germany); 61 Lars Hampel (Germany); 62 Lucas Hebel (Germany); 70 Moritz Schmidt (Germany); 71 Frank Atunlese (Germany); 72 Marko Vidovic (Croatia); 73 Jan-Hendrik Hoffmeyer (Germany); 74 Sven Fischer (Germany); 75 Joachim Christensen (Denmark); 76 Nils Hampel (Germany); 77 Yannic Kiehl (Germany); Defensive linemen: 55 Ville Valasti (Finland); 63 Nicolas Werle (Germany); 68 Joachim Bachmann (Germany); 90 Marc Anthony Hor (Germany); 92 Milan Mišić (Germany); 94 Cedric Udegbe (Germany); 95 Mete Konya (Germany); 96 Mamadou Sy (France); 98 Maximilian Loetz (Germany); 99 Kevin Maier (Germany)	Linebackers: 41 Sebastian Gauthier (Sweden); 43 Jhonattan Silva Gomez (Germany); 44 Mark Gorelik (Germany); 46 Precious Ogbevoen (Austria); 47 Joshua Sauren (Germany); 49 Long Hoang (Germany); 53 Daniel Josiah (Portugal); 56 Sebastian Silva Gomez (Germany); 57 Maximilian Krauss (Germany); 59 Rudolf Warkentin (Germany); Defensive backs: 10 Omari Williams (United States); 14 Joshua Poznanski (Germany); 18 Fernando Lowery (United States); 20 Steffen Olschok (Germany); 24 Robin Maier (Germany); 25 Benjamin Barnes (Germany); 26 Peter Devoe (Germany); 28 Simon Otto (Germany); 29 Marius Riepe (Germany); 30 Falk Reuter (Germany); 36 Myron De Vane (Germany)	Reserve lists: 23 Desmond Cooper DB (United States); 40 Kadel King LB (United Kingdom); 97 Wayne Drew DL (United Kingdom); Rookies in italics Roster updated 10 Sept 2021
