= 2021 Berlin Thunder season =

2021 Berlin Thunder (ELF) season
- General manager: Heiko Von Glahn
- Head coach: (Canada) Jag Bal
- Home stadium: Amateurstadion Olympiapark; Friedrich-Ludwig-Jahn-Sportpark

Results
- Record: 3–7

Uniform
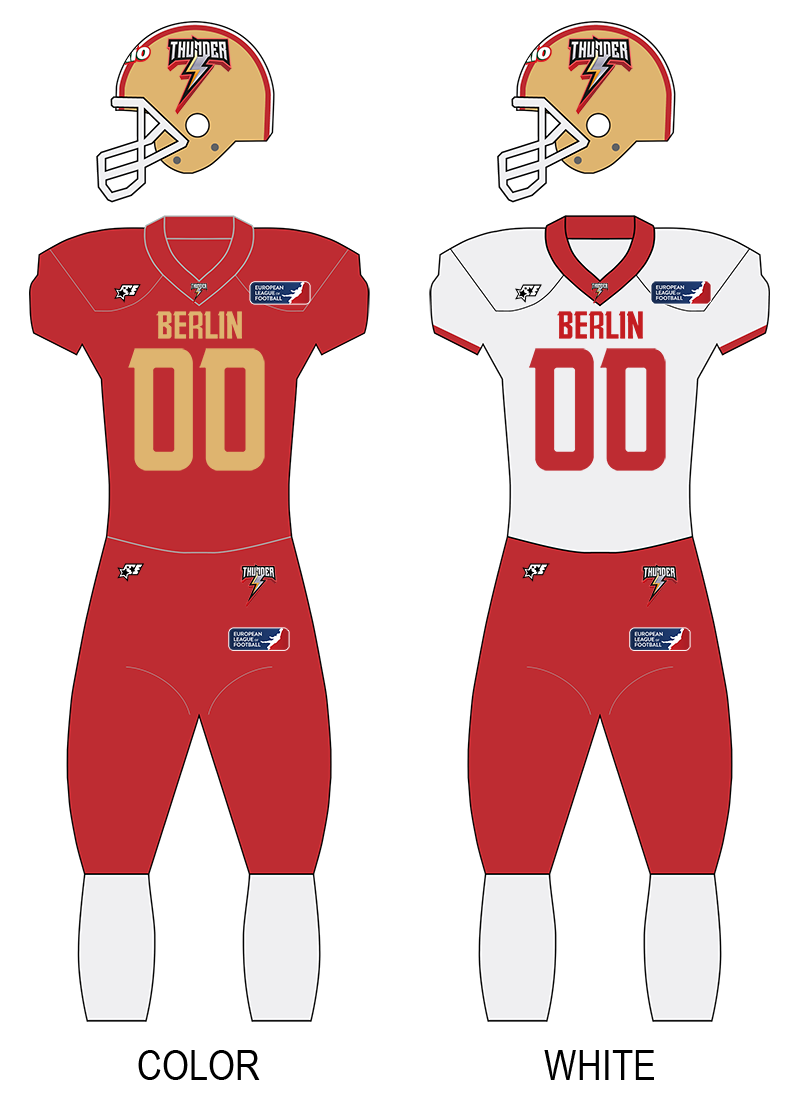

The 2021 Berlin Thunder season was the first season of the new Berlin Thunder team in the inaugural season of the European League of Football.

== Regular season ==
=== Standings ===
North Division
Pos	Team	GP	W	L	PF	PA	Div	Qualification
1	(Germany) Hamburg Sea Devils	10	7	3	274	178	4–2	Advance to playoffs
2	(Poland) Wrocław Panthers	10	6	4	314	259	5–1	Advance to playoffs
3	(Germany) Leipzig Kings	10	5	5	295	320	3–3	
4	(Germany) Berlin Thunder	10	3	7	228	296	0–6	

Source: europeanleague.football

=== Schedule ===
Week	Date	Time (CEST)	Opponent	Result	Record	Venue	TV (Note: All games can also be watched live on ELF Gamepass)	Recap
1	June 20	15:00	Leipzig Kings	L 27–37	0–1	Amateurstadion Olympiapark	More Than Sports TV	Recap
2	July 4	15:00	Stuttgart Surge	W 40–19	1–1	Amateurstadion Olympiapark		Recap
3	July 11	18:00	at Hamburg Sea Devils	L 6–44	1–2	Stadion Hoheluft	ran.de, More Than Sports TV	Recap
4	July 18	15:00	Wrocław Panthers	L 26–45	1–3	Friedrich-Ludwig-Jahn-Sportpark	ProSieben Maxx	Recap
5	July 24	19:00	at Barcelona Dragons	L 16–48	1–4	Estadi Municipal	ran.de, Esport3	Recap
6	August 1	15:00	at Leipzig Kings	L 24–37	1–5	Alfred-Kunze-Sportpark	ProSieben Maxx	
7	August 14	13:00	Hamburg Sea Devils	L 20–28	1–6	Friedrich-Ludwig-Jahn-Sportpark		
8	August 22	13:00	Barcelona Dragons	W 19–3	2–6	Friedrich-Ludwig-Jahn-Sportpark	Esport3	
9	August 29	13:00	at Wrocław Panthers	L 12–35	2–7	Wrocław Olympic Stadium		
10	September 5	15:00	at Stuttgart Surge	W 38–0	3–7	Gazi-Stadion auf der Waldau		

Source: europeanleague.football

== Roster ==
Berlin Thunder (ELF) roster
Quarterbacks: 6 Calvin Stitt (England); 13 Ashley Bailey (England); Running backs: 1 Joc Crawford (United States); 9 Pascal Schaar; 40 Jeremy Sommerwerk; 47 Yannic Landfried; Wide receivers: 5 Andre Dickmeis; 7 Seantavius Jones (United States); 11 Bryan Zerbe; 17 Emil Drossard; 21 Daniel Weiswange; 80 Tino Ndongo (Finland); 85 Nicolai Schumann; Tight ends: Yannis Binner	Offensive linemen: 50 Hamsa El-Zein; 55 Deon Mutsvanemoto (England); 57 Matan Lockitch; 69 Jannik Werblow; 71 Gideon Grabert; 73 Marcel Camenz; 76 Florian Gerlach; 77 Otávio Amorim (Brazil); 78 Lane Acheompong; 79 Conrad Schmid; Defensive linemen: 4 Aaron Boadu; 45 Kolin Hill (United States); 48 Falco Paris; 68 Pollys Junio Sacramento (Brazil); 90 Cedric Ouattara; 93 Gabriel Wiek; 95 Nick Rudloff; 96 Marcel Behm; 99 Pascal Labus; Max Baehr; Adedayo Odeleye (Nigeria)	Linebackers: 2 Benedikt Assis; 22 Louis Achaintre (France); 44 Marcel Steffen; Wael Nasri (France); Defensive backs: 2 Jamaal White (United States); 3 Arne Gehrt; 8 Paul Seifert; 10 Simon Mayerhoff; 14 Luis Muller Atzerodt; 15 Moritz Thiele; 16 Louis Rieger; 18 Leo Leeser; 19 Phillip Ruffin; 21 Najim Hennig CB; 23 Jason Eid CB; 24 Maxime De Falcis (France); 28 Alexander Karim Rushdy Stadahl CB; 31 Iiro Pekkarinen CB (Finland); 32 Dominique Pfeffer; 42 Paul Fischer CB; Special teams: 14 Kevin Hummel P; 26 Jonas Schenderlein K	Rookies in italics Roster updated 18 June 2021
