= 2021 Wrocław Panthers season =

American football team in Poland

2021 Panthers Wrocław season
- Head coach: (Poland) Jakub Samel
- Home stadium: Olympic Stadium

Results
- Record: 6–4
- Playoffs: lost Semifinal @ Hamburg Sea Devils 27–30

Uniform
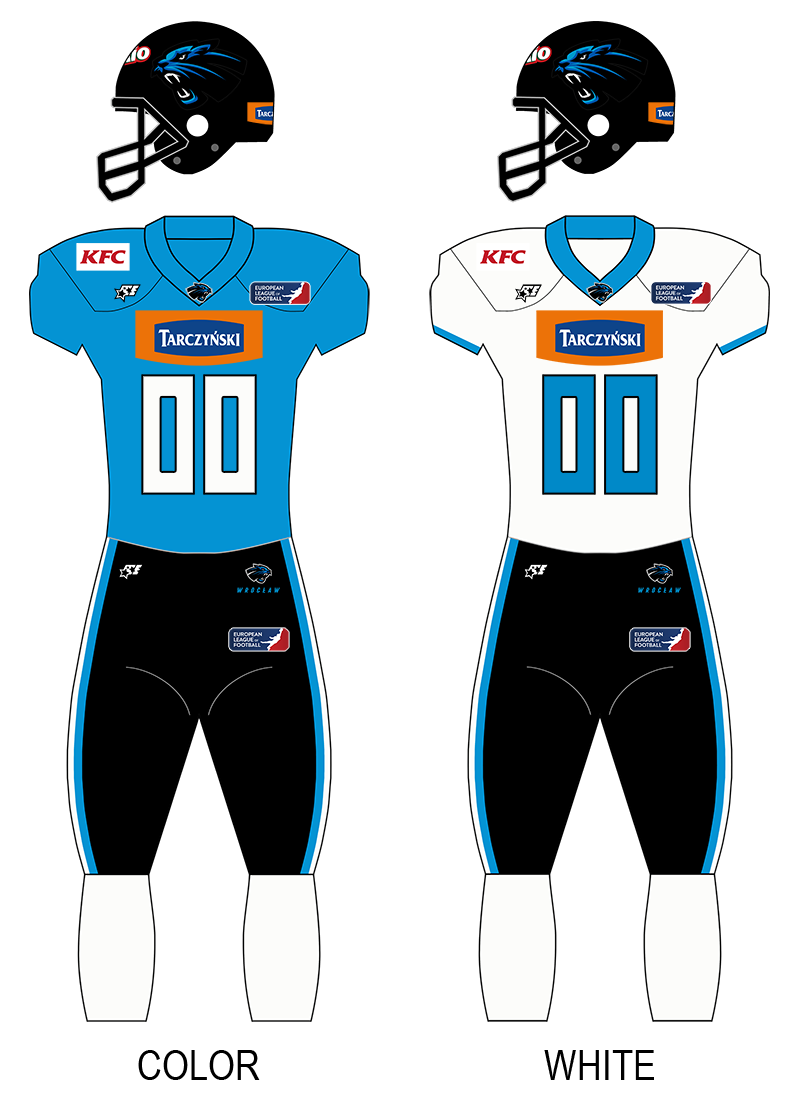

The 2021 Wrocław Panthers season was the first season of the Wrocław Panthers team in the European League of Football, after moving over from the Polish league LFA.

== Regular season ==
=== Standings ===
North Division
| Pos | Team | GP | W | L | PF | PA | Div | Qualification |
|---|---|---|---|---|---|---|---|---|
| 1 | (Germany) Hamburg Sea Devils | 10 | 7 | 3 | 274 | 178 | 4–2 | Advance to playoffs |
| 2 | (Poland) Wrocław Panthers | 10 | 6 | 4 | 314 | 259 | 5–1 | Advance to playoffs |
| 3 | (Germany) Leipzig Kings | 10 | 5 | 5 | 295 | 320 | 3–3 | |
| 4 | (Germany) Berlin Thunder | 10 | 3 | 7 | 228 | 296 | 0–6 | |

Source: europeanleague.football

=== Schedule ===
| Week | Date | Time (CET) | Opponent | Result | Record | Venue | TV (Note: All games can also be watched live on ELF Gamepass) | Recap |
| 1 | June 19 | 18:00 | Cologne Centurions | W 55–39 | 1–0 | Olympic Stadium | More Than Sports TV | Recap |
| 2 | June 26 | 18:00 | Leipzig Kings | W 54–28 | 2–0 | Olympic Stadium | ran.de | Recap |
| 3 | July 4 | 15:00 | at Frankfurt Galaxy | L 13–22 | 2–1 | PSD Bank Arena | ProSieben Maxx | Recap |
| 4 | July 18 | 15:00 | at Berlin Thunder | W 45–26 | 3–1 | Friedrich-Ludwig-Jahn-Sportpark | ProSieben Maxx | Recap |
| 5 | July 24 | 15:00 | Hamburg Sea Devils | L 23–26 | 3–2 | Olympic Stadium | More Than Sports TV | Recap |
| 6 | August 1 | 15:00 | at Cologne Centurions | L 31–33 | 3–3 | Südstadion | | |
| 7 | August 15 | 18:00 | Frankfurt Galaxy | L 7–36 | 3–4 | Olympic Stadium | | Recap |
| 8 | August 22 | 15:00 | at Hamburg Sea Devils | W 30–24 | 4–4 | Stadion Hoheluft | | Recap |
| 9 | August 28 | 20:00 | Berlin Thunder | W 12–35 | 5–4 | Olympic Stadium | | Recap |
| 10 | September 5 | 15:00 | at Leipzig Kings | W 21–13 | 6–4 | Alfred-Kunze-Sportpark | | |

Source: europeanleague.football

== Roster ==
Panthers Wrocław roster
| Quarterbacks: 2 Lukas O'Connor (United States); Running backs: 13 Damian Kwiatkowski (Poland); 24 Phileas Pasqualini (France); 29 Kamil Kotlarz (Poland); 30 Paweł Barul (Poland); 40 Konrad Starczewski (Poland); Wide receivers: 7 Jakub Wąsiel (Poland); 14 Kacper Fiedziuk (Poland); 15 Bartosz Dziedzic (Poland); 16 Wiktor Zięba (Poland); 23 Jakub Mazan (Poland); 81 Michał Goszczyński (Poland); 82 Przemysław Banat (Poland); 85 Oskar Wypych (Poland); 12 KaVontae Turpin (United States); Tight ends: 10 Miłosz Maćków (Poland); 44 Kacper Bogdański (Poland); 87 Igor Mašlanka (Slovakia) | Offensive linemen: 55 Rafał Rogaczewski (Poland); 65 Kamil Piątek (Poland); 68 Kajetan Korżyński (Poland); 70 Marek Stajer (Poland); 71 Kamil Kur (Poland); 73 Damian Krawiec (Poland); 74 Murilo Silva (Brazil); 79 Eduardo Gonzalez (Spain); Defensive linemen: 50 Szymon Adamczyk (Poland); 56 Kacper Pawlak (Poland); 90 Jacek Wszół (Poland); 92 Adrian Brudny (Poland); 94 Karlis Brauns (Latvia); 95 Szymon Grzebieniak (Poland); 96 Piotr Ostrowski (Poland); 97 Łukasz Gembara (Poland); 98 Mateusz Dymek (Poland); 99 Robert Rosołek (Poland) | Linebackers: 4 William Lloyd (United States); 6 Kamil Ruta (Poland); 8 Hubert Ogrodowczyk (Poland); 21 Przemysław Lewszyk (Poland); 22 Jarosław Lewszyk (Poland); 42 Jan Chmiel (Poland); 45 Tomasz Kiszka (Poland); 47 Antoni Idziak (Poland); 49 Kacper Ołdak (Poland); Defensive backs: 1 Darius Robinson (United States); 3 Szymon Jarmołkowicz (Poland); 5 Goran Zec (Serbia); 9 Tobiasz Witalis (Poland); 19 Daniel Piątkowski (Poland); 20 Kacper Rokiciński (Poland); 26 Marcin Osumek (Poland); 27 Jakub Halicki (Poland); 28 Pierre Courageux (France); 31 Szymon Romanowski (Poland); Special teams: 11 Dawid Pańczyszyn K (Poland); Tadhg Leader K (Republic of Ireland) | Reserve lists: 25 Mark Herndon RB (IR) (United States); Rookies in italics Roster updated 29 July 2021 |
