= 2025 Nordic Storm season =

American football team in Denmark

- General manager: (Denmark) Palle Christensen
- Head coach: (United States) John Shoop
- Defensive coordinator: (United States) Brandon Noble
- Home stadium: Gladsaxe Stadium

The 2025 Nordic Storm season is the inaugural season of the Nordic Storm team in the European League of Football for the 2025 season.

== Preseason ==
The Storm were announced to join the European League of Football on September 21, 2024. They are regarded as representing both Copenhagen, Denmark, and Malmö, Sweden, the two cities connected by the Øresund Bridge. This makes them the first ELF franchise in Scandinavia and the first one to represent two countries. Players from both Denmark and Sweden are considered homegrown players under the league's rules. The Storm will play their inaugural season at Gladsaxe Stadium in Søborg.

On October 3, 2024, former NFL offensive coordinator and Munich Ravens head coach John Shoop was named as the Nordic Storm's first head coach. First players signed were quarterback Jadrian Clark and running back Glen Toonga. Both played for the ELF champion Rhein Fire for the 2023 and 2024 seasons, and were MVP in this seasons. The first Danish player was Joachim Christensen (ELF champion with Frankfurt Galaxy in 2021), the first Swedish signing was Ludvig Myrén, who had played for the Berlin Thunder for the last three years.

== Regular season ==
=== Standings ===
North Division
| Pos | Team | GP | W | L | DIV | PF | PA | DIFF | STK | Qualification |
|---|---|---|---|---|---|---|---|---|---|---|
| 1 | Nordic Storm | 12 | 10 | 2 | 5–1 | 432 | 201 | +231 | L1 | Automatic playoffs (#4) |
| 2 | Rhein Fire | 12 | 8 | 4 | 5–1 | 348 | 214 | +134 | W4 | Advance to playoffs (#5) |
| 3 | Hamburg Sea Devils | 12 | 3 | 9 | 2–4 | 196 | 396 | −200 | W1 | |
| 4 | Berlin Thunder | 12 | 3 | 9 | 0–6 | 313 | 432 | −119 | L4 | |

Source: europeanleague.football

=== Schedule ===
| Week | Date | Opponent (Note: Intra-Conference games are in italics) | Result | Record | Venue | Att. | Recap |
| 1 | May 18 | at Helvetic Mercenaries | 56–12 | 1–0 | Lidl Arena, Wil | | |
| 2 | May 25 | at Panthers Wroclaw | 40–21 | 2–0 | Stadion Olimpijski | | |
| 3 | June 1 | at Berlin Thunder | 35–0 | 3–0 | Gladsaxe Stadion | | |
| 4 | bye | | | | | | |
| 5 | June 15 | Frankfurt Galaxy | 35–0 | 4–0 | Gladsaxe Stadion | | |
| 6 | June 21 | Panthers Wroclaw | 47–19 | 5–0 | Gladsaxe Stadion | | |
| 7 | June 28 | Helvetic Mercenaries | 35–0 | 6–0 | Gladsaxe Stadion | | |
| 8 | July 6 | at Hamburg Sea Devils | 27–21 | 7–0 | Stadion Hoheluft, Hamburg | | |
| 9 | July 13 | Rhein Fire | 25–24 | 8–0 | Gladsaxe Stadion | | |
| 10 | July 20 | at Berlin Thunder | 53–35 | 9–0 | Friedrich-Ludwig-Jahn-Sportpark, Berlin | | |
| 11 | July 27 | at Frankfurt Galaxy | 20–35 | 9–1 | PSD Bank Arena, Frankfurt | | |
| 12 | bye | | | | | | |
| 13 | August 10 | Hamburg Sea Devils | | | Gladsaxe Stadion | | |
| 14 | August 17 | at Rhein Fire | | | Schauinsland-Reisen-Arena, Duisburg | | |

Source: elfdata.eu

=== Game summaries ===
Helvetic Mercenaries vs. Nordic Storm

| Quarter | 1 | 2 | 3 | 4 | Total |
|---|---|---|---|---|---|
| Storm | 0 | 25 | 6 | 25 | 56 |
| Mercenaries | 0 | 6 | 6 | 0 | 12 |

at Lidl Arena, Wil, Switzerland

- Date: 18 May 2025
- Game attendance: 2,300

Game information

First quarter

- no scoring plays

Second quarter

- NDS – Glen Toonga 14-yard run (missed kick), 10:34. Storm 6–0. Drive: 9 plays, 93 yards, 4:10.
- NDS – Mikkel Hansen 2-yard pass from Jadrian Clark (Julius Eriksen kick), 6:16. Storm 13–0. Drive: 6 plays, 57 yards, 2:41.
- HVM – Isaiah Weed 69-yard run (missed kick), 4:57. Storm 13–6. Drive: 4 plays, 78 yards, 1:19.
- NDS – Brendan Beaulieu 18-yard pass from Jadrian Clark (missed kick), 3:48. Storm 19–6. Drive: 4 plays, 61 yards, 1:09.
- NDS – Adria Botella 5-yard pass from Jadrian Clark (missed kick), 1:46. Storm 25–6. Drive: 4 plays, 16 yards, 0:35.

Third quarter

- HVM – Nathan Tompsett 41-yard opposition fumble return (failed 2-point rush), 6:34. Storm 25–12.
- NDS – Alexander Kennedy Chaanhing 22-yard run (failed 2-point rush), 3:18. Storm 31–12. Drive: 4 plays, 45 yards, 3:16.

Fourth quarter

- NDS – Adria Botella 7-yard pass from Jadrian Clark (blocked extra point), 9:37. Storm 37–12. Drive: 9 plays, 60 yards, 4:35.
- NDS – Luke Glenna 70-yard interception return (missed kick), 8:15. Storm 43–12.
- NDS – Brendan Beaulieu 14-yard pass from Jadrian Clark (Jakob Niemann Green kick), 4:41. Storm 50–12. Drive: 5 plays, 50 yards, 2:37.
- NDS – Anton Witmeur 36-yard run (missed kick), 2:20. Storm 56–12. Drive: 3 plays, 45 yards, 1:26.

Top passers

- NDS – Jadrian Clark – 20/30, 258 yards, 5 TD
- HVM – Isaiah Weed – 17/29, 200 yards, INT

Top rushers

- NDS – Glen Toonga – 12 rushes, 114 yards, TD
- HVM – Isaiah Weed – 14 rushes, 104 yards, TD

Top receivers

- NDS – Brendan Beaulieu – 9 receptions, 115 yards, 2 TD
- HVM – Keelan Cole, Sr. – 6 receptions, 95 yards

Panthers Wrocław vs. Nordic Storm

| Quarter | 1 | 2 | 3 | 4 | Total |
|---|---|---|---|---|---|
| Storm | 6 | 14 | 0 | 20 | 40 |
| Panthers | 2 | 3 | 9 | 7 | 21 |

at Stadion Olimpijski, Wrocław, Poland

- Date: 25 May 2025
- Game attendance: 2,952

Game information

First quarter

- NDS – Brendan Beaulieu 2-yard pass from Jadrian Clark (blocked extra point), 8:50. Storm 6–0. Drive: 6 plays, 27 yards, 6:10.
- WPA – Devan Burrell extra point return, 8:50. Storm 6–2.

Second quarter

- WPA – Jakub Aldas 28-yard field goal, 9:50. Storm 6–5. Drive: 9 plays, 29 yards, 4:58.
- NDS – Alexander Kennedy Chaanhing 57-yard run (failed 2-point pass from Jadrian Clark), 6:41. Storm 12–5. Drive: 6 plays, 86 yards, 3:09.
- NDS – Brendan Beaulieu 53-yard pass from Jadrian Clark (Brendan Beaulieu 2-point pass from Jadrian Clark), 1:52. Storm 20–5. Drive: 7 plays, 91 yards, 2:46.

Third quarter

- WPA – Dawid Brzozowski 9-yard pass from DJ Irons (failed 2-point rush), 10:14. Storm 20–11. Drive: 9 plays, 83 yards, 4:46.
- WPA – Jakub Aldas 35-yard field goal, 6:11. Storm 20–14. Drive: 5 plays, 19 yards, 2:11.

Fourth quarter

- NDS – Simon Foens 16-yard pass from Jadrian Clark (Anton Witmeur 2-point pass from Jadrian Clark), 13:33. Storm 28–14. Drive: 9 plays, 80 yards, 4:53.
- NDS – Adria Botella 19-yard pass from Jadrian Clark (failed 2-point rush), 5:52. Storm 34–14. Drive: 10 plays, 63 yards, 5:57.
- NDS – Brendan Beaulieu 23-yard pass from Jadrian Clark (failed 2-point pass from Jadrian Clark), 2:56. Storm 40–14. Drive: 7 plays, 55 yards, 1:52.
- WPA – Devan Burrell 100-yard kick return (Jakub Aldas kick), 2:56. Storm 40–21.

Top passers

- NDS – Jadrian Clark – 24/32, 303 yards, 5 TD
- WPA – DJ Irons – 20/30, 181 yards, TD

Top rushers

- NDS – Alexander Kennedy Chaanhing – 10 rushes, 98 yards, TD
- WPA – DJ Irons – 13 rushes, 119 yards

Top receivers

- NDS – Brendan Beaulieu – 11 receptions, 151 yards, 3 TD
- WPA – Darrell Stewart, Jr. – 9 receptions, 66 yards

Nordic Storm vs. Berlin Thunder

| Quarter | 1 | 2 | 3 | 4 | Total |
|---|---|---|---|---|---|
| Thunder | 0 | 0 | 0 | 0 | 0 |
| Storm | 6 | 16 | 0 | 13 | 35 |

at Gladsaxe Stadium, Søborg, Denmark

- Date: 1 June 2025
- Game attendance: 2,493

Game information

First quarter

- NDS – Luke Glenna 69-yard blocked field goal return (blocked extra point), 9:43. Storm 6–0.

Second quarter

- NDS – Adria Botella 2-yard pass from Jadrian Clark (Brendan Beaulieu 2-point pass from Jadrian Clark), 12:36. Storm 14–0. Drive: 5 plays, 29 yards, 2:08.
- NDS – Jordan Genmark Heath 1-yard run (Brendan Beaulieu 2-point pass from Jadrian Clark), 6:35. Storm 22–0. Drive: 8 plays, 77 yards, 3:39.

Third quarter

- no scoring plays

Fourth quarter

- NDS – Jonathan Steinhauer Nielsen 6-yard pass from Jadrian Clark (failed 2-point rush), 12:10. Storm 28–0. Drive: 6 plays, 58 yards, 4:46.
- NDS – Brendan Beaulieu 70-yard pass from Jadrian Clark (Jakob Niemann Green kick), 6:34. Storm 35–0. Drive: 4 plays, 83 yards, 2:37.

Top passers

- BTH – Jakeb Sullivan – 17/24, 137 yards, INT
- NDS – Jadrian Clark – 22/38, 296 yards, 3 TD

Top rushers

- BTH – Adrian Peter – 5 rushes, 15 yards
- NDS – Anton Witmeur – 12 rushes, 49 yards

Top receivers

- BTH – Niklas Schumm – 6 receptions, 56 yards
- NDS – Brendan Beaulieu – 8 receptions, 129 yards, TD

Nordic Storm vs. Frankfurt Galaxy

| Quarter | 1 | 2 | 3 | 4 | Total |
|---|---|---|---|---|---|
| Galaxy | 0 | 0 | 0 | 0 | 0 |
| Storm | 16 | 13 | 0 | 6 | 35 |

at Gladsaxe Stadium, Søborg, Denmark

- Date: 15 June 2025
- Game attendance: 1,937

Game information

First quarter

- NDS – Brendan Beaulieu 25-yard pass from Jadrian Clark (Adria Botella 2-point pass from Jadrian Clark), 10:04. Storm 8–0. Drive: 9 plays, 73 yards, 4:56.
- NDS – Jordan Genmark Heath 1-yard run (Jordan Genmark Heath 2-point rush), 8:25. Storm 16–0. Drive: 3 plays, 12 yards, 0:55.

Second quarter

- NDS – Alexander Kennedy Chaanhing 19-yard run (Jakob Niemann Green kick), 13:23. Storm 23–0. Drive: 6 plays, 58 yards, 2:59.
- NDS – Adria Botella 45-yard pass from Jadrian Clark (failed 2-point pass from Jadrian Clark), 7:15. Storm 29–0. Drive: 6 plays, 77 yards, 3:05.

Third quarter

- no scoring plays

Fourth quarter

- NDS – Edvin Almeida 4-yard pass from Jadrian Clark (missed kick), 7:56. Storm 35–0. Drive: 8 plays, 80 yards, 3:37.

Top passers

- FGY – Matthew McKay – 24/34, 190 yards, 2 INT
- NDS – Jadrian Clark – 17/27, 273 yards, 3 TD

Top rushers

- FGY – Sandro Platzgummer – 6 rushes, 43 yards
- NDS – Anton Witmeur – 5 rushes, 39 yards

Top receivers

- FGY – Kevin Kaya – 6 receptions, 63 yards
- NDS – Brendan Beaulieu – 6 receptions, 127 yards, TD

== Roster ==
Nordic Storm roster
| Quarterbacks: 12 (Denmark) Alexander Bjerre; 18 (United States) Jadrian Clark; Running backs: 2 (Sweden) Jordan Genmark Heath; 8 (Sweden) Alexander Kennedy; 30 (Sweden) Alexander Nesic; 42 (France) Armand Soulerot; 21 (Denmark) Anton Witmeur; Wide receivers: 85 (Denmark) Oscar Andersen; 19 (United States) Brendan Beaulieu; 1 (Denmark) Simon Føns; 85 (Denmark) Jakob Green; 82 (Sweden) Elliot Reer; 5 (Sweden) Edvin Taborda; Tight ends: 87 (Spain) Adria Botella; 4 (Denmark) Jonathan Nielsen; 88 (Denmark) Oliver Tribler | Offensive linemen: 51 (Sweden) Ludvig Burell T; 75 (Denmark) Joachim Christensen C; 79 (Denmark) Frederik Fabricius T; 63 (Denmark) Mikkel Hansen C; 74 (Denmark) Mathias Hummelmose T; 68 (Sweden) Love Larsson G; 60 (Denmark) Nicholas Møller-Hansen G; 65 (Denmark) Benjamin Qvist G; 78 (Iceland) Stefán Stefánsson T; 52 (Sweden) David Strobel G; 77 (Sweden) Samuel Wretman T; Defensive linemen: 15 (Sweden) Benjamin Egbudiwe DT; 93 (Denmark) Kristoffer Hansen DT; 91 (Denmark) Joachim Heidelbach DE; 67 (Sweden) Elliot Heijmer DT; 13 (Sweden) Emil Hovde DE; 95 (Denmark) Mads Neilsen DT; 97 (United Kingdom) Max Parkinson DE; 90 (Sweden) Mark-Eric Rosenquist DT | Linebackers: 40 (Sweden) Joshua Akena; 55 (Sweden) Hugo Dyrendahl; 44 (United Kingdom) Emmanuelle Falola MLB; 48 (Denmark) Kristoffer Jensen; 41 (Sweden) Edvin Jönsson ILB; 39 (Denmark) Edin Mahmutovic; 38 (Denmark) Lucas Mortensen; 6 (Denmark) David Tawake; Defensive backs: 22 (Denmark) Jakob Bækgaard FS; 23 (United States) Clifton Duck CB; 10 (United States) Luke Glenna FS; 27 (Denmark) Christopher Jørgensen FS; 25 (United Kingdom) Khalid Adisa CB; 33 (Sweden) Elliot Krogius CB; 20 (Denmark) Kenneth Larsen-Ledet FS; 9 (Denmark) Hjalmar Nielsen SS; 3 (United Kingdom) Chad Walrond SS; Special teams: 14 (Denmark) Julius Eriksen K | Reserve lists: -- (Denmark) Jakob Blønd K; -- (Sweden) Morgan Boney T; 99 (Denmark) Marcus Boesen DE; 11 (Denmark) Philip Boye SS; 7 (United States) Exavier Edwards CB; -- (Denmark) Sverri Finsson LB; 24 (Sweden) William James FS; -- (Sweden) Ola Kimrin K; 0 (Sweden) Ludvig Myrén LB; 80 (Sweden) Olof Nilsson WR; 17 (United Kingdom) Glen Toonga RB; Practice squad: -- (Denmark) Michel Konate RB; 34 (Denmark) Oscar Latrache CB; 83 (Denmark) Martin Møller WR; Rookies in italics Roster updated Jul 29, 2025; 4 A-import, 4 E-import, 45 homegrown 53 active, 3 practice squad |
