= 2021 Leipzig Kings season =

- Head coach: (United States) Fred Armstrong
- Home stadium: Alfred-Kunze-Sportpark

Results
- Record: 5–5

Uniform
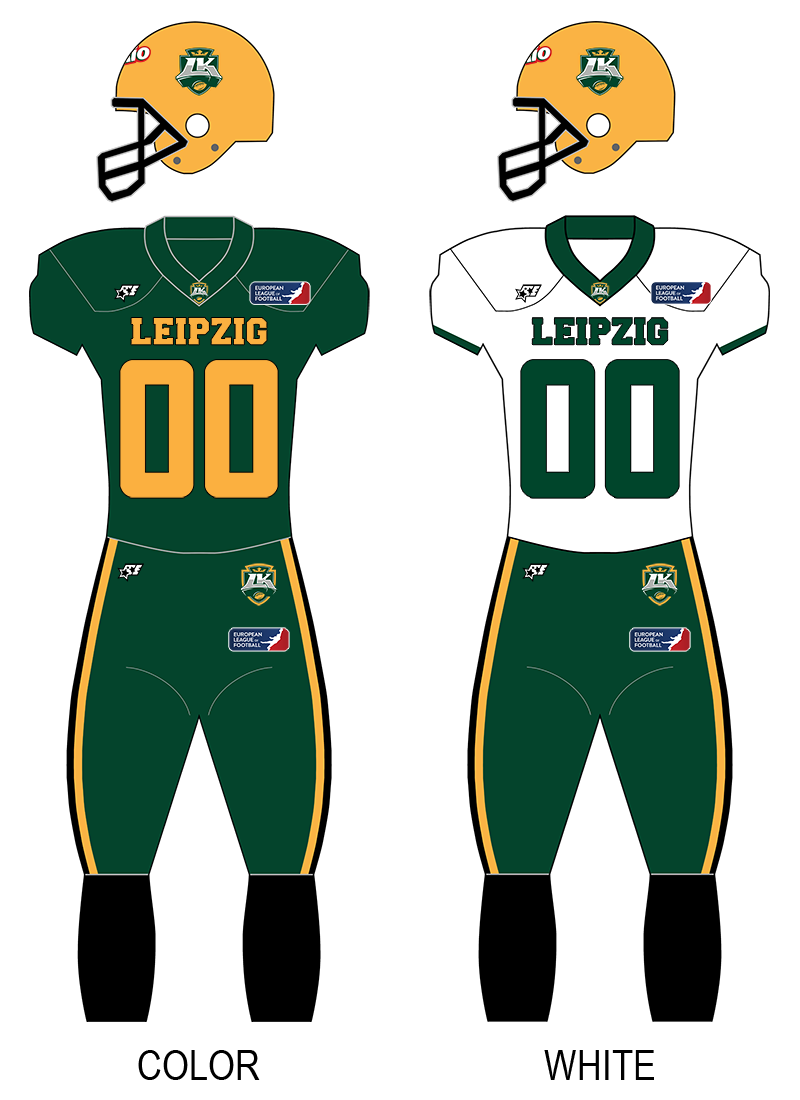

The 2021 Leipzig Kings season was the inaugural European League of Football season in Leipzig Kings history.

== Regular season ==
=== Standings ===
North Division
Pos	Team	GP	W	L	PF	PA	Div	Qualification
1	(Germany) Hamburg Sea Devils	10	7	3	274	178	4–2	Advance to playoffs
2	(Poland) Wrocław Panthers	10	6	4	314	259	5–1	Advance to playoffs
3	(Germany) Leipzig Kings	10	5	5	295	320	3–3	
4	(Germany) Berlin Thunder	10	3	7	228	296	0–6	

Source: europeanleague.football

=== Schedule ===
Week	Date	Time (CET)	Opponent	Result	Record	Venue	TV (Note: All games can also be watched live on ELF Gamepass)	Recap
1	June 20	15:00	at Berlin Thunder	W 37–27	1–0	Amateurstadion Olympiapark	More Than Sports TV	Recap
2	June 26	18:00	at Wrocław Panthers	L 28–54	1–1	Wrocław Olympic Stadium	ran.de	Recap
3	July 4	15:00	Cologne Centurions	L 47–48	1–2	Alfred-Kunze-Sportpark		Recap
4	July 11	15:00	at Stuttgart Surge	L 24–27	1–3	Gazi-Stadion auf der Waldau	ProSieben Maxx	Recap
5	July 18	15:00	Hamburg Sea Devils	L 0–55	1–4	Alfred-Kunze-Sportpark		Recap
6	August 1	15:00	Berlin Thunder	W 37–24	2–4	Alfred-Kunze-Sportpark	ProSieben Maxx	Recap
7	August 8	15:00	Stuttgart Surge	W 49–23	3–4	Alfred-Kunze-Sportpark		Recap
8	August 21	15:00	at Cologne Centurions	W 24–42	4–4	Ostkampfbahn		Recap
9	August 29	15:00	at Hamburg Sea Devils	W 18–17	5–4	Stadion Hoheluft		Recap
10	September 5	15:00	Wrocław Panthers	L 13–21	5–5	Alfred-Kunze-Sportpark		

Source: europeanleague.football

Despite finishing with an identical 5–5 record as the Cologne Centurions and having scored more points in their two head-to-head games, Leipzig missed out on playoff participation, as the mode for the 2021 season guaranteed playoff spots to the top two teams of each division regardless of record.

== Roster ==
Leipzig Kings roster
Quarterbacks: 3 Michael Birdsong (United States); 15 Tom Van Duijn (Netherlands); Running backs: 2 Jason Aguemon (France); 22 Raymond Sobowale (England); 23 Moritz Herzel; 24 Tony Kulok; 27 Luc Schneider; Wide receivers: 6 Timothy Knüttel; 8 Alpha Jalloh (United States); 11 Anthony Dablé (France); 12 Jaleel Awini (United States); 80 Markus Riedel; 81 Antonio Fischer; 82 Jeremy Lang; 83 Joshua Lang; 84 Yoshihito Omi (Japan); 89 Nils Baeumer	Offensive linemen: 70 Shalom Baafi; 71 Florian Barthel; 72 Jonas Hagerup (Norway); 73 Max Bruder; 74 Tilman Brütsch; 75 Sven Hinrichs; 76 Per Kristian Molberg (Norway); 77 Robert Kalke; 78 Christoph Schob; 79 Viktor Weiderspahn; Defensive linemen: 42 Philipp Mingerzahn; 56 Lance Leota (New Zealand); 90 Steven Kühne; 91 Dustin Dennerlein; 92 Aslan Zetterberg (Sweden); 93 Christopher Hans; 99 Vincent Buffet (France)	Linebackers: 40 Olav Røhnebæk (Norway); 47 Maximilian Fitz; 48 Luca Lampe; 51 Mirko Parnow; 52 Chris Schlack; 53 Pascal Topolewski; 54 Martin Strauss; Defensive backs: 4 Roedion Henrique (Netherlands); 7 Benhwoll Tchiyoko (France); 10 Shida Wang (China); 17 Simon Braun; 21 Daniel Docal (Spain); 25 Anastassiadis Kiriakos; 26 Florian Borger; 33 Paul Meissner; Special teams: 1 Jacob Templar (Australia); 85 Marcel Ulbrich	Rookies in italics Roster updated 25 May 2021
