= Stuttgart Surge =

American football team in Germany

Logo

General information
- Founded: November 4, 2020
- Folded: 2025
- Headquartered: Stuttgart, Germany
- Colors: Blue, lime, white

Personnel
- Owners: Steffen Korinth; Erwin & Martin Schmidt; Jakob Johnson
- General manager: Suni Musa
- Head coach: Jordan Neuman

Team history
- Stuttgart Surge

Home fields
- Gazi-Stadion auf der Waldau

League / conference affiliations
- European League of Football (2021–2025): South Conference (2021); Central Conference (2022–2024); West Division (2025)

Championships
- League championships: 1; 2025
- Conference championships: 2; 2023, 2024
- Division championships: 1; 2025

Playoff appearances (3)
- 2023, 2024, 2025

The Stuttgart Surge were a professional American football team based in Stuttgart, Germany. The Surge competed in the European League of Football (ELF) from 2021 to 2025. The Surge have won three division titles and played in two ELF championship game, having lost to the Rhein Fire, 34–53 at the 2023 ELF Championship Game and having won the 2025 ELF Championship Game against the Vienna Vikings.

The club played their home games at the Gazi Stadion (full name with sponsor Gazi-Stadion auf der Waldau) which is currently the oldest sports stadium in Germany still in use.

== Franchise history ==
The Stuttgart franchise was one of the eight founding members of the European League of Football (ELF), established in 2020. Initially, the franchise was supposed to start as the Stuttgart Scorpions, adopting the name of Stuttgart's German Football League (GFL) team. Since the member's assembly of the Stuttgart Scorpions decided to disallow the use of the name, the team formed as Stuttgart Surge reviving the World League of American Football (WLAF) "Surge" franchise of the 1992 World Bowl champion Sacramento Surge.

The World League of American Football was later renamed the NFL Europe. The label Surge was picked over the name Stallions in compliance of the former 1980s and 1990s American football team Stuttgart Stallions and determines the design of the new club logo and ensign. The franchise is operated by the American Football Club Stuttgart GmbH, whose general manager Timo Franke previously worked as gameday manager for the Stuttgart Scorpions. Martin Hanselmann, the former coach of Germany's national American football team was signed as head coach in 2021.

The team played their first game in the new league against the Barcelona Dragons (ELF) on June 19, 2021, with a 17–21 victory. In their week 2 loss to Frankfurt Galaxy starting Quarterback Jacob Wright was ejected for using a racially charged insult against an opponent for which he was ultimately cut from Stuttgart Surge and banned from playing for any ELF team for the ongoing 2021 season. The new Quarterback Aaron Ellis was presented ahead of the week 3 matchup against Berlin Thunder (ELF). After two consecutive losses during the end of the season, the team finished last in the South division and did not qualify for the playoffs.

The front office and owner structure changed significantly in preparation for the 2022 European League of Football season. Former general manager Timo Franke handed the office over to Suni Musa, but staying in the organisation as head of sales and sponsoring. On February 4, 2022, it was revealed that New England Patriots fullback and Stuttgart native Jakob Johnson will become co-owner of the franchise.

After seven consecutive defeats, Martin Hanselmann resigned from his post as head coach. His interim successor was George Streeter. However, the team could not increase noticeably and ended the season without a win. After the season, Streeter became Director of Player Personnel and Development.

On October 18, 2022, Surge signed Jordan Neuman as new Head Coach and Offensive Coordinator. Neuman previously was head coach of the Schwäbisch Hall Unicorns, and won the German Bowl 2022. Along with him, defensive coordinator Johannes Brenner and assistant Cody Pastorino joined from the Unicorns. The new coaches led the team to a 10-2 record. Surge won the Wild Card game vs Panthers Wrocław with 37-14, and the semi final at the Vienna Vikings with 40-33. In the ELF championship game, Surge faced Rhein Fire, but lost the game with 34-53.

=== Season-by-season ===
Season	Head coach	Regular season					Postseason				Result	Ø Attendance
Season	Head coach	GP	Won	Lost	Win %	Finish	GP	Won	Lost	Win %	Result	Ø Attendance
2021	Martin Hanselmann	10	2	8	.200	4th (South)	DNQ					1,429
2022	Martin Hanselmann	12	0	12	.000	4th (Central)	DNQ					2,084
2023	Jordan Neuman	12	10	2	.833	1st (Central)	3	2	1	.667	2nd	3,901
2024	Jordan Neuman	12	11	1	.917	1st (Central)	1	0	1	.000	—	
2025	Jordan Neuman	12	10	2	.833	1st (West)	3	3	0	1.000	1st	

== Logos ==
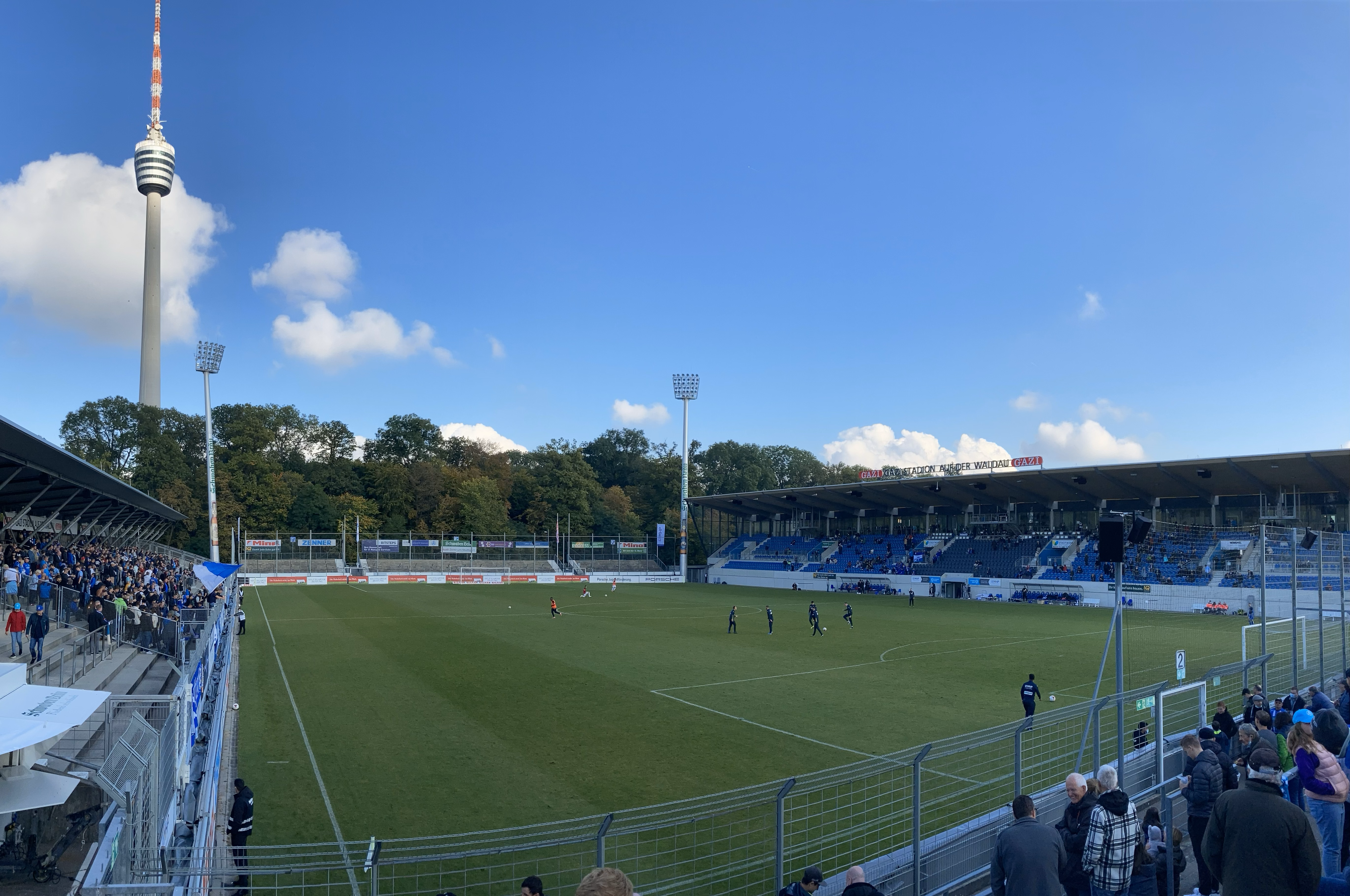
TV tower and Stadion auf der Waldau

With the presentation of the new team name in 2021, the franchise unveiled two logos for their first season. The design of the major logo uses the form of the Stuttgart TV tower which is located near the stadium. It is both a landmark for the town as well as for the region. The logo features the team colors yellow and blue with the tower shaft and the antenna depicting a stylized lightning bolt. The tower basket features the team name in white on a dark ground. The minor logo just shows a stylized lightning bolt in yellow pointing to the right and features optionally the team name or a multiangled line, both in a dark color.

== Roster ==
Stuttgart Surge roster
Quarterbacks: 4 (United States) Reilly Hennessey; 16 (Germany) Lars Heidrich; Running backs: 0 (Republic of Ireland) Tomiwa Oyewo; 2 (Germany) Kai Hunter; 22 (Germany) Albert Wiesigstrauch; 35 (United States) Micah McCullough; 41 (Germany) Bryan Yankson; 43 (Germany) León Helm FB; Wide receivers: 3 (United States) Mike Harley Jr. (Note: Replacement for Jeff Cotton); 7 (Germany) Louis Geyer; 8 (Germany) Leonell Fritzen; 10 (Germany) Florian Lengauer; 11 (Germany) Emil Rabin; 14 (Germany) Timon Stüwe; 17 (United Kingdom) Daniel Pedro; 18 (Germany) Aurieus Minton; 81 (Germany) Jan Pietsch; Tight ends: 40 (Germany) Giacomo De Pauli; 80 (Germany) Philip Eichhorn; 85 (United States) Roberto Miranda	Offensive linemen: 50 (Germany) Marvin Biegert C; 55 (Italy) Alessandro Vergani G; 57 (Germany) Marlon Werthmann T; 61 (Germany) Luca Jokiel T; 66 (Germany) Sascha Beck C; 67 (Germany) Markos Dubravkic G; 69 (Germany) Emmanuel Häfele T; 72 (Germany) Tobias Braun T; 74 (Germany) Robert Hager T; 75 (Germany) Moritz Schreiber C; 76 (Germany) Lukas Maier G; 78 (Germany) Benhur Arya; Defensive linemen: 6 (Germany) Robert Lachmann DE; 13 (Finland) Chris Mulumba DE; 52 (Germany) Dominic Siegel DE; 54 (Germany) Alexander Kreß DE; 60 (Germany) Nathan Kalemba DT; 70 (Germany) Maximilian Dommermuth DT; 90 (Germany) Raphael Zistler DT; 91 (Germany) Sadik Busch DE; 92 (Germany) Simon Butsch DE; 94 (Germany) Berend Grube DE; 97 (Germany) Leander Strathmann DE	Linebackers: 25 (Germany) Luis Leatherman MLB; 26 (Germany) Luca Siebert MLB; 30 (Germany) Lenno Reinhardt OLB; 32 (Germany) Luis Bach; 39 (Germany) Enis Kaser OLB; 44 (Germany) Maleka Japhet Mbala MLB; 45 (Germany) Lukas Levin MLB; 47 (Germany) Nikolas Knoblauch MLB; 49 (Germany) Felix Födinger OLB; 51 (Germany) Omar Dittrich MLB; Defensive backs: 5 (Germany) Konstantin Katz FS; 9 (Germany) Lasse Engel FS; 12 (United States) Raheem Wilson CB; 20 (Germany) Sarrow Drammeh CB; 21 (Germany) Julian Jakob CB; 23 (Italy) Giuseppe Della Vecchia CB; 24 (United States) Mitchel Fettig CB; 27 (Croatia) Marko Vidačković FS; 28 (Germany) Thiago Siebert CB; 29 (Germany) Julian Ludwig-Mayorga; 31 (Germany) Nick Wenzelburger S; 33 (Germany) Ben Wenzler CB; Special teams: 38 (Germany) Timo Bronn	Rookies in italics Roster updated 2 June 2025; 5 A-import, 5 E-import, 56 homegrown 66 active

== Staff ==
Stuttgart Surge staff
Front office: Owner – Steffen Korinth, Erwin & Martin Schmidt, Jakob Johnson; General Manager – Suni Musa; Director of Player Personnel and Development – George Streeter; Director of football operations/personnel – Jeremy Bryson; Head coach: Head coach – Jordan Neuman; Offensive coaches: Offensive coordinator – Jordan Neuman; Quarterbacks – n/a; Running backs – Joshua Tapscott; Wide receivers – Joseph Joyner; Tight ends/fullbacks – Jochen Holzinger; Offensive line – Hunter Sims	Defensive coaches: Defensive coordinator – Johannes Brenner; Assistant defensive coordinator – Cody Pastorino; Linebacker – Daniel McCray; Inside linebacker – David Zeller; Defensive line – Justin Bernthaler; Defensive backs – n/a; Special teams coaches: Special teams coordinator – n/a; Assistant coaches: Analytics coach – Friedemann Hees; Strength and conditioning: Strength and conditioning – Natalia Wisniewska; Head of Strength and conditioning – Corey Chapman; Staff updated 23 March 2023
