= Barcelona Dragons =

Two American football franchises have been referred to as the Barcelona Dragons:

- Barcelona Dragons (NFL Europe), active in the World League of American Football and the NFL Europe between 1991 and 2003;
- Barcelona Dragons (ELF), active in the European League of Football between 2021 and 2024.
