= 2026 Frankfurt Galaxy season =

- Owner: James Edward McGoldrick and others
- General manager: Eric Reutemann
- Head coach: (Germany) Thomas Kösling
- Home stadium: PSD Bank Arena

The 2026 Frankfurt Galaxy season is the sixth season of the Frankfurt Galaxy in the inaugural season of the European Football Alliance.

== Preseason ==
After the 2025 European League of Football (ELF) season, the franchise union European Football Alliance, with Frankfurt Galaxy as its inaugural member, declared its intention to leave the ELF in order to organise a league of its own. Subsequent negotiations with the ELF failed, so that the independent EFA League was finally founded in mid-January 2026.

Thomas Kösling, Galaxy head coach from 2021 to 2024 and director of sports in 2025, changed back to the head coach position for the 2026 season.

== Regular season ==
=== Standings ===
Pos	Team	Pld	W	L	PF	PA	PD	Qualification
1	z – Nordic Storm	10	9	1	411	141	+270	Qualification to BIG4
2	x – Munich Ravens	10	9	1	396	228	+168	Qualification to BIG4
3	x – Frankfurt Galaxy	10	4	6	233	313	−80	Qualification to BIG4
4	x – Paris Musketeers	10	4	6	215	300	−85	Qualification to BIG4
5	e – Raiders Tirol	10	2	8	264	362	−98	
6	e – Prague Lions	10	2	8	223	398	−175	

Source: European Leagues Football Data Lab

Tiebreaker: Total Wins, Winning Percentage, Head-to-Head Record, Strength of Victory (SOV), Total Points Differential (capped at ±35 points per game), Total Points Scored, Points Differential in Head-to-Head Games, Away Wins, Coin Toss.
Legend

x — Clinched playoff berth
z — Clinched regular season winner
e — Eliminated from playoffs

=== Schedule ===
Week	Date	Opponent	Result	Record	Venue	Att.	Recap
1	May 15	Paris Musketeers	20-21	0-1	PSD Bank Arena, Frankfurt	5,638	
2	bye						
3	May 30	Munich Ravens	26-45	0-2	PSD Bank Arena, Frankfurt	4,581	
4	June 6	at Raiders Tirol	5-21	1-2	PSD Bank Arena, Frankfurt	2,953	
5	June 14	at Nordic Storm	12-20	1-3	Gladsaxe Stadion, Søborg		
6	June 21	Prague Lions	31-18	2-3	PSD Bank Arena, Frankfurt	4,519	
7	bye						
8	July 5	at Paris Musketeers			Stade Essone, Bondoufle		
9	July 12	at Munich Ravens			Uhlsport Park, Unterhaching		
10	July 18	Raiders Tirol			PSD Bank Arena, Frankfurt		
11	bye						
12	August 2	Nordic Storm			Tivoli Stadion Tirol, Innsbruck		
13	August 9	at Prague Lions			FK Viktoria Stadion, Prague		
