= Frankfurt Galaxy =

Two American football franchises have been referred to as the Frankfurt Galaxy:

- Frankfurt Galaxy (NFL Europe), active in NFL Europe between 1991 and 2007
- Frankfurt Galaxy (ELF), active in the European League of Football since 2021
