= Myke Tavarres =

American football player (born 1992)

Profile
- Position: Linebacker

Personal information
- Born: November 18, 1992 (age 33); Lake Oswego, Oregon
- Listed height: 6 ft 2 in (1.88 m)
- Listed weight: 230 lb (104 kg)

Career information
- College: University of the Incarnate Word
- NFL draft: 2016: undrafted

Career history
- Philadelphia Eagles (2016)*; Hamilton Tiger-Cats (2017)*; Nebraska Danger (2018); Barcelona Dragons (2021); Leipzig Kings (2022)
- * Offseason or practice squad member only

Awards and highlights
- STATS FCS All-America First-Team; AP FCS All-America Second-Team

Myke Tavarres (born November 18, 1992) is an American linebacker who is currently free agent. Before that, he also played for the Barcelona Dragons, for the Leipzig Kings, both of the European League of Football and the Philadelphia Eagles in the NFL. He played college football for the Incarnate Word Cardinals football program where he was named multiple times first and second team All-American.

== Early life ==
Tavarres was born in Lake Oswego, Oregon as one of six children. He went to Lakeridge High School where he competed in wrestling, track and field and excelled in football. As a senior he collected 135 tackles, including 37 in two consecutive weeks, 5.0 sacks with one interception, two fumble recoveries and one forced fumble.

== College career ==
In 2011 he enrolled at College of the Siskiyous and played for the football varsity team. In two seasons he made 133 tackles with 25 tackles for loss. Additional 7 sacks and 3 interceptions brought him on the radar of other colleges. He enrolled in 2013 to the University of Arkansas. In 2014 he transferred again to the University of the Incarnate Word where he had to redshirt the year and played as a senior in 2015. There he made 66 solo tackles and 22.5 for loss as well as 8.5 sacks in 12 regular season games bringing him multiple awards. Tavarres also competed in track and field for Incarnate Word.

== Professional career ==
=== Philadelphia Eagles ===
After going undrafted in the 2016 NFL draft was signed as an undrafted free agent by the Philadelphia Eagles and played in all four preseason games of this season making him and his teammate Cole Wick the first UIW players in the NFL. There he scored 3 tackles and one QB hit, but was at the end released unexpectedly. It was speculated that the franchise released him because he wanted to join Colin Kaepernick in his protest.

=== Barcelona Dragons ===
After a short stint with the Hamilton Tiger-Cats and playing for the Nebraska Danger the Barcelona Dragons signed him for the 2021 European League of Football season. Tavarres led the Dragons with 99 total tackles and 16 tackles for loss in 2021 making him the runner-up for the defensive player of the year.

=== Leipzig Kings ===
On January 31, 2022, Tavarres signed a two-year contract with the Leipzig Kings for the 2022 European League of Football season.

=== Professional statistics ===
Year	Team	GP	Tackles						Interceptions				
Year	Team	GP	Cmb	Solo	Ast	TFL	Yds	Sck	FF	PD	Int	Yds	TD
European League of Football
2021	Barcelona Dragons	10	99			16		2.5	0	2	0	0	0
2022	Leipzig Kings	0	0	0	0	0	0	0	0	0	0	0	0
ELF total		10	99	0	0	16	0	2.5	0	2	0	0	0
Source: europeanleague.football

== Personal life ==
Tavarres studied communication arts at UIW.
