= Quinten Pounds =

American football player (born 1996)

Profile
- Position: Wide receiver

Personal information
- Born: December 31, 1996 (age 29); Cypress, California, U.S.
- Listed height: 6 ft 0 in (1.83 m)
- Listed weight: 180 lb (82 kg)

Career information
- High school: Cypress
- College: Washington
- NFL draft: 2020: undrafted

Career history
- Cologne Centurions (2021–2022); Reds de la Ciudad de México (2023)

Awards and highlights
- Second-team All-ELF (2022)

Career ELF statistics
- Receptions: 127
- Receiving yards: 1,675
- Return yards: 1,245
- Total touchdowns: 21

Quinten Pounds (born December 31, 1996) is an American football wide receiver. He played for the Cologne Centurions of the European League of Football. He played college football for the University of Washington.

== Early life ==
Pounds was born in Cypress, California and went to Cypress High School, where he participated in basketball and track and field as a high jumper, in addition to football. As a senior in 2014, he led the Centurions to an 8–3 record as the team's leading receiver (29 catches for 570 yards and eight touchdowns) and leading rusher (788 yards and 11 touchdowns), earning Empire League MVP and first-team All-County honors.

== College career ==
On October 29, 2014, Pounds committed to the University of Washington and the Washington Huskies football program. In five seasons he suffered three season ending injuries in 2015, 2017 and 2018. Because of that, he redshirted his 2016 freshman and 2017 sophomore year.

=== College statistics ===
Year	Team	GP	Receiving				Rushing			
Year	Team	GP	REC	Yds	Avg	TDs	Att	Yds	Avg	TDs
College Division I
2015	Washington	3	0	0	0	0	0	0	0	0
2016	Washington	14	6	86	14.3	1	0	0	0	0
2017	Washington	8	10	155	15.5	1	1	0	0	0
2018	Washington	7	8	166	20.8	1	0	0	0	0
2019	Washington	3	0	0	0	0	0	0	0	0
College total		35	24	407	17	3	1	0	0	0
Source: gohuskies.com

== Professional career ==
Pounds signed with the Cologne Centurions for the 2021 season as one of their four American imports. He recorded 666 receiving yards and eight touchdowns. On October 1, 2021, the franchise announced his contract extension for 2022. In his second season with the team, Pounds made 86 receptions for 1,009 yards and 13 touchdowns. He was named the team MVP.

=== Professional statistics ===
Year	Team	GP	Receiving				Rushing			
Year	Team	GP	REC	Yds	Avg	TDs	Att	Yds	Avg	TDs
European League of Football
2021	Cologne Centurions	8	45	669	14.9	8	0	0	0	0
2022	Cologne Centurions	12	86	1009	11.73	13	0	0	0	0
ELF total		20	131	1678	12.9	21	0	0	0	0
Source: EuropeanLeague.Football
