= Christopher Ezeala =

German-French gridiron football player (born 1995)

Profile
- Position: Fullback

Personal information
- Born: September 19, 1995 (age 31); Munich, Germany
- Listed height: 6 ft 0 in (1.83 m)
- Listed weight: 215 lb (98 kg)

Career information
- NFL draft: 2018: undrafted
- CFL draft: 2021G: 1st round, 5th overall pick

Career history
- Baltimore Ravens (2018–2020)*; Cologne Centurions (2021); Saskatchewan Roughriders (2021)
- * Offseason or practice squad member only

Career CFL statistics
- Games played: 11
- Stats at Pro Football Reference
- Stats at CFL.ca

Christopher Nwabuisi Ezeala (born September 19, 1995) is a former German-French professional gridiron football defensive lineman who played in one season for the Saskatchewan Roughriders of the Canadian Football League (CFL). He played for the Baltimore Ravens as part of the International Player Pathway Program in 2018.

== Biography ==
In his youth Ezeala played for the Feldkirchen Lions, München Rangers and as an adult for the Ingolstadt Dukes and the Allgäu Comets in the German Football League. He played mostly as a linebacker, but also as a defensive end and running back.

== Professional career ==
=== Baltimore Ravens ===
For his achievements in the national league he was selected for the International Player Pathway Program in 2018 of the National Football League and trained three months at IMG Academy in Florida, where he switched to the fullback position. From there he was allocated to the Baltimore Ravens.

After he played all five preseason games of the 2018 NFL season he signed a future/reserve contract for one year. Again in the 2019 NFL preseason he played in all four games, but didn't make the 53-man final roster. Instead he was placed on the practice squad with the additional international spot. Starting the 2020 NFL season his future/reserve contract wasn't extended, which made him free agent.

=== Cologne Centurions ===
In April 2021, he was signed by the Cologne Centurions from the newly formed European League of Football. In the first game of the 2021 season Ezeala scored a touchdown before he was injured in the 3rd quarter. The Centurions lost 39:55 against the Panthers Wrocław. Due to further injuries in the defense of the centurions he played linebacker and defensive end again. After three games he was released by the team for personal reasons.

=== Saskatchewan Roughriders ===
Also in April 2021, Ezeala was drafted in the first round of the 2021 CFL global draft from the Saskatchewan Roughriders in the Canadian Football League. After he left the Centurions in July, he traveled at the end of August to Regina and play on the practice squad of the Roughriders first. In the 2021 Saskatchewan Roughriders season, he played in eleven games as a fullback and defensive lineman.

=== Retirement ===
Before the 2022 CFL season, he announced his retirement from professional football.
