= Jakob Johnson =

German American football player (born 1994)

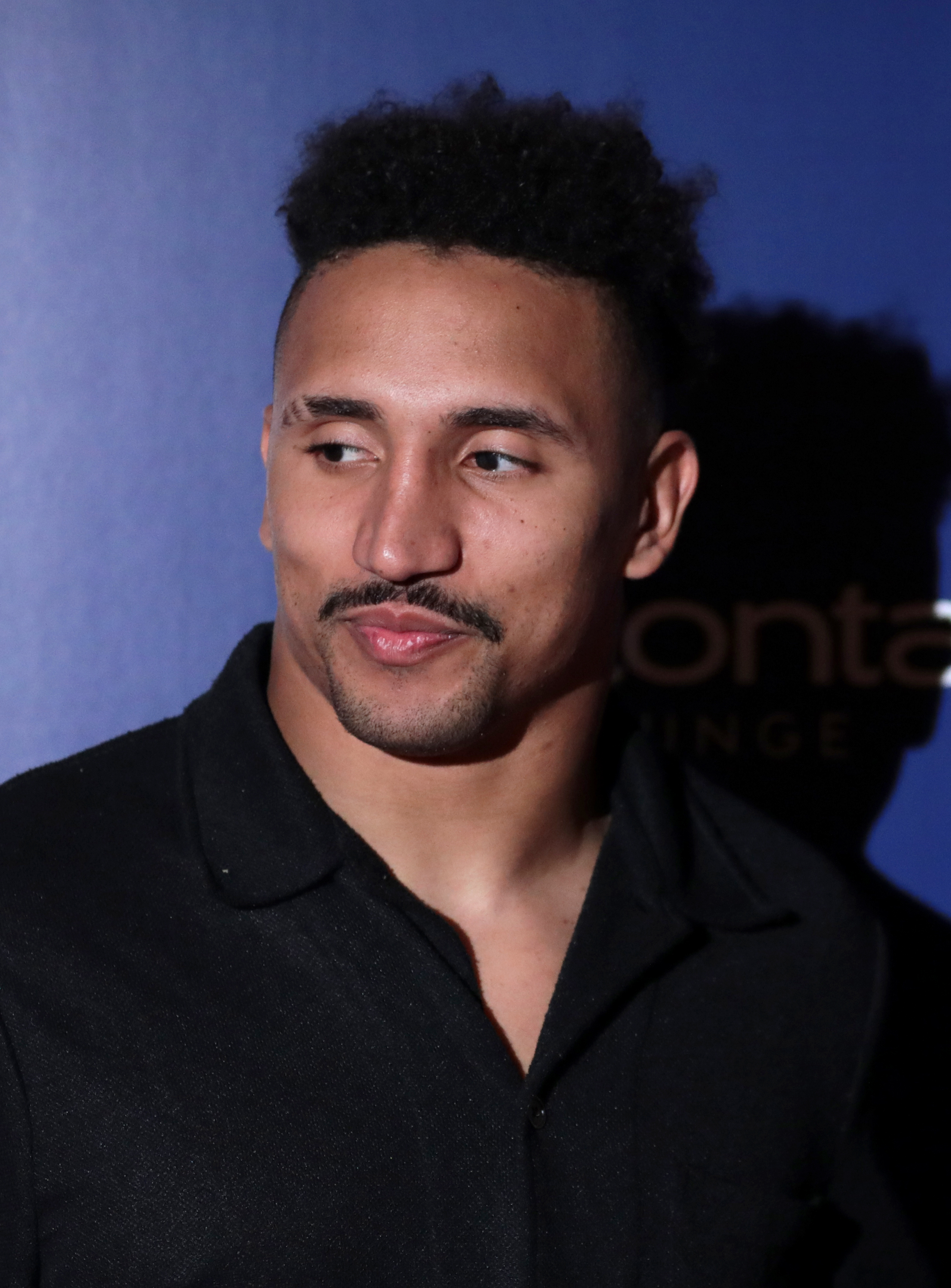
- Johnson in 2023

Profile
- Position: Fullback

Personal information
- Born: 15 December 1994 (age 31); Stuttgart, Baden-Württemberg, Germany
- Listed height: 6 ft 3 in (1.91 m)
- Listed weight: 255 lb (116 kg)

Career information
- High school: Jean Ribault (Jacksonville, Florida, U.S.)
- College: Tennessee (2014–2017)
- NFL draft: 2018: undrafted

Career history

Playing
- Stuttgart Scorpions (2018); New England Patriots (2019–2021); Las Vegas Raiders (2022–2023); New York Giants (2024); Houston Texans (2025)

Operations
- Stuttgart Surge (2022–present) Co-owner

Career NFL statistics as of 2025
- Receptions: 19
- Receiving yards: 105
- Receiving touchdowns: 1
- Stats at Pro Football Reference

Jakob Elijah Johnson (German pronunciation: [ˈjaːkɔp] YAH-kop; né Weinmann; born 15 December 1994) is a German-American professional football fullback. He played college football for the Tennessee Volunteers and signed with the New England Patriots in 2019 through the NFL's International Player Pathway Program. After three seasons in New England, Johnson played two seasons with the Las Vegas Raiders.

== Early life ==
Johnson was born in Stuttgart, Germany, on 15 December 1994 as Jakob Weinmann to an African-American father and German mother. He later took on his father's name Johnson. In 2013 he graduated from the technical Gymnasium Max-Eyth-Schule with the Abitur. He played for the Stuttgart Scorpions on the U19 team before moving to Jacksonville, Florida, in his senior year of high school. He was a four-star recruit in high school and joined the Tennessee Volunteers as a linebacker. At the University of Tennessee, he became a member of the Southeastern Conference Academic Honor Roll for three consecutive seasons and graduated with a degree in kinesiology. He is a member of the Omega Psi Phi fraternity.

== Professional career ==
Pre-draft measurables
Height	Weight	Arm length	Hand span	40-yard dash	10-yard split	20-yard split	20-yard shuttle	Three-cone drill
6 ft 2 7/8 in (1.90 m)	253 lb (115 kg)	31 7/8 in (0.81 m)	9 1/4 in (0.23 m)	5.15 s	1.79 s	2.96 s	4.51 s	7.49 s
All values from Pro Day

=== Stuttgart Scorpions ===
Following his graduation from the University of Tennessee in 2018, Johnson returned to the Stuttgart Scorpions of the German Football League where he would play for a year. Johnson had 43 receptions for 474 yards and four touchdowns and rushed 10 times for 46 yards in 12 games played. The Scorpions finished with a 4–12 record on the season.

=== New England Patriots ===
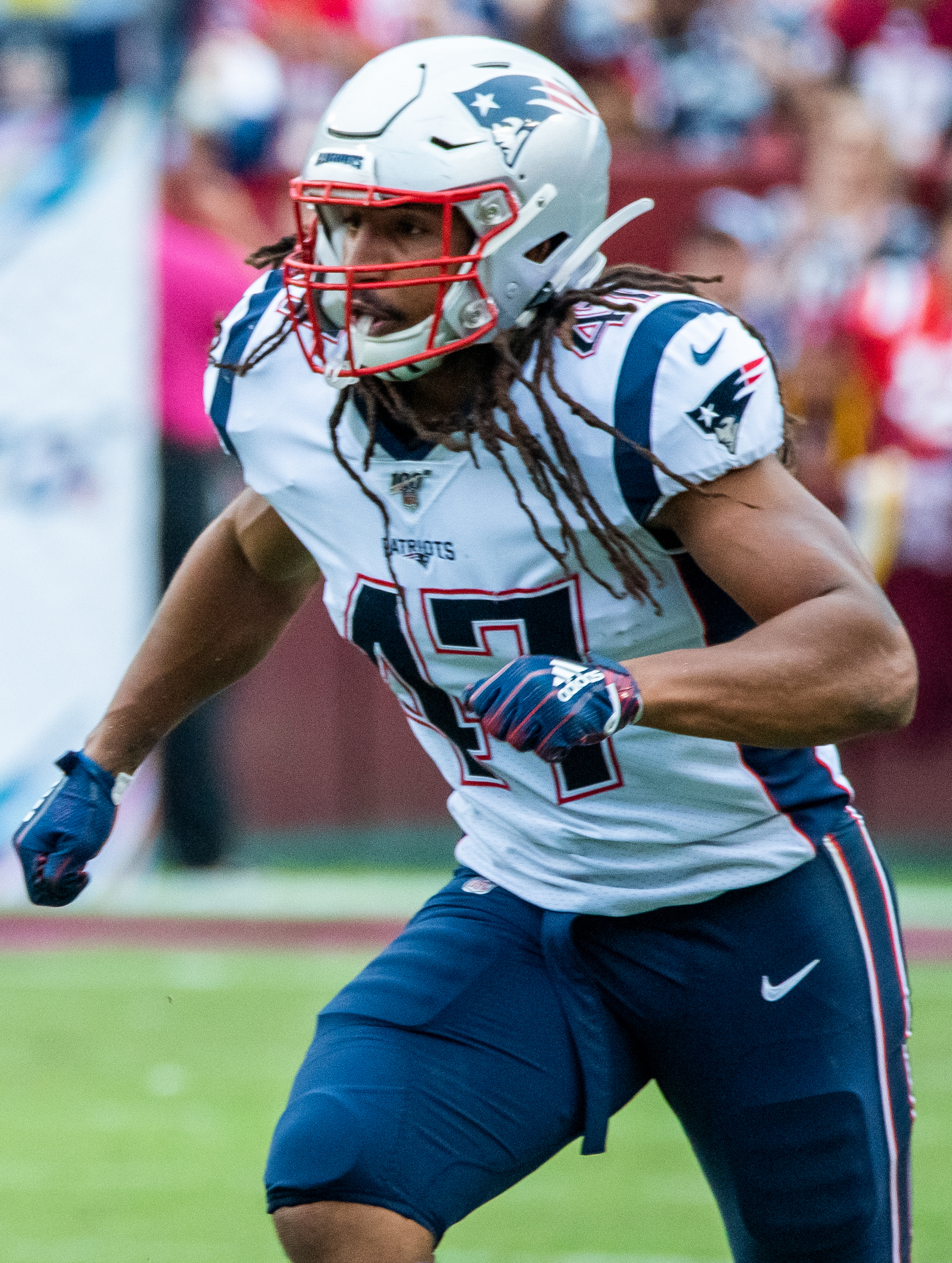
Johnson with the New England Patriots in 2019

Jakob entered the NFL via the International Player Pathway Program and was signed by New England Patriots as an undrafted free agent on 8 April 2019. He was released during final roster cuts on 31 August. After remaining unclaimed in waivers, he was automatically assigned to the Patriots' practice squad for the 2019 season. As the Patriots chose not to register him as an international player, Johnson counted against the 10-man practice squad limit, and was therefore eligible to be signed to the active roster during the 2019 season. He was promoted from the practice squad on 21 September following an injury to James Develin and became the first International Pathway player to be activated and play in an NFL game. He was placed on season-ending injured reserve on 14 October with a shoulder injury. In the 2019 season, he recorded one reception for five yards, and took 94 total snaps — 71 on offense and 23 on special teams — in 4 games played.

To start the 2020 NFL season, his second, Johnson made the Patriots 53-man roster out of camp, becoming the second International Pathway player to do so after Efe Obada. In Week 2 of the 2020 season against the Seattle Seahawks on Sunday Night Football, Johnson scored his first NFL touchdown on a one-yard touchdown reception from Cam Newton, becoming the first player from the International Player Pathway to score a touchdown. He also became the first offensive player from Germany and second overall German player to score a touchdown. He appeared in all 16 games and started 11 in the 2020 season.

On 25 March 2021, the Patriots re-signed Johnson to a one-year contract. He appeared in all 17 regular season games (started six) and the Patriots' playoff game against Buffalo.

=== Las Vegas Raiders ===
Johnson signed with the Las Vegas Raiders on 17 March 2022. In the 2022 season, he appeared in all 17 games and started nine for the Raiders. He contributed on offense and special teams.

Johnson signed a one-year contract extension on 15 March 2023. Johnson was released by the Raiders on 17 November and re-signed to the practice squad four days later. He was signed to the active roster on 29 December. During the regular season, Johnson appeared in 13 games and started five. He split time on offense and special teams.

=== New York Giants ===
On August 16, 2024, Johnson signed with the New York Giants. He was released on August 27, and re-signed to the practice squad. He was released on September 6, but re-signed to the active roster a few days later. Joshson was released again on September 24 and re-signed back to the practice squad. He was released again from the practice squad on November 19.

=== Houston Texans ===
On March 18, 2025, Johnson signed with the Houston Texans. He has a one-year contract with a base salary of $1.04 million, expandable with bonuses up to $1.17 million. He was released on August 26 as part of final roster cuts, and re-signed to the practice squad. On September 7, Johnson was elevated to the active roster for a Week 1 game against the Los Angeles Rams, and was elevated again on September 14, where he recorded a blocked punt while playing on special teams. On September 20, he was signed to the active roster. Johnson was placed on injured reserve on September 26, having suffered a hamstring injury in Week 3 against the Jacksonville Jaguars. He was activated on November 15, ahead of the team's Week 11 matchup against the Tennessee Titans. Johnson was waived by Houston on December 8 and re-signed to the practice squad two days later.

== NFL career statistics ==
Legend
**Bold**	Career high

=== Regular season ===
Year	Team	Games		Receiving					Fumbles	
Year	Team	GP	GS	Rec	Yds	Y/R	Lng	TD	Fum	Lost
2019	NE	4	3	1	5	5.0	5	0	0	0
2020	NE	16	11	**8**	35	4.4	12	**1**	**1**	0
2021	NE	17	6	4	**43**	10.8	**29**	0	0	0
2022	LV	17	9	5	10	2.0	5	0	0	0
2023	LV	13	5	1	12	**12.0**	12	0	0	0
2024	NYG	3	1	0	0	0.0	0	0	0	0
2025	HOU	7	2	0	0	0.0	0	0	0	0
Career		77	37	19	105	5.5	29	1	1	0

== Business career ==
In February 2022, Johnson publicly announced his investment in the American football club Stuttgart Surge and he is now a co-owner.
