= Barcelona Dragons (ELF) =

Defunct American football team in Spain

Logo

General information
- Founded: December 2020; 5 years ago
- Folded: 4 December 2024; 18 months ago
- Stadium: Estadi Municipal de Reus (2021−2022); Estadi Olímpic de Terrassa (2023); Estadi Municipal de Badalona (2024)
- Headquartered: Barcelona, Catalonia, Spain
- Colors: Dark green, red, yellow
- Website: www.bcn-dragons.com

League / conference affiliations
- European League of Football (ELF); Central Conference

The Barcelona Dragons were an American football team based in Catalonia, Spain. It played in the European League of Football (ELF).

== History ==
On 11 January 2021, it was announced that a new franchise in Barcelona would be one of the eight teams to play in the inaugural season of the European League of Football. The name chosen for the franchise was Gladiators Football, and the team would be coached by long-time CFL coach Adam Rita After the league was announced in March 2021, an agreement was reached with the NFL to reuse NFL Europe team names, and the franchise was renamed the Barcelona Dragons.

On June 19, 2021, the Dragons played their first game and lost to the Stuttgart Surge at home, 17–21. After four defeats, the first victory against the Berlin Thunder was achieved on week 6, 48–16. Wide receiver Jéan Constant was awarded gameday MVP honors. On week 8, quarterback Zach Edwards won the award for best player of the week. After a defeat on week 11, the team missed entry into the play-offs. The Dragons finished the season with a record of three wins and seven losses.

In March 2022, the Dragons hired Andrew Weidinger as head coach and offensive coordinator for the 2022 season. Weidinger previously was an assistant coach with the Atlanta Falcons and the Tampa Bay Buccaneers from 2008 to 2018. With Weidinger, the Dragons won the Southern Conference. They lost to the Vienna Vikings in the semifinal.

In April 2022, the Dragons founded the youth project European Football Academy, later renamed the Dragons Academy. In September 2022, the Dragons Academy and the L'Hospitalet Pioneers started a joint team called Dragons Academy Pioneers in the national junior league, Liga Nacional Junior.

In May 2023, the Dragons announced the entry of Elite Sports Equity, which bought 60% of the shares of Big Ten Football SL. The investor group included technology entrepreneur Jason Robinson, Super Bowl XLVIII MVP Malcolm Smith, investor Marcelia Freeman, and former professional golfer Martin Roache. The Dragons moved to the stadium Olimpic de Terrassa, about 100 km closer to Barcelona than Reus, their previous home.

The franchise released coach Weidinger right after the 2022 season. His successor was former defensive coordinator Gabriel "Black" Sánchez. The team started the 2023 season with two wins. New quarterback Conor Miller was named MVP of the Week on matchday 2. After that, the Dragons could not win a single game. The last game in Munich was lost with 0:55. After the season, general manager Bart Iaccarino resigned from his post. The Dragons also parted ways with head coach Gabriel Sánchez.

The new head coach for the 2024 season was David Shelton. His son Dominique Shelton, who played for the Raiders Tirol and Berlin Thunder in 2022, was brought on to the team as a player. For quarterback, the Dragons signed Levi Lewis, who was on the Seattle Seahawks in 2022. In March 2024, the Estadi Municipal de Badalona was introduced as the team's new venue.

One day before the game in week 7, the Dragons fired coach Shelton. Except for three coaches, the rest of the coaching staff resigned, and 23 out of 53 players refused to play. With a halftime score of 0-54 in favor of the Munich Ravens, the Dragons decided to cancel the rest of the game. The Spaniard Óscar Calatayud took over as head coach. The Dragons lost all of its remaining games, including a 0–90 blowout in Munich.

On December 4, 2024, the team published a statement that they were working on a continuation of game operations. However, on the same day, the league announced that the Dragons would drop out of the ELF.

=== Season-by-season ===
Season	Head coach	Regular season					Postseason				Result	Ø Attendance
Season	Head coach	GP	Won	Lost	Win %	Finish	GP	Won	Lost	Win %	Result	Ø Attendance
2021	Adam Rita	10	3	7	.300	3rd (South)	DNQ					1,163
2022	Andrew Weidinger	12	8	4	.750	1st (Southern)	1	0	1	.000	—	1,025
2023	Gabriel Sánchez	12	2	10	.167	5th (Central)	DNQ					1,081
2024	David Shelton; Óscar Calatayud	12	2	10	.167	5th (Central)	DNQ					921

== Stadium ==
The Dragons were playing their 2024 home games in Badalona, near the city center of Barcelona.
