= Frankfurt Galaxy (ELF) =

American football team in Frankfurt

- Current season
- Logo
- Uniforms

General information
- Founded: 2021
- Headquartered: Frankfurt, Germany
- Colors: Purple, orange, black
- Mascot: Franky (purple dinosaur)

Personnel
- Head coach: Thomas Kösling

Nickname
- FGY

Team history
- Frankfurt Galaxy (2021–present)

Home fields
- PSD Bank Arena (2021–present)

League / conference affiliations
- European Football Alliance (since 2026); European League of Football (2021–2025)

Championships
- League championships: 1 ELF 2021
- Division championships: 1 ELF South: 2021

Playoff appearances (2)
- ELF 2021, 2023

The Frankfurt Galaxy is a professional American football team in Frankfurt, Germany, that competes in the European Football Alliance (EFA). They played in the European League of Football (ELF) from 2021 to 2025, and won the ELF championship in 2021.

== History ==
=== European League of Football (2021–2025) ===
The Frankfurt franchise was announced in November 2020, as part of the inaugural season of the European League of Football. In March 2021, ELF announced it has reached an agreement with the NFL, to be able to use the team names from the days of NFL Europe. On the same day, it was announced Frankfurt will use the previous name of Frankfurt Galaxy.

The Frankfurt Galaxy would finish their inaugural season with a 9-1 record, defeating the Cologne Centurions in the South Division Finals 36-6 to secure a spot in the first ELF Championship Game. In a spiritual rematch of the final game in NFL Europe history, the Galaxy defeated the Hamburg Sea Devils 32-30 to win their first league championship. Galaxy quarterback Jakeb Sullivan was named 2021 Offensive Player of the Year, with running back Gerald Ameln winning Offensive Rookie of the Year, and Thomas Kösling earning Coach of the Year honors.

=== European Football Alliance (2026–present) ===
Following the conclusion of the 2025 season, the eleven member franchises of the European Football Alliance confirmed that they would leaving the European League of Football to start a new competition in 2026, with the Frankfurt Galaxy among the teams confirmed for the new league. The Galaxy would host the first-ever EFA game at PSD Bank Arena on 15 May 2026, losing to the Paris Musketeers 21-20. The Galaxy would finish the 2026 EFA season with a 4-6 record, qualifying for the BIG4 Playoffs as the fourth seed. In the first playoff game in EFA history, Frankfurt lost to the Munich Ravens 52-33.

== Season-by-season ==
| Season | Division | Head coach | Regular season | | | | | Postseason | | | | Result | Ø Attendance |
| Season | Division | Head coach | GP | Won | Lost | Win % | Finish | GP | Won | Lost | Win % | Result | Ø Attendance |
|---|---|---|---|---|---|---|---|---|---|---|---|---|---|
| 2021 | ELF South | Thomas Kösling | 10 | 9 | 1 | .900 | 1st | 2 | 2 | 0 | 1.000 | Championship game winners | 2,100 |
| 2022 | ELF Central | Thomas Kösling | 12 | 8 | 4 | .667 | 3rd | DNQ | | | | | 5,008 |
| 2023 | ELF Western | Thomas Kösling | 12 | 10 | 2 | .800 | 2nd | 2 | 1 | 1 | .500 | Semifinal loss at Rhein Fire | 6,437 |
| 2024 | ELF Western | Thomas Kösling | 12 | 4 | 8 | .333 | 5th | DNQ | | | | | 7,098 |
| 2025 | ELF West | Bart Andrus | 12 | 6 | 6 | .500 | 3rd | DNQ | | | | | 7,251 |
| 2026 | EFA | Thomas Kösling | 10 | 4 | 6 | .400 | 4th | 1 | 0 | 1 | .000 | Semifinal loss to Munich Ravens | |
| Total | | | 68 | 41 | 27 | .603 | | 5 | 3 | 2 | .600 | | 5,634 |

== Honours ==
Team

- European League of Football – Championship game
  - Winners: 2021
- European League of Football – Southern Division
  - Champions: 2021

Players

| Honor | Player Name | Season |
|---|---|---|
| ELF Offensive Player of the Year | Jakeb Sullivan | 2021 |
| ELF Offensive Rookie of the Year | Gerald Ameln | 2021 |
| ELF Man of the Year | Thang Le Minh | 2023 |

Coaches

| Honor | Player Name | Season |
|---|---|---|
| ELF Coach of the Year | Thomas Kösling | 2021 |

== Logo ==
The logo is an updated version of the original Frankfurt Galaxy logo, represents a galaxy. The team colors were purple, metallic gold, and black through the 2024 season. Ahead of the 2025 ELF season, the Galaxy updated their color scheme, replacing the gold with orange to better match their NFL Europe predecessors.

== Stadium ==
The Galaxy are playing their home games at the PSD Bank Arena.
