= Gazi-Stadion auf der Waldau =

Stadium in Stuttgart

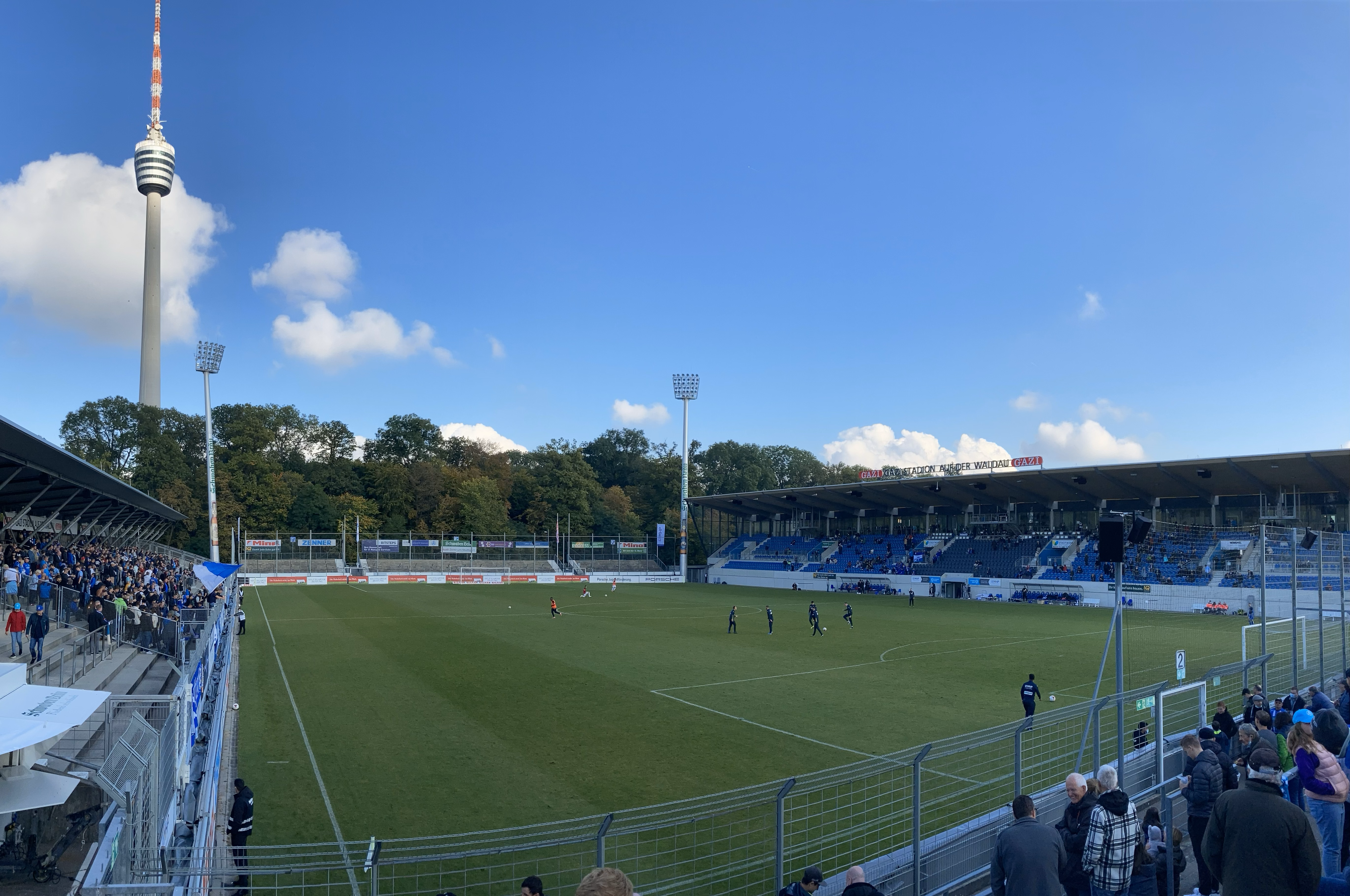
- View with the Fernsehturm Stuttgart
- Interactive map of Gazi-Stadion auf der Waldau
- Location: Guts-Muths Weg 4; 70597 Stuttgart; Germany
- Coordinates: 48°45′14.2″N 9°11′18.3″E
- Owner: City of Stuttgart
- Operator: City of Stuttgart
- Capacity: 11,410 (Total); 10,099 (Standing) + 1,311 (Seats)
- Surface: Grass

Construction
- Built: 1905: Kickers-Stadion (1905–1987)
- Opened: 18 June 1905
- Renovated: 1913, 1975, 1982, 1997, 2000, 2009

Tenants
- Stuttgarter Kickers, Stuttgart Scorpions, Stuttgart Surge

The Waldau-Stadion, known as the Gazi-Stadion auf der Waldau for sponsorship purposes, is a multi-use stadium in the Degerloch district in Stuttgart, Germany. The stadium is situated approximately 200m southwest of the Fernsehturm Stuttgart and holds 11,410 spectators (of these, 1,068 canopied seats and 4,949 canopied stands), which makes it the second biggest stadium in Stuttgart. It is home to the Stuttgarter Kickers, as of 2024 playing in the Regionalliga Südwest. The American football teams Stuttgart Scorpions and Stuttgart Surge use the stadium in the German Football League and European League of Football, respectively.

The Waldau-Stadion is the oldest stadium in Germany.

== History ==
The football section of Stuttgarter Kickers plays their home games in the stadium since its inauguration in 1905, thereby being the German club that plays for the longest time in the same stadium.

Until 1975, the stadium featured a wooden terrace that was built after one of Arsenal's in scale 1–3. Due to various requirements imposed by the German Football Association, a new main stand was built in 1976 and is in use until today. After having the names Kickers-Platz and Kickers-Stadium since 1905, the stadium was officially renamed to Waldau-Stadion in 1987.

The Stuttgart Scorpions, founded in 1982 and playing in 1st or 2nd level leagues since, used the stadium on occasions, or nearby fields. In 1991, they hosted an Allstar Bowl Game against college players under Ex-NFL-Coach Sam Rutigliano. Scorpions use the stadium since their return to the German Football League in 1995.

In 2001, the MTV HipHop Open took place in the stadium. This was the only occurrence of the music festival in the stadium as it moved to the Reitstadion in the next year and has been moved to Mannheim since 2009.

In June 2004 the name of the stadium was sold to the German main sponsor Garmo AG for 10 years. Garmo sells its products with the brand name GAZi and renamed the stadium accordingly to GAZi-Stadion auf der Waldau.

On 6 October 2007, the final of the German Bowl, the German championship in American Football, between the Stuttgart Scorpions and the Braunschweig Lions took place in the GAZi-Stadion. Braunschweig won the championship for the third time in a row, defeating Stuttgart 27–6 in front of 8,152 spectators.

On 17 July 2008, Stuttgart's council decided to remodel the stadium for 5.4 million Euro in order to fulfill the requirements imposed by the DFB for the new 3. Liga. It was planned to increase the capacity to 12,000 spectators (2,000 canopied seats and 10.000 stands in total). Beginning of the construction work was planned for January 2009 and should be finished by July 2009. In the end of 2008, however, the council decided to postpone the remodeling for an unknown time span. Following the relegation of Stuttgarter Kickers to the fourth-tier Regionalliga Süd, the remodeling would not have been necessary.

== See also ==
- List of football stadiums in Germany
- Lists of stadiums
