= Estadi Municipal de Reus =

Stadium in Reus, Catalonia

Estadi Municipal
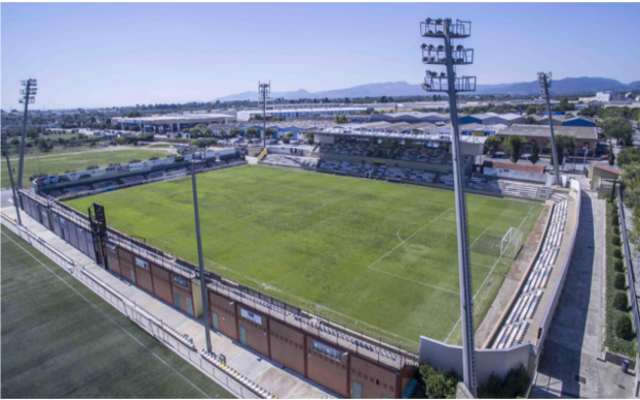
- Interactive map of Estadi Municipal
- Full name: Estadi Municipal de Reus
- Former names: Camp Nou (1977–1984); Camp Nou Municipal (1984–2005)
- Location: Reus, Spain
- Coordinates: 41°9′23″N 1°5′8″E
- Owner: Reus City Council
- Operator: Reus Esport i Lleure SA
- Capacity: 4,700
- Surface: Grass
- Field size: 105x75m

Construction
- Opened: October 1977; 49 years ago

Tenants
- CF Reus Deportiu (1977–2020); Barcelona Dragons (2021–2022); Reus FC Reddis (2022–)

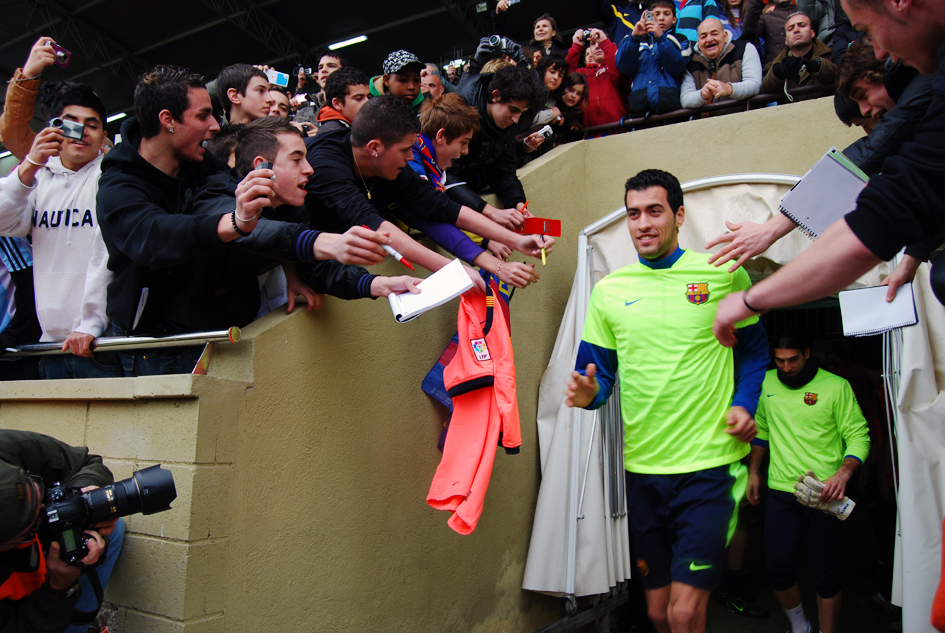
FC Barcelona at the stadium in the centenary of Reus Deportiu

The Estadi Municipal de Reus, also known as Estadi Camp Nou Municipal, is a multi-use stadium located in Reus, Catalonia, Spain. It is currently used for football matches and home games of the Reus FC Reddis. It was the previous home stadium of CF Reus Deportiu until 2020.

== History ==
Estadi Municipal was opened in October 1977 with the name of Camp Nou, being the new home stadium of CF Reus Deportiu and replacing Calle de Gaudí. Aside from the football stadium, the space also contains a rugby field and a multi-sport field.

On 26 May 2016, the Ajuntament of Reus announced a renovation to the stadium and its surroundings, including an adaptation to meet the LFP criteria.

In June 2018, the stadium hosted matches of the 2018 Mediterranean Games football tournament.

Beginning with the inaugural season of the new European League of Football the Barcelona Dragons played all their home games at the stadium. Furthermore, the management came to an agreement with the municipality Reus to use their stadion for the 2022 and 2023 season.

From 2022–23 season, Reus FC Reddis will play in Estadi Municipal due to Dissolved club, CF Reus Deportiu for home matches until 2020.
