= Alfred-Kunze-Sportpark =

Stadium in Leipzig

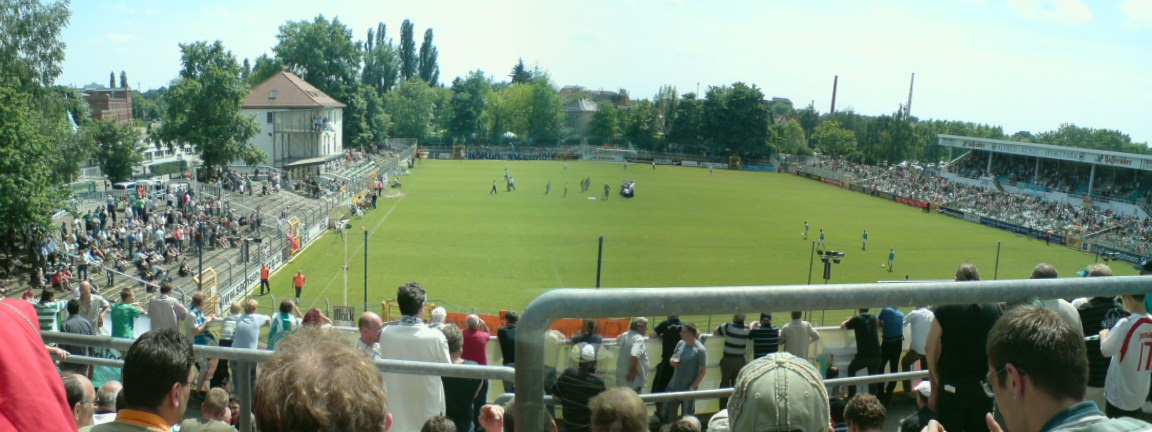
- Interactive map of Alfred-Kunze-Sportpark
- Full name: Alfred-Kunze-Sportpark
- Former names: Georg-Schwarz-Sportpark (1949–1992 and 2018)
- Location: Am Sportpark 2, D-04179 Leipzig, Germany
- Coordinates: 51°21′29″N 12°18′28″E
- Capacity: 20,000 (original); 4,999 (current)

Construction
- Opened: 1915

Tenants
- BSG Chemie Leipzig (2011–present); TuRa Leipzig (1939–1945); SG Leipzig-Leutzsch (1946–1949); ZSG Industrie Leipzig (1946–1950); BSG Chemie Leipzig (1950–1990); FC Sachsen Leipzig (1990–2004, 2011); SG Sachsen Leipzig (2011–2014); Leipzig Kings (ELF) (2021)

Alfred-Kunze-Sportpark is a multi-use stadium in Leipzig, Germany. It is used as the stadium of BSG Chemie Leipzig matches. The capacity of the stadium is 4,999 spectators.

For the inaugural season of the new European League of Football the Leipzig Kings played their home games at the stadium. They had to move out for the 2022 season due to noise regulations.
