= BBBank Arena =

Multi-use stadium in Frankfurt am Main, Hesse, Germany

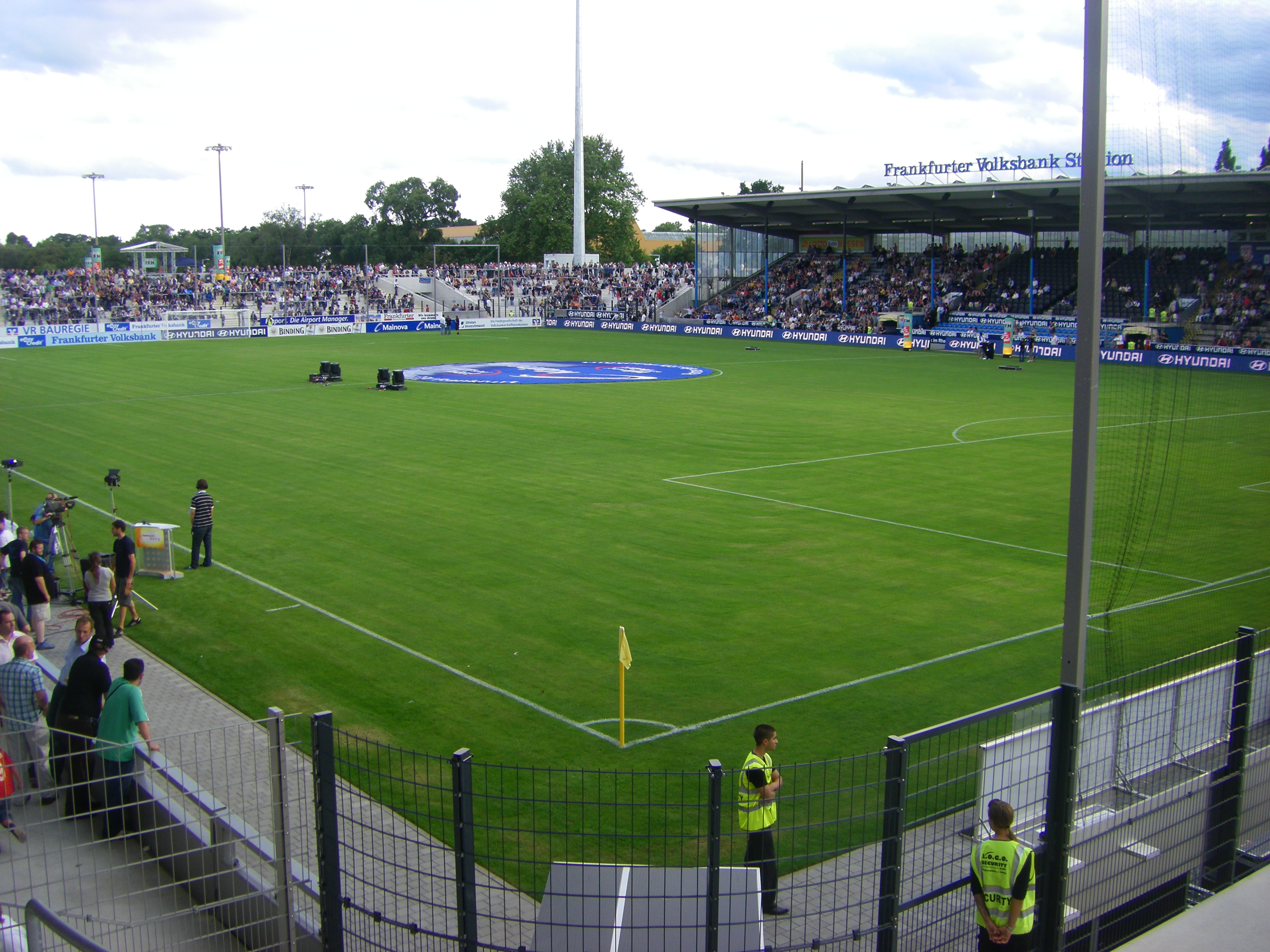
- Stadion am Bornheimer Hang in July 2009
- Interactive map of BBBank Arena
- Full name: BBBank Arena
- Former names: Stadion am Bornheimer Hang Frankfurter Volksbank Stadion (2006–2017) PSD Bank Arena (2018–2026)
- Address: Richard-Herrmann-Platz 1 60386 Frankfurt am Main
- Location: Frankfurt am Main, Germany
- Coordinates: 50°7′41″N 8°43′24″E
- Capacity: 12,542
- Public transit: Johanna-Tesch-Platz or Eissporthalle/Festplatz

Construction
- Opened: 11 October 1931

Tenants
- FSV Frankfurt; Frankfurt Universe (2015–2022); Frankfurt Galaxy (ELF) (2021–present)

The BBBank Arena (still commonly referred to by its original name Stadion am Bornheimer Hang) is a multi-use stadium in Bornheim, a district of Frankfurt am Main, Germany. It is currently used mostly for association football and American football matches and is the home stadium of FSV Frankfurt and Frankfurt Galaxy (ELF). Other clubs such as Eintracht Frankfurt use it occasionally. With its capacity of 12.542 it is the second largest venue in the city of Frankfurt am Main.

The inaugurational game was played on 11 October 1931, when FSV Frankfurt defeated VfL Germania 1894, 3–0.

Since 2015 the stadium is also used by the Frankfurt Universe, an American football team playing in the German Football League.

The stadium was host to the Kosovo national football team's first fully recognised international; a 2–0 win over the Faroe Islands on 3 June 2016.

On 24 March 2023, the stadium hosted the Under 21 friendly between Germany and Japan. It ended 2–2.

The stadium is best accessed by the Johanna-Tesch-Platz U-Bahn station (Note: Located in the neighboring district Riederwald), or the Eissporthalle/Festplatz station.

== See also ==
- List of football stadiums in Germany
- Lists of stadiums
