= 2023 Hamburg Sea Devils season =

American football team in Germany

2023 Hamburg Sea Devils (ELF) season
- General manager: Max Paatz
- Head coach: Charles "Yogi" Jones
- Home stadium: Stadion Hoheluft

Uniform
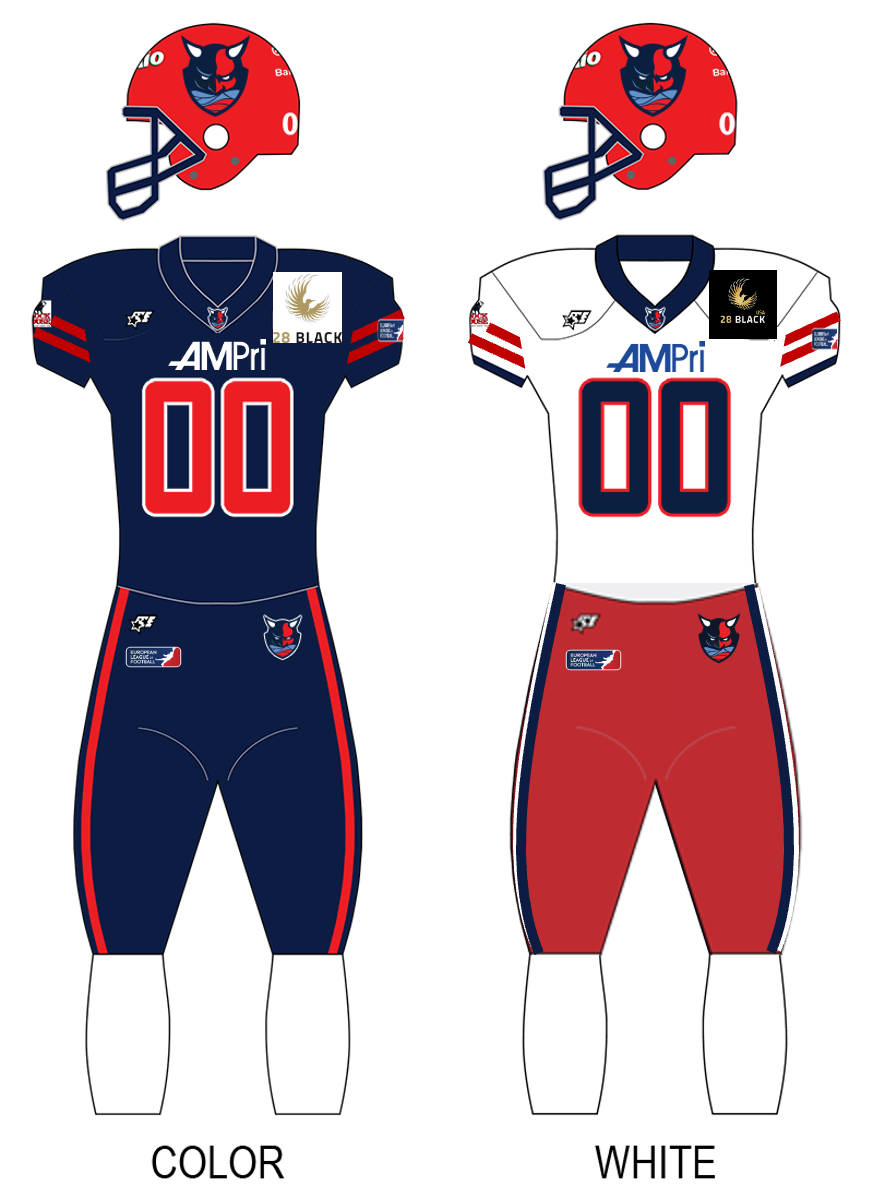

The 2022 Hamburg Sea Devils season is going to be the second season of the Hamburg Sea Devils team in the European League of Football, the second season with head coach Charles "Yogi" Jones and the first in the new Western Conference, having no games against the rivals Leipzig Kings and Panthers Wrocław. The Sea Devils are looking for the league title after two seasons reaching the championship game without a win.

== Preseason ==
Shortly after the loss in the Championship Game 2022, the two defensive cornerstones Miguel Book and Kasim Edebali left the organization. Other defensive and offensive talent left the franchise to other teams in the ELF or to the Orlando Guardians of the resurrected XFL. The first big signing of the new season came with Preston Haire, OBU Bison Quarterback and participant of the New Orleans Saints minicamp.

== Regular season ==
=== Standings ===
Western Conference
Pos	Team	GP	W	L	CONF	PF	PA	DIFF	STK	Qualification
1	(Germany) Rhein Fire	12	12	0	8–0	540	199	+341	W12	Automatic playoffs (#1)
2	(Germany) Frankfurt Galaxy	12	10	2	6–2	382	233	+149	L1	Advance to playoffs (#4)
3	(France) Paris Musketeers	12	6	6	4–4	320	277	+43	W4	
4	(Germany) Hamburg Sea Devils	12	4	8	2–6	247	278	–31	L4	
5	(Germany) Cologne Centurions	12	4	8	0–8	186	330	–144	L1	

Source: europeanleague.football

== Roster ==
Hamburg Sea Devils (ELF) roster
Quarterbacks: 1 Salieu Ceesay (Germany); Preston Haire (United States); 4 Moritz Maack (Germany); Running backs: Lucas Harting Candido (Germany); 5 Simon Ajuwon Homadi (Germany); Jakob Michaelsen (Denmark); Wide receivers: 13 Tim Albrecht (Germany); Finn Appelt (Germany); 12 Johann Heuck (Germany); 10 Jean-Claude Madin Cerezo (Spain); 11 Benjamin Mau (Germany); Keanu Morgan (Germany); 89 Lukas Rehder (Germany); Clemens Schuldt (Germany); Malik Stanley (United States); Tight ends: Malcom Abimbola (Germany); Finn Jaster (Germany); Niklas Kahrau QB (Germany)	Offensive linemen: 70 Shalom Baafi (Germany); Gerrit Brandt (Germany); Daniel Claus (Germany); 51 Gian De Guzman (Philippines); 77 Robin Fensch (Germany); 74 Dennis Kenzler (Germany); Lukas Lavin (Sweden); Marvin Panienka (Germany); 65 Ron Mac Spiegel (Germany); 72 Niklas Wiem (Germany); 69 David Weinstock (Germany); Defensive linemen: 98 Hiswill Awuah DT (Germany); 99 Nelson Imasuen DE (Canada); 94 Berend Grube DE (Germany); Moritz Hiendleder (New Zealand); Joshua Köhnlein (Germany); Manuel Raskopp (Germany); 95 Evans Yeboah DT (Ghana)	Linebackers: Kubindia Bashale (Germany); Mattis Dölling (Germany); Tim Kroll (Germany); Emmanuel Kwakye (Germany); Robert Lachmann (Germany); 54 Thiago Lessow OLB (Germany); 58 Brian-Tom Lohse OLB (Germany); 52 Ambroise Mati OLB (Germany); Jan-Niklas Makoben (Germany); 45 Jeremy Sarfo RB (Germany); 40 Matthias Spiegel ILB (Germany); Maurice Wright Jr. (United States); Defensive backs: 15 Kevin Fortes (France); Deion Harris (United States); Marvin Omar Gesellnsetter (Germany); Victor Omorodion (Germany); Gian-Luca Poerschke (Germany); Bjarne Sauer (Germany); Karm Singh García Heermann (Germany); Special teams: 8 Eric Schlomm K/P (Germany)	Rookies in italics Roster updated 23 March 2023; 4 A-import, 4 E-import, 48 homegrown 56 active

== Staff ==
Hamburg Sea Devils (ELF) staff
Front office: CEO – Zeljko Karajica; General Manager – Max Paatz; Director player personnel – Kendral Ellison; Head coach: Head coach – Charles "Yogi" Jones; Assistant head coach – Kendral Ellison; Offensive coaches: Offensive coordinator – Brett Morgan; Offensive assistant – Devin Pettenger; Quarterbacks – n/a; Wide receivers – Philipp Schulz; Tight ends – Marico Gregersen; Running backs – Sören Hauff; Offensive line – Gustavo Casagrande; Assistant offensive line – Ron Masnytzia; Offensive quality control – Patrik Asen	Defensive coaches: Defensive coordinator – Kendral Ellison; Linebackers – Tevin Hanley; Defensive line – Malik Ademote; Assistant defensive coach – Moses Sarawry; Defensive backs – Kenneth Flanders; Special teams coaches: Special teams coordinator – Florian Voss; Kicking coach – Stefan Nickel; Strength and conditioning: Head strength and conditioning – n/a; Staff updated 14 February 2022
