= 2021 in American football =

This article is about the 2021 calendar year in American football.

== College football ==
- August 28: The 2021 season of highest level of college football in the United States, NCAA Division I Football Bowl Subdivision (formerly known as Division I-A) began. the regular season ended on December 11, and the postseason began on December 17.

== National Football League ==
- February 7: The NFL's Super Bowl LV in Tampa. Tampa Bay Buccaneers defeated the Kansas City Chiefs 31–9.
- September 9: The start of the 102nd season of the National Football League, with defending Super Bowl LV champion Tampa Bay defeating Dallas in the NFL Kickoff Game. It is the first to feature a 17-game regular season schedule, which ended on January 9, 2022.

== XFL ==
Due to the COVID-19 pandemic, the XFL cancelled its 2021 season with plans to return in spring 2022.

== European League of Football ==
European League of Football- paneuropean league, continuation of NFL Europe, hold it first season. Frankfurt Galaxy win at Merkur Spiel-Arena in Düsseldorf in final Hamburg Sea Devils 32:30. In ELF All Star Game in Berlin: ELF All Stars defeated United States men's national American football team 26:8.
