= Jakeb Sullivan =

American football player (born 1994)

No. 7 – Berlin Thunder
- Position: Quarterback
- Roster status: Active

Personal information
- Born: July 1, 1994 (age 32); Rapid City, South Dakota
- Listed height: 6 ft 1 in (1.85 m)
- Listed weight: 194 lb (88 kg)

Career information
- High school: Rapid City (SD) St. Thomas More
- College: South Dakota Mines
- NFL draft: 2018: undrafted

Career history
- Marburg Mercenaries (2019); Vienna Vikings (2020)*; Frankfurt Galaxy (2021–2023); Berlin Thunder (2024–present)
- * Offseason or practice squad member only

Awards and highlights
- ELF champion (2021); ELF Bowl MVP (2021); ELF Offensive Player of the Year (2021)

Jakeb Jon Wayne Sullivan (born July 1, 1994) is an American football quarterback for the Berlin Thunder in the European League of Football. He played college football for the South Dakota Mines Hardrockers, a Division II program in Rapid City, South Dakota.

== Early life and college career ==
Sullivan attended St. Thomas More High School in Rapid City, South Dakota, where he played quarterback for the football team. He was team captain and team MVP, and was named to the All-State and Academic All-State teams.

Sullivan joined the South Dakota Mines Hardrockers program in NCAA Division II, where he became the starting quarterback. In his four years at SDSM&T he set 17 new school records, 2 All-RMCS best quarterback and Don Hansen All-American Team. With 325.1 yards per game, he led the entire NCAA Division II. In total he completed 293 passes for 3,576 yards, 32 passing touchdowns and 10 rushing touchdowns.

=== College statistics ===
Year	Team	GP	Passing							Rushing			
Year	Team	GP	Cmp	Att	Pct	Yds	Y/A	TD	Int	Att	Yds	Avg	TD
2015	South Dakota Mines	11	123	198	62,1 %	1.345	6,8	6	6	61	195	3,2	2
2016	South Dakota Mines	9	154	234	65,8 %	1.897	8,1	19	8	90	478	5,3	8
2017	South Dakota Mines	10	187	368	50,8 %	2.398	6,5	18	15	143	598	4,2	10
2018	South Dakota Mines	11	293	461	63,5 %	3.576	7,8	32	14	129	340	2,6	10
College total		41	757	1.261	60,0 %	9.216	7,3	75	43	423	1611	3,8	30
Source: gorockers.com

== Professional career ==
=== German Football League ===
In December 2018, Sullivan signed with the Marburg Mercenaries ahead of the 2019 German Football League season. In his first year as an import player he reached several milestones. After nine victories out of 14 games his team qualified for the play-offs, where they lost in the quarterfinals against the Dresden Monarchs. He was nominated in the GFL Allstar Team as the statistical passing leader of this season. He threw for 46 passing touchdowns and ran for 14 rushing touchdowns. In October 2019 he was signed by the Vienna Vikings in the Austrian Football League. He did not start due to the COVID-19 pandemic.

=== European League of Football ===
In the inaugural 2021 European League of Football season Sullivan was signed by the Frankfurt Galaxy and head coach Thomas Kösling. In the regular season Sullivan had the highest passing completion rate (66,2 %) of the league as well as 2,037 passing yards and 23 touchdowns. With a passer rating of 105.96 he was the second best quarterback in the regular season. In the Divisional Championship playoff-game against the Cologne Centurions he scored five passing touchdowns with four different target and was nominated MVP of this game. In the first ELF Championship game the Frankfurt Galaxy won against the Hamburg Sea Devils with a dramatic 32:30 score. He was nominated ELF Championship game-MVP, voted to the ELF Allstar game and won the Offensive Player of the Year award. The Frankfurt Galaxy announced in mid November the extension for another season. Sullivan was released by the Galaxy on November 7, 2023.

On December 14, 2023, Sullivan signed with the Berlin Thunder of the European League of Football.

=== Professional statistics ===
Year	Team	GP	Passing								Rushing			
Year	Team	GP	Cmp	Att	Pct	Yds	Y/A	TD	Int	Rtg	Att	Yds	Avg	TD
German Football League
2019	Marburg Mercenaries	15	431	609	70.8%	4,747	7.8	46	18	106.4	176	540	3.1	14
GFL total		15	431	609	70.8 %	4,747	7.8	46	18	106.4	176	540	3.1	14
European League of Football
2021	Frankfurt Galaxy	11	211	318	66.4%	2,609	8.2	32	8	114.6	54	191	3.5	6
2022	Frankfurt Galaxy	11	246	371	66.3%	2,930	11.91	31	7	110.2	74	313	4.23	5
ELF total		22	457	689	66.35	5,539	10.34	63	15	112.3	128	504	3.97	11
Source: stats.gfl.info

== Private life ==
Sullivan has four younger siblings and is Native American, a member of the Cheyenne River Lakota Sioux. His father was football coach at St. Thomas More High School. He majored in industrial engineering and was nominated for the Allstate AFCA Good Works Team.
