= 2023 Frankfurt Galaxy season =

- General manager: Jörg Ziesche
- Head coach: (Germany) Thomas Kösling
- Home stadium: PSD Bank Arena

Results
- Record: 10-2
- Conference place: 2nd (Western)
- Playoffs: Wild card win 20-3 vs Berlin Thunder; Semi final loss 23-42 at Rhein Fire

Uniform

The 2023 Frankfurt Galaxy season is the third season of the new Frankfurt Galaxy team in the European League of Football. In the 2023 season the Galaxy played in the Western Conference, finishing the regular season with a 10-2 record and reaching the playoffs.

== Preseason ==
The 2021 champion announced the resigning of starting quarterback Jakeb Sullivan. Shortly after, the franchise re-signed local talent Lorenz Regler for the 2023 season.

== Regular season ==
=== Standings ===
Western Conference
Pos	Team	GP	W	L	CONF	PF	PA	DIFF	STK	Qualification
1	(Germany) Rhein Fire	12	12	0	8–0	540	199	+341	W12	Automatic playoffs (#1)
2	(Germany) Frankfurt Galaxy	12	10	2	6–2	382	233	+149	L1	Advance to playoffs (#4)
3	(France) Paris Musketeers	12	6	6	4–4	320	277	+43	W4	
4	(Germany) Hamburg Sea Devils	12	4	8	2–6	247	278	–31	L4	
5	(Germany) Cologne Centurions	12	4	8	0–8	186	330	–144	L1	

Source: europeanleague.football

== Roster ==
Frankfurt Galaxy roster
Quarterbacks: 10 Steven Cluley (United States); 6 Lars Heidrich (Germany); 7 Jakeb Sullivan (United States); Running backs: 27 Thomas Fischbach (Germany); 44 León Helm FB (Germany); 20 Nick Kaufman (Germany); 2 Shannon Samuel (United States); 21 Jacob Wenzel (Germany); Wide receivers: 83 Zinedin Bendjabou (Germany); 85 Markus Hachenberg (Germany); 17 Reece Horn (United States); 81 Janez von Renesse (Germany); 86 Lorenz Regler (Germany); 16 Niklas Schumm (Germany); 11 Normen Schumm (Germany); 82 Hendrik Schwarz (Germany); 19 Nico Strahmann (Germany); Tight ends: 87 Kevin Mwamba (France)	Offensive linemen: 71 Frank Atunlese (Germany); 79 Matej Bencek (Germany); 74 Sven Fischer C (Germany); 61 Lars Hampel (Germany); 62 Nils Hampel (Germany); 78 Tim Hirsch G (Germany); 77 Yannic Kiehl T (Germany); 55 Thang Le Minh (Germany); 70 Danijel Miletic G (Germany); 86 Lorenz Regler (Germany); 64 Moritz Schmidt (Germany); 81 Janez von Renesse (Germany); Defensive linemen: 90 Marc Anthony Hor DT (Germany); 98 Koku Antoine Giede DE (Germany); 95 Daniel Bartmann (Germany); 54 Karlis Brauns DE (Latvia); 91 Moubarak Djeri (Togo); 96 Taslim Gaye (Germany); 8 Mete Konya DT (Germany); 99 Kevin Maier DE (Germany); 92 Fränk Mousel (Netherlands); 97 Sven Rieger (Germany)	Linebackers: 22 Louis Achaintre ILB (France); 34 Bästlein, Cort ILB (Germany); 45 Simeon Gabriel (Germany); 41 Sebastian Gauthier (Sweden); 53 Daniel Josiah ILB (Portugal); 58 Anthony Keith Williams ILB (Germany); 57 David Koszyk (Germany); 50 David Miletic (Germany); 52 Wael Nasri ILB (France); 56 Sebastían Silva Gomez OLB (Germany); Defensive backs: 14 Joshua Poznanski S (Germany); 24 Karim Ben El Ghali CB (Germany); 32 Vincent Bujalla (Germany); 35 Marcos Schlabitz S (Germany); 4 Tony Anderson S (France); 38 Sebastian Brandt (Germany); 5 Jamalcolm Liggins CB (United States); 31 Alexander Neville (Germany); 30 Falk Reuter (Germany); 3 BerDale Robins (United States); 28 Cedric Schmitt (Germany); Special teams: 1 Ryan Rimmler K (Germany)	Rookies in italics Roster updated November 22, 2023; 5 A-import, 7 E-import, 50 homegrown 62 active

=== Transactions ===
From Raiders Tirol: Tony Anderson

== Staff ==
Frankfurt Galaxy staff
Front office: Owner – B.G.A. Football Betriebs GmbH (i.a. Christopher Knower, David Knower, Kösling, Eric Reutemann, James McGoldrick, Dr. Jörg Zirener); CEO – Christopher Knower; General manager – Jörg Ziesche; Strategy advisor – Martin Bader; Head coach: Head coach – Thomas Kösling; Offensive coaches: Offensive coordinator – Patrick Griesheimer; Quarterbacks – Conrad Schuman; Offense consulting – Peter Vaas; Running backs – n/a; Wide receivers – n/a; Tight ends – Florian Bambuch; Offensive line – n/a	Defensive coaches: Defensive coordinator – n/a; Linebacker – n/a; Defensive line – n/a; Defensive backs – n/a; Special teams coaches: Special teams coordinator – n/a; Strength and conditioning: Athletic trainer – n/a; Staff updated 14 February 2023
