= 2023 Cologne Centurions season =

American football team in Germany

2023 Cologne Centurions (ELF) season
- General manager: David Drane
- Head coach: (United States) Khalil Carter
- Home stadium: Südstadion

Uniform

The 2023 Cologne Centurions season is going to be the third season of the Cologne Centurions team in the European League of Football after a previous season with mixed results and a 3–9 standing.

== Preseason ==
The first changes for the franchise were in the coaching staff with the departure of Frank Roser as head coach. Shortly after Khalil Carter was announced as new head coach, marking him as the third head coach in the three-year history of the franchise to date.

== Regular season ==
=== Standings ===
Western Conference
Pos	Team	GP	W	L	CONF	PF	PA	DIFF	STK	Qualification
1	(Germany) Rhein Fire	12	12	0	8–0	540	199	+341	W12	Automatic playoffs (#1)
2	(Germany) Frankfurt Galaxy	12	10	2	6–2	382	233	+149	L1	Advance to playoffs (#4)
3	(France) Paris Musketeers	12	6	6	4–4	320	277	+43	W4	
4	(Germany) Hamburg Sea Devils	12	4	8	2–6	247	278	–31	L4	
5	(Germany) Cologne Centurions	12	4	8	0–8	186	330	–144	L1	

Source: europeanleague.football

== Roster ==
Cologne Centurions (ELF) roster
Quarterbacks: 7 Alexander Frisch (Germany); Daniel Smith (United States); Running backs: Gerald Ameln (Germany); 8 Dean Tanwani (Germany); Wide receivers: 14 Ramin Akhlaghi (Germany); 5 Paul Kavadia-Lenhardt (Germany); 81 Valentin Rödiger (Germany); Terryon Robinson (United States); Aril Rwantambara (Belgium); Kris Wedderburn (United Kingdom); Tight ends: 11 Noah Aarass (Germany)	Offensive linemen: Carlos Carrasco Sanz (Spain); 76 Niklas Meiworm (Germany); -- Albert Trovato (Germany); Defensive linemen: 52 Alexander Boes DT (Germany); Tim Göckus (Germany); Jai-Albert Jackson (United Kingdom); 95 Jahn Jesus Lara Perez DE (Cuba); Frederik Schneider (Germany); 97 Janek Wenke DE (Germany)	Linebackers: 30 Matthias Banjaqui OLB (Germany); Zachary Blair (United States); 44 Felix Födinger OLB (Germany); 58 Lennart Weitz OLB (Germany); 2 Tufan Yagmur ILB (Germany); Defensive backs: 29 Efekan Akgün CB (Germany); 21 Marvin Djopa (Germany); 31 Dani Lamy CB (Belgium); Dajon Owens (United States); 26 Marius Riepe CB (Germany); 22 Paul Steffen (Germany); 32 Chad Walrond S (United Kingdom)	Rookies in italics Roster updated 23 March 2022; 4 A-import, 6 E-import, 24 homegrown 34 active

=== Transactions ===
- From Istanbul Rams: Zachary Blair (November 9, 2022), Kris Wedderburn (December 13, 2022), Terryon Robinson (December 22, 2022)
- From Hamburg Sea Devils: Gerald Ameln (December 16, 2022)

== Staff ==
Cologne Centurions (ELF) staff
Front office: Owner – Hans Seger; CEO/General Manager – Tonye Spiff; Director of football – David Drane; Head coach: Head coach – Christos Lambropoulos; Offensive coaches: Offensive coordinator/quarterbacks/Wide Receivers – Christos Lambropoulos; Running backs – Glynn Mansfeld; Offensive line – Jason Tillery	Defensive coaches: Defensive coordinator – Javan Lenhardt; Defensive line – Javan Lenhardt; Defensive backs – Dave Donaldson; Special teams coaches: Special teams Coordinator – Dave Donaldson; Assistant coaches: Head of Scouting & Analytics – Steffen Sikora; updated 10 March 2023
