= 2023 Rhein Fire season =

American football team in Germany

2023 Rhein Fire (ELF) season
- General manager: Tom Aust
- Head coach: Jim Tomsula
- Home stadium: Schauinsland-Reisen-Arena

Uniform

The 2023 Rhein Fire season is the second season of the new Rhein Fire team in the European League of Football from Düsseldorf, Germany. The franchise is building upon a solid previous season, missing the play-offs slightly. For this season, the Fire will compete in the new Western Conference with its rivals Cologne Centurions and Frankfurt Galaxy.

== Preseason ==
After the 2022 post-season, the franchise announced the departure of former general manager Patricia Klemm for personal reasons and presented Tom Aust, former public relations manager of the old Rhein Fire. Another big change in the coaching staff was the hire of the former Barcelona Dragons head coach Andrew Weidinger as the new offensive coordinator.

== Regular season ==
=== Standings ===
Western Conference
Pos	Team	GP	W	L	CONF	PF	PA	DIFF	STK	Qualification
1	(Germany) Rhein Fire	12	12	0	8–0	540	199	+341	W12	Automatic playoffs (#1)
2	(Germany) Frankfurt Galaxy	12	10	2	6–2	382	233	+149	L1	Advance to playoffs (#4)
3	(France) Paris Musketeers	12	6	6	4–4	320	277	+43	W4	
4	(Germany) Hamburg Sea Devils	12	4	8	2–6	247	278	–31	L4	
5	(Germany) Cologne Centurions	12	4	8	0–8	186	330	–144	L1	

Source: europeanleague.football

== Roster ==
Rhein Fire (ELF) roster
Quarterbacks: 18 (United States) Jadrian Clark; 12 (Germany) Rohat Dagdelen; 16 (Germany) Jan Leuker; Running backs: 28 (Germany) TJ Alexander; 15 (Germany) Giacomo De Pauli; 6 (Germany) Sergej Kendus; 34 (Germany) Noah Kölling; 43 (Germany) Patrick Poetsch FB; 40 (Germany) Tobias Reglinski; 17 (United Kingdom) Glen Toonga; Wide receivers: 19 (Germany) Achim Bah; 80 (Germany) Noah Gehring; 29 (Germany) Leon Höltker; 81 (Germany) Leon Kusterer; 10 (Germany) Harlan Kwofie; 13 (Germany) Jannik Lörcks; 1 (France) Anthony Mahoungou; 84 (Belgium) Feli Manoka; 89 (Germany) Jakob Neugebauer; 84 (United States) Willie Patterson; 86 (United States) Nathaniel Robitaille; 8 (Germany) Justin Schlesinger; Tight ends: 87 (Germany) Florian Eichhorn; 83 (Germany) Christopher Mielke; 88 (Germany) Marvin Pludra; 82 (Germany) Laurin Wiegand	Offensive linemen: 77 (Germany) Sven Breidenbach T; 75 (Denmark) Joachim Christensen; 79 (Germany) Bemigho Eyimofe; 60 (Germany) Kevin Foitzik; 66 (Netherlands) Arnoud Holierhoek; 62 (Germany) Marius Mohr; 74 (Germany) Jan-Hendrik Koch; 76 (Germany) Jonathan Peppler; 78 (Germany) Yasir Raji; 68 (Germany) Nick Wiens G; 71 (Germany) Leander Wiegand; Defensive linemen: 92 (Germany) Eric Adam; 97 (Germany) Jason Chikere; 90 (Germany) Remy Feltes; 3 (Germany) Simon Gavanda; 96 (Germany) Samuel Kargel; 99 (Germany) Shamgar Owusu-Ankomah; 94 (Germany) Justus Sleiman; 93 (Germany) Julian Völker	Linebackers: 11 (Spain) Alejandro Fernández; 55 (Germany) Luis Fiedler OLB; 44 (Germany) Marius Kensy; 45 (France) Martin Pinter; 54 (Germany) Maximilian Schmidt OLB; 47 (Germany) Niels Schroedter; 26 (Germany) Lino Schröter; 31 (Germany) Flamur Simon; 42 (Germany) Brian Snoek; 41 (Germany) Alexander Sobotta ILB; Defensive backs: 5 (Germany) Benjamin Barnes; 36 (Germany) Soyfan Dardour; 38 (Germany) Marvin Djomou Djopa; 32 (Germany) Daniel Duah CB; 24 (United States) Koi Freeman; 9 (Germany) Richard Grooten S; 21 (Germany) René Hanßen; 7 (Germany) Till Janssen; 25 (Germany) Lasse Meyer CB; 22 (United States) TJ Morrison; 27 (Germany) Max Richter; 4 (Germany) Jannik Seibel; 20 (Germany) Philip Stegemann; 2 (United States) Omari Williams S; Special teams: 14 (Germany) Maximillian Eisenhut K; 30 (Germany) Nils Schauerte P; 33 (Germany) Sebastian Van Sentan K	Rookies in italics Roster updated November 22, 2023; 6 A-import, 6 E-import, 60 homegrown 72 active

=== Transactions ===
From Cologne Centurions: Max Richter, Flamur Simon, Marius Kensy, Jannik Lörcks

From Barcelona Dragons: Alejandro Fernández

From Stuttgart Surge: Benjamin Barnes

== Staff ==
Rhein Fire (ELF) staff
Front office: CEO – Martin Wagner; General manager – Tom Aust; President of football operations – Jim Tomsula; Director of administration - Detlef Reck; Director of operation & logistics - Mario Schulz; Director of player personnel – Timur Beckmann; Chief of staff - Frank Joachim; Cheer & Dance director – Nini Pohlmann; Head coach: Head coach – Jim Tomsula; Assistant head coach – Detlef Reck; Offensive coaches: Offensive coordinator – Andrew Weidinger; Quarterbacks – Allan Verbraeken; Running backs – Thorsten Estermann; Tight ends – Timur Beckmann; Offensive line – Erol Seval; Assistant offensive line – Sascha Spils	Defensive coaches: Defensive coordinator – Richard Kent; Defensive backs – Stephan Schacht; Assistant defensive backs – Jörg Mackenthun; Linebacker – Patrick Köpper; Assistant linebacker – Thomas Innig; Defensive line – Christian Heister; Assistant defensive line – Peter Schiefer; Special teams coaches: Special teams coordinator/Wide receivers – Mario Schulz; Staff updated March 14, 2023
