= Dartez Jacobs =

American football player (born 1993)

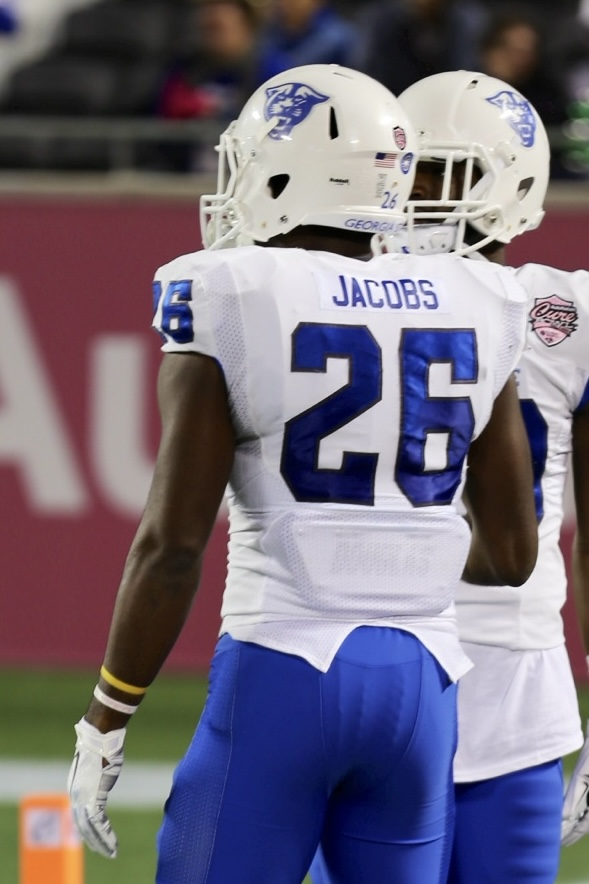
- Jacobs at Georgia State in 2015

Profile
- Position: Safety

Personal information
- Born: September 13, 1993 (age 33); Atlanta, Georgia, U.S.
- Listed height: 6 ft 1 in (1.85 m)
- Listed weight: 206 lb (93 kg)

Career information
- High school: Centennial (GA)
- College: College of the Canyons; Georgia State
- NFL draft: 2016: undrafted

Career history
- New Yorker Lions (2017)*; Kirchdorf Wildcats (2018); Cologne Centurions (2021); Raiders Tirol 2022)*; New Orleans Breakers (2022–2023)
- * Offseason or practice squad member only

Awards and highlights
- 2015 Cure Bowl Soldier Service Award

Dartez Rashard Jacobs (born September 13, 1993) is an American football safety. He played college football at Georgia State. Jacobs currently serves as president of the United Football League Players Association.

== Early life ==
Jacobs attended Centennial High School, where he was a three-sport athlete in football, basketball and baseball. He originally committed to attend Valdosta State to play college football, before transferring to College of the Canyons.

== College career ==
After redshirting his true freshman season, Jacobs began his college career at College of the Canyons. Rated as a two-star recruit by Rivals.com,, Jacobs signed with Georgia State for his remaining collegiate eligibility. In his redshirt senior season, Jacobs was recognized for his service in the community, being named a recipient of the Cure Bowl Soldier Service Award.

== Professional career ==
Pre-draft measurables
| Height | Weight | Arm length | Hand span | 40-yard dash | 10-yard split | 20-yard split | 20-yard shuttle | Bench press |
|---|---|---|---|---|---|---|---|---|
| 6 ft 1 in (1.85 m) | 201 lb (91 kg) | 32 1/4 in (0.82 m) | 9 3/4 in (0.25 m) | 4.6 s | 1.56 s | 2.68 s | 4.3 s | 11 reps |
All values from Pro Day

After not being selected in the 2016 NFL draft, Jacobs was invited to participate in the nearby Atlanta Falcons locals day, but was not offered a contract. He accepted an invite to the Montreal Alouettes rookie camp.

=== New Yorker Lions ===
In 2017 Jacobs signed with the New Yorker Lions as a reserve American import.

=== Kirchdorf Wildcats ===
In 2018 Jacobs signed with the Kirchdorf Wildcats during their first season as one of 16 teams in the German Football League. Jacobs split time between cornerback and safety, recording 92 tackles, 4 interceptions, 13 passes deflected, and 4 tackles-for-loss.

=== Cologne Centurions ===
Jacobs signed with the Cologne Centurions of the newly formed European League of Football (ELF) ahead of the 2021 season. He compiled 41 tackles, 3 tackles for loss, 1 sack, 1 interception, 6 pass breakups, and 2 forced fumbles.

=== Raiders Tirol ===
On January 11, 2022, Jacobs signed with Raiders Tirol.

=== New Orleans Breakers ===
After the European League of Football expanded to Austria Jacobs would opt out of his contract entering the USFL Draft pool.

Jacobs was selected with the sixth pick in the 18th round of the 2022 USFL draft by the New Orleans Breakers. He was placed on injured reserve on May 24, 2022, after suffering an injury. After undergoing treatment and rehabilitation for post-concussion syndrome, Jacobs announced his pledge to the Concussion Legacy Foundation (CLF).

=== Professional statistics ===
| Year | Team | Games played | Starts | Tackles | | | | | Pass coverage | | | | Fumbles | | | Other | |
| Year | Team | Games played | Starts | Total | Solo | Ast | TFL | Sack | INT | Yds | TD | BrUp | FF | FR | TD | Blk | Saf |
|---|---|---|---|---|---|---|---|---|---|---|---|---|---|---|---|---|---|
| 2018 | Kirchdorf | 14 | 14 | 92 | 55 | 37 | 3 | 0 | 4 | 0 | 0 | 13 | 0 | 0 | 0 | 0 | 0 |
| GFL total | | 14 | 14 | 92 | 55 | 37 | 3 | 0 | 4 | 0 | 0 | 13 | 0 | 0 | 0 | 0 | 0 |
Source: stats.gfl.info
European League of Football
| 2021 | Cologne Centurions | 8 | 8 | 41 | 38 | 3 | 3 | 1 | 1 | 8 | 0 | 7 | 2 | 1 | 0 | 1 | 0 |
| ELF total | | 8 | 8 | 41 | 38 | 3 | 3 | 1 | 1 | 8 | 0 | 7 | 2 | 1 | 0 | 1 | 0 |
Source: stats.europeanleague.football
United States Football League
| 2022 | New Orleans Breakers | 2 | 2 | 6 | 5 | 1 | 0 | 0 | 0 | 0 | 0 | 1 | 0 | 0 | 0 | 0 | 0 |
| USFL total | | 2 | 2 | 6 | 5 | 1 | 0 | 0 | 0 | 0 | 0 | 1 | 0 | 0 | 0 | 0 | 0 |

== Executive career ==
On March 13, 2023, Jacobs was named the president of the United Football League Players Association.
