= Kai Locksley =

American gridiron football player (born 1996)

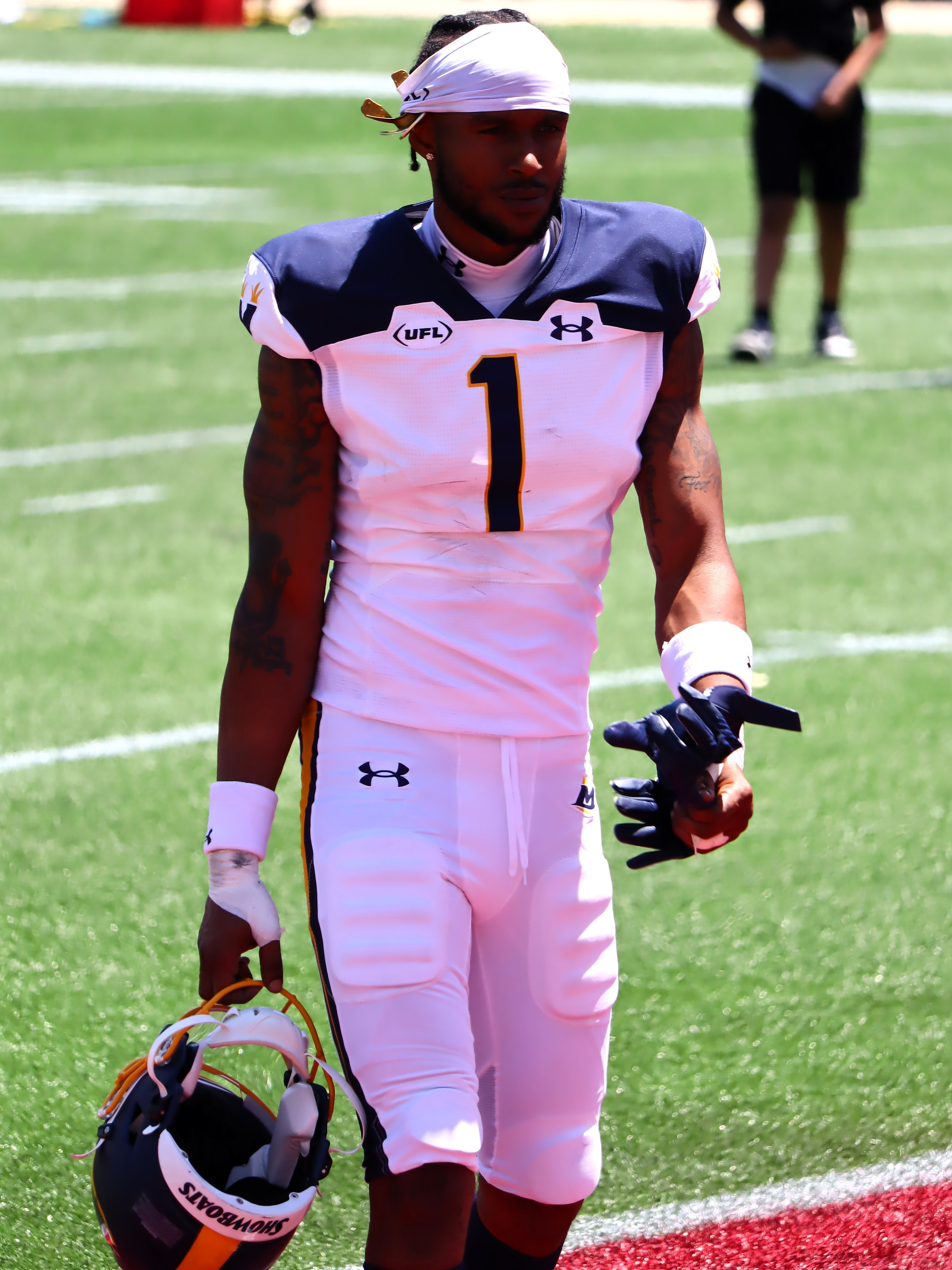
- Locksley with the Memphis Showboats in 2025

No. 10 – Dallas Renegades
- Position: Wide receiver
- Roster status: Active

Personal information
- Born: November 17, 1996 (age 29); Westport, New York, U.S.
- Listed height: 6 ft 4 in (1.93 m)
- Listed weight: 207 lb (94 kg)

Career information
- High school: Gilman School (Baltimore, Maryland)
- College: UTEP (2017–2019)
- NFL draft: 2021: undrafted

Career history
- Miami Dolphins (2021)*; Edmonton Elks (2022–2023); Hamilton Tiger-Cats (2023); Memphis Showboats (2025); Houston Gamblers (2026)
- * Offseason or practice squad member only

Career CFL statistics
- Rushing attempts: 74
- Rushing yards: 148
- Rushing touchdowns: 9
- Receptions: 20
- Receiving yards: 345

Kai Locksley (born November 17, 1996) is an American professional football player who has played as both a quarterback and wide receiver. He signed with the Miami Dolphins of the National Football League (NFL) in 2021 before continuing his professional career with the Edmonton Elks and Hamilton Tiger-Cats of the Canadian Football League (CFL), and the Memphis Showboats and Houston Gamblers of the United Football League (UFL). During his collegiate career, Locksley earned NJCAA Offensive Player of the Year and First-Team All-American honours while playing quarterback in 2017.

== Early life ==
Locksley grew up in Washington, D.C., and attended the prestigious Gilman School in Baltimore, Maryland, where he established himself as a nationally ranked football prospect and accomplished multi-sport athlete.

A highly recruited, consensus four-star prospect, Locksley was ranked No. 9 nationally among athletes and No. 3 overall in Maryland by 247Sports. He was also ranked the top quarterback prospect in Maryland by Scout. His national recruitment attracted more than 20 collegiate football scholarship offers, including offers from Alabama, Auburn, Florida State, and Ohio State.

Under head coach Biff Poggi, Locksley earned two Associated Press All-State selections and second-team All-Metro recognition from The Baltimore Sun. During his junior season in 2013, he passed for 875 yards and five touchdowns while rushing for 795 yards and 14 touchdowns. As a senior in 2014, he rushed for 1,050 yards and 17 touchdowns while passing for an additional 915 yards and five touchdowns. His senior campaign included leading Gilman on an eight-game winning streak and securing a share of the Maryland Interscholastic Athletic Association (MIAA) A Conference championship. His achievements earned him selection to the 2015 Under Armour All-America Game.

Beyond football, Locksley also excelled in basketball, earning All-Conference honors after leading Gilman in scoring with an average of 15 points per game during his junior year. He also competed in track and field, further demonstrating his multi-sport athletic background.

Following his nationally recognized high school career, Locksley initially committed to Florida State University before changing his commitment to the University of Texas shortly before National Signing Day in February 2015.

== College career ==
Locksley began his collegiate career at the University of Texas in 2015, where he redshirted his freshman season before transitioning from quarterback to wide receiver. Seeking an opportunity to return to his original position, he transferred to Arizona Western College before joining Iowa Western Community College for the 2017 season.

At Iowa Western, Locksley established himself as one of the nation's leading junior college quarterbacks, earning the prestigious 2017 Spalding NJCAA Offensive Player of the Year award and first-team All-America honors. His breakout season saw him account for 40 touchdowns, including 20 passing and 20 rushing, while accumulating 2,238 passing yards and 705 rushing yards. He completed 66.4 percent of his passes and threw just six interceptions, helping lead the Reivers to an 11–1 record and a No. 2 finish in the final national NJCAA rankings.

Locksley concluded his award-winning season with an outstanding performance in the 2017 Graphic Edge Bowl, leading third-ranked Iowa Western to a 36–19 victory over fifth-ranked Northwest Mississippi Community College. In the championship-stage matchup, he completed 31 of 46 passes for 274 yards and four passing touchdowns, while adding a fifth rushing touchdown. His success attracted national attention, with Athlon Sports ranking Locksley third among its ten junior college transfer quarterbacks most likely to make an impact in the 2018 NCAA season.

Following his nationally recognized junior college career, Locksley transferred to the University of Texas at El Paso (UTEP), joining the Miners as a quarterback under head coach Dana Dimel. He earned the starting role in his first season, making eight starts in 2018. He quickly distinguished himself as a dual-threat quarterback, producing several performances of historical significance for the program.

In September 2018, Locksley rushed for 119 yards and two touchdowns against UNLV, recording the most rushing yards by a UTEP quarterback in a single game since 1994. Later that month, he rushed for another 106 yards against UTSA, becoming the first UTEP quarterback in 35 years to record multiple 100-yard rushing games in a single season. In the same game, he became the first UTEP quarterback since 1994 to surpass both 100 passing yards and 100 rushing yards in a single contest. By the end of the season, his six rushing touchdowns tied for the second-most by a UTEP quarterback in the program's modern era, dating to 1965.

During his senior season in 2019, Locksley continued to demonstrate his dual-threat capabilities, passing for 1,329 yards and six touchdowns while adding 535 rushing yards and five rushing touchdowns. In November, he delivered one of his most productive individual performances, setting a career high with 358 passing yards while rushing for another 103 yards and accounting for three touchdowns against New Mexico State. Across his two seasons at UTEP, Locksley finished with 2,266 passing yards, 875 rushing yards, and 20 combined touchdowns.

== Professional career ==
Pre-draft measurables
Height	Weight	Arm length	Hand span	Wingspan	20-yard shuttle	Three-cone drill	Vertical jump	Broad jump
6 ft 3 3/4 in (1.92 m)	209 lb (95 kg)	32 3/4 in (0.83 m)	9 3/4 in (0.25 m)	6 ft 7 1/4 in (2.01 m)	4.36 s	7.07 s	38.0 in (0.97 m)	10 ft 6 in (3.20 m)
All values from Pro Day

=== Miami Dolphins ===
Following his collegiate career, Locksley entered the National Football League (NFL), signing with the Miami Dolphins as an undrafted free agent on March 23, 2021. Originally a collegiate quarterback, he joined Miami as a wide receiver, demonstrating his ability to compete professionally at multiple offensive positions. During the 2021 NFL preseason, he appeared in all three games, recording five receptions for 46 yards. He remained with the Dolphins through training camp before being released during the team's final roster cuts on August 31, 2021.

=== Edmonton Elks ===
Locksley signed with the Edmonton Elks of the Canadian Football League (CFL) on January 12, 2022, joining the team as a quarterback. He quickly established himself as a versatile offensive player, earning a starting role at slotback while also contributing at quarterback.

In his CFL debut against the BC Lions, Locksley scored the Elks' first touchdown of the 2022 season on a quarterback sneak. He went on to become an important contributor to Edmonton's offence, appearing in 16 regular-season games and making 12 starts at slotback during his rookie campaign.

Despite being recruited as a quarterback, Locksley recorded 17 receptions for 247 yards while adding 117 rushing yards and seven rushing touchdowns. His seven touchdowns tied for the team lead in scoring touchdowns during the 2022 season. He also completed five of eight passes for 50 yards, highlighting his ability to contribute as both a passer and receiver in the same season.

Entering the 2023 season, Locksley was selected as Edmonton's starting quarterback for its preseason opener against the Calgary Stampeders. After appearing in three regular-season games, he was released by Edmonton on June 26, 2023.

=== Hamilton Tiger-Cats ===
Locksley signed with the Hamilton Tiger-Cats on July 5, 2023, continuing his CFL career as a versatile quarterback and receiver.

On July 28, 2023, he delivered a decisive performance against the Ottawa Redblacks, recording two receptions for a team-high 91 receiving yards, including a 75-yard touchdown reception from quarterback Bo Levi Mitchell. The touchdown broke a 9–9 tie late in the third quarter and helped secure Hamilton's 16–12 victory.

Locksley appeared in 15 regular-season games for Hamilton in 2023, contributing two rushing touchdowns and one receiving touchdown. He also appeared in the Tiger-Cats' postseason game that year before becoming a free agent in February 2024, due to contract expiration.

=== Memphis Showboats ===
Locksley returned to professional football in 2025, signing with the Memphis Showboats of the United Football League (UFL) on February 3. He established himself as part of the team's receiving corps, appearing in nine regular-season games with five starts and recording 13 receptions for 180 yards.

On May 16, 2025, Locksley made a crucial contribution to Memphis' 24–22 overtime victory against the San Antonio Brahmas. During the UFL's alternating two-point conversion shootout, he caught a pass from quarterback Troy Williams for Memphis' second successful conversion, providing what proved to be the decisive two points.

He concluded the 2025 season with five receptions for 55 yards against the Birmingham Stallions, his highest reception total in a game that season.

=== Houston Gamblers ===
Following his season with Memphis, Locksley was selected by the Houston Gamblers in the 2026 UFL Draft on January 13, 2026, continuing his professional career at wide receiver. He subsequently appeared for Houston during the 2026 UFL season.

== Personal life ==
Locksley is the son of University of Maryland head coach Mike Locksley. His older brother, Meiko, played college football at New Mexico, Iowa Western, and Lackawanna College.

Locksley was suspended from the UTEP football team on June 8, 2019, after being arrested on charges of driving while intoxicated, marijuana possession, making terroristic threats and illegal possession of a firearm. He was reinstated from his suspension on August 2, 2019 and all charges were subsequently dropped.
