= Cologne Centurions =

Two American football franchises have been referred to as the Cologne Centurions:

- Cologne Centurions (NFL Europe), active in NFL Europe between 2004 and 2007;
- Cologne Centurions (ELF), active in the European League of Football since 2021.
