= Deion Harris =

American gridiron football player (born 1995)

Hamburg Sea Devils (ELF)
- Position: Cornerback
- Roster status: active

Personal information
- Born: December 18, 1995 (age 30)
- Listed height: 6 ft 3.1 in (1.91 m)
- Listed weight: 224.7 lb (102 kg)

Career information
- High school: Hibbing High School (Hibbing, Minnesota)
- College: North Dakota
- NFL draft: 2019: undrafted

Career history
- Washington Redskins (2019)*; DC Defenders (2020); Toronto Argonauts (2022); Hamburg Sea Devils (2023–present)
- * Offseason or practice squad member only

Awards and highlights
- First-team All-Big Sky (2016)
- Stats at Pro Football Reference

Deion Harris (born 18 December 1995) is an American football cornerback who plays for the Hamburg Sea Devils in the European League of Football. He played college football at North Dakota.

== Early life ==
Harris attended Hibbing High School in Hibbing, Minnesota. As a senior, he was a quarterback on offense and a safety on defense. He was named to the All-Conference team in each of his final two high school years. On National Signing Day in February 2014, he was introduced as a recruit to the North Dakota Fighting Hawks after verbally committing to the university back in December.

== College career ==
As a freshman at North Dakota, Harris appeared in all twelve games as a reserve at the cornerback position and on special teams. As a sophomore, he started every game and recorded 12 pass break-ups, which tied for the most passes defended in the Division I era for the Fighting Hawks. In his junior year in 2016, he recorded 36 tackles and nine pass break-ups. His five interceptions led all players in the Big Sky Conference. As a result, he was selected to the FCS All-American as well as the All-Big Sky first team by the AFCA and AP. In July 2017, Harris tore his left Achilles tendon during a workout, causing him to sit out a year as a medical redshirt and play his final year of college in 2018. In the process, he recorded 24 tackles and seven pass break-ups.

== Professional career ==
After being projected as a draft pick prior to his injury, he went undrafted in the 2019 NFL draft. He participated in a minicamp with the Green Bay Packers in the spring before being signed by the Washington Redskins (now Washington Commanders) in May 2019. He appeared in four games during the preseason, recording eight tackles and four pass break-ups. On August 30, Harris was released by the Redskins as part of the final roster shuffle. He was then placed on the practice squad, from which he was released on October 8.

In the 2020 XFL season, Harris signed with the DC Defenders. He made his XFL debut in the fourth week of play, which suspended play a week and a half later due to the COVID-19 pandemic. In two games, Harris had five tackles. In April 2022, he was signed by the Toronto Argonauts of the Canadian Football League (CFL). Harris appeared for the team in the preseason, recording one interception. He was released before the start of the season.

Harris signed with the Hamburg Sea Devils of the European League of Football (ELF) ahead of the 2023 ELF season.

=== Professional statistics ===
Year	Team	GP	Tackles						Interceptions				
Year	Team	GP	Cmb	Solo	Ast	TFL	Yds	Sck	FF	PD	Int	Yds	TD
European League of Football
2023	Hamburg Sea Devils	0	0	0	0	0	0	0	0	0	0	0	0
ELF total		0	0	0	0	0	0	0	0	0	0	0	0
Source: europeanleague.football

== Personal life ==
Harris is the son of former NFL player Johnnie Harris.
