= Adedayo Odeleye =

Nigerian-British gridiron football player (born 1997)

No. 96 – Dallas Cowboys
- Position: Defensive tackle
- Roster status: Practice squad

Personal information
- Born: 17 October 1997 (age 29); Lagos, Nigeria
- Listed height: 6 ft 5 in (1.96 m)
- Listed weight: 283 lb (128 kg)

Career information
- College: Loughborough (UK)
- NFL draft: 2022: undrafted

Career history
- Berlin Thunder (2021); Houston Texans (2022–2023)*; Baltimore Ravens (2024)*; Dallas Cowboys (2025–present)*
- * Offseason or practice squad member only

Awards and highlights
- ELF All Star Team 2021
- Stats at Pro Football Reference

Adedayo Odeleye (born October 17, 1997) is a Nigerian-British American football defensive tackle for the Dallas Cowboys of the National Football League (NFL). He has previously played for the Berlin Thunder of the European League of Football (ELF).

== Early life ==
Odeleye was born in Lagos, Nigeria and his family moved to the United Kingdom when he was nine.

== College career ==
He played his first football games for Loughborough University in 2017. He was also active in rugby.

== Professional career ==
Pre-draft measurables
Height	Weight	Arm length	Hand span	Wingspan	40-yard dash	10-yard split	20-yard split	20-yard shuttle	Three-cone drill	Vertical jump	Broad jump	Bench press
6 ft 5 1/8 in (1.96 m)	264 lb (120 kg)	34 3/4 in (0.88 m)	9 5/8 in (0.24 m)	7 ft 0 3/8 in (2.14 m)	4.96 s	1.76 s	2.87 s	4.66 s	7.43 s	30.5 in (0.77 m)	9 ft 4 in (2.84 m)	23 reps
All values from Pro Day

In March 2021, he was accepted into the NFL International Player Pathway Program (IPPP), but ultimately was not signed for the NFL.

=== Berlin Thunder ===
In the 2021 season, he played for the Berlin Thunder in the European League of Football. With 34 tackles (14 for a loss), seven sacks and a recovered fumble in eight games, he was selected to the ELF All Star Team.

=== Houston Texans ===
Odeleye was invited back to the NFL IPPP in 2022 and was ultimately signed by the Houston Texans for the 2022 season. He was waived by Houston on August 31, 2022, but was re–signed to the team's practice squad the following day. On January 10, 2023, Odeleye signed a reserve/future contract with the Texans. He was waived by Houston as a part of final roster cuts on August 29, but was re–signed to the practice squad the next day. On January 29, 2024, Odeleye's contract expired with the team and he was waived.

=== Baltimore Ravens ===
On August 30, 2024, Odeleye was signed to the Baltimore Ravens' practice squad. He signed a reserve/future contract with Baltimore on January 21, 2025.

On August 26, 2025, Odeleye was waived by the Ravens as part of final roster cuts.

=== Dallas Cowboys ===
On August 27, 2025, Odeleye signed with the Dallas Cowboys' practice squad. He signed a reserve/future contract with Dallas on January 6, 2026. On August 30, Odeleye was waived by the Cowboys as a part of final roster cuts; he was re–signed to the team's practice squad the next day.
