= 2023 Paris Musketeers season =

American football team in France

- General manager: Marc-Angelo Soumah
- Head coach: Marc Mattioli
- Home stadium: Stade Jean Bouin

The 2023 Paris Musketeers season is the inaugural season of the Paris Musketeers team in the European League of Football for the 2023 season.

== Preseason ==
After the announcement of the long awaited franchise, the front office was presented. It consists of Patrick Butler, CFL Grey Cup winner Jason Johnson and John McKeon, all operating as directors. Further general manager Marc-Angelo Soumah and president Frantzy Dorlean are member of the board.

The head coach of the franchise for the first season will be former Vanderbilt Commodores' defensive secondary coach Marc Mattioli.

The first ever tryout camp of the team was organized on 20 November 2022 with around 240 French and international players in attendance in the Paris La Défense Arena. Shortly after, the first players were announced with French nationals Mamadou Sy and Mamadou Doumbouya, both having their origins from the national league champion La Courneuve Flash. Further building blocks of the roster consists of the first ever franchise quarterback Zach Edwards and wide receiver Kyle Sweet, both coming from the Barcelona Dragons.

== Regular season ==
=== Standings ===
Western Conference
Pos	Team	GP	W	L	CONF	PF	PA	DIFF	STK	Qualification
1	(Germany) Rhein Fire	12	12	0	8–0	540	199	+341	W12	Automatic playoffs (#1)
2	(Germany) Frankfurt Galaxy	12	10	2	6–2	382	233	+149	L1	Advance to playoffs (#4)
3	(France) Paris Musketeers	12	6	6	4–4	320	277	+43	W4	
4	(Germany) Hamburg Sea Devils	12	4	8	2–6	247	278	–31	L4	
5	(Germany) Cologne Centurions	12	4	8	0–8	186	330	–144	L1	

Source: europeanleague.football

== Roster ==
Paris Musketeers roster
Quarterbacks: 1 Zach Edwards (United States); Running backs: 2 Jason Aguemon (France); 33 Jason Bofunda (France); 45 Chris Voumbo (France); 24 Stephen Yepmo (France); 21 Meril Zero (France); Wide receivers: 18 Jefferson Alexandre (France); 5 Rémi Bertellin (France); 85 Steve Delaval (France); 10 Mickael Doukouré (France); 15 Stéphane Fortes (France); 13 Florian Larose (France); 14 Cheikhou Sow (France); 7 Kyle Sweet (United States); Tight ends: 8 Adrià Botella Moreno (Spain); 11 Brandon Camara (France)	Offensive linemen: 70 Nyohor Badiane (France); 71 Mamoudou Doumbouya (France); 64 Ryan Iguedjtal (France); 78 Max Gaye (France); 77 Sébastien Jallier (France); 52 Nabil Marzougui (France); 72 Wally-Molla Camara (France); 60 Celestin Ngimbi (Spain); 79 Eduardo Sanchez González (Spain); Defensive linemen: 17 Randy Abandzounou (France); 90 Vincent Buffet (France); 99 Willem Dendelé (France); 98 Edwin Élio (France); 58 Jack Loew (Australia); 97 Averdié Mizius (France); 56 Giovanni Nanguy (France); 55 Mamadou Sy (France); 44 Stanley Zeregbe (France)	Linebackers: 42 Dauson Dales (United States); 40 Djilan Eustache (France); 27 Rayan Khefif (France); 19 Sofiane Khezami (France); 32 Marcus Thouant (France); 35 Paul Véritas (France); Defensive backs: 4 Digaan Gomis Katchanga (France); 3 Amir Kilani (France); 6 Ibel Ahidazan (France); 9 Kenny Floret (France); 20 Wadjihe Said (France); 22 Félix Proulx (Italy); 23 Khefil Osseni (France); 28 Vincent Lemoine (France); 30 Cam Hilton (United States); 36 Maxime Roger (France); 41 Davidson Larochel (France); Special teams: 25 Benjamin Bono K/P (France)	Rookies in italics updated November 21, 2023; 3 A-import, 5 E-import, 44 homegrown 52 active
