= Marcel Dabo =

German gridiron football player (born 2000)

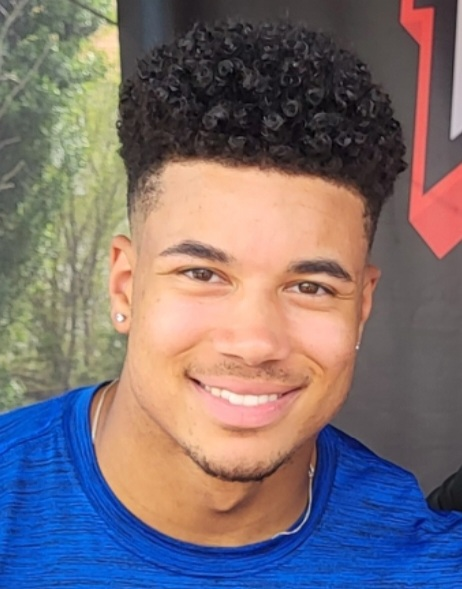
- Dabo in 2022

Profile
- Position: Safety

Personal information
- Born: January 10, 2000 (age 26); Reutlingen, Germany
- Listed height: 6 ft 0 in (1.83 m)
- Listed weight: 208 lb (94 kg)

Career information
- College: University of Tübingen (Tübingen, Germany)
- NFL draft: 2022: undrafted
- CFL draft: 2022G: 2nd round, 16th overall pick

Career history
- Stuttgart Surge (2021); Indianapolis Colts (2022–2024)*
- * Offseason or practice squad member only

Awards and highlights
- ELF Defensive Rookie of the Year (2021)
- Stats at Pro Football Reference

Marcel Dabo (born January 10, 2000) is a German professional American football safety. He has played for the Indianapolis Colts of the National Football League (NFL) and the Stuttgart Surge of the European League of Football (ELF).

== Early life ==
Dabo grew up in Reutlingen, Baden-Württemberg, Germany. A former soccer player, Dabo gained an interest in American football as a teenager while attending a Wisconsin football game during a student exchange program to Hamilton High School. After returning to Germany, Dabo joined the Red Knights Tübingen and Stuttgart Scorpions youth American football programs.

== Professional career ==
Pre-draft measurables
| Height | Weight | Arm length | Hand span | Wingspan | 40-yard dash | 10-yard split | 20-yard split | 20-yard shuttle | Three-cone drill | Vertical jump | Broad jump | Bench press |
|---|---|---|---|---|---|---|---|---|---|---|---|---|
| 6 ft 0 1/4 in (1.84 m) | 208 lb (94 kg) | 30 7/8 in (0.78 m) | 9 7/8 in (0.25 m) | 6 ft 4 1/2 in (1.94 m) | 4.43 s | 1.52 s | 2.55 s | 4.34 s | 7.06 s | 40.5 in (1.03 m) | 11 ft 3 in (3.43 m) | 21 reps |
All values from Pro Day

=== Stuttgart Surge ===
Dabo played cornerback and kick returner for the Stuttgart Surge of the European League of Football in 2021. He was named to the league's all-star team and won Defensive Rookie of the Year.

In preparation for the NFL draft, Dabo was invited to participate in an NFL Pro Day at Arizona State. After going undrafted in the 2022 NFL draft, he was assigned to the Indianapolis Colts through the NFL's International Player Pathway Program. He was also selected by the BC Lions in the second round of the 2022 CFL global draft, though he chose to sign with the Colts.

=== Indianapolis Colts ===
In the first game of the 2022 NFL preseason, Dabo played on one special teams play against the Buffalo Bills. In the next preseason game against the Detroit Lions, Dabo recorded 3 tackles on 33 defensive plays. The Colts signed Dabo to their practice squad on August 31, 2022. He signed a reserve/futures contract on January 9, 2023.

The Colts waived Dabo on August 29, 2023. Dabo re-signed to the practice squad on August 30. On November 12, as part of the NFL International Series, the Colts played in Dabo's home country of Germany for the first time in the team's history, defeating the New England Patriots; however, Dabo was unavailable to be elevated from the practice squad to play, due to a knee injury. Zavier Scott, who played running back for the Colts, graduated from high school in Germany and was present for the game as well.

Dabo was waived by the Colts on August 27, 2024, and re-signed to the practice squad. He signed a reserve/future contract with Indianapolis on January 6, 2025. On May 15, Dabo was waived by the Colts.
