= Madre London =

American football player (born 1996)

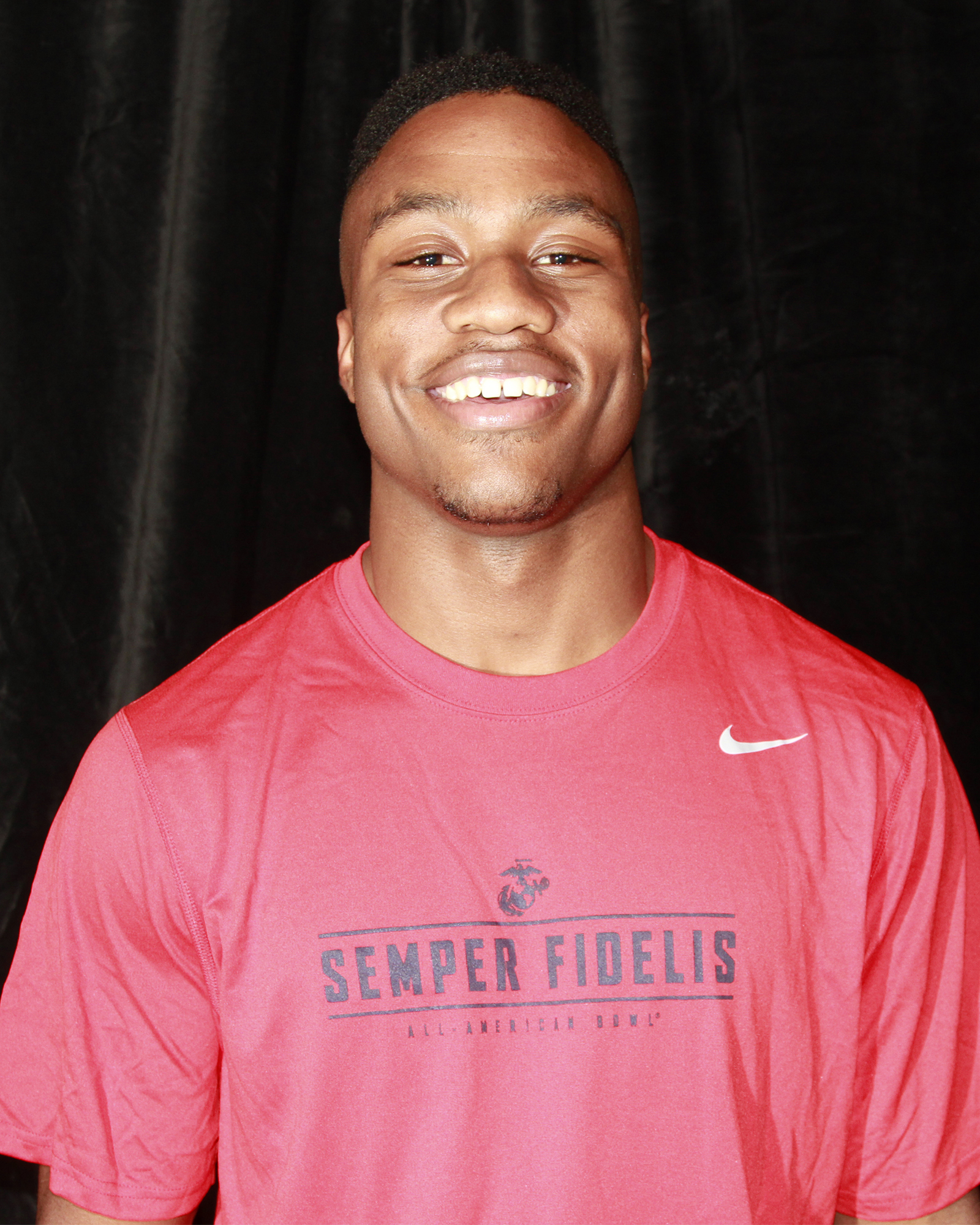
- London in 2013

No. 28
- Position: Running back

Personal information
- Born: January 27, 1996 (age 30); Little Rock, Arkansas, U.S.
- Listed height: 6 ft 1 in (1.85 m)
- Listed weight: 218 lb (99 kg)

Career information
- High school: St. Thomas Aquinas (Fort Lauderdale, Florida)
- College: Michigan State (2014–2017); Tennessee (2018)
- NFL draft: 2019: undrafted

Career history
- TSL Alphas (2020); FCF Glacier Boyz (2021); Cologne Centurions (2021); Pittsburgh Maulers (2022–2023); Danube Dragons (2024)

Awards and highlights
- ELF Most Valuable Player (2021); ELF All-Star (2021); ELF rushing yards leader (2021); ELF rushing touchdowns leader (2021); AFI All-Europe First Team (2021)

Madre London (born January 27, 1996) is an American professional football running back. He played college football at Michigan State and Tennessee.

== Early life ==
London originally attended Bryant High School in Bryant, Arkansas, a suburb of Little Rock. He led the Hornets to a conference title while rushing for 969 yards and 13 touchdowns as a freshman.

London transferred to St. Thomas Aquinas High School in Fort Lauderdale, Florida for his final two years. As a senior he rushed for 871 yards and 16 touchdowns, earning Sun-Sentinel second-team all-Broward County honors and an invitation to the 2014 Semper Fidelis All-American Bowl.

London was considered a four-star recruit by Rivals, and a three-star recruit by 247Sports and ESPN. Rivals also ranked him as the 17th best running back in the nation. He received over two dozen offers, ultimately committing to Michigan State in November 2013.

== College career ==
=== Michigan State ===
London played for the Michigan State Spartans from 2014 to 2017, rushing for 924 yards and eight touchdowns while serving a complimentary role behind LJ Scott. He redshirted the 2014 season as the backfield included seniors Jeremy Langford and Nick Hill.

In 2015, London recorded 119 carries for 500 yards and three touchdowns, ranking third on the team in both categories. After impressing in the preseason scrimmages, he was moved to the top of the depth chart by coach Mark Dantonio. London ran for 59 yards and two touchdowns in his collegiate debut against Western Michigan. The following week, he rushed for a game-high 103 yards on 18 attempts in a 31–28 win over #7 Oregon, including a career-long 62-yard run on their opening drive. London started the first six games before spraining his ankle against Rutgers, forcing him to miss the next three games. He rushed for just 101 yards for the remainder of the reason, but that did include a 60-yard-performance against Iowa in the Big Ten Championship Game.

In 2016, London played offensive snaps in just seven games, with sophomore LJ Scott and junior Gerald Holmes taking most of the load at running back. London recorded 28 carries for 120 yards and two touchdowns in his limited role. In his best game that season, he ran for 52 yards and two touchdowns against Rutgers. The Spartans won just three games.

In 2017, London had 83 carries for 304 yards and three touchdowns. He ran for 127 yards in the spring game, eclipsing his previous season's total yardage. In the season opener against Bowling Green, he had 10 carries for 54 yards and a touchdown. He ran for 59 yards and caught a touchdown at #7 Michigan, then rushed for 74 yards and a touchdown the following week at Minnesota. The Spartans beat Washington State 42–17 in the Holiday Bowl to finish with a 10–3 record.

=== Tennessee ===
After graduating from Michigan State with his sociology degree in May 2018, London joined Tennessee as a graduate transfer. He was recruited in part by then-offensive quality control assistant Montario Hardesty, himself a former Tennessee and Cleveland Browns running back. In his lone season with the Volunteers, London recorded 206 yards and three touchdowns on 42 attempts, averaging a career-best 4.9 yards per carry, under head coach Jeremy Pruitt.

London contributed two touchdowns in their 59–3 blowout of East Tennessee State, then ran for a season-high 74 yards on just nine carries the following week against UTEP. In their SEC opener against Florida, he had 11 carries for 66 yards and a touchdown. However, London's role decreased drastically after that, recording just nine carries over the last eight games. He was selected to play in the SPIRAL Tropical Bowl at the conclusion of the season.

=== Statistics ===
				Rushing				Receiving		
Year	Team	GP	Att	Yards	Avg	TDs	Rec	Yards	Avg	TDs
2014	Michigan State	–	–	–	–	–	–	–	–	–
2015	Michigan State	11	119	500	4.2	3	3	23	7.7	0
2016	Michigan State	7	28	120	4.3	2	1	15	15.0	0
2017	Michigan State	12	83	304	3.7	3	9	62	6.9	1
2018	Tennessee	10	42	206	4.9	3	2	5	2.5	0
Career		40	272	1,130	4.2	11	15	105	7.0	1

== Professional career ==
Pre-draft measurables
Height	Weight	Arm length	Hand span	40-yard dash	10-yard split	20-yard split	20-yard shuttle	Three-cone drill	Vertical jump	Broad jump	Bench press
6 ft 1 in (1.85 m)	215 lb (98 kg)	31 7/8 in (0.81 m)	10 3/8 in (0.26 m)	4.62 s	1.63 s	2.69 s	4.58 s	7.19 s	31 1/2 in (0.80 m)	10 ft 01 in (3.07 m)	19 reps
All values from Pro Day

=== The Spring League ===
After going undrafted in the 2019 NFL draft, London signed with the Alphas of The Spring League on October 17, 2020. He rushed for 61 yards on 16 carries in their week two victory over the Conquerors, but that would be his final game with the team as their next game was forfeited and the remainder of the 2020 Fall season was cancelled amidst the COVID-19 pandemic.

=== FCF ===
London then joined the inaugural 2021 Fan Controlled Football season, a new league run by fan decisions where players are drafted to new teams every week. He had 13 carries for 41 yards and three receptions for 23 yards in the four-game season.

=== Cologne Centurions ===
London signed with the Cologne Centurions of the newly formed European League of Football (ELF) ahead of the 2021 season. In his league debut, he rushed for 269 yards and three touchdowns as the Centurions lost 55–39 to the Panthers Wrocław. He was then named the week two MVP after rushing for 352 yards and four touchdowns in their home opener against the Barcelona Dragons, which they won 40–12. In their week three victory over the Leipzig Kings, London recorded 348 yards and four touchdowns. He only ran for 85 yards in the next game against the Frankfurt Galaxy, but surpassed the 1,000-yard mark on the season in just four games. In week 7, London once again earned weekly MVP honors for recording 320 yards and four touchdowns in their win against Wrocław. He added 290 yards and four more touchdowns on the ground the following week against Barcelona. After the Centurions' bye week, London earned his third weekly MVP award by recording 138 rushing yards, a rushing touchdown, and a receiving touchdown in their 19–9 home win against Stuttgart. He passed the 2,000-yard milestone in the game, giving his team a 5–4 record and securing a playoff berth. London was rested, along with some other starters, in the regular season finale. In nine regular-season games, he had 269 carries for 2,009 yards and 22 touchdowns, leading the league in all three categories. The Centurions lost 36–6 to the Frankfurt Galaxy in their first playoff game, with London contributing 168 yards and a touchdown. He was one of the four Americans selected to the All-Star team, and was subsequently named the league's Most Valuable Player. London would later be named to American Football International's 2021 All-Europe first team as a top running back in Europe.

=== Pittsburgh Maulers ===
In September 2021, London re-signed with the Centurions for the 2022 season. However, in April 2022, he joined the Pittsburgh Maulers of the United States Football League just a few weeks ahead of the league's inaugural season. He was signed by the Maulers as a last-minute replacement for De'Veon Smith. London led the Maulers in rushing yards for the 2022 season.

London re-signed with the Maulers on August 8, 2023. The Maulers folded when the XFL and USFL merged to create the United Football League (UFL).

=== Danube Dragons ===
In May 2024, London signed with the Danube Dragons of the Austrian Football League (AFL). He made his team debut just a few days later, catching a touchdown pass in their 45–20 win over Guelfi Firenze in the second round of the Central European Football League (CEFL). In their next game, back in the AFL, London scored four touchdowns and a two-point conversion to lead the Dragons to a 43–39 victory over the Prague Black Panthers. In his third game, the team faced their undefeated league rivals – the Vienna Vikings – in the Vienna derby; London scored an 80-yard touchdown in the 21–17 loss. A few days later, he scored two touchdowns to lead the Dragons to a 12–7 win over the French champions, the Thonon Black Panthers, in the CEFL semifinals. In the CEFL Bowl XVIII, where Danube Dragons had 27–14 victory over the Calanda Broncos, London scored the first touchdown.

=== Statistics ===
Spring leagues statistics
Year	Team	League	Games	Rushing				Receiving			
Year	Team	League	GP	Att	Yds	Avg	TD	Rec	Yds	Avg	TD
2021	CCE	ELF	9	269	2009	7.5	22	11	71	6.5	1
2022	PIT	USFL	10	96	415	4.3	1	8	34	4.3	0
