= 2021 European League of Football season =

2021 ELF season
- League: European League of Football
- Sport: American football
- Duration: June 19 – September 5
- Games: 40 + 3 playoff games
- Teams: 8
- Total attendance: 94,704
- Season MVP: Madre London (Cologne Centurions)

Division Champions
- North Division champions: Hamburg Sea Devils
- South Division champions: Frankfurt Galaxy

2021 Championship Game
- Date: September 26, 2021
- Venue: Merkur Spiel-Arena, Düsseldorf
- Champions: (Germany) Frankfurt Galaxy (1st title)
- Finals MVP: Jakeb Sullivan (Frankfurt Galaxy)

Seasons
- 2022

The 2021 ELF season was the inaugural season of the European League of Football, a newly formed professional American football league based in Europe. It started on June 19, 2021, and ended with the ELF Championship Game in Düsseldorf's Merkur Spiel-Arena, on September 26, 2021. Frankfurt Galaxy won the title, beating Hamburg Sea Devils 32-30.

Map of ELF teams 2021

== Format ==
The league is divided into two divisions, North and South. Each team plays 10 games during the regular season: twice against their division rivals, and twice against two of the teams from the other division. The top two teams in each division qualify for the playoffs, with the North and South champions qualifying for the Championship Game.

== Rules ==
For the inaugural season, the ELF is mostly using adapted NFL rules, as opposed to adapted NCAA rules which virtually all other European American football leagues use. There is a limit of two "Americans" (a category which also includes some other non-European nationalities) per down but people who are dual citizens of the U.S. and an EU-member country are not counted towards that limit in keeping with the Bosman ruling. Unlike in most other European American football leagues there is overtime during regular season games that are still tied after regulation, but the overtime rules are based on NCAA rules.

== Teams ==
Team	City	Stadium	Capacity	Head coach
North Division
Berlin Thunder	(Germany) Berlin	Amateurstadion Olympiapark (Note: First two home games of the season)	5,400	(Canada) Jag Bal
Berlin Thunder	(Germany) Berlin	Friedrich-Ludwig-Jahn-Sportpark (Note: Last three home games of the season)	19,708	(Canada) Jag Bal
Hamburg Sea Devils	(Germany) Hamburg	Stadion Hoheluft	11,000	(Germany) Andreas Nommensen
Leipzig Kings	(Germany) Leipzig	Alfred-Kunze-Sportpark	4,999	(United States) Fred Armstrong
Wrocław Panthers	(Poland) Wrocław	Olympic Stadium	11,000	(Poland) Kuba Samel
South Division
Barcelona Dragons	(Spain) Reus	Estadi Municipal	4,700	(United States) Adam Rita
Cologne Centurions	(Germany) Cologne	Südstadion (Note: First three home games of the season)	11,748	(United States) Kirk Heidelberg
Cologne Centurions	(Germany) Cologne	Ostkampfbahn (Note: Last two home games of the season)	333	(United States) Kirk Heidelberg
Frankfurt Galaxy	(Germany) Frankfurt	PSD Bank Arena	12,542	(Germany) Thomas Kösling
Stuttgart Surge	(Germany) Stuttgart	Gazi-Stadion auf der Waldau	11,410	(Germany) Martin Hanselmann

=== Coaching changes ===
Team	Outgoing coach	Manner of departure	Date of vacancy	Incoming coach	Date of appointment
Hamburg Sea Devils	(United States) Ted Daisher	Released	July 6, 2021	(Germany) Andreas Nommensen	July 13, 2021

=== Salaries ===
For its first season, the league pays a salary to American "import" players that generally ranges from €600 (around $700) to €3,000 ($3,500) per month, and provides housing, health insurance and two meals per day to players during the season. Despite claims to the contrary by the league, most "local" players did not get paid during the 2021 season.

== Regular season ==
=== Standings ===
North Division
Pos	Team	GP	W	L	PF	PA	Div	Qualification
1	(Germany) Hamburg Sea Devils	10	7	3	274	178	4–2	Advance to playoffs
2	(Poland) Wrocław Panthers	10	6	4	314	259	5–1	Advance to playoffs
3	(Germany) Leipzig Kings	10	5	5	295	320	3–3	
4	(Germany) Berlin Thunder	10	3	7	228	296	0–6	

Source: europeanleague.football

South Division
Pos	Team	GP	W	L	PF	PA	Div	Qualification
1	(Germany) Frankfurt Galaxy	10	9	1	357	132	6–0	Advance to playoffs
2	(Germany) Cologne Centurions	10	5	5	310	365	3–3	Advance to playoffs
3	(Spain) Barcelona Dragons	10	3	7	237	277	2–4	
4	(Germany) Stuttgart Surge	10	2	8	157	355	1–5	

Source: europeanleague.football

=== Results ===
Home \ Away	BER	HAM	LEI	WRO	BAR	COL	FRA	STU
Berlin Thunder		20–28	27–37	26–45	19–3			40–19
Hamburg Sea Devils	44–6		17–18	24–30	22–17		17–15	
Leipzig Kings	37–24	0–55		13–21		47–48		49–23
Wrocław Panthers	35–12	23–26	54–28			55–39	7–36	
Barcelona Dragons	48–16	14–32				60–51	14–22	17–21
Cologne Centurions			24–42	33–31	40–12		20–41	19–9
Frankfurt Galaxy		35–9		22–13	42–22	45–7		57–3
Stuttgart Surge	0–38		27–24		12–30	23–39	20–42	

Source: europeanleague.football
Legend: Blue = home team win; Yellow = draw; Red = away team win.

== Playoffs ==
Division Finals
N1	(Germany) Hamburg Sea Devils	30
N2	(Poland) Wrocław Panthers	27
S1	(Germany) Frankfurt Galaxy	36
S2	(Germany) Cologne Centurions	6

Championship Game
(Germany) Hamburg Sea Devils	30
(Germany) Frankfurt Galaxy	32

=== Divisional playoffs ===
==== South: Frankfurt Galaxy 36, Cologne Centurions 6 ====
Cologne Centurions vs. Frankfurt Galaxy

Quarter	1	2	3	4	Total
Centurions	0	0	0	6	6
Galaxy	14	13	6	3	36

at PSD Bank Arena, Frankfurt, Germany

- Date: 11 September 2021
- Game time: 14:45 CEST
- Game attendance: 2,000
- Referee: K. Walentynow
- Game Book

==== North: Hamburg Sea Devils 30, Wrocław Panthers 27 ====
Wrocław Panthers vs. Hamburg Sea Devils

Quarter	1	2	3	4	Total
Panthers	7	7	0	13	27
Sea Devils	14	0	3	13	30

at Stadion Hoheluft, Hamburg, Germany

- Date: 12 September 2021
- Game time: 14:45 CEST
- Game attendance: 2,200
- Referee: Thomas Denker
- Game Book

== Championship Game ==
The inaugural Championship Game, between the North and South division champions, was played on September 26, at Merkur Spiel-Arena in Düsseldorf. In a game in which the lead changed more than once, Frankfurt, not confident enough of the quality of their placekicker, opted for two-point conversions after every single touchdown (only one out of five being successful), and not attempting a single field goal. Meanwhile, Hamburg's kicker Phillip Friis Andersen, who led the league in successful attempts during the regular season and won "Special Teams Player of the year", missed 2 FG attempts, including one from 61 yards on the last play, that could have won the game for Hamburg.

The Championship MVP trophy was won by Frankfurt QB Jakeb Sullivan, who passed for 324 yards, with 4 TD and no interceptions, and added another rushing TD.

=== Hamburg Sea Devils 30, Frankfurt Galaxy 32 ===
Hamburg Sea Devils vs. Frankfurt Galaxy

Quarter	1	2	3	4	Total
Sea Devils	7	10	10	3	30
Galaxy	0	20	0	12	32

at Merkur Spiel-Arena, Düsseldorf, Germany

- Date: 26 September 2021
- Game time: 14:45 CEST
- Game attendance: 22,000
- Referee: M. Scholz
- Game Book

== All-Star Game ==
The inaugural All-Star Game was held one week after the end of the season, on October 3 (the Day of German Unity), at Friedrich-Ludwig-Jahn-Sportpark in Berlin. It featured a selection of the best players from the ELF, playing against the United States Federation of American football All-Stars. Earlier, the league had advertised the game as the ELF all-stars playing against the United States national team.

Year	Home		Away		Venue	City	Attendance	Ref
2021	ELF All Stars	26	US Federation All Stars	8	Friedrich-Ludwig-Jahn-Sportpark	Berlin, Germany	300	

== Attendance ==
As of September 5, 2021 (Note: The attendances for Leipzig - Cologne (July 4), Hamburg - Berlin (July 11), Berlin - Wroclaw (July 18), Hamburg - Barcelona (July 31), Cologne - Wroclaw (Aug 1), Leipzig - Berlin (Aug 1), Hamburg - Wroclaw (Aug 22) and Berlin - Barcelona (Aug 22) haven't been announced)

Games without fans are not counted in averages or games played. All teams started the season with capacity restrictions, due to the COVID-19 pandemic.

Rank	Team	GP	Total	High	Low	Average
1	Wrocław Panthers	5	18,000	4,500	3,000	3,600
2	Frankfurt Galaxy	5	10,600	2,800	1,500	2,120
3	Leipzig Kings	5	10,362	2,380	1,727	2,072
4	Hamburg Sea Devils	5	8,263	1,800	1,600	1,653
5	Stuttgart Surge	5	7,143	1,998	750	1,429
6	Cologne Centurions	4	4,666	2,500	333	1,167
7	Barcelona Dragons	5	5,815	1,386	775	1,163
8	Berlin Thunder	4	3,655	1,325	400	914
–	Total	38	68,504	4,500	333	1,803

== Awards ==
=== MVP of the Week ===
Week	Player	Position	Team	Stat	Source
1	Lukas O'Connor (United States)	QB	Wrocław Panthers	27/38, 302 Yds, 4 TD, 0 Int	1
2	Madre London (United States)	RB	Cologne Centurions	352 Yds, 4 TD	2
3	Seantavius Jones (United States)	WR	Berlin Thunder	9 Rec, 155 Yds, 3 TD	3
4	Jakeb Sullivan (United States)	QB	Frankfurt Galaxy	18/25, 270 Yds, 5 TD, 0 Int	4
5	Justin Rogers (United States)	CB	Hamburg Sea Devils	2 Punt return TD, 1 Int	5
6	Jean Constant (United States)	WR	Barcelona Dragons	10 Rec, 164 Yds, 3 TD	6
7	Madre London (United States) (2)	RB	Cologne Centurions	320 Yds, 4 TD	7
8	Zack Edwards (United States)	QB	Barcelona Dragons	20/45, 454 Yds, 4 TD, 0 Int, 2 Rush TD	8
9	Joshua Poznanski (Germany)	DB	Frankfurt Galaxy	2 Int, 2 return TD, 93 return Yds, 4 Tackles	9
10	Michael Birdsong (United States)	QB	Leipzig Kings	16/25, 189 Yds, 5 TD, 0 Int	10
11	Madre London (United States) (3)	RB	Cologne Centurions	154 Yds, 1 Rush TD, 1 Rec TD	11
12	Moritz Johannknecht (Germany)	QB	Frankfurt Galaxy	23/31, 255 Yds, 4 TD, 0 Int, 1 Rush TD	12

=== Honors for the season ===
On 1. October 2021 the "ELF Honors" were presented at RCADIA Hotel in Hamburg. The following players received the awards mentioned below:

- Most Valuable Player: Madre London, Running back, Cologne Centurions
- Offensive Player of the Year: Jakeb Sullivan, Quarterback, Frankfurt Galaxy
- Defensive Player of the Year: Kyle Kitchens, Defensive End, Leipzig Kings
- Special Teams Player of the Year: Phillip Friis Andersen, Kicker / Punter, Hamburg Sea Devils
- Rookie of the Year: Louis Geyer, Wide Receiver, Stuttgart Surge
- Coach of the Year: Thomas Kösling, Head coach, Frankfurt Galaxy
- Offensive Rookie of the Year: Gerald Ameln, Running back, Frankfurt Galaxy
- Defensive Rookie of the Year: Marcel Dabo, Cornerback, Stuttgart Surge
- Assistant Coach of the Year: Kendral Ellison, Defensive Coordinator, Hamburg Sea Devils
- Man of Honor: Jan Weinreich, Quarterback, Cologne Centurions

== Statistical leaders ==
As of September 12, 2021

Category	Player	Position	Team	GP	Stat
Passing
Yards	Lukas O'Connor (United States)	QB	Wrocław Panthers	11	3198
Touchdowns	Lukas O'Connor (United States)	QB	Wrocław Panthers	11	28
Touchdowns	Jakeb Sullivan (United States)	QB	Frankfurt Galaxy	10	28
Completions	Lukas O'Connor (United States)	QB	Wrocław Panthers	11	259
Completion percentage	Jakeb Sullivan (United States)	QB	Frankfurt Galaxy	10	66.5%
Rushing
Yards	Madre London (United States)	RB	Cologne Centurions	10	2177
Touchdowns	Madre London (United States)	RB	Cologne Centurions	10	23
Yards per attempt	Madre London (United States)	RB	Cologne Centurions	10	7.2
Receiving
Yards	Jean Constant (United States)	WR	Barcelona Dragons	10	1038
Touchdowns	Seantavius Jones (United States)	WR	Berlin Thunder	10	12
Touchdowns	Timothy Knüttel (Germany)	WR	Leipzig Kings	10	12
Receptions	Jean Constant (United States)	WR	Barcelona Dragons	10	74
Yards per reception	Seantavius Jones (United States)	WR	Berlin Thunder	10	16.9
Defensive
Sacks	Kyle Kitchens (United States)	LB	Leipzig Kings	10	12.5
Tackles	Wael Nasri (France)	LB	Berlin Thunder	10	141
Interceptions	Joshua Poznanski (Germany)	DB	Frankfurt Galaxy	11	5
Interceptions	Andy Vera (Spain)	DB	Barcelona Dragons	8	5
Interceptions	Justin Rogers (United States)	DB	Hamburg Sea Devils	11	5

== Signees to other professional leagues ==
The following players invited to the NFL's International Combine, assigned to NFL's International Player Pathway Program (IPPP), signed or drafted by CFL team or signed with USFL team following their involvement with The ELF in 2021:

=== NFL ===
Player	Position	ELF team	NFL team
Aslan Zetterberg	DL	Leipzig Kings	International Combine
Jan-Philipp Bombek	DL	Hamburg Sea Devils	International Combine
Adedayo Odeleye	DL	Berlin Thunder	Houston Texans (IPPP)
Jai-Albert Jackson	DL	Stuttgart Surge	International Combine
Lance Leota	DL	Leipzig Kings	International Combine
Wael Nasri	LB	Berlin Thunder	International Combine
Marcel Dabo	DB	Stuttgart Surge	Indianapolis Colts (IPPP)
Yoshihito Omi	WR	Leipzig Kings	International Combine
Fabian Kratz	OL	Cologne Centurions	International Combine
Jan-Hendrik Hoffmeyer	OL	Frankfurt Galaxy	International Combine
Yannic Kiehl	OL	Frankfurt Galaxy	International Combine
Max Bruder	OL	Leipzig Kings	International Combine
John-Levi Kruse	TE	Hamburg Sea Devils	International Combine
Igor Mašlanka	TE	Panthers Wrocław	International Combine

=== CFL ===
The following players signed with a CFL team:

Player	Position	ELF team	CFL team
Anthony Mahoungou	WR	Frankfurt Galaxy	Ottawa Redblacks
Keanu Ebanks	OL	Panthers Wrocław	Calgary Stampeders
Seantavius Jones	WR	Leipzig Kings	Ottawa Redblacks

The following players got drafted in the CFL's Global draft:

Player	Position	ELF team	CFL team	Pick
Karlis Brauns	DL	Panthers Wrocław	BC Lions	3
Marcel Dabo	DB	Stuttgart Surge	BC Lions	16
John-Levi Kruse	FB	Hamburg Sea Devils	BC Lions	21
Otavio Amorim	OL	Berlin Thunder	Toronto Argonauts	22

=== USFL ===
Player	Position	ELF team	USFL team
Madre London	RB	Cologne Centurions	Pittsburgh Maulers
Kolin Hill	DE	Berlin Thunder	New Jersey Generals
KaVontae Turpin	WR	Panthers Wrocław	New Jersey Generals
Dartez Jacobs	S	Cologne Centurions	New Orleans Breakers
Dale Warren	LB	Stuttgart Surge	Pittsburgh Maulers

== Broadcasting ==
Region	Broadcaster
Germany	ProSieben MaxxranSport More Than Sports TV
Spain	Esport3
Worldwide	ELF Gamepass
