= Südstadion =

Football stadium in Cologne, Germany

Coordinates: 50.9175°N 6.9436°E

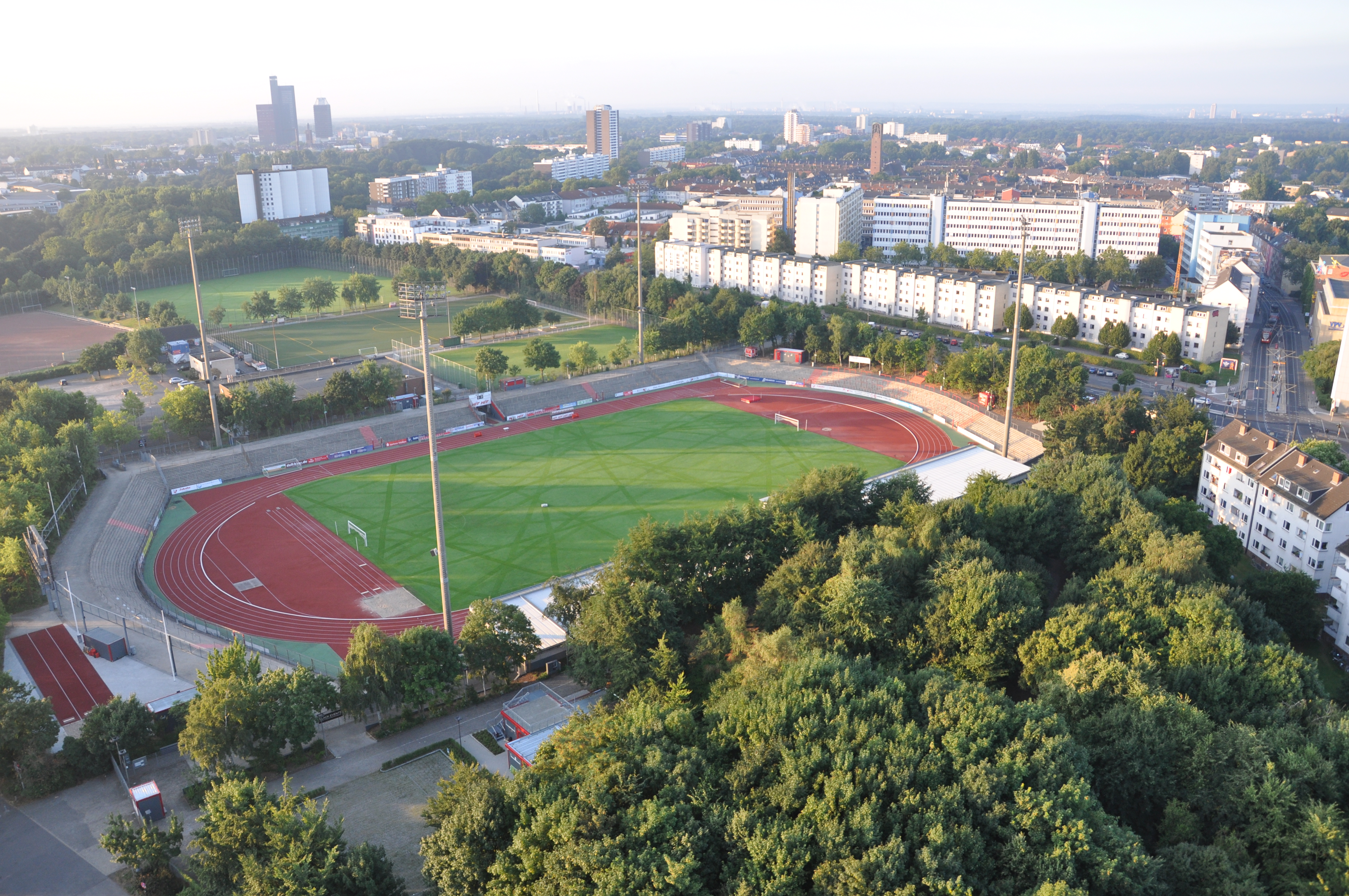
- Interactive map of Südstadion
- Location: Cologne, Germany
- Owner: Kölner Sportstätten GmbH
- Capacity: 11,748
- Surface: Grass
- Field size: 105 x 68

Construction
- Groundbreaking: 1978
- Opened: 1979
- Renovated: 2012, 2014

Tenants
- SC Fortuna Köln; Cologne Centurions (ELF) (2021–2023)

Südstadion is a football stadium in Cologne, Germany with an 11,748 capacity including 1,863 covered seats.

== History ==
The stadium was built in 1978 and renovated in 2012, adding a new stand roof, new floodlights, new sounds system, sanitary installations and also ticket booths. After SC Fortuna Köln promotion to 3. Liga, in 2014 it was renovated again by adding a partition between home and away fans, new emergency doors, wavebreakers, a video surveillance system and improvement of the security services. A plan to further renovate the stadium was projected for 2015.

== Other uses ==
SC Fortuna Köln use this stadium for their home games. Cologne Falcons and 1. FC Köln II also use it sometimes for their home games.

Beginning with the inaugural season of the new European League of Football the Cologne Centurions (ELF) played all their home games at the stadium, with two exceptions using the Cologne Ostkampfbahn.
