= Ted Daisher =

American football coach (born 1955)

Profile
- Position: Head coach

Personal information
- Born: February 2, 1955 (age 71); Taylor, Michigan

Career information
- College: Western Michigan

Career history
- Kalamazoo Christian High School (1978) Running backs & defensive backs coach; University of Illinois (1979) Graduate assistant/defensive backs; Northern Illinois University (1980–1984) Wide receivers (1980–1981), Defensive line (1982–1984) Special teams coordinator (1984); Eastern Michigan (1985–1988) Outside linebackers coach; Cincinnati (1989–1992) Defensive line coach; Fenwick HS (1993–1994) Head football coach; Army (1995–1997) Defensive line coach; Indiana (1998–2000) Defensive line coach; East Carolina (2001–2002) Outside linebackers coach; East Mecklenburg HS (2003–2004) Head football coach; Philadelphia Eagles (2004–2005) Special teams quality control coach Assistant defensive line coach; Oakland Raiders (2006) Special teams coordinator; Cleveland Browns (2007–2008) Special teams coordinator; Philadelphia Eagles (2009) Special teams coordinator; Hartford Colonials (2010) Defensive line coach; Bryant (2011) Defensive backs, special Teams; UMass (2012–2014) Safeties; Alabama State Hornets (2015–2017) Co-defensive coordinator, linebackers, defensive Line; Walsh (2017–2020) Inside linebackers coach; Hamburg Sea Devils (ELF) (2021) Head coach

Ted Daisher (born February 2, 1955) is an American football coach who lastly was head coach of the Hamburg Sea Devils (ELF), of the newly formed ELF, but released on the 6th of June, 2021. Daisher had several stops in the professional ranks. He was the defensive line coach for the Hartford Colonials in the United Football League, and was the special teams coordinator for three different National Football League teams, the Philadelphia Eagles, Cleveland Browns, and Oakland Raiders.
