= United Football League Players Association =

U.S. labor union

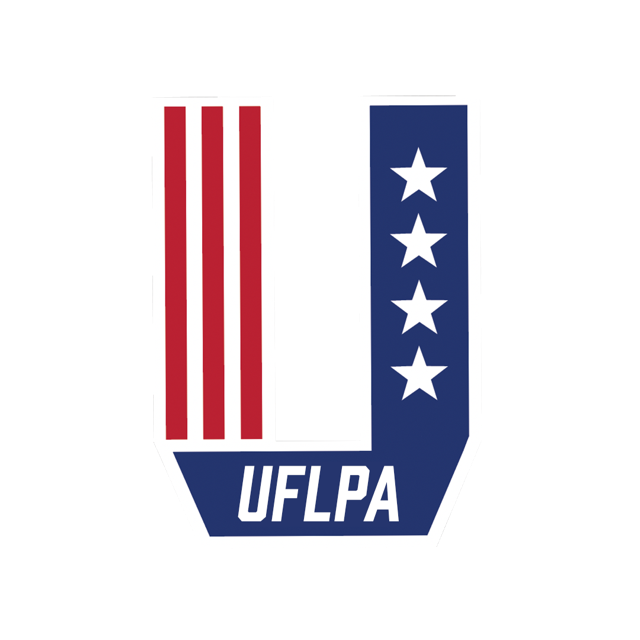
- Abbreviation: UFLPA
- Founded: 2022
- Dissolved: 2024
- Type: Labor union
- Legal status: 501(c)(5) organization
- Headquarters: Atlanta, Georgia, U.S.
- Location: United States
- Members: 400 (player members in bargaining unit) (2023)
- Key people: Dartez Jacobs (President); Devin Gray (Vice President); Kristjan Sokoli (Local Union Representative); Vad Lee (Local Union Representative); Jonathan Newsome (Local Union Representative)
- Affiliations: United Steelworkers

The United Football League Players Association (UFLPA) , or "USW Local 9004", was a local union representing United States Football League (USFL) and United Football League (UFL) players. USW Local 9004 was the first local to be issued a charter by United Steelworkers for representation in a professional sports league. The UFLPA (Local 9004), which had headquarters in Atlanta, Georgia was established to ensure protection of player rights, establish fair working conditions for active members, and provide players with formal representation to negotiate the terms of a collective bargaining agreement (CBA). The players' union was adopted following the merger of the latest incarnations of the XFL and United States Football League (USFL). The United Football League (UFL) recognized the UFLPA (Local 9004) alongside United Steelworkers as the exclusive bargaining representative of UFL players. The adopted USFL - USW collective bargaining agreement (CBA) was renegotiated to ensure continuity of labor relations between the league and players, as the merger officially transitions two eight-team leagues into one eight-team league for the 2024 season.

== Organizing History ==
The former USFLPA welcomed a petition filed by the United Steelworkers to represent all USFL players, including those suspended, on the injured reserve, or physically unable to perform list. In an election conducted by the National Labor Relations Board, on June 6, 2022, USFL players voted in favor of union representation. The USFLPA was initially formed due to an affiliation between the United Steelworkers and pro football players advocacy group United Football Players Association. The United Steelworkers terminated this agreement before the USFL-XFL league merger would commence. The former USFL players' union (USW Local 9004) would be adopted by the newly formed United Football League (UFL) to merge both former XFL and USFL players under one union, the UFLPA (Local 9004). For the inaugural season, the UFL became the first spring football league to have players represented by an established labor union at the start of league operation.

== Collective Bargaining Agreements ==
=== First CBA (2023) ===
After tentatively agreeing to terms in December 2022, on January 9, 2023, union-represented players and USFL signed the first-ever collective bargaining agreement (CBA) covering USFL players for the 2023 season to the 2024 season inclusively. The ratified agreement increased minimum salaries for active and inactive players, provided a weekly housing stipend, established 401(k) contributions from USFL, and guaranteed health insurance benefits. In addition, the CBA provides enhanced medical provisions and a guaranteed injured reserve clause.

=== Union Recognition and CBA Adoption (2024) ===
The United Football League (UFL) adopted the collective bargaining agreement (CBA) between the United States Football League (USFL) and the United Steelworkers as modified by the Memorandum of Agreement entered into by the USFL and USW on January 3, 2024. The renegotiated CBA will now cover UFL players for the 2024 season inclusively.

== Union Leadership ==
The president of the UFLPA was Dartez Jacobs and the Vice President was Devin Gray. As of 2023, the executive committee consisted of the following UFL player representatives: Kristjan Sokoli, Jonathan Newsome, Vad Lee, Boogie Roberts, Chris Rowland, Brandon Wright, Bo Scarbrough, and Josh Love. UFLPA (Local 9004) officers were responsible for overseeing the business affairs of the local union, negotiating terms of the CBA, securing amendments to enforce player protection, and protecting the image of players and their profession.

== See also ==
- National Football League Players Association
- Canadian Football League Players' Association
