= Kasim Edebali =

German-American football player (born 1989)

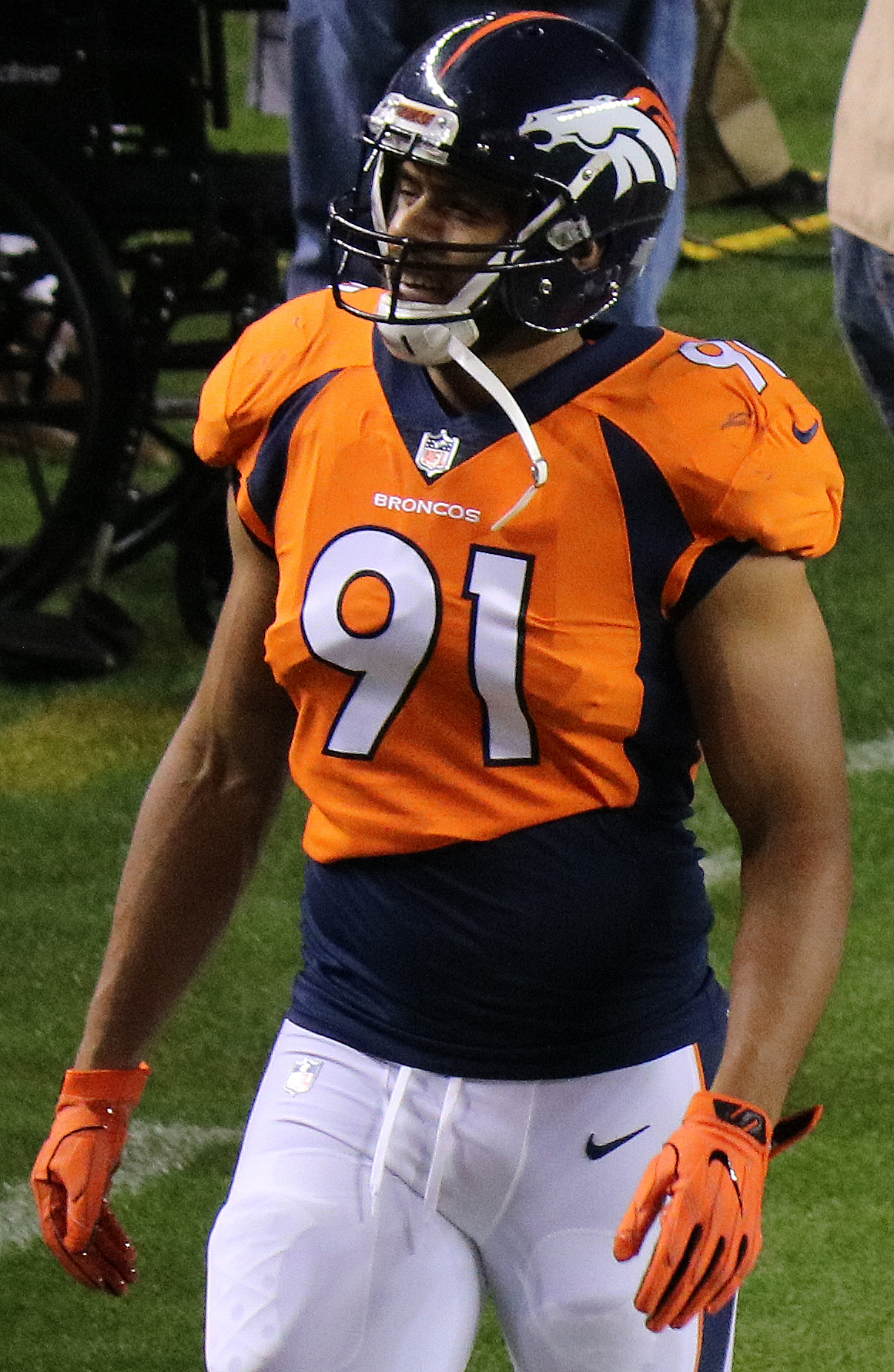
- Edebali with the Denver Broncos in 2017

No. 91, 96, 95
- Position: Defensive end

Personal information
- Born: August 17, 1989 (age 37); Hamburg, Germany
- Listed height: 6 ft 3 in (1.91 m)
- Listed weight: 250 lb (113 kg)

Career information
- High school: Kimball Union Academy (Meriden, New Hampshire, U.S.)
- College: Boston College
- NFL draft: 2014: undrafted

Career history
- New Orleans Saints (2014–2016); Denver Broncos (2017); Detroit Lions (2017); Los Angeles Rams (2017); New Orleans Saints (2017); Chicago Bears (2018)*; Cincinnati Bengals (2018); Philadelphia Eagles (2019)*; Oakland Raiders (2019); Hamburg Sea Devils (2021–2022)
- * Offseason or practice squad member only

Awards and highlights
- Second-team All-ELF (2022)

Career NFL statistics
- Total tackles: 55
- Sacks: 8.0
- Forced fumbles: 1
- Fumble recoveries: 1
- Stats at Pro Football Reference

Kasim Edebali (born August 17, 1989) is a German-American former professional football defensive end. He played college football at Boston College and was signed by the New Orleans Saints as an undrafted free agent in 2014. Edebali is Cameron Jordan's brother-in-law.

== Early life ==
Edebali, the son of Petty Officer 2nd Class Jonathan Stradford, and Turkish mother, Nesrin Edebali, grew up in Hamburg, Germany and played for the Hamburg Huskies. At age 18, he was recruited to play college football in Meriden, New Hampshire, where he attended Kimball Union Academy as part of the USA Football International Student Program, and played high school football for two years. He attended Boston College where he redshirted his Freshman year and went on to earn a bachelor's degree in Communications and Germanic studies in May 2013. As a defensive end for the Eagles, he was a co-captain and earned All-ACC second-team honors as a senior.

== College career ==
Edebali played 49 games for the Boston College Eagles, recording 166 tackles (88 solo), 11 sacks, 24.5 tackles for a loss, 15 pass defenses, four forced fumbles, and three fumble recoveries. As a senior, started all 13 games, recording 67 tackles (36 solo), 9.5 sacks, 15 tackles for a loss, three forced fumbles, two fumble recoveries and five passes defensed and was named All-Atlantic Coast Conference second-team by the league’s coaches as well as All-ACC third-team honors from the media. Edebali was a co-captain his senior year.

== Professional career ==
=== New Orleans Saints (first stint) ===
On May 12, 2014, the New Orleans Saints signed Edebali as an undrafted free agent. He earned a spot on the roster based on his pass-rushing and special teams abilities during preseason. Edebali earned his first two career tackles against the Dallas Cowboys on September 28, 2014. On October 27, 2014, Edebali notched his first two sacks along with a forced fumble in the Saints' victory against the Green Bay Packers. Edebali finished his rookie season with the New Orleans Saints recording a total of 22 tackles (15 solo). He also recorded two sacks, and one forced fumble.

=== Denver Broncos ===
On March 13, 2017, Edebali signed a one-year contract with the Denver Broncos. He was waived by the Broncos on November 14, 2017.

=== Detroit Lions ===
On November 15, 2017, Edebali was claimed off waivers by the Detroit Lions. He was waived by the Lions on December 13, 2017.

=== Los Angeles Rams ===
On December 20, 2017, Edebali signed with the Los Angeles Rams, but was released a week later.

=== New Orleans Saints (second stint) ===
On December 28, 2017, Edebali was claimed off waivers by the Saints.

=== Chicago Bears ===
On June 7, 2018, Edebali signed with the Chicago Bears. He was released on September 1, 2018.

=== Cincinnati Bengals ===
On November 20, 2018, Edebali was signed by the Cincinnati Bengals.

=== Philadelphia Eagles ===
On August 6, 2019, Edebali was signed by the Philadelphia Eagles. He was released during final roster cuts on August 30, 2019.

=== Oakland Raiders ===
On October 22, 2019, Edebali was signed by the Oakland Raiders, but was released eight days later.

=== Career accomplishments ===
With 8.0 total career sacks Edebali is the all time German sacks leader in the NFL, topping former Indianapolis Colts defensive end and first round draft pick Bjoern Werner by 1.5 sacks.

=== Hamburg Sea Devils ===
In 2021, the Hamburg Sea Devils (named after the mostly unrelated NFL-Europe team) franchise of the new European League of Football, a venture founded by fellow Hamburgian and personal friend of Kasim Edebali Patrick Esume announced that Edebali would be playing for them in the upcoming 2021 ELF season. Edebali extended his contract for another year with the Sea Devils on March 24, 2022.
