= Moubarak Djeri =

Togolese American football player (born 1995)

No. 91 – Frankfurt Galaxy (ELF)
- Position: Defensive end
- Roster status: active

Personal information
- Born: December 30, 1995 (age 30); Togo
- Listed height: 6 ft 3 in (1.91 m)
- Listed weight: 275 lb (125 kg)

Career information
- NFL draft: 2018: undrafted

Career history
- Cologne Crocodiles (2014–2017); Arizona Cardinals (2018)*; Frankfurt Galaxy (2023–present)
- * Offseason or practice squad member only
- Stats at Pro Football Reference

Abdoul Moubarak Djeri (born December 30, 1995) is a Togolese American football defensive end who is currently playing for the Frankfurt Galaxy. He played in the German Football League for the Cologne Crocodiles.

== Early life ==
Djeri was born in Togo in West Africa and moved to Germany in 2007.

== Professional career ==
=== Cologne Crocodiles ===
Djeri played for the Cologne Crocodiles from 2014 to 2017 with his final year recording 12 sacks, 40 tackles, 10 tackles for loss and two forced fumbles.

=== Arizona Cardinals ===
On March 28, 2018, Djeri signed a one-year contract with the Arizona Cardinals. On July 27, 2018, Djeri was cut from the Cardinals.

=== Frankfurt Galaxy ===
In January 2023, Djeri signed with the Frankfurt Galaxy ahead of the 2023 European League of Football season.
