= Charles Jones (American football coach) =

American football player

Charles "Yogi" Jones
Personal information
- Born: 1960 or 1961 (age 65–66)
- Listed height: 6 ft 1 in (1.85 m)
- Listed weight: 235 lb (107 kg)

Career information
- High school: Ringgold (Carroll Township, Pennsylvania)
- College: Pittsburgh
- NFL draft: 1983: undrafted

Career history

Playing
- Dallas Cowboys (1983)*
- * Offseason or practice squad member only

Coaching
- Frankfurt Galaxy; Hamburg Sea Devils; Cleveland Browns (Player personnel); Bethune–Cookman Wildcats football (DC/assist. head coach); Hamburg Sea Devils (ELF) (2022–2023) Head coach

Charles "Yogi" Jones is an American former football linebacker who played professionally in the National Football League (NFL) for the Dallas Cowboys. He played college football at University of Pittsburgh.

== Early years ==
Jones arrived as a freshman at Pitt in 1978. He played his last game as a fifth-year-senior tri-captain for the No. 1-ranked University of Pittsburgh team in 1982.

== Professional career ==
Charles "Yogi" Jones signed 1983 as an undrafted rookie with the Dallas Cowboys. He was injured after preseason games and in training camp, forcing him to end his professional career.

== Coaching career ==
After his professional player career he was engaged in several coaching positions. Starting as a Graduate Assistant at The University of Pittsburgh and went on to become the first Full-time African-American Coach at James Madison University where in 1987 the school qualified for the National Playoffs with a 9-2 Record. Jones went on to coach at Rutgers, Pitt, and Tulane Universities Before accepting Defensive positions in multiple NFL Europe Cities such as Frankfurt Germany (‘99 World Bowl Champions) Glasgow Scotland, Berlin Germany Hamburg (2007 World Bowl Champions). After NFLE Jones Invested 2 Seasons with the Cleveland Browns in as a college and Pro Personnel scout. After NFL Europe Jones went on to become the Assistant Head Coach/Def coordinator at Bethune Cookman University for the next 12 seasons which included 6 MEAC CHAMPIONSHIPS 2 HBCU NATIONAL CHAMPIONSHIPS, Nationally Ranked Defenses and 2 Victories over FBS Universities. After his tenure at BCU in February 2022, Jones was officially announced as the new head coach of the Hamburg Sea Devils in the European League of Football.

== Personal life ==
He is married and has two children.
