= Cologne Centurions (ELF) =

Professional American football team in Germany

- Logo
- Uniforms

General information
- Founded: 2021
- Folded: 2025
- Headquartered: Cologne, Germany
- Colors: Red, white, grey, black

Personnel
- Owner: Senad Mecavica (2025)
- Head coach: Javan Lenhardt

Home fields
- Südstadion

League / conference affiliations
- European League of Football (2021–2025): South Division (2021); Southern Conference (2022); Western Conference (2023–2024); South Division (2025)

Playoff appearances (1)
- 2021

The Cologne Centurions were an American football team based in Cologne, Germany, that played in the European League of Football (ELF) from 2021 to 2025.

== History ==
In March 2021, it was announced that a new franchise in Cologne is one of the eight teams to play in the inaugural season of the European League of Football. The team would be named Cologne Centurions, taking the identity of the former NFL Europe team, after the league reached an agreement with the NFL for the naming rights.

The team finished the inaugural regular season in second place in the Southern Division with five wins and five losses, led by running back and MVP Madre London and German quarterback Jan Weinreich. The Centurions lost the semi-final in the playoffs against Frankfurt Galaxy. Head coach for the first season was Kirk Heidelberg.

In the second season, Frank Roser took over the position of head coach. In early April 2022, Madre London moved to the Pittsburgh Maulers in the newly founded USFL, despite having re-signed with the Centurions the previous September. The Centurions started the season with two wins, but then nine consecutive defeats. The team finished the regular season in third place in the Southern Conference.

Kahlil Carter was announced as head coach in October 2022. However, in March 2023, Carter resigned and was succeeded by Christos Lambropoulos. The Centurions could not win a game inside the strong Western Conference but had two wins in interconference games versus Prague Lions, as well as two walkover wins after the withdrawal of the Leipzig Kings.

In early October 2023, the Centurions announced that they would not renew the contract of sports director David Drane. Christoph Lörcks became the new general manager in November 2023. New head coach was former college coach Gregg Brandon. However, after week 7, Brandon left the team for health reasons, and offensive coordinator Jag Bal took over. As the stadiums in Cologne were not available during the UEFA Euro 2024, the Centurions played the first four home games at the Tivoli stadium in nearby Aachen. With the exception of the first game against Rhein Fire (8558 spectators), the audience was disappointing. The remaining two home games took place in the Cologne Südstadion. With a 6-6 record, the Centurions could surprise, and finished the Western Conference on rank 4.

In the offseason 2024-25, the team went to radio silence. In March 2025 the operating company underwent insolvency, without public knowledge. The team was taken over by a new company, owned by Senad Mecavica and Kevin Tewe, with latter withdrewing before the start of the season. The team returned to the Südstadion. New head coach was Javan Lenhardt. Due to a late start of roster planning, many previous players had already signed with other teams, and the Centurions signed a lot players from lower local leagues. The team lost all games with a high margin, resulting in a total point differential of –670 in 12 games. Audience number fell below 1000. For the last game in Innsbruck, some players of the opposing Raiders Tirol dressed for the Centurions such that the game could take place.

After the 2025 season, eleven teams announced they were leaving the ELF to form the European Football Alliance, though the Centurions were not among them. While the league initially tried to restructure itself as part of self-administration proceedings so as to continue with a 2026 season, the European League of Football underwent insolvency, and the Centurions folded.

== Stadium ==
The Centurions are playing their home games at Südstadion in Cologne. Südstadion is home filed of the soccer club SC Fortuna Köln, and has a capacity of 11,748, but only 1863 covered seats. In 2021, two home games were played in the Ostkampfbahn near the RheinEnergieStadion. In 2023, two home games took place in Sportpark Höhenberg. In the 2024 season, Cologne had to move to Tivoli stadium in nearby Aachen for four home games during UEFA Euro 2024

== Season-by-season record ==
Season	Head coach	Regular season					Postseason				Average Attendance
Season	Head coach	GP	W	L	Win %	Pos.	GP	W	L	Result	Average Attendance
2021	Kirk Heidelberg	10	5	5	.500	2nd (South)	1	0	1	Loss semifinal	1,167
2022	Frank Roser	12	3	9	.250	3rd (South)	DNQ				1,843
2023	Christos Lambropoulos	12	4	8	.333	5th (Western)	DNQ				2,773
2024	Gregg Brandon/Jag Bal	12	6	6	.500	4th (Western)	DNQ				2,824
2025	Javan Lenhardt	12	0	12	.000	4th (West)	DNQ				770
Sum		58	18	40	0.259	-	1	0	1		1,808

== See also ==
- Category:Cologne Centurions (ELF) seasons
