= Hamburg Sea Devils (ELF) =

Professional American football team in Germany

- Current season
Logo

General information
- Founded: November 4, 2021
- Folded: 2026
- Headquartered: Hamburg, Germany
- Colors: Navy Blue, blue, red, white

Personnel
- Owners: SEH Sports & Entertainment Holding GmbH
- General manager: Mark Weitz
- Head coach: Lee Rowland

Team history
- Hamburg Sea Devils (2021–2025)

Home fields
- Stadion Hoheluft (2021–2025)

League / conference affiliations
- European League of Football (2021–2025): North Division (2021); Northern Conference (2022); Western Conference (2023–2024); North Division (2025)

Championships
- Conference championships: 1 Northern: 2022
- Division championships: 1 North: 2021

Playoff appearances (2)
- 2021, 2022

The Hamburg Sea Devils were an American football team based in Hamburg, Germany. The Sea Devils competed in the European League of Football (ELF) as a member of the North Division. The team played its home games at Stadion Hoheluft. They played the ELF Championship Games 2021 and 2022, losing both games.

== History ==
The Hamburg franchise was announced in November 2020, as part of the inaugural season of the European League of Football. In March 2021, ELF announced it has reached an agreement with the NFL, to be able to use the team names from the days of NFL Europe. On the same day, it was announced Hamburg will use the name of the defunct NFL Europe franchise Hamburg Sea Devils. The Sea Devils also introduced their new head coach, former special teams coach for multiple NFL teams, Ted Daisher. However, he ended up being released only 3 weeks into the inaugural season, because of "different views and expectations regarding the philosophy and leadership of our team". He was replaced by offensive coordinator Andreas Nommensen. The Sea Devils secured the first place in the Division North with seven wins and three defeats. With a 30:27 victory against the Panthers Wrocław in the semi-finals, they secured their way into the first ELF Championship Game. They faced the Frankfurt Galaxy. In a close game until the end, they lost with 30-32.

For the 2022 season, they signed Charles Jones as head coach. Jones had already coached for the old Sea Devils. From July 2022 until the end of the season, former NFL coach and coordinator John Shoop worked as a consultant for the team. Shoop was a coach for various positions on the offensive side until 2015 and among others with the Oakland Raiders Offensive Coordinator. The Sea Devils started the season with a victory over the Berlin Thunder and a defeat against the Barcelona Dragons. From week three, the team had a winning streak of ten games, defended the Northern Conference title and became the best team of the regular season. In the semi-finals in front of the local crowd, the Raiders Tirol were kept at bay with 19-7. In the ELF Championship Game against the Vienna Vikings, the Sea Devils lost with 15-27 in their second ELF championship game.

Jones was extended as head coach for the 2023 season. American Preston Haire was signed as quarterback. With Kasim Edebali and Miguel Boock, two well-known linebackers ended their careers after the 2022 season. On June 11, 2023, Sea Devils played their first home game in Volksparkstadion in front of 32,500 spectators. The Sea Devils lost 22-27. With a 4-8 record, the Sea Devils missed the playoffs for the first time.

After the end of the regular season, the Sea Devils announced the dismissal of Charles Jones as head coach. In addition, defensive coordinator Kendral Ellison joined the Munich Ravens as the new head coach and general manager Max Paatz joined Rhein Fire. For the 2024 season, the American Matt Johnson was hired as head coach, and Brandon Noble as defensive coordinator. The Sea Devils signed Javarian Smith as quarterback and Jarvis McClam as wide receiver. After week 7, Smith was replaced by American D'Angelo Fulfort. The Sea Devils did not play at Stadion Hoheluft this season but opted to play in several cities across Northern Germany. The team finished the season with a 2-10 record.

In September 2024, the team introduced Shuan Fatah as the new head coach. Previously, Fatah won two German and five Austrian Bowls and worked for the Sea Devils of the NFL Europe as a running back coach.

Following the conclusion of the 2025 ELF season, eleven teams announced they were leaving the ELF to form the European Football Alliance, with the Sea Devils noticeably not included among them. While the league initially tried to restructure itself as part of self-administration proceedings so as to continue with a 2026 season, on 23 March 2026, insolvency proceedings were initiated against the European League of Football. With the league shut down, the Sea Devils effectively ceased operations, though no formal statement was released by the franchise.

=== Season-by-season ===
Name	Coach	Regular season					Postseason				Result	Ø Attendance
Name	Coach	GP	Won	Lost	Win %	Finish	GP	Won	Lost	Win %	Result	Ø Attendance
2021	Ted Daisher	2	2	0	1.000	1st (North)						
2021	Andreas Nommensen	8	5	3	.625	1st (North)	2	1	1	.500	Lost 1st Championship Game	1,744
2022	Charles "Yogi" Jones	12	11	1	.916	1st (North)	2	1	1	.500	Lost 2nd Championship Game	3,520
2023	Charles "Yogi" Jones	12	4	8	.333	4th (Western)	DNQ				–	8,164
2024	Matt Johnson	12	2	10	0.167	6th (Western)	DNQ				–	9,277
2025	Lee Rowland	12	3	9	.250	3rd (North)	DNQ				-	3,183
Total		58	27	31	0.466	-	4	2	2	0.500	-	5,296

== Stadium ==
The Sea Devils primarily played their home games at the 11,000-seat capacity Stadion Hoheluft, though they would play select matches at the larger Volksparkstadion.
