= LNFA 2017 =

American football season in Spain

LNFA
- Season: 2017
- Champions: Badalona Dracs (8th title)

The 2017 LNFA season was the 23rd season of American football in Spain.

Teams were divided into three categories, named Serie A, B and C, with promotion and relegation between them.

Badalona Dracs won their eighth title, a record for the tournament.

== LNFA Serie A ==
=== Tiebreakers ===
If two or more teams are tied at the end of the competition, the ranking of teams in each group is based on the following criteria:

1. Highest percentage of wins in games between tied teams.
2. Lowest percentage of points against in games between tied teams.
3. Highest difference between points scored and points against in games between tied teams.
4. Lowest percentage of points against in all the games.
5. Highest difference between points scored and points against in all the games.
6. Lowest percentage of sent off players in all the games.
7. Drawing of lots.

=== Stadia and locations ===
Location of teams in LNFA 2017 Serie A

Six teams entered the LNFA Serie A, the top-tier level of American football in Spain. Murcia Cobras promoted from the last Serie B while no team was relegated from the previous season.

As an expansion of the league to eight teams was planned, the last qualified team played also the relegation play-offs instead of being directly relegated.

Team	Location	Stadium
Badalona Dracs	Badalona	Municipal
Barberà Rookies	Barberà del Vallès	Can Llobet
Murcia Cobras	Murcia	José Barnés
Reus Imperials	Reus	Municipal Reddis
Valencia Firebats	Valencia	Jardín del Turia
Valencia Giants	Catarroja	Polideportivo

=== Regular season ===
Pos	Team	Pld	W	L	PF	PA	PD	Qualification or relegation	DRA	IMP	FIR	COB	GIA	ROO
1	Badalona Dracs	10	9	1	430	119	+311	Playoffs	—	54–6	44–14	26–7	52–0	65–3
2	Reus Imperials	10	8	2	356	292	+64	Playoffs	48–32	—	33–18	47–20	50–27	49–30
3	Valencia Firebats	10	4	6	229	307	−78	Playoffs	21–57	22–35	—	29–28	36–14	30–18
4	Murcia Cobras	10	4	6	204	218	−14	Playoffs	0–33	34–7	10–20	—	14–37	37–6
5	Valencia Giants	10	3	7	235	325	−90	Relegation playoffs	6–32	27–32	41–16	13–27	—	26–30
6	Barberà Rookies	10	2	8	206	399	−193	Relegation playoffs	14–35	28–49	34–30	7–34	36–44	—

Source: FEFA

=== Playoffs ===
Semifinals
21 May – Badalona
Badalona Dracs	21
Murcia Cobras	13
21 May – Reus
Reus Imperials	32
Valencia Firebats	28

Final
3 June – Reus
Badalona Dracs	56
Reus Imperials	14

=== Relegation playoffs ===
Team 1	Score	Team 2
Valencia Giants	11–8	Mallorca Voltors
Barberà Rookies	16–22	Rivas Osos

== LNFA Serie B ==
=== Stadia and locations ===
Location of teams in LNFA 2017 Serie B

Eight teams will play the Serie B in 2017. No teams were relegated from Serie A, while Las Rozas Black Demons, Rivas Osos and ANV Fuenlabrada Cuervos promoted from the previous season of the Serie C.

Granada Lions resigned to continue playing in the Serie B.

Team	Location	Stadium
ANV Fuenlabrada Cuervos	Fuenlabrada	Fermín Cacho
Barcelona Búfals	Barcelona	Lluís Companys
Gijón Mariners	Gijón	Las Mestas
L'Hospitalet Pioners	L'Hospitalet de Llobregat	Hospitalet Nord
Las Rozas Black Demons	Las Rozas de Madrid	El Cantizal
Mallorca Voltors	Palma	Son Moix
Rivas Osos	Rivas Vaciamadrid	Cerro del Telégrafo
Santurtzi Coyotes	Santurtzi	Mikel Trueba

=== League table ===
Pos	Grp	Team	Pld	W	L	PF	PA	PD	Qualification	BLA	PIO	MAR	COY	OSO	VOL	BUF	CUE
1	O	Las Rozas Black Demons	8	8	0	290	100	+190	Playoffs	—	19–17	50–30	65–7		48–0		
2	O	L'Hospitalet Pioners	8	5	3	185	136	+49	Playoffs	27–28	—	19–35	33–0			37–14	
3	O	Gijón Mariners	8	4	4	190	167	+23		12–14	19–22	—	27–3	0–19			
4	O	Santurtzi Coyotes	7	1	6	106	184	−78		0–13	3–7	19–33	—				TBD
1	E	Rivas Osos	8	6	2	260	70	+190	Playoffs			21–34		—	12–14	34–0	76–0
2	E	Mallorca Voltors	8	4	4	177	172	+5	Playoffs	7–53				14–28	—	13–12	53–0
3	E	Barcelona Búfals	8	3	5	210	142	+68			18–23			8–20	19–15	—	66–0
4	E	ANV Fuenlabrada Cuervos	7	0	7	6	453	−447					6–74	0–50	0–61 (Note: Both teams agreed to end the match before finishing the fourth quarter.)	0–73	—

Updated to match(es) played on 30 April 2017. Source: Serie B at FieldGoal

=== Promotion playoffs ===
As the Serie A would be expanded to eight teams for the next season, the two winners of the semifinals both were directly promoted while the two losers would play a serie against the fifth and the sixth qualified teams of the Serie A.

Semifinals
Las Rozas
Las Rozas Black Demons	49
Mallorca Voltors	0
Rivas-Vaciamadrid
Rivas Osos	10
L'Hospitalet Pioners	14

Final
27 May – Las Rozas
Las Rozas Black Demons	41
L'Hospitalet Pioners	27

== LNFA Serie C ==
=== Andalusian League ===
Pos	Team	Pld	W	L	PF	PA	PD	Qualification	POT	LIO	BAR	BLU	LIN	GOL
1	Fuengirola Potros	6	6	0	309	45	+264	Qualification to playoffs	—	54–20	28–13		58–0	
2	Granada Lions	6	4	2	205	130	+75	Qualification to playoffs		—	28–20	19–22		51–12
3	Almería Barbarians	6	4	2	195	75	+120	Qualification to playoffs			—	30–13	56–0	34–0
4	Aljarafe Blue Devils	6	3	3	156	110	+46	Qualification to playoffs	12–36	22–25		—		41–0
5	Sevilla Linces	6	1	5	26	290	−264		0–54	0–62		0–46	—	
6	Córdoba Golden Bulls	6	0	6	32	273	−241		0–79		6–42		14–26	—

Source: FAFA and FAFA

==== Playoffs ====
Semifinals
29 April
Fuengirola Potros	74
Aljarafe Blue Devils	0
29 April
Granada Lions	20
Almería Barbarians	8

Final
14 May
Fuengirola Potros	52
Granada Lions	23

=== Catalan league ===
==== Regular season ====
Pos	Team	Pld	W	L	PF	PA	PD	Qualification	FAL	RED	BOC	URO	LEG	EAG	PAG	ALM
1	Salt Falcons/Senglars	7	7	0	252	43	+209	Qualification to playoffs	—	21–18	—	19–6	—	61–0	55–0	—
2	Terrassa Reds	7	6	1	251	60	+191	Qualification to playoffs	—	—	—	19–6	41–12	44–0	—	47–0
3	Argentona Bocs	7	4	3	242	84	+158	Qualification to playoffs	6–14	21–41	—	—	—	54–0	48–7	—
4	Barcelona Uroloki	7	4	3	137	76	+61	Qualification to playoffs	—	—	19–10	—	19–28	—	—	14–0
5	Torrelles Legends	7	4	3	168	164	+4		6–20	—	0–56	—	—	—	54–14	—
6	Vilafranca Eagles	7	2	5	64	262	−198		—	—	—	0–38	14–32	—	—	20–13
7	Barcelona Pagesos	7	1	6	55	269	−214		—	0–41	—	0–35	—	20–30	—	—
8	Salou Almogàvers	7	0	7	29	240	−211		7–62	—	3–47	—	0–36	—	6–14	—

Source: FCFA, FCFA

==== Playoffs ====
Semifinals
Salt Falcons/Senglars	28
Barcelona Uroloki	6
Terrassa Reds	3
Argentona Bocs	9

Final
Salt Falcons/Senglars	7
Argentona Bocs	22

=== Madrilenian league ===
Pos	Team	Pld	W	L	PF	PA	PD	CAM	CAP	TOR	WIL	SMI	JAB	OSO	STI
1	Camioneros de Coslada	7	7	0	283	34	+249	—	51–0	—	49–17	45–0	46–0	—	—
2	Madrid Capitals	7	6	1	215	152	+63	—	—	20–12	48–32	—	36–14	—	49–0
3	Toros de Madrid	7	4	3	177	115	+62	17–43	—	—	13–7	—	14–25	—	—
4	Majadahonda Wildcats	7	3	4	216	150	+66	—	—		—	13–18	—	26–7	64–0
5	Alcorcón Smilodons	7	3	4	124	161	−37	—	22–36	6–46	—	—	—	—	42–8
6	Tres Cantos Jabatos	7	3	4	141	209	−68		—	—	15–57	13–8	—	38–39	—
7	Osos de Madrid	7	2	5	134	186	−52	0–48	21–26	14–20	—	0–28	—	—	—
8	Guadalajara Stings	7	0	7	17	300	−283	0–1 (Note: Match awarded to Camioneros de Coslada as Guadalajara Guadalajara Stings did not want to play the match.)	—	0–55	—	—	9–36	0–53	—

Source: FMFA

=== Northern league ===
Pos	Team	Pld	W	L	PF	PA	PD	HUR	BIS	HOR
1	Zaragoza Hurricanes	4	4	0	133	17	+116	—	37–3	43–0
2	Cantabria Bisons	4	2	2	69	70	−1	14–27	—	21–0
3	Zaragoza Hornets	4	0	4	6	121	−115	0–26	6–31	—

Source: FEFAPA

=== Serie C League ===
Pos	Team	Pld	W	L	PF	PA	PD	SHA	MAD	DAR	PRE	EAG
1	Alicante Sharks	6	6	0	142	12	+130	—	27–0		28–0	55–0
2	Oviedo Madbulls	0	0	0	0	0	0		—			
3	Zaragoza Dark Knights	0	0	0	0	0	0	0–35		—		
4	Cartagena Pretorianos	0	0	0	0	0	0	12–37			—	
5	Almassora Eagle Rays	0	0	0	0	0	0	0–60				—

=== Playoffs ===
==== Bracket ====
Wild Card
23 April
4 Toros de Madrid	28
5 Cantabria Bisons	7

Semifinals
7 May – Alicante
1 Alicante Sharks	28
4 Toros de Madrid	13
7 May – Coslada
2 Camioneros de Coslada	38
3 Granada Lions	0

Final
21 May – Coslada
1 Alicante Sharks	0
2 Camioneros de Coslada	40
