= LNFA 2015 =

American football season in Spain

The LNFA 2015 season was the 21st season of American football in Spain. Badalona Dracs were the defending champions, but lost to Valencia Firebats in the final.

Teams were divided into three categories, named Serie A, B and C, with promotion and relegation between them.

== LNFA Serie A ==
Location of teams in LNFA 2015 Serie A

Six teams entered the LNFA Serie A, the top-tier level of American football in Spain. L'Hospitalet Pioners, Rivas Osos, Valencia Firebats, Valencia Giants and Badalona Dracs repeated from last year. Mallorca Voltors were promoted from last year LNFA Serie B.

Valencia Firebats won their fourth title. Mallorca Voltors and L'Hospitalet Pioners were relegated.

=== Regular season ===
Pos	Team	Pld	W	L	PF	PA	PD	Qualification or relegation	FIR	DRA	OSO	GIA	PIO	VOL
1	Valencia Firebats	10	9	1	403	131	+272	Playoffs	—	28–25	76–0	40–20	44–28	34–0
2	Badalona Dracs	10	7	3	332	94	+238	Playoffs	3–7	—	34–0	25–22	54–14	59–0
3	Rivas Osos	10	6 (Note: Osos ahead on head-to-head record; Osos–Giants 27–14, Giants–Osos 14–6.)	4	189	240	−51	Playoffs	29–48	17–14	—	27–14	22–15	32–6
4	Valencia Giants	10	6	4	244	153	+91	Playoffs	26–20	0–14	14–6	—	28–14	47–0
5	L'Hospitalet Pioners	10	2	8	159	296	−137	Relegation playoffs	0–47	0–48	13–26	7–19	—	41–8
6	Mallorca Voltors	10	0	10	26	439	−413	Relegated	0–59	6–56	6–30	0–54	0–27	—

Source: Serie A at FieldGoal

=== Playoffs ===
Semi-finals
June 6, Valencia
Valencia Firebats	21
Valencia Giants	6
June 7, Badalona
Badalona Dracs	42
Rivas Osos	6

Final
June 20, Badalona
Valencia Firebats	30
Badalona Dracs	20

=== Promotion/relegation playoffs ===
The fifth placed team in Serie A, L'Hospitalet Pioners, played Serie B runner-up, Barberà Rookies. Rookies won the game and will play in next year Serie A.

Team 1	Score	Team 2
L'Hospitalet Pioners	35–54	Barberà Rookies

== LNFA Serie B ==
Location of teams in LNFA 2015 Serie B
Yellow: Group Odd
Red: Group Even

Ten teams played the Serie B in 2015. Gijón Mariners and Cantabria Bisons resigned to play in the league, due to the new competition format with longer travels.

The two group winners joined directly the semifinals while the second and the third qualified teams played the quarterfinal round.

The worst qualified team was directly relegated to Serie C while the second worst one played a game against the Serie C runner-up to remain in the league.

Legend
The two group winners advanced to the semifinals
Runner-up and third qualified advanced to the quarterfinals.
The team with the second worst record would play a relegation playoff.
The team with the worst record would be relegated.

=== Group Odd ===
Pos	Team	Pld	W	L	PF	PA	PD	Qualification	IMP	COB	COY	BUF	HOR
1	Reus Imperials	8	8	0	222	51	+171	Semifinals	—	20–7	28–14	42–0	21–7
2	Murcia Cobras	8	4	4	115	117	−2	Quarterfinals	14–34	—	19–16	20–13	26–0
3	Santurtzi Coyotes	8	3 (Note: Coyotes ahead on head-to-head record; Coyotes–Búfals 38–6, Búfals–Coyotes 14–0.)	5	98	105	−7	Quarterfinals	0–19	14–7	—	38–6	8–12
4	Barcelona Búfals	8	3	5	67	157	−90		0–32	20–7	14–0	—	14–8
5	Zaragoza Hornets	8	2	6	46	118	−72	Relegation playoffs	9–26	0–15	0–8	10–0	—

Source: Serie B at FieldGoal

=== Group Even ===
Pos	Team	Pld	W	L	PF	PA	PD	Qualification	ROO	LIO	BLA	CAM	HUR
1	Barberà Rookies	8	8	0	191	75	+116	Semifinals	—	24–20	30–0	30–7	27–13
2	Granada Lions	8	5	3	229	139	+90	Quarterfinals	22–28	—	20–27	26–7	36–2
3	Las Rozas Black Demons	8	3 (Note: Black Demons ahead on head-to-head record; Black Demons–Camioneros 19–2; Camioneros–Black Demons 13–7.)	5	122	124	−2	Quarterfinals	7–21	9–17	—	19–2	12–21
4	Camioneros Coslada	8	3	5	104	121	−17		6–7	9–26	13–7	—	21–6
5	Zaragoza Hurricanes	8	1	7	75	262	−187	Relegated	0–24	33–62	0–41	0–39	—

Source: Serie B at FieldGoal

=== Promotion playoffs ===
Wild Card
May 3
Granada Lions	46
Santurtzi Coyotes	13
May 2
Murcia Cobras	14
Las Rozas Black Demons	27

Semifinals
May 16
Reus Imperials	48
Granada Lions	7
May 17
Barberà Rookies	28
Las Rozas Black Demons	21

Final
May 31
Reus Imperials	24
Barberà Rookies	20

== LNFA Serie C ==
The new Serie C was composed by the Regional and interregional leagues. The top 8 teams could qualify to the promotion playoffs, but finally only six teams signed up for the playoffs.

=== Andalusian League ===
Pos	Team	Pld	W	L	PF	PA	PD	PCT	LIO	POT	BAR	LIN	GOL
1	Granada Lions (Note: Granada Lions can not qualify for the playoffs, as they also play Serie B.) (X)	4	4	0	224	29	+195	1.000	—	—	—	—	—
2	Fuengirola Potros (Y)	7	6	1	281	74	+207	.857	21–39	—	21–0	46–19	56–4
3	Almería Barbarians (Y)	7	4	3	128	187	−59	.571	0–61	12–51	—	37–13	38–9
4	Sevilla Linces (Y)	7	2	5	130	242	−112	.286	8–59	0–41	25–28	—	34–13
5	Córdoba Golden Bulls (Y)	7	0	7	51	282	−231	.000	0–65	0–45	7–13	18–31	—

Source: Serie C at FieldGoal
(X) Ineligible; (Y) Refused to qualify for the playoffs

=== Catalan League ===
Pos	Team	Pld	W	D	L	GF	GA	GD	EAG	BOC	URO	RED	SEN	LEG	PAG	WOL	FAL	ALM
1	Vilafranca Eagles (Y)	9	9	0	0	359	81	+278	—	—	34–7	—	29–14	47–21	—	59–6	—	57–0
2	Argentona Bocs (Y)	9	8	0	1	328	81	+247	0–31	—	—	32–10	—	—	57–0	64–0	47–7	—
3	Barcelona Uroloki (Y)	9	7	0	2	310	112	+198	—	13–20	—	—	24–12	34–33	—	—	—	77–7
4	Terrassa Reds (Y)	9	5	1	3	272	108	+164	19–21	—	0–18	—	—	30–8	—	59–0	—	72–0
5	Vall d'Aro Senglars (Y)	9	4	1	4	193	110	+83	—	13–19	—	6–6	—	12–14	14–6	—	39–6	—
6	Torrelles Legends (Y)	9	4	0	5	281	178	+103	—	7–26	—	—	—	—	55–0	37–0	27–29	—
7	Barcelona Pagesos (Y)	9	3	0	6	92	303	−211	14–32	—	0–51	7–50	—	—	—	26–7	—	—
8	Sarrià de Ter Wolves (Y)	9	2	0	7	60	350	−290	—	—	6–47	—	0–39	—	—	—	13–6	28–13
9	Salt Falcons (Y)	9	2	0	7	122	266	−144	0–49	—	0–39	16–26	—	—	25–26	—	—	—
10	Salou Almogàvers (Y)	9	0	0	9	38	466	−428	—	0–63	—	—	6–44	0–79	12–13	—	0–33	—

Source: Serie C at FieldGoal
(Y) Refused to qualify for the playoffs

=== Central Conference ===
Pos	Team	Pld	W	L	PF	PA	PD	Qualification	TOR	WIL	JAB	SMI	CUE	STI
1	Arganda Toros (A)	6	6	0	216	45	+171	Playoffs	—	—	21–6	47–12	—	—
2	Majadahonda Wildcats (Y)	6	5	1	202	57	+145		12–13	—	26–14	—	—	—
3	Tres Cantos Jabatos (A)	6	3	3	170	121	+49	Playoffs	—	—	—	38–22	—	39–0
4	Alcorcón Smilodons (A)	6	2	4	142	160	−18	Playoffs	—	2–30	—	—	42–13	58–14
5	ANV Cuervos (Y)	6	2	4	83	246	−163		2–66	15–54	26–66	—	—	—
6	Guadalajara Stings (Y)	6	0	6	45	229	−184		7–51	6–54	—	—	12–14	—

Source: Serie C at FieldGoal
(A) Advance to a further round; (Y) Refused to qualify for the playoffs

An extra gameday was played to reach the required minimum of six games to compete in the playoffs for promotion. The results of the extra game were:

- Arganda Toros 18–6 Alcorcón Smilodons
- Majadahonda Wildcats 26–7 Tres Cantos Jabatos
- ANV Cuervos 13–6 Guadalajara Stings

=== Eastern Conference ===
Pos	Team	Pld	W	L	PF	PA	PD	Qualification	SHA	RIC	PRE	WOL	SPA
1	Alicante Sharks (A)	8	7	1	160	51	+109	Playoffs	—	27–6	14–6	36–6	36–0
2	Sueca Ricers (Y)	8	5	3	154	75	+79		24–6	—	6–12	13–0	26–0
3	Cartagena Pretorianos (Y)	7	3 (Note: Pretorianos wins head-to-head against Wolves (1–0))	4	70	81	−11		2–14	8–26	—	18–7	18–7
4	Cehegín Wolves (Y)	7	3	4	101	114	−13		7–20	22–14	TBD	—	27–13
5	La Nucía Spartans (Y)	8	1	7	27	191	−164		0–7	0–39	7–6	0–32	—

Source: Serie C at FieldGoal
(A) Advance to a further round; (Y) Refused to qualify for the playoffs

=== Northern League ===
Pos	Team	Pld	W	L	PF	PA	PD	Qualification	MAR	COY	BIS	DAR
1	Gijón Mariners (A)	6	6	0	248	29	+219	Playoffs	—	10–7	33–0	85–0
2	Santurtzi Coyotes (Note: Santurtzi Coyotes can not qualify for the playoffs, as they also play Serie B.) (X)	6	3	3	197	45	+152		20–23	—	0–6	66–0
3	Cantabria Bisons (A)	6	3	3	105	113	−8	Playoffs	2–35	6–45	—	53–0
4	Zaragoza Dark Knights (Y)	6	0	6	0	363	−363		0–62	0–59	0–38	—

Source: Serie C at FieldGoal
(A) Advance to a further round; (X) Ineligible; (Y) Refused to qualify for the playoffs

=== Playoffs ===
The top 8 teams could qualify to the promotion playoffs, but finally only six teams signed up for these. The champion of the Serie C will promote directly to Serie B, while the runner-up must play one more game against a Serie B team.

Granada Lions and Santurtzi Coyotes can not qualify for the playoffs, as they also play Serie B.

==== Tiebreakers ====
The six teams are ranked based on these criteria:

1. higher percentage of wins
2. lower average of points allowed
3. superior point difference average
4. lower average of players sent off
5. lucky draw

==== Ranking ====
#	Team	W	PA	Dif	C
1	Gijón Mariners	1.000	4.8	36.5	Northern League
2	Arganda Toros	1.000	7.5	28.5	Central Conference
3	Alicante Sharks	.875	6.4	13.6	Eastern Conference
4	Cantabria Bisons	.500	18.8	–1.3	Northern League
5	Tres Cantos Jabatos	.500	20.2	8.2	Central Conference
6	Alcorcón Smilodons	.333	26.7	–3	Central Conference

==== Bracket ====
Wild Card
April 25 & May 2
Cantabria Bisons	26	30	56
Tres Cantos Jabatos	25	7	32
April 26 & May 2
Alicante Sharks	16	34	50
Alcorcón Smilodons	6	6	12

Semifinals
May 16 & 23
Gijón Mariners	49	61	110
Cantabria Bisons	7	7	14
May 16 & 24
Arganda Toros	3	6	9
Alicante Sharks	20	13	33

Finals
May 30
Gijón Mariners	13
Alicante Sharks	0

=== Promotion/relegation playoff ===
Team 1	Score	Team 2
Zaragoza Hornets	13–7	Alicante Sharks
