= 2015–16 LNFA season =

American football season in Spain

LNFA
- Season: 2015–16
- Champions: Badalona Dracs

The 2015–16 LNFA season was the 22nd season of American football in Spain.

Teams were divided into three categories, named Serie A, B and C, with promotion and relegation between them.

Badalona Dracs won their seventh title, a record for the tournament.

== LNFA Serie A ==
=== Stadia and locations ===
Location of teams in LNFA 2016 Serie A

Six teams entered the LNFA Serie A, the top-tier level of American football in Spain. Rivas Osos, Valencia Firebats, Valencia Giants and Badalona Dracs repeated from last year. Barberà Rookies and Reus Imperials were promoted from last year LNFA Serie B.

On December 28, the three teams from the Community of Madrid (Rivas Osos from Serie A, Camioneros Coslada and Las Rozas Black Demons from Serie B) were excluded from the competition as they did not have a junior team in the junior league.

Team	Location	Stadium
Badalona Dracs	Badalona	Municipal
Barberà Rookies	Barberà del Vallès	Can Llobet
Reus Imperials	Reus	Municipal Reddis
Valencia Firebats	Valencia	Jardín del Turia
Valencia Giants	Catarroja	Polideportivo

=== Regular season ===
Pos	Team	Pld	W	L	PF	PA	PD	Qualification or relegation	DRA	FIR	ROO	IMP	GIA
1	Badalona Dracs	8	8	0	422	72	+350	Playoffs	—	51–27	47–0	67–6	53–0
2	Valencia Firebats	8	6	2	243	161	+82	Playoffs	13–38	—	32–26	62–0	40–12
3	Barberà Rookies	8	3	5	145	238	−93	Playoffs	8–56	8–26	—	29–26	18–24
4	Reus Imperials	8	2	6	142	309	−167	Playoffs	18–62	26–27	21–22	—	24–20
5	Valencia Giants	8	1	7	82	254	−172	Relegation playoffs	0–48	0–16	6–34	20–21	—

Source: Serie A at FieldGoal

=== Playoffs ===
Semi-finals
5 June, Badalona
Badalona Dracs	49
Reus Imperials	3
4 June, Valencia
Valencia Firebats	17
Barberà Rookies	6

Final
18 June, Calatayud
Badalona Dracs	41
Valencia Firebats	14

=== Promotion/relegation playoffs ===
On June 12, the fifth placed team in Serie A, Valencia Giants, played against Serie B runner-up, L'Hospitalet Pioners. Giants won the game and will play in next year Serie A.

Team 1	Score	Team 2
Valencia Giants	26–7	L'Hospitalet Pioners

== LNFA Serie B ==
Location of teams in LNFA 2016 Serie B
Yellow: Group Odd
Red: Group Even

Seven teams played the Serie B in 2016. L'Hospitalet Pioners and Mallorca Voltors were relegated from previous Serie A season. Gijón Mariners were promoted from Serie C in 2015.

The nine original teams were reduced to seven on December 28, when the Spanish Federation of American Football excluded the two teams from the Community of Madrid (Las Rozas Black Demons and Camioneros Coslada) arguing that they did not have junior teams in the junior league, one of the criteria to play the Serie A or B.

Murcia Cobras won the Serie B, and promoted to next year Serie A Season. L'Hospitalet Pioners, as runner-up, played a promotion game against the last team in 2015–16 Serie A, Valencia Giants, but lost it and remained in Serie B.

Legend
The two group winners advanced to the semifinals
The next three teams advanced to the Wild Card.
The team with the worst record would play a relegation playoff.

=== Group Odd ===
Pos	Team	Pld	W	L	PF	PA	PD	Qualification	COB	MAR	VOL	LIO
1	Murcia Cobras	6	6	0	116	23	+93	Semifinals	—	30–0	9–3	32–0
2	Gijón Mariners	6	3	3	66	95	−29	Wild Card	14–15	—	14–11	14–12
3	Mallorca Voltors	6	2	4	77	87	−10	Wild Card	6–16	20–14	—	27–7
4	Granada Lions	6	1	5	53	107	−54	Wild Card	0–14	7–10	27–10	—

Source: Serie B at FieldGoal

=== Group Even ===
Pos	Team	Pld	W	L	PF	PA	PD	Qualification	PIO	BUF	COY
1	L'Hospitalet Pioners	5	4	1	150	59	+91	Semifinals	—	28–7	40–7
2	Barcelona Búfals	6	4	2	118	111	+7	Wild Card	14–29; 31–30	—	29–10
3	Santurtzi Coyotes	5	0	5	31	129	−98		0–23	6–23; 8–14	—

Source: Serie B at FieldGoal

=== Promotion playoffs ===
Wild Card
May 7, Gijón
Gijón Mariners	7
Mallorca Voltors	0
May 7, Barcelona
Barcelona Búfals	16
Granada Lions	7

Semifinals
May 21, Murcia
Murcia Cobras	27
Gijón Mariners	7
May 21, L'Hospitalet
L'Hospitalet Pioners	28
Barcelona Búfals	7

Final
June 4, Murcia
Murcia Cobras	10
L'Hospitalet Pioners	8

== LNFA Serie C ==
The Serie C was composed by the Regional and interregional leagues. The top 8 teams could qualify to the promotion playoffs, but finally only two teams signed up for the playoffs. The three teams from the Community of Madrid that were excluded in December 2015 from the 2015–16 season took part in the promotion playoffs.

Rivas Osos won the Serie C, and promoted to next year Serie B Season.

=== Andalusian League ===
Pos	Team	Pld	W	L	PF	PA	PD	Comments	LIO	POT	BAR	LIN
1	Granada Lions (Note: Granada Lions can not qualify for the playoffs, as they also play Serie B.) (X)	6	5 (Note: Lions ahead on head-to-head record; Lions–Potros 26–31, Potros–Lions 7–20.)	1	291	66	+225		—	26–31	29–15	69–6
2	Fuengirola Potros	6	5	1	254	52	+202	Playoffs	7–20	—	47–0	54–0
3	Almería Barbarians (Y)	6	2	4	113	205	−92		7–55	0–61	—	51–0
4	Sevilla Linces (Y)	6	0	6	25	360	−335		0–92	6–54	13–40	—

Source: Andalusian League at FieldGoal
(X) Ineligible for the playoffs; (Y) Refused to qualify for the playoffs

=== Catalan League ===
Pos	Team	Pld	W	L	GF	GA	GD	BOC	URO	FAL	RED	EAG	PAG	LEG	ALM
1	Argentona Bocs (Y)	7	7	0	277	27	+250	—	42–0	—	—	—	—	42–0	73–0
2	Barcelona Uroloki (Y)	7	5 (Note: Uroloki ahead on head-to-head record; Uroloki 14–11 Falcons/Senglars.)	2	119	94	+25	—	—	14–11	6–12	13–9	14–8	—	—
3	Salt Falcons/Senglars (Y)	7	5	2	207	107	+100	13–45	—	—	—	—	—	47–7	48–6
4	Terrassa Reds (Y)	7	4	3	167	101	+66	7–40	—	8–25	—	—	6–13	—	—
5	Vilafranca Eagles (Y)	7	3 (Note: Eagles ahead on head-to-head record; Eagles 48–19 Pagesos.)	4	183	143	+40	7–22	—	14–29	15–34	—	48–19	—	—
6	Barcelona Pagesos (Y)	7	3	4	125	131	−6	0–13	—	13–34	—	—	—	37–7	35–9
7	Torrelles Legends (Y)	7	1	6	71	280	−209	—	12–33	—	2–54	26–58	—	—	17–9
8	Salou Almogàvers (Y)	7	0	7	24	290	−266	—	0–39	—	0–46	0–32	—	—	—

Source: Catalan League at FieldGoal
(Y) Refused to qualify for the playoffs

=== Madrid League ===
Pos	Team	Pld	W	L	PF	PA	PD	Qualification	CAM	SMI	TOR	WIL	JAB	CAP	STI	BLA
1	Camioneros Coslada	7	7	0	299	21	+278	Playoffs	—	—	—	35–0	43–0	—	—	62–0
2	Alcorcón Smilodons (Y)	7	5	2	111	85	+26		0–38	—	—	—	—	27–6	—	1–0
3	Madrid Toros (Y)	7	5	2	151	114	+37		21–26	8–22	—	—	—	42–7	—	1–0
4	Majadahonda Wildcats (Y)	7	4	3	224	107	+117		—	2–8	36–44	—	24–20	—	56–0	—
5	Tres Cantos Jabatos (Y)	7	4	3	182	129	+53		—	19–6	20–28	—	—	29–22	48–6	—
6	Madrid Capitals (Y)	7	2	5	83	214	−131		0–42	—	—	0–62	—	—	20–0	—
7	Guadalajara Stings (Y)	7	1	6	33	239	−206		0–53	12–47	3–7	—	—	—	—	—
8	Arganda Blackhawks (Y)	7	0	7	20	194	−174		—	—	—	0–44	0–46	12–28	8–12	—

Source: Madrid League at ACFAM
(Y) Refused to qualify for the playoffs

=== East Conference ===
Pos	Team	Pld	W	L	PF	PA	PD	PCT	SHA	PRE	SPA	WOL	SAN
1	Alicante Sharks (Y)	6	6	0	186	26	+160	1.000	—	24–8	22–0	48–6	43–0
2	Cartagena Pretorianos (Y)	7	4	3	174	106	+68	.571	6–28	—	—	22–12	49–0
3	La Nucía Spartans (Y)	6	3	3	72	103	−31	.500	—	21–20	—	14–0	19–14
4	Cehegín Wolves (Y)	7	2	5	108	162	−54	.286	6–21	14–38	35–12	—	—
5	Rafelbunyol Sants (Y)	6	1	5	40	183	−143	.167	—	7–31	12–6	7–35	—

Source: East Conference at FieldGoal
(Y) Refused to qualify for the playoffs

=== Northern League ===
Pos	Team	Pld	W	L	PF	PA	PD	Qualification	BIS	HUR	MAD	HOR	DAR	CUE	BER	ROY
1	Cantabria Bisons (Y)	6	6	0	370	19	+351		—				49–7		56–6	108–0
2	Zaragoza Hurricanes (Y)	6	6	0	238	22	+216			—		30–7		62–0		66–0
3	Oviedo Madbulls (Y)	6	4	2	219	128	+91		0–79	8–16	—					68–0
4	Zaragoza Hornets (Y)	6	3	3	82	76	+6		6–7	0–27		—	28–6			
5	Zaragoza Dark Knights (Y)	6	2	4	123	162	−39			7–37	27–28		—	48–0		
6	Cuervos ANVL	6	2	4	65	183	−118	Playoffs				6–39	20–28	—	27–6	
7	Piélagos Berserkers (Y)	6	1	5	35	229	−194		0–71		6–60	0–2			—	
8	Gijón Royals (Y)	6	0	6	13	326	−313				0–55			0–12	13–17	—

Source: FEFAPA
(Y) Refused to qualify for the playoffs

=== Playoffs ===
The top 8 teams could qualify to the promotion playoffs, but finally only two teams signed up for these. The three teams from the Community of Madrid that were excluded in December 2015 from the 2015–16 season will take part in the promotion playoffs.

The champion of the Serie C will promote directly to Serie B, while the runner-up must play one more game against a Serie B team.

==== Tiebreakers ====
The two teams were ranked based on these criteria:

1. higher percentage of wins
2. lower average of points allowed
3. superior point difference average
4. lower average of players sent off
5. lucky draw

==== Ranking ====
#	Team	W	PA	Dif	C
1	Fuengirola Potros	.833	8.7	33.7	Andalusian League
2	ANVL Cuervos	.333	30.5	–19.7	Northern League

==== Bracket ====
Wild Card
April 29, Las Rozas
Las Rozas Black Demons	20
Camioneros Coslada	8

Semifinals
May 14, Fuengirola
Fuengirola Potros	0
Las Rozas Black Demons	20
May 15
ANVL Cuervos	0
Rivas Osos	58

Final
May 28
Las Rozas Black Demons	0
Rivas Osos	18
