= LNFA 2012 =

American football season in Spain

The 2012 LNFA season was the 18th season of top-tier American football in Spain. The regular season was played from January 29, 2012 until the end of may, 2012.

L'Hospitalet Pioners won their 5th LNFA title and the third in a row.

== System change ==
The competition system was changed for this season. The top six teams from the previous season were included in a new conference, called LNFA Elite, and only those were able to play for the title. At the end of the regular season, the top 4 teams of the LNFA Elite (Rivas Osos, L'Hospitalet Pioners, Valencia Firebats and Badalona Dracs) played a single-elimination tournament for the title. 5th place's team of the LNFA Elite (Barberà Rookies) went into another single-elimination game against the team placed 2nd within the other conferences' sudden death tournament (Valencia Giants) to determine which of the two will play at the LNFA Elite next season, while 6th place's team of the LNFA Elite (Sueca Ricers) will be replaced by the winner of the other conferences' sudden death tournament (Las Rozas Black Demons).

== Results ==
=== LNFA Elite ===
==== Regular season ====
Legend
The four top teams will qualify for the championship play-offs
The fifth place will compete in the promotion/relegation play-off
The last team will be relegated to the LNFA next season

Team	P	W	T	L	PF	PA	Dif
Rivas Osos	10	8	0	2	264	140	+124
L'Hospitalet Pioners	10	8	0	2	345	163	+182
Valencia Firebats	10	6	0	4	268	181	+87
Badalona Dracs	10	5	0	5	204	141	+63
Barberà Rookies	10	2	0	8	80	295	–215
Sueca Ricers	10	1	0	9	68	309	–241

	DRA	FIR	OSO	PIO	RIC	ROO
Badalona Dracs		24–27	24–22	6–14	1–0	48–0
Valencia Firebats	18–10		20–37	31–24	36–6	54–0
Rivas Osos	14–13	13–12		14–26	31–0	31–12
L'Hospitalet Pioners	40–12	43–35	21–38		49–12	34–7
Sueca Ricers	6–43	6–0	12–43	8–63		0–17
Barberà Rookies	0–23	18–35	0–21	0–31	26–18	

==== Playoffs ====
The four top teams will play for the 2012 LNFA title. The semifinals will be 1st vs. 4th and 2nd vs. 3rd. The games will be played in the home of the highest seed.

Semifinals
1	Rivas Osos	17
4	Badalona Dracs	16
2	L'Hospitalet Pioners	24
3	Valencia Firebats	14

Finals
1	Rivas Osos	24
2	L'Hospitalet Pioners	47

=== LNFA ===
==== Regular season ====
Legend
Group winners and runners-up advanced to the promotion play-offs
The two best runners-up advanced to the promotion play-offs

===== North Conference =====
Team	P	W	T	L	PF	PA	Dif
Las Rozas Black Demons	8	7	0	1	228	33	+195
Zaragoza Hurricanes	8	5	2	1	115	68	+47
Gijón Mariners	8	3	1	4	54	97	-43
Camioneros Coslada	8	2	0	6	43	152	-109
Coyotes Santurtzi	8	1	1	6	9	99	-90

	BLA	CAM	COY	HUR	MAR
Las Rozas Black Demons		38–6	31–0	49–6	45–0
Camioneros Coslada	0–37		6–0	12–14	0–13
Coyotes Santurtzi	0–14	0–7		0–0	7–0
Zaragoza Hurricanes	21–10	35–0	18–2		21–3
Gijón Mariners	0–12	15–12	23–0	0–0	

===== South Conference =====
Team	P	W	L	T	PF	PA	Dif	TB
Murcia Cobras	8	8	0	0	277	43	+234	
Granada Lions	8	6	0	2	183	95	+88	
Sevilla Linces	8	4	0	4	178	128	+50	
Alicante Sharks	8	1	0	7	61	238	–177	1–1 (+14)
Cehegín Wolves	8	1	0	7	43	238	–195	1–1 (–14)

	COB	LIN	LIO	SHA	WOL
Murcia Cobras		33–0	36–19	28–3	51–3
Sevilla Linces	6–23		20–22	64–0	26–14
Granada Lions	12–18	24–15		24–6	33–0
Alicante Sharks	0–54	12–14	0–28		12–14
Cehegín Wolves	0–34	0–33	0–21	12–28	

===== East Conference =====
Team	P	W	L	T	PF	PA	Dif	TB
Barcelona Búfals	8	7	0	1	196	70	+126	1–1 (+10)
Mallorca Voltors	8	7	0	1	214	80	+134	1–1 (–10)
Valencia Giants	8	4	0	4	180	139	+41	
Terrassa Reds	8	2	0	6	108	215	–107	
Museros Bous	8	0	0	8	90	284	–194	

	BOU	BUF	GIA	RED	VOL
Museros Bous		3–47	14–31	12–33	0–44
Barcelona Búfals	39–15		20–14	2–0	30–6
Valencia Giants	41–21	6–18		28–14	12–19
Terrassa Reds	21–19	6–34	20–36		14–28
Mallorca Voltors	28–6	20–6	13–12	56–0	

==== Playoffs ====
The eight top teams will compete for the promotion to the LNFA Elite. The LNFA champions will promote, while the runner-up will play the promotion playoff against the fifth team in the LNFA Elite.

Quarter-finals
1	Murcia Cobras	34
8	Valencia Giants	40
4	Mallorca Voltors	14
5	Granada Lions	6
2	Las Rozas Black Demons	40
7	Sevilla Linces	6
3	Barcelona Búfals	21
6	Zaragoza Hurricanes	27

Semi-finals
8	Valencia Giants	12
4	Mallorca Voltors	10
2	Las Rozas Black Demons	6
6	Zaragoza Hurricanes	0

Final
8	Valencia Giants	10
2	Las Rozas Black Demons	14

- Las Rozas Black Demons promoted to LNFA Elite 2013.
- Valencia Giants won the Promotion Game against Barberà Rookies and promote to LNFA Elite 2013.
