= LNFA 2014 =

American football season in Spain

The LNFA 2014 season was the 20th season of top-tier American football in Spain.

As in the previous season, the teams were divided into two categories, renamed Serie A and Serie B, with promotion and relegation between both divisions.

The 2013-14 season started on November 6, with the first game of the Spanish Cup, and finished on June 15, with the LNFA Bowl game.

L'Hospitalet Pioners are the defending champions, but lost to Badalona Dracs in the semifinals. Dracs ended the season winning their sixth title.

== Spanish Cup ==
Seven teams entered the competition. L'Hospitalet Pioners won the title for the fifth time in a row and ninth overall.

Wild card
6 November – Santurtzi
Coyotes Santurtzi	6
Las Rozas Black Demons	12

Quarterfinals
17 November – Las Rozas
Las Rozas Black Demons	21
Valencia Giants	17
16 November – Rivas-Vaciamadrid
Rivas Osos	22
Valencia Firebats	20

Semifinals
24 November – Las Rozas
Las Rozas Black Demons	13
Badalona Dracs	31
23 November – Rivas-Vaciamadrid
Rivas Osos	8
L'Hospitalet Pioners	15

Final
7 December – Badalona
Badalona Dracs	27
L'Hospitalet Pioners	31

== LNFA Serie A ==
Location of teams in LNFA 2014

Six teams entered the LNFA Serie A, the top-tier level of American football in Spain. L'Hospitalet Pioners, Rivas Osos, Valencia Firebats, Rivas Osos and Badalona Dracs repeated from last year. Granada Lions were promoted from last year LNFA Serie B.

=== Regular season ===
Legend
The four top teams will qualify for the championship play-offs
The fifth place will compete in the promotion/relegation play-off
The last team will be relegated to the LNFA Serie B

Team	P	W	L	PF	PA	Dif	Head-to-head
Badalona Dracs	10	9	1	346	184	+162	
Valencia Firebats	10	6	4	219	194	+25	FIR 28–0 OSO; OSO 34–15 FIR
Rivas Osos	10	6	4	229	194	+35	FIR 28–0 OSO; OSO 34–15 FIR
L'Hospitalet Pioners	10	5	5	264	224	+40	
Valencia Giants	10	4	6	187	192	–5	
Granada Lions	10	0	10	136	393	–257	

	DRA	FIR	GIA	LIO	OSO	PIO
Badalona Dracs		46–8	31–6	41–22	27–21	9–24
Valencia Firebats	20–21		14–6	40–32 OT	28–0	14–29
Valencia Giants	10–42	7–21		41–6	21–11	43–15
Granada Lions	25–54	6–38	0–37		24–28	0–53
Rivas Osos	21–28	34–15	17–10	28–6		41–16
L'Hospitalet Pioners	27–47	13–21	35–6	33–15	19–28	

=== Playoffs ===
Semifinals; May 24–25
1	Badalona Dracs	38
4	L'Hospitalet Pioners	20
2	Valencia Firebats	22
3	Rivas Osos	12

LNFA Bowl; June 15
1	Badalona Dracs	24
2	Valencia Firebats	18

== LNFA Serie B ==
Location of teams in LNFA Serie B 2014
Yellow: North Group
Green: East Group
Red: South Group

14 teams entered the LNFA Serie B, the second level of American football in Spain. They were divided in three conferences.

Eight teams qualified to the promotion playoffs, where the three group winners had the three first seeds.

The four worst teams in the regular season played to avoid the relegation to the new Serie C, which will be created in 2015. Alicante Sharks and Sueca Ricers were relegated to Serie C.

=== Regular season ===
Legend
The champions of each group were the top seeded in the promotion play-offs
Five teams qualified for the play-offs
The four worst teams played the relegation play-offs

==== North Group ====
Team	P	W	L	PF	PA	Dif
Las Rozas Black Demons	8	7	1	208	59	+149
Camioneros Coslada	8	6	2	149	68	+81
Gijón Mariners	8	4	4	169	109	+60
Santurtzi Coyotes	8	3	5	114	100	+14
Cantabria Bisons	8	0	8	27	331	–304

	BIS	BLA	CAM	COY	MAR
Cantabria Bisons		0–32	7–26	6–49	12–51
Las Rozas Black Demons	42–0		18–6	20–0	35–6
Camioneros Coslada	39–0	14–12		34–9	8–0
Santurtzi Coyotes	30–0	10–21	6–8		10–0
Gijón Mariners	62–2	23–28	16–14	11–0	

==== East Group ====
Team	P	W	L	PF	PA	Dif	Head-to-head
Imperials Reus	8	7	1	219	49	+170	
Barcelona Búfals	8	5	3	125	62	+63	BUF 34–6 ROO; ROO 9–0 BUF
Barberà Rookies	8	5	3	96	63	+33	BUF 34–6 ROO; ROO 9–0 BUF
Zaragoza Hurricanes	8	2	6	46	146	–100	
Zaragoza Hornets	8	1	7	23	189	–166	

	BUF	HOR	HUR	IMP	ROO
Barcelona Búfals		10–0	14–0	7–21	34–6
Zaragoza Hornets	0–26		8–14	6–35	9–6
Zaragoza Hurricanes	0–27	16–0		0–48	0–10
Imperials Reus	26–7	61–0	14–10		6–0
Barberà Rookies	9–0	21–0	25–6	19–8	

==== South Group ====
Team	P	W	L	PF	PA	Dif	Head-to-head
Mallorca Voltors	6	6	0	177	44	+133	
Murcia Cobras	6	4	2	195	60	+135	
Sueca Ricers	6	1	5	67	136	–69	RIC 44–0 SHA; SHA 17–7 RIC
Alicante Sharks	6	1	5	36	235	–199	RIC 44–0 SHA; SHA 17–7 RIC

	COB	RIC	SHA	VOL
Murcia Cobras		47–0	61–0	12–26
Sueca Ricers	8–19		44–0	8–13
Alicante Sharks	7–44	17–7		6–25
Mallorca Voltors	19–12	40–0	54–6	

=== Promotion playoffs ===
Quarterfinals; 27 April
1	Mallorca Voltors	7
8	Gijón Mariners	0
4	Camioneros Coslada	26
5	Murcia Cobras	31
2	Imperials Reus	20
7	Barberà Rookies	0
3	Las Rozas Black Demons	16
6	Barcelona Búfals	3

Semifinals; 11 May
1	Mallorca Voltors	13
5	Murcia Cobras	6
2	Imperials Reus	20
3	Las Rozas Black Demons	7

Final; 24 May
1	Mallorca Voltors	9
2	Imperials Reus	7

=== Relegation playoffs ===
Team 1	Agg.	Team 2	1st leg	2nd leg
Cantabria Bisons	Susp.	Sueca Ricers	–	–
Zaragoza Hornets	30–19	Alicante Sharks	14–19	16–0

Alicante Sharks and Sueca Ricers are relegated to 2014–15 Serie C.

== Promotion/relegation playoffs ==
The fifth placed team in Serie A played Serie B runner-up. The game took place in Valencia on June 7. Valencia Giants won the game and will play in next season Serie A.

Team 1	Score	Team 2
Valencia Giants	33–14	Imperials Reus
