= LNFA 2008 =

American football season in Spain

LNFA
- Season: 2008
- Dates: 2 February – 24 May
- Champions: L'Hospitalet Pioners

The 2008 LNFA season was the 14th season of American football in Spain.

L'Hospitalet Pioners were the champions.

== Regular season ==
Pos	Team	Pld	W	L	Qualification
1	L'Hospitalet Pioners	8	8	0	Qualification to playoffs
2	Valencia Firebats	8	7	1	Qualification to playoffs
3	Rivas Osos	8	6	2	Qualification to playoffs
4	Badalona Dracs	8	5	3	Qualification to playoffs
5	Gijón Mariners	8	4	4	
6	Barcelona Búfals	8	3	5	
7	Granada Lions	8	2	6	
8	Sevilla Linces	8	1	7	
9	Barcelona Uroloki	8	0	8	

== Playoffs ==
The playoffs were played between the four best qualified teams. The final, called LNFA Bowl, was played at the Estadío Olímpico de La Cartuja in Seville.

Semi-finals
L'Hospitalet Pioners	21
Badalona Dracs	0
Valencia Firebats	21
Rivas Osos	15

LNFA Bowl
24 May – Seville
L'Hospitalet Pioners	36
Valencia Firebats	17
