= LNFA 2018 =

American football season in Spain

LNFA
- Season: 2018
- Champions: Badalona Dracs (9th title)

The 2018 LNFA season is the 24th season of American football in Spain.

Teams were divided into two categories, named Serie A and B.

Badalona Dracs are the defending champions.

== LNFA Serie A ==
=== Competition format changes ===
The FEFA agreed to expand the Serie A to three groups of five teams according to geographical criteria, for reducing the economical costs for the clubs.

After the resignation of runners-up Reus Imperials to continue playing the league due to financial difficulties only two days before the start of the season, the Group A was reduced to four teams.

At the end of the regular season, The twelve best qualified teams overall will qualify to the playoffs while the two worst teams will play the relegation playoffs.

=== Tiebreakers ===
If two or more teams are tied at the end of the competition, the ranking of teams in each group is based on the following criteria:

1. Highest percentage of wins in games between tied teams.
2. Lowest percentage of points against in games between tied teams.
3. Highest difference between points scored and points against in games between tied teams.
4. Lowest percentage of points against in all the games.
5. Highest difference between points scored and points against in all the games.
6. Lowest percentage of sent off players in all the games.
7. Drawing of lots.

=== Stadia and locations ===
Location of teams in LNFA 2018 Serie A

Fifteen teams entered the LNFA Serie A, the top-tier level of American football in Spain, after the changes in the competition format.

| Team | Location | Stadium |
|---|---|---|
| Alicante Sharks | Alicante | Antonio Solana |
| Badalona Dracs | Badalona | Badalona Sud |
| Coslada Camioneros | Coslada | Valleaguado |
| Gijón Mariners | Gijón | Las Mestas |
| Granada Lions | Granada | Antonio Prieto Castillo |
| L'Hospitalet Pioners | L'Hospitalet de Llobregat | Hospitalet Nord |
| Las Rozas Black Demons | Las Rozas de Madrid | El Cantizal |
| Mallorca Voltors | Palma | Son Moix |
| Murcia Cobras | Murcia | José Barnés |
| Rivas Osos | Rivas Vaciamadrid | Cerro del Telégrafo |
| Santiago Black Ravens | Santiago de Compostela | Santa Isabel |
| Santurtzi Coyotes | Santurtzi | Mikel Trueba |
| Valencia Firebats | Valencia | Jardín del Turia |
| Valencia Giants | Catarroja | Polideportivo |

=== Regular season ===
==== Group A ====
| Pos | Team | Pld | W | L | GF | GA | GD | BAD | VFI | MLL | HOS |
|---|---|---|---|---|---|---|---|---|---|---|---|
| 1 | Badalona Dracs | 6 | 6 | 0 | 278 | 35 | +243 | — | 48–6 | 62–13 | 42–3 |
| 2 | Valencia Firebats | 6 | 3 | 3 | 101 | 135 | −34 | 7–42 | — | 20–27 | 32–6 |
| 3 | Mallorca Voltors | 6 | 3 | 3 | 120 | 170 | −50 | 0–50 | 0–18 | — | 39–13 |
| 4 | L'Hospitalet Pioners | 6 | 0 | 6 | 47 | 206 | −159 | 6–34 | 12–18 | 7–41 | — |

Source: FEFA

==== Group B ====
| Pos | Team | Pld | W | L | GF | GA | GD | MUR | COS | VGI | GRA | ALI |
|---|---|---|---|---|---|---|---|---|---|---|---|---|
| 1 | Murcia Cobras | 8 | 8 | 0 | 293 | 39 | +254 | — | 7–0 | 40–0 | 48–8 | 53–0 |
| 2 | Coslada Camioneros | 8 | 6 | 2 | 261 | 39 | +222 | 13–16 | — | 42–16 | 38–0 | 42–0 |
| 3 | Valencia Giants | 8 | 4 | 4 | 118 | 193 | −75 | 18–45 | 0–47 | — | 14–6 | 28–6 |
| 4 | Granada Lions | 8 | 1 | 7 | 42 | 238 | −196 | 0–50 | 0–44 | 0–22 | — | 28–14 |
| 5 | Alicante Sharks | 8 | 1 | 7 | 35 | 240 | −205 | 0–34 | 0–35 | 7–20 | 8–0 | — |

Source: FEFA

==== Group C ====
| Pos | Team | Pld | W | L | GF | GA | GD | ROZ | RIV | GIJ | STZ | STG |
|---|---|---|---|---|---|---|---|---|---|---|---|---|
| 1 | Las Rozas Black Demons | 8 | 7 | 1 | 319 | 66 | +253 | — | 13–17 | 40–0 | 41–0 | 46–0 |
| 2 | Rivas Osos | 8 | 7 | 1 | 290 | 69 | +221 | 35–37 | — | 27–12 (Note: Match finished after the third quarter.) | 55–0 | 46–0 |
| 3 | Gijón Mariners | 8 | 4 | 4 | 172 | 186 | −14 | 14–39 | 7–47 | — | 40–13 | 23–0 |
| 4 | Santurtzi Coyotes | 8 | 2 | 6 | 101 | 263 | −162 | 0–54 | 0–26 | 20–27 | — | 20–0 |
| 5 | Santiago Black Ravens | 8 | 0 | 8 | 20 | 318 | −298 | 0–49 | 0–37 | 0–49 | 20–48 | — |

Source: FEFA

=== Overall standings ===
| Pos | Grp | Team | Pld | W | L | PF | PA | PD | PCT | Qualification |
|---|---|---|---|---|---|---|---|---|---|---|
| 1 | B | Murcia Cobras | 8 | 8 | 0 | 293 | 39 | +254 | 1.000 | Advance to quarterfinals |
| 2 | A | Badalona Dracs | 6 | 6 | 0 | 278 | 35 | +243 | 1.000 | Advance to quarterfinals |
| 3 | C | Rivas Osos | 8 | 7 | 1 | 290 | 69 | +221 | .875 | Advance to quarterfinals |
| 4 | C | Las Rozas Black Demons | 8 | 7 | 1 | 319 | 66 | +253 | .875 | Advance to quarterfinals |
| 5 | B | Coslada Camioneros | 8 | 6 | 2 | 261 | 39 | +222 | .750 | Advance to wildcard round |
| 6 | A | Valencia Firebats | 6 | 3 | 3 | 101 | 135 | −34 | .500 | Advance to wildcard round |
| 7 | C | Gijón Mariners | 8 | 4 | 4 | 172 | 186 | −14 | .500 | Advance to wildcard round |
| 8 | B | Valencia Giants | 8 | 4 | 4 | 118 | 193 | −75 | .500 | Advance to wildcard round |
| 9 | A | Mallorca Voltors | 6 | 3 | 3 | 120 | 170 | −50 | .500 | Advance to wildcard round |
| 10 | C | Santurtzi Coyotes | 8 | 2 | 6 | 101 | 263 | −162 | .250 | Advance to wildcard round |
| 11 | B | Granada Lions | 8 | 1 | 7 | 42 | 238 | −196 | .125 | Advance to wildcard round |
| 12 | B | Alicante Sharks | 8 | 1 | 7 | 35 | 240 | −205 | .125 | Advance to wildcard round |
| 13 | A | L'Hospitalet Pioners | 6 | 0 | 6 | 47 | 206 | −159 | .000 | Qualified to relegation playoffs |
| 14 | C | Santiago Black Ravens | 8 | 0 | 8 | 20 | 318 | −298 | .000 | Qualified to relegation playoffs |

Source: FEFA
Rules for classification: 1) Winning percentage; 2) Points against per game

=== Playoffs ===
Wildcard
29 April
Valencia Giants | 2
Mallorca Voltors | 41
28 April
Coslada Camioneros | 42
Alicante Sharks | 0
29 April
Gijón Mariners | 50
Santurtzi Coyotes | 0
28 April
Valencia Firebats | 53
Granada Lions | 10

Quarterfinals
5 May
Murcia Cobras | 35
Mallorca Voltors | 14
5 May
Las Rozas Black Demons | 22
Coslada Camioneros | 12
6 May
Badalona Dracs | 78
Gijón Mariners | 12
5 May
Rivas Osos | 20
Valencia Firebats | 15

Semifinals
19 May
Murcia Cobras | 35
Las Rozas Black Demons | 28
20 May
Badalona Dracs | 48
Rivas Osos | 0

LNFA Bowl
2 June – Gijón
Murcia Cobras | 26
Badalona Dracs | 33

== Copa de España ==
Prior to the season, the Copa de España was played between the THREE teams that registered in the competition.

Badalona Dracs achieved their third trophy ever.

The final was played at Polideportivo Batiste Subies, in La Pobla de Farnals.

First round
12 November 2018 – Coslada
Coslada Camioneros | 0
Las Rozas Black Demons | 13

Semifinal
25 November 2018 – La Pobla de Farnals
Badalona Dracs | 26
Las Rozas Black Demons | 7
