= LNFA 2011 =

American football season in Spain

Location of teams in LNFA 2011 season

The 2011 LNFA season was the 17th season of top-tier American football in Spain. The regular season began on January 22, 2011 and ended on May 14, 2011. The playoffs began on May 15 and ended on June 18.

The tournament was about to keep its format of 15 teams divided into three conferences of five teams each, but Marbella Sharks withdrew the competition months before it started, so the teams were reassigned. The Spanish Conference included the six top teams of the 2010 season. The National and Hispanic Conferences included four teams each. At the end of the regular season, the three top finishers of the Conferencia Española accessed directly to the semi-finals for the title, and faced the winner of the playoffs between wild cards.

L'Hospitalet Pioners won their fourth LNFA title, the second in a row.

== Results ==
=== Regular season ===
==== Spanish Conference ====
Team	P	W	L	T	PF	PA	Dif
L'Hospitalet Pioners	10	9	1	0	421	142	+279
Valencia Firebats	10	6	4	0	268	279	–11
Badalona Dracs	10	5	5	0	366	262	+104
Rivas Osos	10	5	5	0	252	268	–16
Las Rozas Black Demons	10	3	7	0	174	292	–118
Barcelona Búfals	10	2	8	0	129	367	-238

==== National Conference ====
Team	P	W	L	T	PF	PA	Dif
Sueca Ricers	8	8	0	0	363	37	+326
Valencia Giants	8	4	3	1	127	95	+32
Coyotes Santurtzi	8	2	5	1	22	247	–225
Gijón Mariners	8	1	7	0	52	174	–122

==== Hispanic Conference ====
Team	P	W	L	T	PF	PA	Dif
Barberà Rookies	8	6	2	0	192	105	+87
Camioneros de Coslada	8	4	3	1	116	110	+6
Zaragoza Hurricanes	8	4	3	1	145	133	+12
Terrassa Reds	8	1	7	0	138	244	–106

=== Play-offs ===
Home	Score	Away	Match Information
Home	Score	Away	Date and Time	Venue	Referee	Crowd
WILD CARD 1
Valencia Giants	0–21	Barberà Rookies	May 15, 12:00 CEST	Polideportivo El Saler, Valencia	-	-
WILD CARD 2
Sueca Ricers	50–6	Barberà Rookies	May 21, 17:00 CEST	Antonio Puchades Stadium, Sueca	-	-
SEMI FINALS
L'Hospitalet Pioners	49–6	Sueca Ricers	June 4, 18:00 CEST	-	-	-
Valencia Firebats	22–30 (OT)	Badalona Dracs	June 4, 18:00 CEST	Polideportivo El Saler, Valencia	-	-
FINAL
L'Hospitalet Pioners	24–8	Badalona Dracs	June 18, 17:30 CEST	Serrahima Stadium, Barcelona	-	-

== See also ==
- LNFA
