= LNFA 2020 =

American football season in Spain

LNFA
- Season: 2020
- Dates: 11 January – 31 May

The 2020 LNFA season is the 26th season of American football in Spain.

Badalona Dracs are the defending champions.

== Competition format ==
For the 2020 season, ten teams joined the league. Valencia Firebats and Granada Lions resigned to their place, while L'Hospitalet Pioners replaced Santiago Black Ravens, relegated from the previous season.

The teams were divided into two groups of five, according to geographical criteria. All teams play ten games during the regular season: two games (home and away) against each other team in their group, plus two inter-group games (against one team of each other group).

At the end of the regular season, the best three teams in each group qualify for the playoffs. Final position in the aggregate table will determine seeding for the playoffs.

=== Tiebreakers ===
If two or more teams are tied at the end of the competition, the ranking of teams in each group is based on the following criteria:

1. Highest percentage of wins in games between tied teams.
2. Lowest percentage of points against in games between tied teams.
3. Highest difference between points scored and points against in games between tied teams.
4. Lowest percentage of points against in all the games.
5. Highest difference between points scored and points against in all the games.
6. Lowest percentage of sent off players in all the games.
7. Drawing of lots.

== Stadia and locations ==
Location of teams in LNFA 2020 Serie A

Ten teams entered the LNFA Serie A, the top-tier level of American football in Spain.

Team	Location	Stadium
Badalona Dracs	Badalona	Pomar
Coslada Camioneros	Coslada	Valleaguado
Fuengirola Potros	Fuengirola	Elola
Gijón Mariners	Gijón	Las Mestas
L'Hospitalet Pioners	L'Hospitalet de Llobregat	Joan Serrahima
Las Rozas Black Demons	Las Rozas de Madrid	El Cantizal
Mallorca Voltors	Palma	Son Moix
Murcia Cobras	Murcia	José Barnés
Rivas Osos	Rivas Vaciamadrid	Cerro del Telégrafo
Zaragoza Hurricanes	Zaragoza	David Cañada

== Regular season ==
=== Group North ===
Pos	Team	Pld	W	L	PF	PA	PD	PCT	Qualification	BAD	RIV	HOS	ZAR	GIJ
1	Badalona Dracs	5	5	0	196	101	+95	1.000	Qualification to semifinals	—	10–7	22 Mar	52–14	55–21
2	Rivas Osos	5	3	2	174	97	+77	.600	Qualification to wildcard game	38–39	—	14 Mar	34–0	4 Apr
3	L'Hospitalet Pioners	5	3	2	161	130	+31	.600	Qualification to wildcard game	21–40	28–49	—	18 Apr	30–19
4	Zaragoza Hurricanes	4	1	3	22	145	−123	.250		5 Apr	22 Mar	0–53	—	8–6
5	Gijón Mariners	5	0	5	88	168	−80	.000		18 Apr	20–46	22–29	14 Mar	—

Updated to match(es) played on 1 March 2020. Source: FEFA

=== Group South ===
Pos	Team	Pld	W	L	PF	PA	PD	PCT	Qualification	ROZ	MLL	MUR	FUE	COS
1	Las Rozas Black Demons	5	5	0	157	70	+87	1.000	Qualification to semifinals	—	4 Apr	28–0	18 Apr	22 Mar
2	Mallorca Voltors	4	3	1	151	81	+70	.750	Qualification to wildcard	38–39	—	41–16	15 Mar	19 Apr
3	Murcia Cobras	5	2	3	88	104	−16	.400	Qualification to wildcard	7–21	21 Mar	—	20–14	45–0
4	Fuengirola Potros	5	2	3	90	128	−38	.400		19–55	6–41	5 Apr	—	35–6
5	Coslada Camioneros	5	0	5	38	141	−103	.000		6–14	20–31	15 Mar	6–16	—

Updated to match(es) played on 1 March 2020. Source: FEFA

== Playoffs ==
Wildcard
25–26 April – TBD
2nd Group South
3rd Group North
25–26 April – TBD
2nd Group North
3rd Group South

Semi-finals
9–10 May – TBD
1st Group North
9–10 May – TBD
1st Group South

LNFA Bowl
30–31 May – TBD

== Copa de España ==
Prior to the season, the Copa de España was played between the 10 teams that registered in the competition. Badalona Dracs successfully defended the title, achieving their fifth Cup overall.

First round
2 November 2019 – Alcobendas
Alcobendas Cavaliers	27
Mallorca Voltors	3
2 November 2019 – Rivas
Osos Rivas	7
L'Hospitalet Pioners	29

Quarter-finals
10 November 2019 – Badalona
Badalona Dracs	23
Alcobendas Cavaliers	0
9 November 2019 – Gijón
Gijón Mariners	13
L'Hospitalet Pioners	14
9 November 2019 – Las Rozas
Las Rozas Black Demons	20
Murcia Cobras	0
10 November 2019 – Coslada
Coslada Camioneros	37
Zaragoza Hurricanes	6

Semi-finals
24 November 2019 – Badalona
Badalona Dracs	34
L'Hospitalet Pioners	7
24 November 2019 – Las Rozas
Las Rozas Black Demons	31
Coslada Camioneros	13

Final
14 December 2019 – El Masnou
Badalona Dracs	15
Las Rozas Black Demons	3
