= LNFA 2019 =

American football season in Spain

LNFA
- Season: 2019
- Champions: Badalona Dracs (10th title)

The 2019 LNFA season was the 25th season of American football in Spain. It began on 19 January 2019 and ended 25 May 2019 with the LNFA Bowl.

Badalona Dracs successfully defended their title from the previous season, defeating Las Rozas Black Demons in the LNFA Bowl.

== Competition format ==
For the 2019 season, the league was reduced to twelve teams. Valencia Giants, Santurtzi Coyotes, L'Hospitalet Pioners and Alicante Sharks declined to continue at Serie A, while Fuengirola Potros and Zaragoza Hurricanes joined the league.

The teams were divided into three groups of four, according to geographical criteria. All teams play eight games during the regular season: two games (home and away) against each other team in their group, plus two inter-group games (against one team of each other group).

At the end of the regular season, the eight best teams in the aggregate table qualify for the playoffs. Final position in the aggregate table will determine seeding for the playoffs.

== Tiebreakers ==
If two or more teams are tied at the end of the competition, the ranking of teams in each group is based on the following criteria:

1. Highest percentage of wins in games between tied teams.
2. Lowest percentage of points against in games between tied teams.
3. Highest difference between points scored and points against in games between tied teams.
4. Lowest percentage of points against in all the games.
5. Highest difference between points scored and points against in all the games.
6. Lowest percentage of sent off players in all the games.
7. Drawing of lots.

== Stadia and locations ==
Location of teams in LNFA 2019 Serie A

Fifteen teams entered the LNFA Serie A, the top-tier level of American football in Spain, after the changes in the competition format.

Team	Location	Stadium
Badalona Dracs	Badalona	Badalona Sud
Coslada Camioneros	Coslada	Valleaguado
Fuengirola Potros	Fuengirola	Polideportivo Elola
Gijón Mariners	Gijón	Las Mestas
Granada Lions	Maracena	Ciudad Deportiva
Las Rozas Black Demons	Las Rozas de Madrid	El Cantizal
Mallorca Voltors	Palma	Son Moix
Murcia Cobras	Murcia	José Barnés
Rivas Osos	Rivas Vaciamadrid	Cerro del Telégrafo
Santiago Black Ravens	Santiago de Compostela	Santa Isabel
Valencia Firebats	Valencia	Jardín del Turia
Zaragoza Hurricanes	Zaragoza	David Cañada

== Regular season ==
=== Northwest Group ===
Pos	Team	Pld	W	L	PF	PA	PD	PCT
1	Coslada Camioneros	8	7	1	238	66	+172	.875
2	Rivas Osos	8	6	2	293	99	+194	.750
3	Gijón Mariners	8	2	6	109	211	−102	.250
4	Santiago Black Ravens	8	0	8	16	349	−333	.000

Source: FEFA
Rules for classification: 1) Winning percentage; 2) Head-to-head results; 3) Points against per game

=== Northeast Group ===
Pos	Team	Pld	W	L	PF	PA	PD	PCT
1	Badalona Dracs	8	8	0	418	66	+352	1.000
2	Valencia Firebats	8	4	4	127	183	−56	.500
3	Mallorca Voltors	8	4	4	150	164	−14	.500
4	Zaragoza Hurricanes	8	2	6	79	236	−157	.250

Source: FEFA
Rules for classification: 1) Winning percentage; 2) Head-to-head results; 3) Points against per game

=== South Group ===
Pos	Team	Pld	W	L	PF	PA	PD	PCT
1	Las Rozas Black Demons	8	7	1	385	79	+306	.875
2	Murcia Cobras	8	6	2	261	138	+123	.750
3	Fuengirola Potros	8	2	6	119	265	−146	.250
4	Granada Lions	8	0	8	0	339	−339	.000

Source: FEFA
Rules for classification: 1) Winning percentage; 2) Head-to-head results; 3) Points against per game

=== Aggregate table ===
Pos	Grp	Team	Pld	W	L	PF	PA	PD	PCT	Qualification or relegation
1	NE	Badalona Dracs	8	8	0	418	66	+352	1.000	Advance to playoffs
2	NW	Coslada Camioneros	8	7	1	238	66	+172	.875	Advance to playoffs
3	S	Las Rozas Black Demons	8	7	1	385	79	+306	.875	Advance to playoffs
4	NW	Rivas Osos	8	6	2	293	99	+194	.750	Advance to playoffs
5	S	Murcia Cobras	8	6	2	261	138	+123	.750	Advance to playoffs
6	NE	Valencia Firebats	8	4	4	127	183	−56	.500	Advance to playoffs
7	NE	Mallorca Voltors	8	4	4	150	164	−14	.500	Advance to playoffs
8	NE	Zaragoza Hurricanes	8	2	6	79	236	−157	.250	Advance to playoffs
9	NW	Gijón Mariners	8	2	6	109	211	−102	.250	
10	S	Fuengirola Potros	8	2	6	119	265	−146	.250	
11	S	Granada Lions	8	0	8	0	339	−339	.000	
12	NW	Santiago Black Ravens	8	0	8	16	349	−333	.000	Relegated

Source: FEFA
Rules for classification: 1) Winning percentage; 2) Head-to-head results; 3) Points against per game

=== Results ===
Home \ Away	BAD	COS	FUE	GIJ	GRA	ROZ	MLL	MUR	RIV	SAN	VAL	ZAR
Badalona Dracs	—	—	—	—	—	—	54–6	49–26	—	—	58–8	54–0
Coslada Camioneros	—	—	46–18	28–0	—	—	—	—	21–14	47–0	—	—
Fuengirola Potros	—	—	—	—	52–0	8–64	0–41	8–26	—	—	—	—
Gijón Mariners	—	0–36	—	—	—	—	—	—	6–43	48–8	—	9–12
Granada Lions	—	—	0–13	—	—	0–58	—	0–48	0–61	—	—	—
Las Rozas Black Demons	—	—	47–20	24–6	49–0	—	—	41–6	—	—	—	—
Mallorca Voltors	7–48	—	—	—	18–0	—	—	—	—	—	6–33	14–7
Murcia Cobras	—	—	41–0	—	40–0	39–34	—	—	—	—	35–6	—
Rivas Osos	7–49	34–0	—	54–21	—	—	—	—	—	46–0	—	—
Santiago Black Ravens	—	0–42	—	6–19	—	0–68	—	—	2–40	—	—	—
Valencia Firebats	12–46	0–18	—	—	—	—	14–13	—	—	—	—	27–7
Zaragoza Hurricanes	0–60	—	—	—	—	—	8–45	—	—	45–0	0–27	—

Source: LNFA
Legend: Blue = home team win; Red = away team win.

== Playoffs ==
Quarterfinals
14 April – Badalona
Badalona Dracs (1)	49
Zaragoza Hurricanes (8)	0
27 April – Rivas Vaciamadrid
Rivas Osos (4)	41
Murcia Cobras (5)	61
28 April – Coslada
Coslada Camioneros (2)	21
Mallorca Voltors (7)	13
28 April – Las Rozas de Madrid
Las Rozas Black Demons (3)	63
Valencia Firebats (6)	40

Semifinals
11/12 May – Badalona
Badalona Dracs (1)	40
Murcia Cobras (5)	20
11/12 May - Coslada
Coslada Camioneros (2)	13
Las Rozas Black Demons (3)	33

LNFA Bowl
25 May – Murcia
Badalona Dracs (1)	47
Las Rozas Black Demons (3)	6

== Copa de España ==
Prior to the season, the Copa de España was played between the five teams that registered in the competition.

Badalona Dracs retained the title and achieved their fourth trophy ever.

The final was played at Estadio Pedro Escartín in Guadalajara.

First round
17 November 2018 – Gijón
Gijón Mariners	14
Murcia Cobras	6

Semifinals
1 December 2018 – Las Rozas
Las Rozas Black Demons	21
Coslada Camioneros	7
2 December 2018 – Badalona
Badalona Dracs	47
Gijón Mariners	10

Final
16 December 2018 – Guadalajara
Las Rozas Black Demons	0
Badalona Dracs	24
