= LNFA 2013 =

American football season in Spain

The LNFA 2013 season was the 19th season of top-tier American football in Spain. The season began with the Spanish Cup on November 11, 2012, and finished with the LNFA final on June 2, 2013.

== LNFA Elite ==
Six teams entered the LNFA Elite, the top-tier level of American football in Spain. L'Hospitalet Pioners, Rivas Osos, Valencia Firebats and Badalona Dracs repeated from last year. Las Rozas Black Demons and Valencia Giants were promoted from last year LNFA.

Legend
The four top teams will qualify for the championship play-offs
The fifth place will compete in the promotion/relegation play-off
The last team will be relegated to the LNFA next season

Team	P	W	T	L	PF	PA	Dif
L'Hospitalet Pioners	10	9	0	1	67	6	+61
Badalona Dracs	10	8	1	1	55	22	+33
Valencia Giants	10	4	1	5	44	12	+32
Valencia Firebats	10	4	0	6	15	48	−33
Rivas Osos	10	3	0	7	13	63	−50
Las Rozas Black Demons	10	1	0	9	12	55	−43

	BLA	DRA	FIR	GIA	OSO	PIO
Las Rozas Black Demons		6–14	13–41	16–32	20–31	7–33
Badalona Dracs	47–7		27−9	28–3	16–0	6–0
Valencia Firebats	48–21	12–28		6−21	14–13	28–31
Valencia Giants	23−6	22–22	26–43		39–21	13–19
Rivas Osos	13–14	13−28	29–6	29–18		0−35
L'Hospitalet Pioners	32−6	48–12	34–27	78–12	48–0	

=== Playoffs ===
The four top teams will play for the 2012 LNFA title. The semifinals will be 1st vs. 4th and 2nd vs. 3rd. The games will be played in the home of the highest seed.

Semifinals
1	L'Hospitalet Pioners	26
4	Valencia Firebats	21
2	Badalona Dracs	35
3	Valencia Giants	6

Finals
1	L'Hospitalet Pioners	24
2	Badalona Dracs	0

Relegation playoff
Rivas Osos	34
Barberá Rookies	0

== LNFA ==
Twelve teams entered the LNFA, the second level of American football in Spain. They were divided in four conferences.

Each team played twice against the other two teams of its conference and four more games against two teams of different conferences.

=== Regular season ===
==== North Conference ====
Team	P	W	T	L	PF	PA	Dif
Gijón Mariners	8	7	1	0	149	42	+107
Coyotes Santurtzi	8	4	0	4	120	67	+53
Cantabria Bisons	8	0	0	8	12	200	–188

==== South Conference ====
Team	P	W	T	L	PF	PA	Dif
Murcia Cobras	8	4	0	4	122	105	+17
Granada Lions	8	4	0	4	97	104	–7
Sevilla Linces	8	1	0	7	39	157	–118

==== East Conference ====
Team	P	W	T	L	PF	PA	Dif
Barcelona Búfals	8	6	0	2	80	32	+48
Barberà Rookies	8	6	0	2	96	68	+28
Mallorca Voltors	8	3	0	5	93	81	+12

==== Center Conference ====
Team	P	W	T	L	PF	PA	Dif
Zaragoza Hornets	8	5	1	2	100	74	+26
Camioneros Coslada	8	4	0	4	122	81	+41
Zaragoza Hurricanes	8	3	0	5	65	84	–19

=== Playoffs ===
The eight top teams will compete for the promotion to the LNFA Elite. The LNFA champions will promote, while the runner-up will play the promotion playoff against the fifth team in the LNFA Elite.

Quarter-finals
1	Gijón Mariners	27
8	Murcia Cobras	13
4	Granada Lions	42
5	Barcelona Búfals	12
2	Barberá Rookies	28
7	Camioneros Coslada	0
3	Zaragoza Hornets	28
6	Coyotes Santurtzi	0

Semi-finals
1	Gijón Mariners	14
4	Granada Lions	16
2	Barberá Rookies	5
3	Zaragoza Hornets	0

Final
4	Granada Lions	13
2	Barberá Rookies	3
