= LNFA 2009 =

American football season in Spain

The 2009 LNFA season is the XV since its foundation in 1995. The Copa de España de Fútbol Americano also is held and is the second competition most important.

== Regular season ==
- The regular season started the 24 January and finished the 10 May.
- At finish of regular season, the first two accessing directly to semifinals.
- 3rd, 4th, 5th and 6th classified, plays a two-leg for accessing to semifinals.

=== Regular season final standings ===
LNFA 2009
Position	Team	Wins	Losses	points for	points against	points diff.
1	Badalona Dracs	8	1	307	59	+248
2	L'Hospitalet Pioners	8	1	319	57	+262
3	Valencia Firebats	8	1	303	102	+201
4	Rivas Osos	6	3	279	192	+87
5	Gijón Mariners	4	5	191	270	-79
6	Barcelona Búfals	4	5	159	248	-89
7	Las Rozas Black Demons	3	6	196	205	-9
8	Sevilla Linces	3	6	180	245	-87
9	Coslada Camioneros	1	8	130	282	-152
10	Granada Lions	0	9	35	439	-404

advancing to semifinals	from quarter-finals

=== Play-offs ===
Quarter-finals (16-05-2009)
Rivas Osos	34
Gijón Mariners	17
-
-
-
-
Barcelona Búfals	0
Valencia Firebats	41

Semifinals (23-05-2009)
Rivas Osos	7
Badalona Dracs	21
L'Hospitalet Pioners	26
Valencia Firebats	29

Final (06-06-2009)
Badalona Dracs	10
Valencia Firebats	29

== 2009 Copa de España ==
Quarter-finals (21-12-2008)
Rivas Osos	34
Las Rozas Black Demons	7
-
-
-
-
Barcelona Búfals	7
Badalona Dracs	10

Semifinals (10-01-2009)
Rivas Osos	21
Valencia Firebats	20
L'Hospitalet Pioners	7
Badalona Dracs	9

Final (07-02-2009)
Rivas Osos	7
Badalona Dracs	0

=== Final information ===
Date	Champion	runner-up	Score	Stadium
7 February 2009 (15:00) (CEST+2)	Rivas Osos	Badalona Dracs	7-0	Estadio Cerro del Telégrafo
