= 2012 Copa de España de Fútbol Americano =

Spain's american football cup 2013 was the 18th edition of the Cup.

The six LNFA Elite teams entered the competition. L'Hospitalet Pioners and Rivas Osos, as champions and runners-up of last season LNFA Elite, received a bye to the semifinals. The quarter-finals were played on November 11 and November 18. The semifinals will be played on December 2.

L'Hospitalet Pioners are the current title holders.

Quarterfinals
Las Rozas Black Demons	16
Badalona Dracs	9
Valencia Giants	6
Valencia Firebats	25

Semifinals
Las Rozas Black Demons	14
L'Hospitalet Pioners	24
Valencia Firebats	14
Rivas Osos	19

Final
L'Hospitalet Pioners	20
Rivas Osos	10
