= LNFA 2 =

American football league in Spain

- Sport: American football
- Founded: 2004
- Folded: 2009
- No. of teams: 11 (2009)
- Country: Spain & Portugal
- Last champion: Reus Imperials (2009)
- Website: https://web.archive.org/web/20081012113709/http://www.aefaweb.com/

LNFA 2 (initials of Liga Nacional de Fútbol Americano 2) was the name of the second most important american football league in Spain, behind LNFA, and Portugal´s most important at the time.

The league was run by the Spanish Association of American Football (Agrupación Española de Futbol Americano (AEFA) in Spanish language).

It was established in 2004 and folded in 2009.

It was played under nine-man football rules.

== History ==
Year	Champion	Runner-up	Bowl game result
2004	Barcelona Uroloki	Zaragoza Lions	26–18
2005	Barcelona Uroloki	Las Rozas Black Demons	52–32
2006	Las Rozas Black Demons	Terrassa Reds	38–18
2007	Reus Imperials	Argentona Bocs	15–12
2008	Reus Imperials	Valencia Giants	16–10
2009	Reus Imperials	Valencia Giants	20–14

== Last season (2009) ==
11 teams divided into two conferences competed in the league's last season, in 2009.

LNFA 2
Northern Conference
Team	Website
Reus Imperials (Spain)	http://www.imperialsreus.com
Santurtzi Coyotes (Spain)	https://web.archive.org/web/20190318190109/http://www.coyotes-santurtzi.com/
Barberá Rookies (Spain)	https://web.archive.org/web/20170918154741/http://barberarookies.com/
Lisboa Navigators (Portugal)	https://web.archive.org/web/20140816151521/http://lisboanavigators.pt/
Vilafranca Eagles (Spain)	https://web.archive.org/web/20081010041308/http://www.vilafrancaeagles.net/
Oporto Renegades (Portugal)	http://www.portorenegades.com
Southern Conference
Team	Website
Valencia Giants (Spain)	https://web.archive.org/web/20171013194658/http://www.valenciagiants.com/
Vinaroz Ironmans (Spain)	http://www.clubironmans.es/
Sueca Ricers (Spain)	http://www.suecaricers.es
Murcia Cobras (Spain)	http://www.murciacobras.com
Marbella Suns (Spain)	https://web.archive.org/web/20081113122509/http://www.sunsfootball.org/

=== Final play-offs ===
Quarter-finals (9-05-2009)
Lisboa Navigators	51
Vinaroz Ironmans	0
-
-
-
-
Murcia Cobras	13
Barberá Rookies	21

Semifinals (16-05-2009)
Reus Imperials	32
Barberá Rookies	16
Valencia Giants	19
Lisboa Navigators	13

Final (23-05-2009)
Valencia Giants	14
Reus Imperials	20
