= Copa de España de Fútbol Americano 2014 =

Copa de España de Fútbol Americano 2014 (Spain's American Football Cup) was the 19th edition of the Cup.

Seven teams entered the competition. L'Hospitalet Pioners won the title for the fifth time in a row and ninth overall.

Wild card
6 November – Santurtzi
Coyotes Santurtzi	6
Las Rozas Black Demons	12

Quarterfinals
17 November – Las Rozas
Las Rozas Black Demons	21
Valencia Giants	17
16 November – Rivas-Vaciamadrid
Rivas Osos	22
Valencia Firebats	20

Semifinals
24 November – Las Rozas
Las Rozas Black Demons	13
Badalona Dracs	31
23 November – Rivas-Vaciamadrid
Rivas Osos	8
L'Hospitalet Pioners	15

Final
7 December – Badalona
Badalona Dracs	27
L'Hospitalet Pioners	31
