= LNFA 1995 =

American football season in Spain

The LNFA 1995 was the first season of the new American football league in Spain. It was the result of the merger between two previous leagues.

18 teams were divided in two conferences. The Conferencia Nacional (National Conference), with the teams from the defunct American Football League, and the Conferencia Española (Spanish Conference), formed by the teams from the Catalan league.

== Regular season ==
=== National conference ===
Team	W	L	D	
Madrid Panteras	8	1	0	Quarterfinals
Vilafranca Eagles	7	1	1	Quarterfinals
Zaragoza Lions	6	2	1	Wild Card
Madrid Osos	5	4	0	Wild Card
Coslada Camioneros	4	5	0	Wild Card
Valencia Bats	4	5	0	Wild Card
Bilbao Knights	3	6	0	
Madrid Toros	3	6	0	
Maestrat Tifons	0	9	0	

=== Spanish Conference ===
Team	W	L	D	
Barcelona Boxers	9	0	0	Quarterfinals
L'Hospitalet Pioners	8	1	0	Quarterfinals
Barcelona Howlers	6	3	0	Wild card
Badalona Drags	5	4	0	Wild card
Poble Nou Búfals	4	5	0	Wild card
Palma Voltors	4	5	0	Wild card
Barcelona Warriors	3	6	0	
Castellón Stormers	1	8	0	
Horta Taurons	0	9	0	

== Playoffs ==
Wild Card
Badalona Drags	12
Camioneros Coslada	6
Zaragoza Lions	35
Palma Voltors	12
Madrid Osos	38
Poble Nou Búfals	31
Barcelona Howlers	58
Valencia Bats	16

Quarterfinals
Madrid Panteras	61
Badalona Drags	0
L'Hospitalet Pioners	34
Zaragoza Lions	39
Barcelona Bóxers	31
Madrid Osos	12
Vilafranca Eagles	20
Barcelona Howlers	30

Semifinals
Madrid Panteras	51
Zaragoza Lions	12
Barcelona Bóxers	20
Barcelona Howlers	14

Final
May 14
Madrid Panteras	55
Barcelona Bóxers	28
