= Copa de España de Fútbol Americano =

- Founded: 1995
- Region: Spain
- Number of teams: Variable
- Current champions: Las Rozas Black Demons (3rd title)
- Most successful club(s): L'Hospitalet Pioners (9 titles)
- 2024 Copa de España

The Copa de España de Fútbol Americano (Spanish Cup of American Football) is an annual cup competition for Spanish gridiron teams. Founded in 1995, it is the second most important gridiron competition in Spain, after the league.

== History ==
Season	Date	Champion	Runners-up	Score
1996		Madrid Panteras	Vilafranca Eagles	20–16
1997		Madrid Panteras	L'Hospitalet Pioners	24–17
1998		Madrid Panteras	L'Hospitalet Pioners	17–6
1999		Badalona Dracs	Bilbao Cougars	8–6
2000		L'Hospitalet Pioners	Badalona Dracs	34–13
2001		Rivas Osos	Badalona Dracs	25–24
2002		Rivas Osos	Badalona Dracs	39–12
2003		Rivas Osos	Badalona Dracs	15–6
2004		Badalona Dracs	Rivas Osos	3–0
2005		L'Hospitalet Pioners	Valencia Firebats	23–16
2006		L'Hospitalet Pioners	Rivas Osos	23–18
2007		Rivas Osos	L'Hospitalet Pioners	20–3
2008		L'Hospitalet Pioners	Rivas Osos	14–13
2009		Rivas Osos	Badalona Dracs	7–0
2010		L'Hospitalet Pioners	Las Rozas Black Demons	41–7
2011		L'Hospitalet Pioners	Valencia Firebats	46–23
2012		L'Hospitalet Pioners	Badalona Dracs	36–29
2013		L'Hospitalet Pioners	Rivas Osos	20–10
2014		L'Hospitalet Pioners	Badalona Dracs	31–27
2015	not held			
2016		Badalona Dracs		
2017		Badalona Dracs	Las Rozas Black Demons	26–7
2018		Badalona Dracs	Las Rozas Black Demons	24–0
2019	15 December 2019	Badalona Dracs	Las Rozas Black Demons	15–3
2020/21	26 June 2021	Badalona Dracs	Las Rozas Black Demons	14–7
2021	18 December 2021	Rivas Osos	Badalona Dracs	41–14
2022	17 December 2022	Las Rozas Black Demons	Badalona Dracs	17–0
2023	16 December 2023	Las Rozas Black Demons	Badalona Dracs	27–21
2024	4 January 2025	Las Rozas Black Demons	Badalona Dracs	35–0

=== Results by team ===
Spanish American football cup winners by team
Team	Winners	Runners-up	Years won	Years runner-up	Final appearances
L'Hospitalet Pioners	9	3	1999, 2004, 2005, 2007, 2009, 2010, 2011, 2012, 2013	1996, 1997, 2006	12
Badalona Dracs	7	11	1998, 2003, 2016, 2017, 2018, 2019, 2020/21	1999, 2000, 2001, 2002, 2008, 2011, 2013, 2021, 2022, 2023, 2024	18
Rivas Osos	6	4	2000, 2001, 2002, 2006, 2008, 2021	2003, 2005, 2007, 2012	10
Madrid Panteras	3	0	1995, 1996, 1997		3
Las Rozas Black Demons	3	5	2022, 2023, 2024	2009, 2017, 2018, 2019, 2020/21	8
Valencia Firebats	0	2		2004, 2010	2
Vilafranca Eagles	0	1		1995	1
Bilbao Cougars	0	1		1998	1
