= LNFA 2010 =

American football season in Spain

The 2010 season of the LNFA was the 16th season of top-tier American football in Spain. In the 2010 season the league expanded to 15 teams, divided into three conferences of five teams each. The Conferencia Española included the five top teams of the 2009 season. At the end of the regular season, the top two of the Conferencia Española acceded directly to the semifinals for the title, and faced the winners of the playoff between wild cards.

== Conferencia Española ==
P	Team	W	L	D	P+	P−	Play-off
1	L'Hospitalet Pioners	7	1	0	264	94	Semi-finals
2	Badalona Dracs	6	2	0	301	117	Semi-finals
3	Valencia Firebats	5	3	0	206	123	Quarter-finals
4	Rivas Osos	2	6	0	147	274	Quarter-finals
5	Gijón Mariners	0	8	0	29	339	

== Conferencia Nacional ==
P	Team	W	L	D	P+	P−	Play-off
1	Barcelona Bufals	8	0	0	232	42	Quarter-finals
2	Sueca Ricers	4	4	0	99	115	
3	Marbella Sharks	3	4	1	114	95	
4	Coslada Camioneros	3	5	0	95	195	
5	Granada Lions	1	6	1	74	167	

== Conferencia Hispanica ==
P	Team	W	L	D	P+	P−	Play-off
1	Las Rozas Black Demons	6	1	1	283	95	Quarter-finals
2	Valencia Giants	6	2	0	164	88	
3	Santurce Coyotes	4	4	0	65	141	
4	Zaragoza Hurricanes	3	4	1	90	127	
5	Sevilla Linces	0	8	0	26	177	

== Play-offs ==
Quarter-finals (22-05-2010)
Rivas Osos	9
Barcelona Búfals	6
-
-
-
-
Las Rozas Black Demons	20
Valencia Firebats	27

Semi-finals (30-05-2010)
Rivas Osos	0
L'Hospitalet Pioners	69
Badalona Dracs	21
Valencia Firebats	27

Final (13-06-2010)
L'Hospitalet Pioners	36
Valencia Firebats	0

== See also ==
- LNFA
