= Sean Bedford =

American football player (born 1987)

No. 79
- Position: Center

Personal information
- Born: December 26, 1987 (age 38); San Jose, California, U.S.
- Listed height: 6 ft 1 in (1.85 m)
- Listed weight: 281 lb (127 kg)

Career information
- High school: Gainesville Buchholz (Gainesville, Florida)
- College: Georgia Tech (2006–2010)
- NFL draft: 2011: undrafted

Career history
- Rivas Osos (2011)

Awards and highlights
- Burlsworth Trophy (2010); First-team All-ACC (2010)

Sean Boudreau Bedford (born December 26, 1987) is an American former football center. Bedford played one season as the starting center for Rivas Osos, a Spanish football team in the Liga Nacional de Fútbol Americano. He started his college football career with the Georgia Tech Yellow Jackets as a walk-on and went on to win the very first Burlsworth Trophy.

== College career ==
Bedford walked on to Georgia Tech in 2006 without any Division I scholarship offers to play football. Bedford would redshirt in 2006, serve as a member of the scout team in 2007 and worked his way up to being the primary center backup in 2008.

Bedford was awarded a scholarship from head coach Paul Johnson following spring practice in 2009. He grabbed the starting job at center in spring practice and went on to start all 14 games in 2009 on the way to being named first team All-ACC.

In 2010, Bedford was named the first-ever recipient of the Burlsworth Trophy, given to the top player in Division I FBS who began their career as a walk-on.

Bedford majored in Aerospace Engineering at Georgia Tech. In 2010, he was named one of the 20 smartest athlete in sports by Sporting News. In 2013, he was named to CBS Sports' All-Walk-On Team and included in the 25 Greatest Walk-Ons of the BCS Era by Bleacher Report.

== Professional career ==
Coming out of college, Bedford was signed for the 2011 season by Rivas Osos, a semi-pro team in Spain, to play the LNFA.

== Post-football career ==
After returning to the United States from Spain, Bedford attended the University of Florida Levin College of Law and graduated in 2014. Sean was an associate in the intellectual property practice of Alston and Bird, LLP, until 2021 when he became General Counsel of Masten Space Systems. Sean is now the Director of Business Development at Astrobotic Technology.

Sean spent several years as the color commentator for the IMG Radio Network Georgia Tech football broadcasts.
