= Gijón Mariners =

Helmet
Logo

General information
- Founded: 2001
- Stadium: Las Mestas
- Headquartered: Gijón, Asturias, Spain
- Colors: Green black White
- Website: gijonmariners.net

Personnel
- General manager: Enrique Prado Alonso
- Head coach: Ignacio Fernández

League / conference affiliations
- LNFA; Northwest Division

Championships
- Serie C: 1; 2025

Current uniform
Home

Away

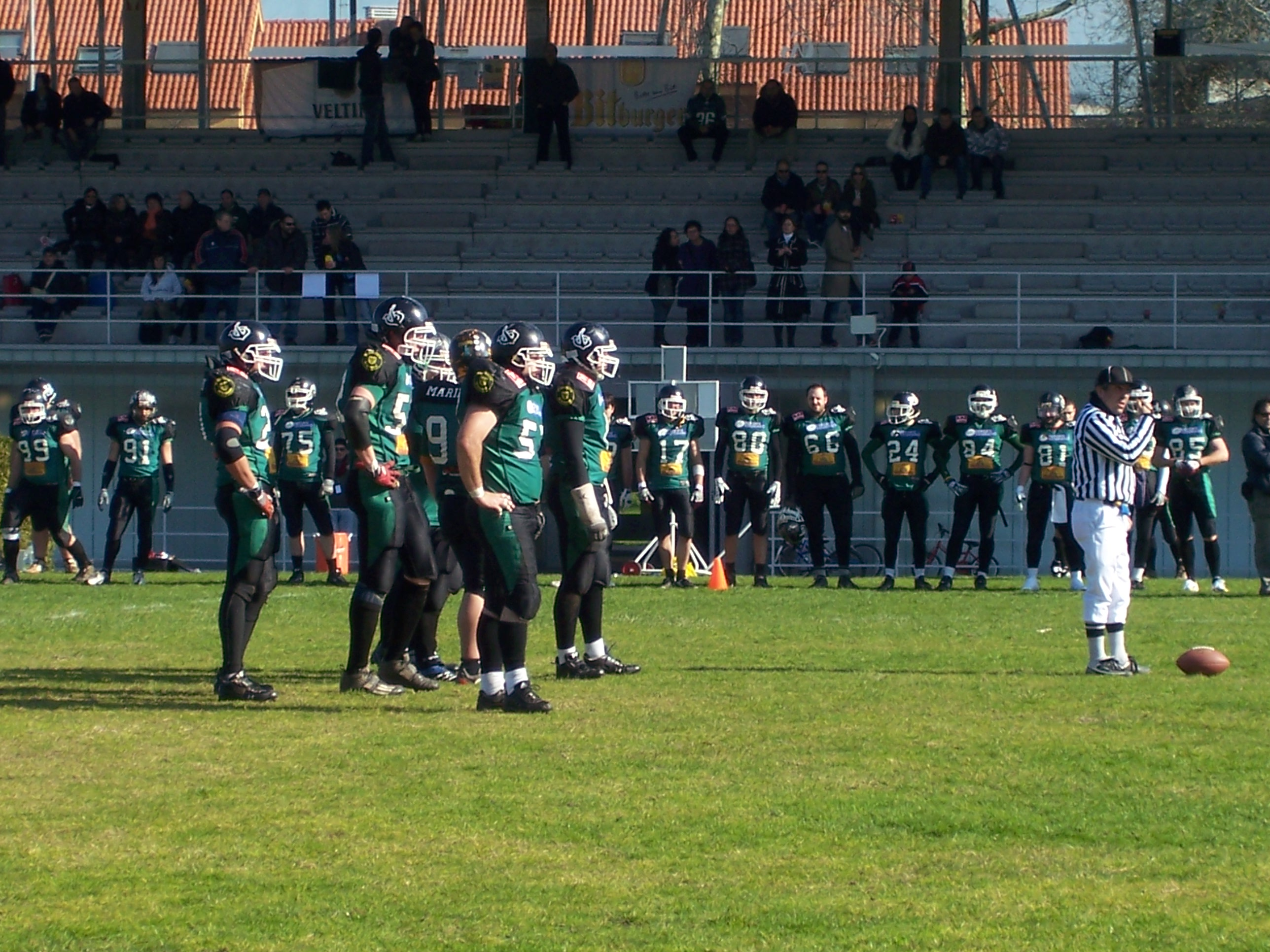
Players at a home game

Former logo, used until 2018.

The Gijón Mariners are an American football team based in Gijón, Asturias (Spain).

== History ==
The team was established in 2001 by a group of players of flag football at the beach. They joined the Spanish league for the 2006 season, and got included on the Western Conference of the LNFA 2. They played their first game ever on that competition February 19, 2006, against Zaragoza Hurricanes with a score against of 60–6. On their second season, again in the LNFA 2, they qualified for the play-offs and only lost on the last round (semi-finals) for the championship bowl.

The success of the merchandise finally made it possible to reach the top competition, the LNFA, on the 2008 season. They finished with a 4–4 (Won-Lost) record, the best ever for a rookie team on the league's history.

== Records ==
Season	Tier	League	Pos.	RS	PO	Cup
2006	2	LNFA 2		0–0–6		
2007	2	LNFA 2		3–1–3	1–1	
2008	1	LNFA	5th	4–0–4		Quarterfinalist
2009	1	LNFA	6th	4–0–5	0–1	
2010	1	LNFA	7th	0–0–8		
2011	1	LNFA	14th	1–0–7		
2012	2	LNFA	9th	4–1–3		
2013	2	LNFA	3rd	7–1–0	1–1	
2014	2	Serie B	8th	4–4	0–1	
2015	3	Serie C	1st	6–0	3–0	
2016	2	Serie B	4th	3–3	1–1	
2017	2	Serie B	5th	4–4		
2018	1	Serie A	7th	4–4	1–1	
2019	1	Serie A	9th	2–6		Semifinalist
2020	1	Serie A	(Note: Season curtailed due to COVID-19 pandemic.)	0–5		Quarterfinalist
2021	1	Serie A	8th	0–8		Semifinalist
2022	1	Serie A	5th	3–3		
2023	1	Serie A	6th	3–5		
2024	1	Serie A	8th	2–6		Quarterfinalist
2025	1	Serie A	9th	2–6		

== Trophies ==
- Serie C: (1)
  - 2015

== International agreements ==
In 2012 Gijón Mariners reached an agreement with Pumas Dorados de la UNAM to exchange players and coaches from both clubs, as well as to share guidelines and training plans.

== Featured players ==
- (United States) Mark James Murray, from Marbella Sharks.
- (Spain) Nadir Mutti, from Parma Panthers (IFL).

== Ring of Fame ==
- (Mexico) Mauricio Diago Jaworski, ex-player of Borregos Salvajes (ITESM), Campus Estado de México (ONEFA), Rivas Osos (LNFA) and Pieles Rojas (LNM).
- (Mexico) Jesús E. Sánchez, ex-player of Pumas UNAM CU (ONEFA) and Rivas Osos (LNFA).
- (Austria) Alex Stolz, ex-player of Tirol Raiders (AFL).
- (Spain) Sergi Güibas, ex-player of Borregos Salvajes, Campus Toluca (ONEFA) and Badalona Dracs (LNFA).
- (Mexico) David Lozano, ex-player of Centinelas CGP (ONEFA) and Palermo Corsari (IFL).
- (Mexico) Marco Antonio Pacheco Patraca, ex-player of Centinelas CGP (ONEFA) and Troyanos (LNM).
