= Brian Wilbur =

American football player (born 1986)

No. 15 – Granada Lions
- Position: Quarterback

Personal information
- Born: October 26, 1986 (age 40); Boring, Oregon
- Listed height: 6 ft 1 in (1.85 m)
- Listed weight: 200 lb (91 kg)

Career history
- Granada Lions (2007); Granada Lions (2010); Montpellier Hurricanes (2013); Granada Lions (2014)

Awards and highlights
- AAFA Championship Game MVP; 2010 AAFA league MVP

Brian Andrew Wilbur (born October 26, 1986, in Boring, Oregon) is an American football player and was the starting quarterback for the Granada Lions of the Asocación Andaluza de Fútbol Americano, for whom he has played in three separate seasons: 2007, 2010, and 2014.

== Early career ==
Wilbur played football at 3A powerhouse Ferndale High School in Ferndale, Washington. He went on to attend the University of Puget Sound, but chose not to play college football, concentrating on lacrosse instead, where he earned multiple all-conference awards as the starting goalkeeper for the Loggers.

== International career ==
Wilbur began playing football in Granada while studying abroad in 2007. After graduation from college, he returned in 2010 for a second season and was named the 2010 Andalucian league MVP.

Wilbur was recruited by the Montpellier Hurricanes of France to serve as quarterback and offensive coordinator for the 2013 season.

In 2014, he was again called up by the Granada Lions to serve as quarterback after the Lions qualified for the Serie A of Spain's national football league.
