= Marbella Suns =

American football team based in Spain

Helmet
Logo

General information
- Founded: 2006
- Folded: 2009
- Stadium: Estadio Municipal de Arroyo Primero
- Headquartered: Marbella, Spain
- Colors: Gold Black

Marbella Suns is a defunct American football team that was based in Marbella, Andalusia (Spain).

== History ==
The team was established in 2006 as Manilva Suns, when they started playing in Manilva, moving the franchise later on to Marbella. Finnish player Juri Jurvanen was behind the foundation of the team, acting as president and head coach at the same time. Former Colorado player Zac Colvin helped out from the field as a quarterback to lead the team into major Spanish competition.

In 2009, the team ceased activity.
