= Cantabria Bisons =

American football team from Santander, Spain

Helmet
Logo

General information
- Founded: 2011
- Stadium: Complejo Municipal de Deportes de La Albericia
- Headquartered: Santander, Spain
- Colors: Black White Red

Personnel
- Head coach: Manuel Vigo
- President: Cristian Mato Rojo

League / conference affiliations
- LNFA; North (Serie C)

Cantabria Bisons is an American football team based in Santander, Spain.

The Bisons compete in LNFA Serie B, the second-tier division of American football in Spain.

== Season to season ==
Season	Tier	Division	Conference	Record	Cup
2013	2	LNFA	North	0–0–8	Did not enter
2014	2	Serie B	North	0–0–8	Did not enter
2015	3	Serie C	North	5–5	Did not enter
