= Las Mestas Sports Complex =

Sporting venue in Spain

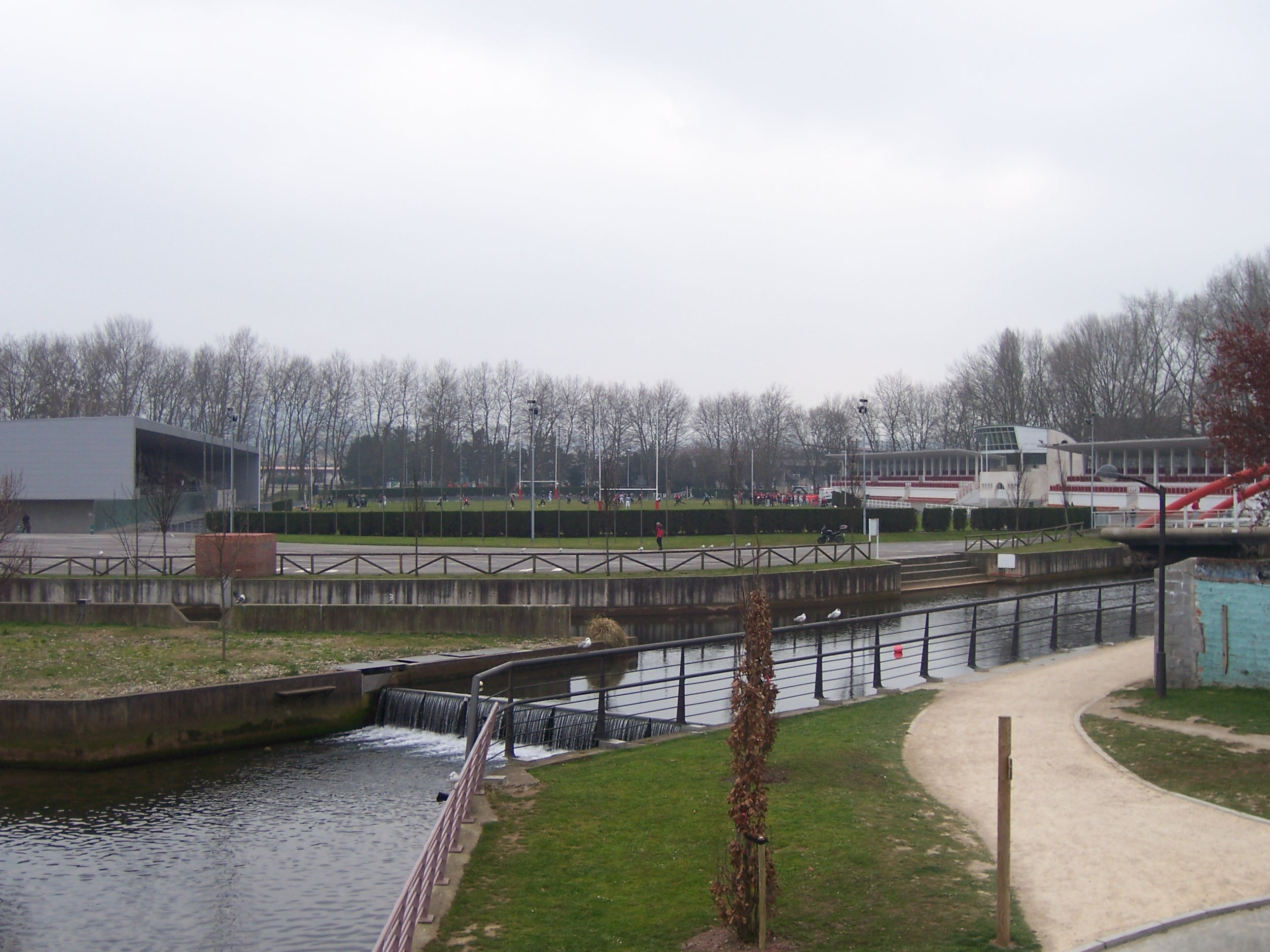
- Front view since the River Piles
- Interactive map of Las Mestas Sports Complex
- Location: Gijón, Asturias
- Coordinates: 43°31′54″N 5°38′9″W
- Owner: Gijón City Hall
- Capacity: 10,000
- Surface: Natural Grass
- Field size: 135×78 m

Construction
- Opened: 1942
- Renovated: 2005

Tenants
- CSI Gijón; Gijón Mariners; Gijón RC

Las Mestas Sports Complex (Asturian: Complexu Deportivu Les Mestes) is a multipurpose sports complex in Gijón, Asturias (Spain), used mainly as an equestrian facility for show jumping. It is also used as a velodrome, with its 428 m long track, and as a rugby and American football stadium.

It was inaugurated in 1942 and renovated in 2005. Las Mestas has a capacity of 10,000 people, 3,000 of them seated.

== History ==
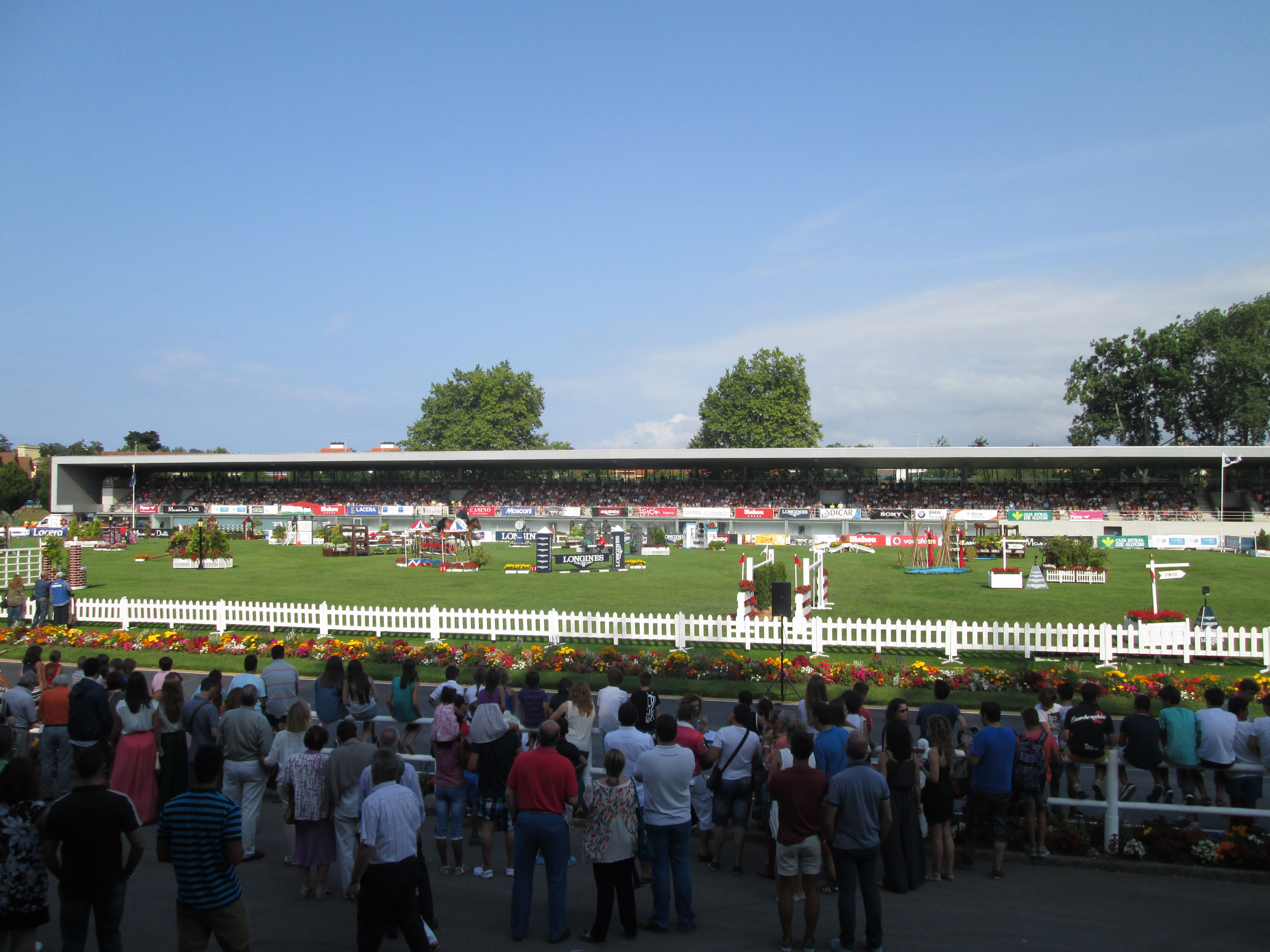
The new tribune, built in 2005, during the CSIO Gijón 2014

Inaugurated in 1942, the original use for Las Mestas was exclusively for equestrian competitions.

On 27 August 1964, a stand collapsed, ironically injuring 27 people.

The stadium has been renovated several times, the last time being in 2005 with the addition of a new covered section with 2,200 seats.

== Uses ==
- CSI Gijón, Spain's Official Show Jumping Horse Show, part of the FEI Nations Cup Promotional League.
- Home field of the Gijon Mariners (American football).
- Velodrome.
- Concerts.

== Sporting events ==
- 1993 European Show Jumping Championships.
- 1999 Samsung Nations Cup World Final.
- 2006 LNFA Bowl
- 2007 Copa del Rey de Rugby final.
- 2008 Inline speed skating World Cup.
- 2011 ITU Duathlon World Championships
- 2018 LNFA Bowl

== International rugby union games held ==
14 February 2010	Spain	5 – 10	England A	Women's friendly game

23 February 2013	Spain	29 – 19	Nomads	Women's friendly game

23 February 2013	Spain	15 – 25	Romania	2012–14 ENC First Division
	Try: Lionel Pardo (46'), César Sempere (78'); Con: Corey Simpsons (46'); Pen: Corey Simpsons (19')	Team Sheet	Try: Cătălin Fercu (22'); Con: Florin Vlaicu (22'); Pen: Florin Vlaicu 6 (6', 12', 17', 29', 49', 67'); Cards: Mihai Macovei	Attendance: 4,500; Referee: (Italy) Giuseppe Vivarini

== Concerts ==
- 16 June 2006 — Colombian singer Shakira performed at the venue during her Fijación Oral Tour.
