= Liga Nacional de Fútbol Americano =

American football league in Spain

- Current season, competition or edition: LNFA 2025
- Sport: American football
- Founded: (1988) rebranded in 1995
- No. of teams: 10
- Country: Spain
- Most recent champions: Las Rozas Black Demons (4th title)
- Most titles: Badalona Dracs (11 titles)
- Website: LNFA Serie A

Former logo

Liga Nacional de Fútbol Americano (LNFA) is the name of the top gridiron league which operates in Spain. It was first founded in 1988 and reorganized in 1995 after the merge of several previous Spanish competitions.

The league is run by the Spanish Federation of American Football (Federación Española de Futbol Americano (FEFA) in Spanish language).

At the end of the season, league champion and runner up clinch bids to compete at next year's European Football League, while third and fourth teams classify for the EFAF Cup.

There has been changes in the number of teams throughout the years. Since 2015, teams are divided into three categories: Serie A, with the top six teams, second tier Serie B with ten teams competing in two conferences, and Serie C, with regional and interregional leagues.

== History ==
=== LNFA Bowl results ===
Year	Final Host	Champion	Runner-up	Score
1995	Madrid	Madrid Panteras	Barcelona Boxers	55–28
1996	Madrid	Madrid Panteras	Vilafranca Eagles	21–17
1997	Barcelona	Vilafranca Eagles	Madrid Panteras	40–20
1998		Badalona Drags	L'Hospitalet Pioners	13–7
1999	Coslada	Badalona Drags	Rivas Osos	52–12
2000		Granollers Fénix	Badalona Drags	8–0
2001		Rivas Osos	Zaragoza Lions	21–7
2002		Badalona Drags	Rivas Osos	14–8
2003		Badalona Drags	L'Hospitalet Pioners	30–20
2004		Badalona Drags	L'Hospitalet Pioners	23–0
2005	L'Hospitalet de Llobregat	L'Hospitalet Pioners	Badalona Dracs	24–13
2006	Gijón	Valencia Firebats	L'Hospitalet Pioners	13–0
2007		Valencia Firebats	Badalona Dracs	47–21
2008	Seville	L'Hospitalet Pioners	Valencia Firebats	36–17
2009	Valencia	Valencia Firebats	Badalona Dracs	29–10
2010	Argentona	L'Hospitalet Pioners	Valencia Firebats	36–0
2011	Barcelona	L'Hospitalet Pioners	Badalona Dracs	24–8
2012	Rivas-Vaciamadrid	L'Hospitalet Pioners	Rivas Osos	47–24
2013	L'Hospitalet de Llobregat	L'Hospitalet Pioners	Badalona Dracs	24–0
2014	Badalona	Badalona Dracs	Valencia Firebats	24–18
2015	Badalona	Valencia Firebats	Badalona Dracs	30–20
2016	Calatayud	Badalona Dracs	Valencia Firebats	41–14
2017	Reus	Badalona Dracs	Reus Imperials	56–14
2018	Gijón	Badalona Dracs	Murcia Cobras	33–26
2019	Murcia	Badalona Dracs	Las Rozas Black Demons	47–6
2020	Season abandoned due to the COVID-19 pandemic			
2021	Badalona	Badalona Dracs	Las Rozas Black Demons	31–21
2022	Rivas-Vaciamadrid	Rivas Osos	Las Rozas Black Demons	28–12
2023	Las Rozas de Madrid	Las Rozas Black Demons	Rivas Osos	22–13
2024	Madrid	Las Rozas Black Demons	Rivas Osos	27–23
2025	Badalona	Las Rozas Black Demons	Badalona Dracs	36–14
2026	Badalona	Las Rozas Black Demons	Badalona Dracs	27–13

=== LNFA Bowl appearances ===
Team	Winners	Runners-up	Winning years
Badalona Dracs	11	9	1998, 1999, 2002, 2003, 2004, 2014, 2016, 2017, 2018, 2019, 2021
L'Hospitalet Pioners	6	4	2005, 2008, 2010, 2011, 2012, 2013
Valencia Firebats	4	4	2006, 2007, 2009, 2015
Las Rozas Black Demons	4	3	2023, 2024, 2025, 2026
Rivas Osos	2	5	2001, 2022
Madrid Panteras	2	1	1995, 1996
Vilafranca Eagles	1	1	1997
Granollers Fénix	1	0	2000
Murcia Cobras	0	1	
Reus Imperials	0	1	
Barcelona Boxers	0	1	
Zaragoza Lions	0	1	

== LNFA Serie B ==
The Serie B is the second division of the LNFA. It was created in 2012 and named originally as LNFA while the top league was called LNFA Elite. In 2014, it changed the name to Serie B.

Year	Champion	Runner-up	Score
2012	Las Rozas Black Demons	Valencia Giants	14–10
2013	Granada Lions	Barberà Rookies	13–3
2014	Mallorca Voltors	Reus Imperials	9–7
2015	Reus Imperials	Barberà Rookies	24–20
2016	Murcia Cobras	L'Hospitalet Pioners	10–8
2017	Las Rozas Black Demons	L'Hospitalet Pioners	41–27
2018	Las Rozas Black Demons	L'Hospitalet Pioners	41–27
2021	L'Hospitalet Pioners	Barberà Rookies	24–21
2022	Alcobendas Cavaliers	Valencia Firebats	14–13
2023	Barcelona Pagesos	Terrassa Reds	10–7
2024	Terrassa Reds	Valencia Giants	30–16
2025	Valencia Firebats	Alcobendas Cavaliers	45–6
2026	Alcobendas Cavaliers	Alcorcón Smilodons	35–0

== LNFA Serie C ==
The Serie C is the third division of the LNFA. It was created in 2015 with the aim to get more teams in the national leagues.

Year	Champion	Runner-up	Score
2015	Gijón Mariners	Alicante Sharks	13–0
2016	Rivas Osos	Las Rozas Black Demons	18–0
2017	Camioneros de Coslada	Alicante Sharks	40–0
2018	Barcelona Uroloki	Guadalajara Stings	39–14

== See also ==
- Copa de España de Fútbol Americano
- LNFA 2
