= Reus Imperials =

Spanish American football team

General information
- Founded: 1989
- Headquartered: Reus
- Colors: green and white Green White

Personnel
- Head coach: Tim Bishop
- President: Jaume Agustench

League / conference affiliations
- LNFA; Serie A

The Reus Imperials is an American football team from Reus. They were founded in late 1989 by Josep Lluis Castán y Solanellas. He moved his residence from Barcelona to Reus, when he did this.

== History ==
The team was founded as The Terraco Imperials in the city of Tarragon by Josep Lluis Castán y Solanellas, a former player of the Spanish American football teams the Barcelona Howlers and the Barcelona Broncos.

The team gained a sponsor for the 1992-93 season which caused the team to change their team colors from red, yellow, and white to the current green, yellow, and white. During the following season the team absorbs another American football team: the Senglars de Reus. However they lose their sponsor and end up playing in a variety of stadiums throughout Province of Tarragona. The 1994-95 season marks the first time the team is headquartered and plays in Reus for the entirety of the season, which was facilitated by the city's Municipal Institute for Sports. From this point on, the team plays in the Catalan American Football League uninterrupted.

Ex-NFL player Mike Sullivan coached the team to back to back Catalan League championships in 1998 and 1999. Mike Sullivan steps down as head coach, and the team has limited success until the 2005-06 season when they win another Catalan League championship. The following decades has the Reus Imperials winning several Catalan League and LNFA Serie B championships.

At the start of the 2015-2016, the Reus Imperials moved from Serie B to Serie A. They were unable to compete in Serie A for the 2017-2018 season but returned to competing in that league for the 2018-2019 season.

== Honours ==
=== National ===
- Serie B Championships (4): 2008, 2009, 2010, 2015

=== Regional ===
- Catalan League (8): 1998, 1999, 2006, 2008, 2009, 2011, 2012, 2013
- Catalan Cup (2): 1998, 1999
