= Sueca Ricers =

American football team in Sueca, Spain

Helmet
Logo

General information
- Founded: 2007
- Stadium: Antonio Puchades Stadium
- Headquartered: Sueca Spain
- Colors: gold midnight blue

Personnel
- Head coach: Salvador Bartolomé
- President: Mariano Marqués

League / conference affiliations
- LNFA; South (Serie B)

Sueca Ricers is an American football team based in Sueca, Spain.
