= Sevilla Linces =

American football team based in Seville, Spain

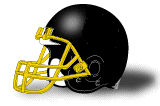
Helmet
Logo

General information
- Founded: 1992
- Stadium: I.D. La Cartuja
- Headquartered: Seville Spain
- Colors: Purple Yellow black

Personnel
- Head coach: Alfonso Chico (Germany)
- President: J.A. "Fali" Ascasibar (Spain)

League / conference affiliations
- LNFA

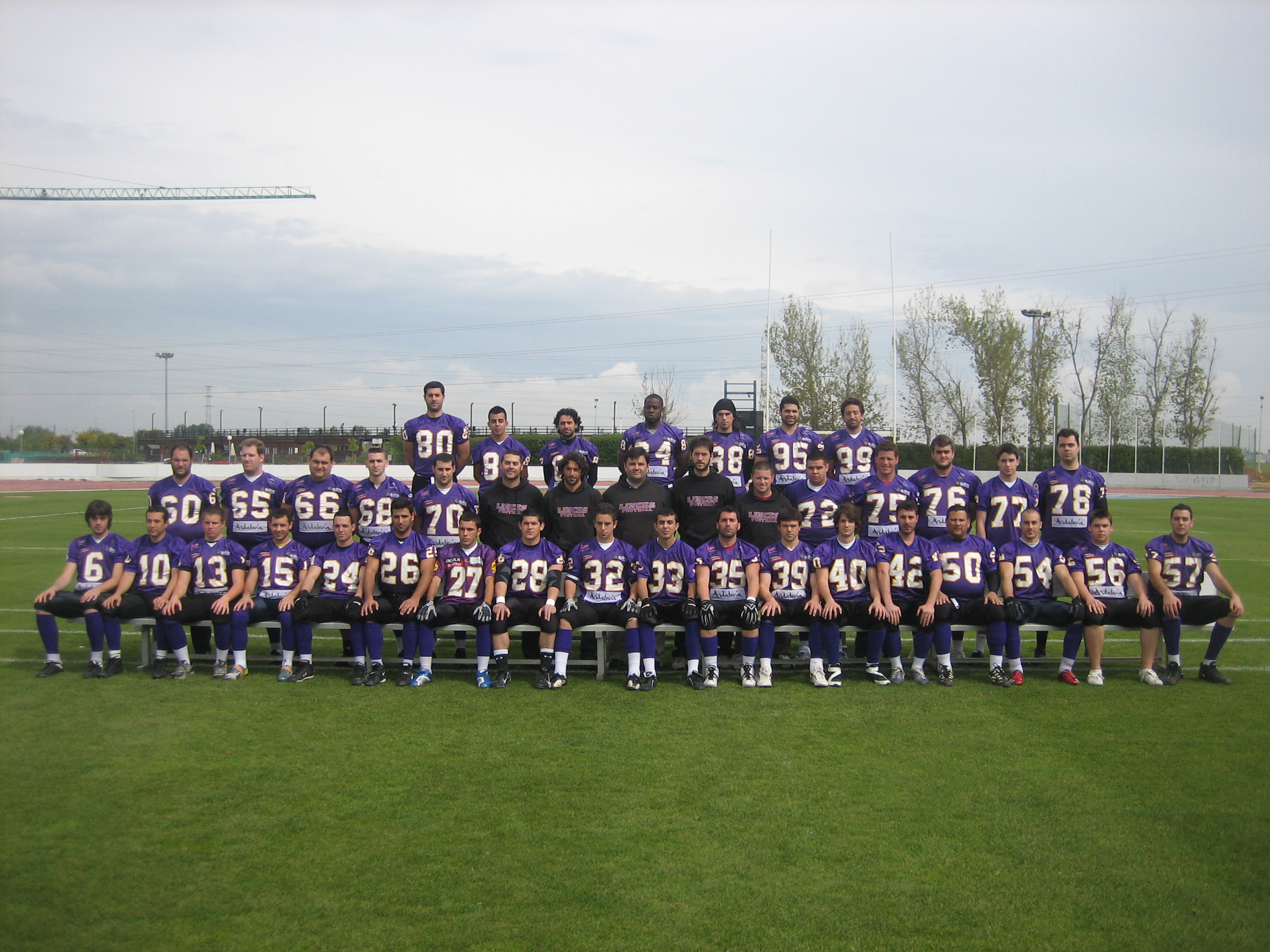
Sevilla Linces 2008/09.

Sevilla Linces (Seville Lynxes in English) is an American football team based in Seville, Andalusia (Spain).

== History ==
The team was founded by three fans (Antonio Cornejo Dueñas, Santiago Vega García and Basilio Parrado Parade) brought together by an advertisement published in a football magazine called 100 yards, asking for people to play football for fun. After playing at local parks, the decision was made to compete officially.

After a friendly game against Cádiz Corsarios played on 14 May 1993 - the first ever football game in Andalusia - the team joined the Spanish second division.

In 1999 the team were finally promoted to the elite league in Spain, the LNFA, where they have been competing since.

== Notable coaches ==
- (Italy) Alfonso Genchi (1993)
- (Spain) David González (2000)
- (Spain) J.A. "Fali" Ascasibar (2004)
- (Spain) Jose Luis Corrochano (2007)
- (Spain) Antonio Laguna (2009)
- (Mexico) Sergio Gonzalez (2010)
- (United States) Orlando Pantoja (2011)
- (Spain) Raúl Laguna (2012)
- (Spain) Antonio Garrido (2012)

== Notable players ==
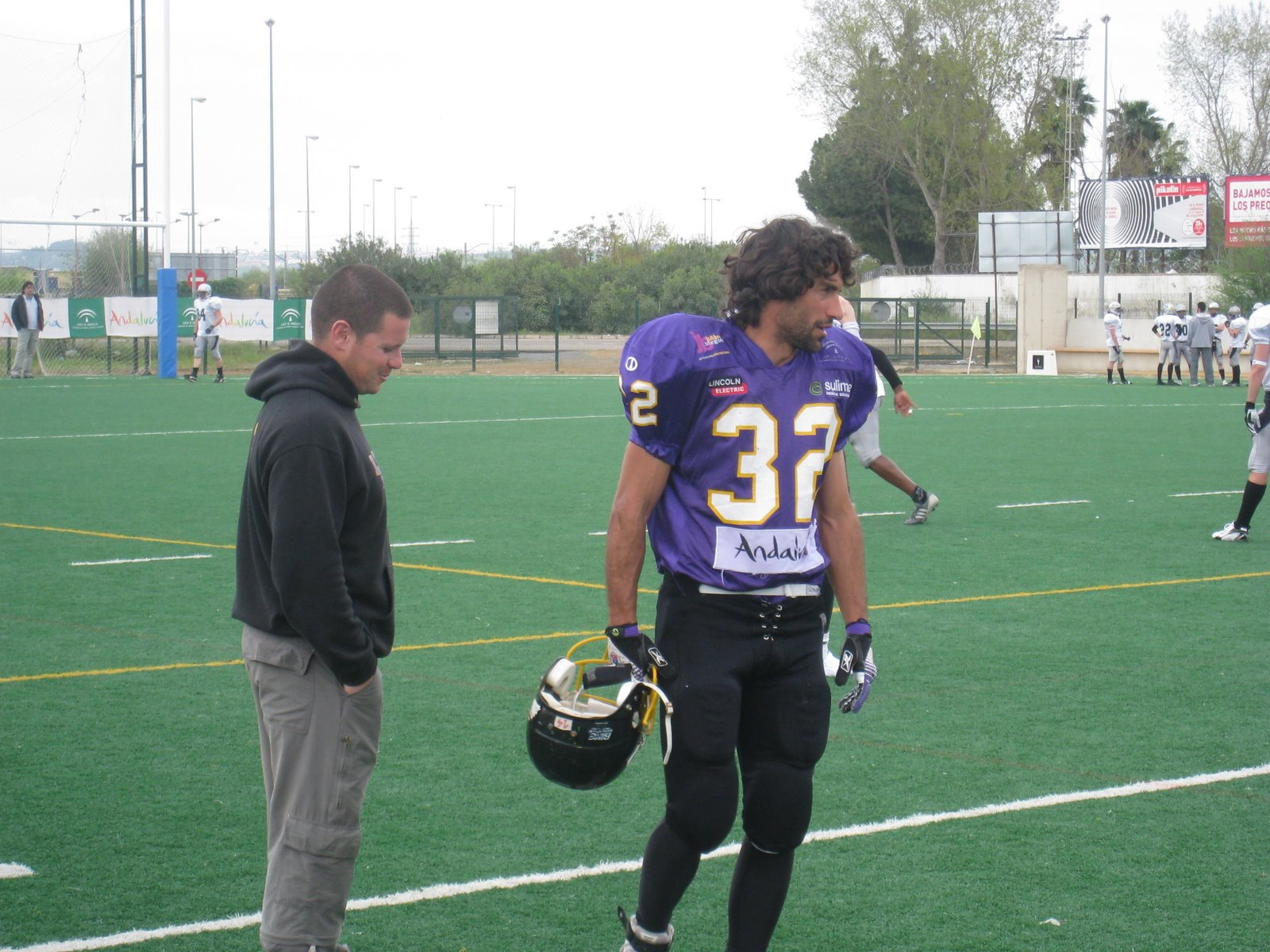
Antonio Laguna, Head Coach and Linebacker, and Diego Christe, strength coach

=== Spanish players ===
- Manuel Fernandez Gomez, All-Spain Team,(1994).
- Antonio Laguna, All-Spain Team, (2003).
- Sergio Forte, All-Spain Team(2003).
- Antonio Ferro, Junior All-Spain Team (2004).
- Alexis Harrelson, Junior All-Spain Team (2006).
- Antonio Coleman, Junior All-Spain Team (2008).
- Jairo Camacho, Junior All-Spain Team (2010).
- Juan Carlos Garcia, Junior All-Spain Team (2010).

=== International players ===
- (United States) Cameron Scripture, former Gustavus Adolphus Golden Gusties player (2000).
- (Mexico) Alejandro Garay, former ITESM CCM Borregos Salvajes player (2001).
- (Mexico) Gerardo Torrado, former UDLA Aztecas player (2001).
- (Mexico) Manuel Herrera, former UDLA Aztecas player (2001).
- (Mexico) Ezra Valencia, former UDLA Aztecas player (2002).
- (Mexico) Oscar Vaca, former CGP Centinelas player (2002).
- (United States) Sean Michael Moore, former Princeton Tigers player (2002).
- (United States) Andre Warner, former Hopkins School Hilltoppers player (2003).
- (Italy) Marco Mantovani, former Ferrara Aquile player (2003).
- (Italy) Michele Ventorre, former Ferrara Aquile player (2003).
- (Mexico) Jorge Sanchez, former UDLA Aztecas player (2005).
- (United States) Mark Pituch, former Grinnell Pioneers player (2005).
- (Italy) Matteo Bigliardi, former Bologna Warriors player (2005).
- (Italy) Paolo Arcilesi, former Palermo Corsari player (2005).
- (France) Thomas Griette, former La Courneuve Flash player (2005).
- (Mexico) Pablo Hernandez, former Naucalpan Perros Negros player (2006).
- (United States) Ryan Crawford, former Oakwood High School, Dayton Ohio player (2006).
- (United States) Edward Ramirez, former Valley Highschool, Las Vegas player (2007).
- (United States) Colten Crist, former Smithson Valley HS Rangers player (2008).
- (United States) Ryan Baxter, former Highland Park HS Scots player (2008).
- (United States) Alex Garfio, former UC Davis Aggies player (2009).
- (United States) Cameron Martin, former Millard North HS Mustangs player (2009).
- (Mexico) Sergio Gonzalez, former UDLA Aztecas player (2009)
- (United States) Ricky Koon, St. Louis (2010)
- (United States) Ulises (ElChingon) Rafael Escamilla Peña, former St. Joseph Academy Bloodhounds player (1994)
