= Barcelona Uroloki =

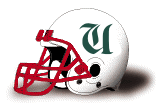
Helmet

General information
- Founded: 1990
- Headquartered: Barcelona
- Colors: Green White Red
- Mascot: dragon

Personnel
- Head coach: Aingeru Duarte
- President: Marcos Guirles

League / conference affiliations
- LNFA/LCFA

The Barcelona Uroloki are an American football team from Barcelona. Barcelona Uroloki have won LNFA Serie B (03,04,05) | LNFA Serie C (21) | LCFA Senior (00,02,03,04,05,19,21) | LCFA 9 Senior (05) | LCFA 7 Senior (02,03,04) | Supercopa Catalana (01)
