= Barberà Rookies =

American football team in Barberà del Vallès, Spain

Helmet
Logo

General information
- Founded: 2002
- Stadium: Poliesportiu Can Llobet
- Headquartered: Barberà del Vallès, Spain
- Colors: blue white Light blue

Personnel
- Head coach: (Spain) Roberto Torrecillas
- President: Carles Ortiz

League / conference affiliations
- LNFA; Serie A

Barberà Rookies is an American football team based in Barberà del Vallès, Spain.

== Honours ==
- Catalan League: (2): 2007, 2010
