= Granada Lions =

American football team based in Granada, Andalusia, Spain

Helmet
Logo

General information
- Founded: 2001
- Stadium: Complejo Deportivo Antonio Prieto Castillo
- Headquartered: Granada Spain
- Colors: Blue Orange

Personnel
- President: Javier Sánchez (Spain)

League / conference affiliations
- LNFA

Granada Lions is an American football team based in Granada, Andalusia, Spain.

== History ==
The team was established February 2, 2001 as Granada Universitarios. The name was later changed to the actual Lions, after one of the better known symbols from the Alhambra, the Court of the Lions, in order to represent the whole city of Granada.

After playing in regional leagues, they joined the national league LNFA 2 in 2004.

Finally, in 2006, the team was promoted to the top league in Spain, the LNFA, where they keep competing.

== Notable players ==
- (Spain) Alvaro Carvajal, Quarterback

== Notable former players ==
- (United States) Brian Wilbur, Quarterback
