= Murcia Cobras =

Spanish American football team

Helmet
Logo

General information
- Founded: 1994
- Headquartered: Murcia Spain
- Colors: Red Black White

League / conference affiliations
- LNFA

Murcia Cobras is an American football team based in Murcia, Region of Murcia, Spain.

== History ==
The team was officially established in 1994. They played regional competitions for two years before joining the first season of the new Spanish national league in 1997, being included in the Second Division of the competition.

Michael Bangel was signed as the first Pro American Import player and helped lead the organization to National Championships. The Cobras have since brought in many import players.

In 2016, Cobras became champion of the Serie B and promoted to the Serie A, the top Spanish league.
