= Badalona Dracs =

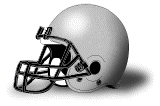
Helmet
Logo

General information
- Founded: 1987; 39 years ago
- Stadium: Estadi Municipal de Badalona (5000)
- Headquartered: Badalona, Catalonia
- Colors: Silver Black

Personnel
- Head coach: Genaro Alfonsín (Spain)

League / conference affiliations
- LNFA; Serie A

Championships
- LNFA titles: 11 (1998, 1999, 2002−2004, 2014, 2016−2019, 2021)
- Spain's Cup titles: 8 (1999, 2004, 2017–2021, 2026)

Current uniform
Home

Away

The Badalona Dracs (Catalan pronunciation: [bəðəˈlonə ˈðɾaks], "Badalona Dragons") are a gridiron football team based in Badalona, Catalonia.

== History ==
Three American football enthusiasts got together in Badalona on a December 1987's evening to found the team. They were Pere Moliner, first president of the team, Ramón Ventura and Italian Alfonso Genchi. The team was founded as Badalona Drags. Just a few months later, the team was established and the first ever American football game played in Spain was set for March 19, 1988. Badalona Dracs played Palermo Cardinals (Italy), with a score of 18–12 for the Italians. Later on, the first organized league in Spain was created with the Dracs joining three other teams, L'Hospitalet Pioners, Barcelona Búfals and the defunct Barcelona Boxers. Badalona Dracs won the competition. It was just the first of many championships.

In the year 2001 participated in a new tournament of football falg in Santurtzi(Biscay, Spain) the days 14 and 15 of july. They participated 14 teams. The locals were the basque team Coyotes Santurtzi.

After the 2004 season the team changed names to Badalona Dracs.

The Dracs won the last five Spanish titles from 2016 until 2021. With a total of eleven LNFA titles they have the best championship record in Spain. They have also won 7 Spain's Cup and participated in 2 finals of the EFAF Cup (2002 & 2014).

== Honours ==
=== National ===
- Spanish League (11): 1998, 1999, 2002, 2003, 2004, 2014, 2016, 2017, 2018, 2019, 2021
- Spanish Cup (8): 1999, 2004, 2017, 2018, 2019, 2020, 2021, 2026

=== International ===
- EFAF Cup runner up (1): 2002
- European Football League runner up (1): 2014

=== Regional ===
- Catalan League (1): 1988
- Catalan Cup (14): 2003, 2010, 2011, 2012, 2013, 2014, 2015, 2016, 2017, 2020, 2021, 2022, 2023, 2024
