= Valencia Giants =

American-football team

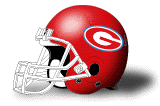
Helmet
Logo

General information
- Founded: 2003; 23 years ago
- Stadium: Estadi Jardins del Túria; Polideportivo Municipal El Saler
- Headquartered: Valencia, Spain
- Colors: Lust Dark blue

Personnel
- Head coach: Gustavo Tella

League / conference affiliations
- LNFA; Serie A

The Valencia Giants are an American football team based in Valencia, Spain.

The Giants compete in LNFA Serie A, the top division of American football in Spain.
