= Valencia Firebats =

American football team in Spain

Helmet
Logo

General information
- Founded: 1993; 33 years ago
- Stadium: Estadio Municipal Jardín del Turia
- Headquartered: Valencia Spain
- Colors: Yellow black White

Personnel
- Head coach: (United States) Stuart Franklin
- President: (Spain) José Miguel Alonso

League / conference affiliations
- LNFA; LNFA Serie B

Championships
- LNFA titles: 4 (2006, 2007, 2009, 2015)

Current uniform
Home

Away

The Valencia Firebats are a gridiron team based in Valencia, Valencian Community (Spain).

== History ==
The team was established in April, 1993, as Valencia Bats, joining the defunct American Football League (AFL) for the 1994 season. The following season a new national league is created in Spain, divided in two divisions, First and Second. Valencia Bats are invited to compete in the First Division, where they have been playing ever since.

In the 2002 season, the team makes his first appearance in the EFAF Cup, in the same group with Badalona Dracs (Spain) and Ostia Marines (Italy).

2006 was a remarkable season, as the team won their first national bowl, beating L'Hospitalet Pioners and qualifying for the first time for the European Football League, where they met Bergamo Lions (Italy) and Tirol Raiders (Austria) in the 2007 season.

They won the Spanish bowl again on the next season, 2007, against Badalona Dracs this time. Once again, they qualified as national champions for the European Football League. This time, rivals were Coventry Jets (UK) and Oslo Vikings (Norway).

In the 2008 season, for third time in a row, they played the |Spanish bowl, being defeated by L'Hospitalet Pioners, but qualifying for their third European Football League, where they faced the Bolzano Giants (Italy) and the Braunschweig Lions (Germany) in 2009.

In 2009 they faced their 4th Spanish bowl, beating the Badalona Dracs in a tough game and clinched a berth again for the EFL in 2010, where they met Bergamo Lions (Italy) and the Elancourt Templiers (France) in their group, which they won. In the Quarterfinals they lost 55–13 against the title holder Swarco Raiders Tirol.

From 2014 to 2016 they made the national final three times in a row winning the title in 2015.

== Honours ==
- Spanish League (4): 2006, 2007, 2009, 2015
