= Barcelona Búfals =

Helmet
Logo

General information
- Founded: 1987
- Stadium: Estadi Olímpic Lluís Companys
- Headquartered: Barcelona, Catalonia, Spain
- Colors: Blue Navy White
- Mascot: Bufalito

Personnel
- Head coach: Manuel de la Fuente
- President: Vito Rodríguez

League / conference affiliations
- LNFA; East (Serie B)

Current uniform
Home

Away

Barcelona Búfals is an American football team based in Barcelona, Catalonia, Spain. Búfals was founded on 1988 and were one of the four teams to play the first league competition in Spain.

The team compete in LNFA Serie B, the second-tier division of American football in Spain.
