= L'Hospitalet Pioners =

Helmet
Logo

General information
- Founded: 1988; 38 years ago
- Stadium: Complex Esportiu Hospitalet Nord
- Headquartered: L'Hospitalet de Llobregat Spain
- Colors: Red White black

Personnel
- Head coach: Bart Iaccarino (United States)
- President: David Castillo (France)

League / conference affiliations
- LNFA; LNFA Serie B

Championships
- LNFA titles: 6 (2005, 2008, 2010, 2011, 2012, 2013)
- Spain's Cup titles: 9 (2000, 2005, 2006, 2008, 2010, 2011, 2012, 2013, 2014)

The L'Hospitalet Pioners (Catalan pronunciation: [luspitəˈlɛt pi.uˈnes]; "L'Hospitalet Pioneers") are a gridiron football team based in L'Hospitalet de Llobregat, Catalonia (Spain).

== History ==
Their nickname recalls the history of the team, as they are one of the pioneering teams to play gridiron in Spain, together with Badalona Drags, Poblenou Búfals and Barcelona Boxers (defunct). The four teams played in 1988 the first Spanish championship.

== Titles ==
- Spanish League (6): 2005, 2008, 2010, 2011, 2012, 2013.
- Spanish Cup (9): 2000, 2005, 2006, 2008, 2010, 2011, 2012, 2013, 2014.
