= Rivas Osos =

Helmet
Logo

General information
- Founded: 1989; 37 years ago
- Stadium: Estadio Cerro del Telégrafo
- Headquartered: Rivas-Vaciamadrid Spain
- Colors: Yellow Red White

Personnel
- Head coach: Enrique Fernandez Gomez (Spain)

League / conference affiliations
- LNFA; LNFA Elite

Championships
- LNFA titles: 2 (2001, 2022)
- Spain's Cup titles: 5 (2001, 2002, 2003, 2007 & 2009)

Rivas Osos (Rivas Bears in English language) is an American football team based in Rivas-Vaciamadrid, Community of Madrid (Spain).

They have won the LNFA twice, in 2001 and 2022, and were runners-up in 1999, 2002, 2012 and 2023. They have also conquered the Spanish Cup in 2001, 2002, 2003, 2007 and 2009.

== History ==
=== The beginnings ===
The team was established in the spring of 1989 as Madrid Bears, changing names to Madrid Osos when they joined their first official competition by the end of that year, the Second Catalan Football League. During those first years, the team received a lot of help (equipment, players, coaching staff, etc.) from the American soldiers stationed at the nearby base of Torrejón.

The team played their first game in the Community of Madrid before 500 spectators in a friendly match against the Barcelona Búfals in July 1989, which despite ending in a 14–6 defeat left a good impression and was vital to the development of new teams such as Madrid Panthers, Toros de Madrid (Madrid Bulls) and Delfines de Madrid (Madrid Dolphins).

The Bears' first participation in official competition implied searching for a sponsor, to reduce the cost of equipment. American football in Spain was practiced only in the area of Catalonia, so the Bears entered the II Catalan Football League. Their first game in the league was against the incumbent league champions, Badalona Dracs. The Dracs were defeated by the Bears who only had played one game before then.

Madrid Osos reached the semifinals undefeated that year, being defeated then by the Dracs. The Osos participation in this competition ended in fourth position.

The II Football Supercopa of Spain was a progression in the sport for the Osos, as the team reached the Cup final against the mighty Barcelona Boxers in a great match in the Olympic Stadium in Barcelona, in which the Boxers won before 25,000 spectators. The Madrid Bears lost, and remained runners-up.

=== The 1990s ===
- 1991. There is a split into two leagues, the League remains Catalana (FCFA), and creating a new business called Spain League Football League in which teams from all over Spain and which is transmitted by television. The league did not have much commercial success due to lack of sport for the audience. As far as sport was a success for the Bears, being a semifinalist in the two years.
- 1993. Change the organization of the league to become organized by themselves Clubs (AFL); Bears again be a semifinalist.
- 1994. AFL leagues and CFA are united in AEFA and creating the first National Football League unified with 20 teams in the competition. Start a generational change in Bears coinciding with the height of other teams, which makes the writing a few years without notable rankings: 7th, 9th, 7th and 8th but always stays in first division.
- 1999. Bears Madrid proves again that is in the elite American football in Spain, getting a staff to be finalists national league, winning all matches played under the final. Never in the history of any equipment LNFA had made it to the Final without foreign players. The second offers the possibility to play Bears for the first time the European Football League, being eliminated in the first round for the Argonauts. The next season will again be at a good level, but have to settle for being a semifinalist in LNFA.

=== From 2000 ===
- 2000. The team moved its headquarters to the town of Rivas, a town of 25,000 inhabitants, situated 15 km from Madrid, with the intention of developing a major football program in a town with very young population and devoted to the sport as a basis for youth development Rivas. Schools are created Bears in a new phase.
- 2001. Tis the season for the confirmation of a job well done with the base, and making up the National League Championship and Cup of Spain without foreign signings. In addition to the championship of Spain Flag (Football contactless) played in Santurce. The League victory entitles the Bears team to the second participation in the European Football League.
- 2002. Season of permanent settlement, is still with the same coach and are incorporated reinforcements in the face of European competition, and consolidation in the league and Cup This is achieved for the second consecutive Cup in Spain against Dracs. In League things are going very well and gets to close the regular season without losing a game and plants on the way back against Dracs. Too bad for failures and nervousness in the Finals, it was lost, until the last minute can choose the title. With regard to Europe had to face Lions Bergamo, Italy penta champion and Champion of Europe in the last two editions, which would also have to add this year. In the game of Rivas, with a packed stadium (about 1,000 spectators), the Italians were placed in a tough game in which the Bears gave no time lost the match and fought until the end. The result was 7–35. In the second leg more affected by rain Bears team that could not deploy their passing game thereby weakening the chances of at least stand up more plausible. The final result was 55–0.
- 2003. It started with the aim of revalidation for the third consecutive Cup title, a goal that was achieved by defeating the team from Badalona again in the final. It pulled the European Cup competition, which the team gave up by not having a budget capable of making us competitive in continental competition. And in the National League was able to access the semifinals again.
- 2004. The season was raised in the same way as above, but with the hope of being the only team to win four Cups in Spain in a row. But our hopes hit the wall after losing in the final against Badalona Dracs, who took their revenge after three years of victories for Bears. In the domestic competition and the absence of foreign contract achieved a pass to the semifinals. The joys of the season came for the procurement of R Madrid Liga and the Championship U16 flag that took the kids in Rivas and thus to represent the first tournament in Madrid in the autonomous community of Flag Football.
- 2005. It was a transition year as sports and institutionally: there was a change in the policy team, signed a new agreement with the city and wanted to further boost the ranks. In the sporting arena reached the semifinals in the crown of Spain and got a very creditable fourth place in the league, a position not expected from the start to the season as the limited budget and low key players were an added disadvantage the competition. Opened at lower levels than the U-18 with two official parties and the future of the team put in Rivas players as the team comprises 14 players of this our town. And the Under-16 team for the second year remained champions of Flag Madrid which led them to represent Madrid in the Spanish Flag Bowl Championship U-16, achieving the fifth place.
- 2006. Season settlement of the new sports policy and consolidation, has again demonstrated that it is one of the teams, players, Spain's strongest, managing to reach the final of the Cup of Spain and has successfully completed the regular phase in first position, but falling in the semifinals defeated the classification in the season falls to third in the league. In lower categories U-18 team has participated in the first National Junior League getting the Eighth, is a very young team that needs more running but still the team's future. And the Under-16 team for the third year has become League Champion Flag Madrileña which led them again to represent Madrid in the Spanish Flag Bowl Championship U-16 where they managed to finish third.
- 2007. Madrid Osos again won the Cup in Spain against Pioners L'Hospitalet in Rivas (20–3), in the semifinals defeating Valencia Firebats League champion 2006 and 2007 - after a tight match (7–6) .
- 2008. Repeated Osos Cup final against Spain L'Hospitalet Pioners; this time winning the Catalan side. In its participation in the XIII edition of the Bears LNFA demonstrated excellent offensive game, finishing as the second highest-scoring team in the league. Rivas's squad was led by Scott Mackey, quarterback from Wayne State University, due to the injury suffered by the historic Bears quarterback, Toni Velasco. The team concluded the regular season as the third place with a record of 6–2, losing in the semifinals in Valencia against Firebats ADT. It was also remarkable, after several years of work at lower levels, incorporating the first player the team coming from the quarry in recent years.
- 2009–2010. In the last two years Osos reached the semifinals of the National League left in fourth place in the competición. The team is in a process of generational replacement that makes the average age of the team is very young. This coupled with the excellent preparation of the players that have formed in different categories of the club, through Flagfootball, cadet, junior and team B has the potential of the immediate future is very good opting to major sporting successes.
- 2010–2011. In this season Osos build a great team achievement among national players and transfers. Players such as Georgia Tech center Sean Bedford, the offensive tackle Rune Jensen from Denmark, the offensive tackle Matt Luck of England and American quarterback Scott Mackey completed a large roster that played good football despite being unable to reach semifinals competition. But the leap was great and the experience of our young players can face us with optimism for next season. The team may choose to what is proposed.
- 2011–2012. In this season Osos continue building a great team. Players such as Cal Poly quarterback Tony Smith, the offensive tackle Marcos Carmona from ONEFA and the center Steve Jordan of Towson University and American completed a large roster that played good football and played the final of Nacional Football League, first time after 10 years. The team continued work too in junior teams and the future is very good for the next seasons.

=== Staff ===
- Edouard Barrera - Athletic Director
- Sebastian Serrano - Head Coach - Defensive Coordinator
- Ignacio Pliego - Offensive Coordinator
- Javier Hernandez - Assistant Offensive Coordinator
- Fernando Guijarro - Offensive & Defensive Line Coach
- Luis Javier Boza - Special Teams Coordinator
