= Las Rozas Black Demons =

American football team in Spain

Helmet
Logo

General information
- Founded: 2000
- Stadium: El Cantizal
- Headquartered: Las Rozas de Madrid, Spain
- Colors: Black White

Personnel
- Head coach: Bryan Inglis
- President: Darío Hernández

League / conference affiliations
- LNFA; Serie A

Championships
- LNFA titles: 4 (2023, 2024, 2025, 206)

Las Rozas Black Demons is an American football team based in Las Rozas, Spain.

The team compete in LNFA Serie A, the first-tier division of American football in Spain.
