= Camas =

Camas may refer to:

== Plants and ecosystems ==
- Camassia, a plant genus native to North America, particularly:
  - Camassia quamash, also called kwetlal, native to southern Canada and the northwestern United States
- Camas prairie, several areas in the western United States

== Places ==
- Camas, Seville, Spain
- Camas, Idaho, United States
- Camas, Montana, United States
- Camas, Washington, United States
- Camas County, Idaho, United States
- Camas Tuath, a bay on the Isle of Mull, UK
- Camas Hot Springs

== Other ==
- Camas Bookstore and Infoshop in British Columbia, Canada.
- Camas (magazine), a literary periodical

== See also ==
- Deathcamas (disambiguation)
