= Jaykub Allen Hurley =

American author

Jaykub Allen Hurley (June 24, 1983 – May 28, 2008) was an American author of short fiction. Hurley was a native of Oakland, California and published stories in Southern Review and Mid-American Review. He died in an accidental hit and run while walking alone on a country road in Missoula, Montana on May 28, 2008.

== Biography ==
Jaykub Allen Hurley was born in Oakland, California, the youngest of four children of Goeffrey Allen Hurley and Wilhelmina Thomson. Hurley was raised in the 85th Avenue of the Brookfield District in what is known as Deep East Oakland, an area known for having the highest rates of criminal and drug activity in the entire Bay Area. Hurley's father made a living, as a bartender while also aspiring to be a jazz musician while his mother was a secretary before an injury forced her early retirement.

Hurley graduated from Oakland High School's Visual Arts Academy in 2002. He briefly attended New York University's Steinhart Department of Art and Art Development. As a sophomore Hurley studied human development in art before transferring to Merritt College where he instead completed a bachelor's degree in education in 2006. After graduating from Merrit College he began working for the Oakland Unified School District teaching English. As a graduate student, Hurley studied at The University of Montana's creative writing program under Judy Blunt, Peter Orner, Kevin Canty, and Pregeeta Sharma. Shortly before his death, Hurley attended VONA: The Voices Summer Writing Workshop for Writers of Color in San Francisco. He studied under ZZ Packer.

While at The University of Montana, Hurley deliberately styled himself as an "artist who writes," and his reticent sensibility often caused him to distance himself from the rest of the writers. Hurley was a devote fan of jazz music but also a fan of the hip-hop music of A Tribe Called Quest and the music of Nina Simone who he often referred to as his "musical muse".

Hurley died in a hit a run in Missoula, Montana. His death caused a controversy as officials originally labeled his death as a suicide although the Missoula Police Department had substantial evidence leading to a hit and run crash. Although, it was a hit and run accident, many of his friends and acquaintances acknowledge Hurley's penchant for walking alone on dark country roads as he felt his ideas "flowed better while floating in the darkness and blanketed by a starry sky." Hurley was buried in Oakland, California.

== Writing ==
Hurley published two short stories in his lifetime. His first story, "Striver's Row" and "Loop-Jammed L" were published Southern Review. While his controversial essay, "Red Nigger Moon" was forthcoming in Mid-American Review shortly before his death. These and a collection of other unpublished short stories; essays, sketches and other works were collected in an anthology called November Cotton Flower and will be published from Hanging Loose. The short story, "Striver's Row" was included in Best American Voices 2008 while his essay, "Red Nigger Moon" was anthologized in Best American Essays 2008, the first time a writer has ever published simultaneous work in different genres in the Best American series.

Hurley's self-proclaimed "wax jazz" aesthetic is characterized by his vivid agile lyricism and unusual syntax composition in his fiction. Most of Hurley's fiction deals with African-American's characters and naturalistic settings that explore "the relationships between men, women, families, and music in fantastical expressionistic gestures." Hurley's essays have often been compared to Joan Didion's "clinical exploration while having still unveiling shades of Wright and Baldwin."

== Quotes ==
- "My work aims for some kind of verbal minstrelsy. My stories seem themed, they're wax jazz, with a sense that the wax has melted and is seeping."
- "I'm not a writer. I'm first an artist who so happens to write. I paint and construct art through bending language."
- "Making statement in my fiction through my characters, their interactions and the usage of form are more important for me than crafting a perfect linear story that makes a reader comfortable. My form aims to skew the dynamics of the situation."
- "Nina Simone lives in my world, her voice breathes in my writing. She is my musical muse."

== Awards and honors ==
- Pushcart Prize, Fiction 2008 (posthumous)
- Pushcart Prize, Essay 2008 (posthumous)
- Silverfish Award for Fiction Writing, Oakland, California 2007
- George G. Plimpton Fellowship, The University of Montana, Missoula 2007
