= Monte Dolack =

American artist

- Born: May 23, 1950 (age 76); Great Falls, Montana, U.S.
- Education: University of Montana
- Known for: Painting, poster art, watercolor
- Notable work: "Blackfoot River"; "Going To The Sun"; "Returning the Wolf to Yellowstone" "Big Medicine" "Montana History Lesson"; the Invader Series
- Movement: Western American Art

Monte A. Dolack (born May 23, 1950) is an American graphic artist who lives in Missoula, Montana. Frommer's called him "one of the best-known artists in Montana." He works primarily in watercolor, acrylic paint, poster art, and lithographs. Dolack's work often features whimsical animals in both a natural and artificial setting (such as a suburban living room), and has a worldwide following. Dolack is considered a key figure in the visual arts of the American West.

Widely known in his home state of Montana, Dolack has had his work exhibited worldwide.

== Life and career ==
Dolack was born in May 1950 to Michael George and Mary (Miller) D. Dolack. His father had two sons from a previous marriage (Bob and Bill), while Mary gave birth to Monte and his sister, Marlene. He graduated from Great Falls High School in 1968. In his senior year, Dolack was chosen to design the cover of the GFHS yearbook, The Roundup. His design was a then-fashionable contemporary art work (similar to a Jackson Pollock image) which a teacher in 2006 later described as "flat-out ugly".

He attended Montana State University in Bozeman from 1969 to 1970 and the University of Montana in Missoula from 1970 to 1974, graduating with a bachelor's degree from the latter institution. While an undergraduate (in the days before Microsoft PowerPoint), Dolack often drew charts and graphs for the University of Montana Bureau of Business and Economic Research, which turned his work into photographic slides. Dolack married Linda LaFond in 1970, but they divorced in 1972. After graduation, Dolack was employed by the Anaconda Copper Company and was a member of "Out of Sight" (a rock band).

He is generally considered to have begun his professional artistic career in 1974. Dolack gained local notice for designing posters for the Crystal Theater, an art film theater in Missoula. By 1997, original Crystal Theater posters were collector's items. Dolack also created posters which he sold as artwork. Among his most important early works is "Yahoo," which depicts a cowgirl on a horse and an anti-nuclear power symbol at the bottom. Dolack created the poster to commemorate the day the Missoula City Council voted to ban nuclear facilities within the city limits. Beginning in 1978, Dolack had a studio located at 132 W. Front Street in Missoula. A 48-page color collection of his poster art, Catalog of Posters & Prints: Crystal Theatre, was published in 1982.

Dolack married artist Mary Beth Percival on May 11, 1984. The same year, he began a series of works known as the "Invader series." The works feature animals "invading" human habitat, such as ducks swimming in a bathtub or a bear lying on the couch in a den in a house. The following year, Dolack—who was already "a nationally known poster artist"—produced the cover of the book, Wings to the Orient: Pan American Clipper Planes, 1935–1945: A Pictorial History. Dolack's father, Michael, died the same year.

In 1989, Dolack's painting "Fast Forward" was featured in the show "Looking Forward" that exhibited emerging important artists, sponsored by the American Institute of Graphic Artists in Los Angeles. In 1990, Dolack donated a watercolor ("Restoring the Wolf to Yellowstone") depicting wolves looking over a plain of geysers and hot mud springs to the conservation group Defenders of Wildlife, with sales of the poster going to a fund to compensate local ranchers for the loss of livestock incurred due to the reintroduction of grey wolves into Yellowstone National Park. Although the fund also received donations from other foundations and proceeds from a benefit concert by rock artist James Taylor, the majority of the fund's proceeds came from sales of Dolack's art. The National Park Service in April 1990 banned the sale of the posters in Yellowstone and Glacier National Park.

By 1993, his work had been shown in "hundreds of galleries, including some in Japan, Germany and France". That same year, he moved to a new, larger gallery at 139 W. Front Street. In 1998, Dolack donated his popular 1986 watercolor, "Blackfoot River," to the Blackfoot Legacy foundation for use as a fundraiser to oppose construction of a gold mine near Lincoln, Montana. The following year, the Idaho Rivers United foundation commissioned Dolack to create a new work (later titled "Resurrection") depicting a breached dam and the reintroduction of salmon and steelhead trout to the Snake River. The California clothing company Patagonia sold copies of the print through its stores and catalogs.

The next year, Dolack's "Heron Blues" (a poster primarily in blue hues depicting a blue heron flying down a Montana city street at night) was included in the poetic collection Vagrant Grace. In 2000, Dolack painted a 2-by-3-foot (0.61 by 0.91 m) acrylic work, "A History Lesson," which depicted a full-grown American bison standing in a schoolroom which is decorated with pictures, symbols, blackboard writing, and other images important to Montana history. The work hung in the C.M. Russell Museum, one of the nation's premier Western art museums, before being donated to Great Falls High School. That same year, his painting "Streamside," was featured on the cover of the academic work The Evolutionary Imagination in Late-Victorian Novels: An Entangled Bank. The same year, Farcountry Press published a retrospective book, Monte Dolack, The Works, featuring his work.

In December 2001, Dolack created a new work, the 23-by-34-inch (58 by 86 cm) "Lewis and Clark and the Corps of Discovery at the White Cliffs of the Missouri," and donated it to the Lewis and Clark Interpretive Center near Black Eagle Dam on the Great Falls of the Missouri River. Posters of the work were used to raise money for the center, but it was sold for an undisclosed sum to First Interstate BancSystem three months later. Dolack's mother, Mary, died in 2002.

In 2003, the University of Montana's Montana World Trade Center arranged for several exhibits of Dolack's work in Ireland as part of a trade mission. The showings were so popular and gained such notice in the worldwide art community that showing of Dolack's work in New Zealand were also arranged in 2004.

Dolack was given a second chance to design his high school's yearbook in 2006. For the yearbook's 100th edition, Dolack contributed his recently completed "Montana Power"—which depicts a bison in a field of dry grass, with Square Butte in the background. That same year, Dolack's "Mirage" (a painting of rainbow trout leaping through a field of wheat as if it were water) appeared on the cover of the book Cowboy Trout: Western Fly Fishing As If It Matters. Two years later, Dolack's 2000 work, "A History Lesson" (now retitled "Montana History Lesson") was used on the front cover of the history book Montana: Stories of the Land, published by the Montana Historical Society.

On April 6, 2009, Dolack suffered a serious heart attack. Taken to St. Patrick Hospital and Health Sciences Center, Dolack underwent open-heart surgery, and a stent implanted in an artery to improve blood supply to his heart. The next year, Dolack's "Upper Missouri River Suite," which consists of three hand-drawn lithographs, was added to the art collection hanging at the new Missouri River Federal Courthouse in Great Falls.

In 2011, in celebration of the International Year of Forests, the United Nations Economic Commission for Europe and Food and Agriculture Organization of the United Nations planted 70 living trees in the Palais des Nations building in Geneva, Switzerland. In front of the temporary forest, the two organizations exhibited a large number of Dolack works which featured forests. The exhibition, "The Art of Trees—A Forest Gallery", also includes displays of innovative wood products and artwork made of wood.

== Style ==
It is not clear which artists have influenced Dolack's work. When he was a teenager, he says, he drew heavily on the work of Jackson Pollock. In 2002, Dolack said he had recently become intrigued by the work of Akseli Gallen-Kallela, a Finnish painter in the Neo-romantic style.

Dolack says he has a large library of artistic reference works which he uses to improve his technique and to gain inspiration. he also has a large number of anatomical, wildlife, landscape, and other reference works which he relies on to bring realism and strong detail to his work. But print works are not the only source of inspiration for him. He once gained an idea for a woodpecker carrying a burning branch ("Stealing Fire") by seeing a rebroadcast of The Power of Myth, a television documentary featuring conversations between mythologist Joseph Campbell and journalist Bill Moyers.

Dolack says his working style is to get an idea which he immediately sketches out on a small piece of paper. He then pins these sketches to a "Wall of Ideas" in his studio, and returns to them later Beginning work on a piece, he conducts research in his library to help make the work more realistic and detailed. His creative technique, however, involves what Dolack calls "working from the inside." As he told the Missoula Independent in 2002: "...I also want to bring in things that are from the inside and not the outside, and find the right place to mix the two of them together. Part of the road I'm on with these pictures is to graduate slowly toward being able to paint more from the inside."

Most of Dolack's post-Crystal Theater work features whimsical animals. While some of his art depicts straightforward scenes from nature, much of it is whimsical in nature. In commemorating a forest fire, one work depicts elk with their antlers on fire. To bring out the way in which fisherman "romance" fish from the water, another work depicts a man dancing with a gigantic rainbow trout. Whimsy is an important characteristic of Dolack's work. Filmmaker Annick Smith has described Dolack's work as "a fairytale version of [an] actual place. His whimsical eye informs both our urban and rural stories, adding color, form and sharp lines to the obscure and chaotic vistas of real life. He's a myth-maker, which is why he is Montana's most popular contemporary artist." Juxtaposition and paradox (a blue heron in an urban setting, fish leaping through a field of wheat) are two of the most common ways in which Dolack creates whimsy in his work. Smith, however, notes that Dolack's work, while representational, incorporates elements of psychedelic art, modern art, and postmodern art. His work also tends to be narrative, in that each image tells a story. Dolack has said his commissioned work tends to be more obvious in this regard, while his personal artwork is meant to be subtle—enjoyable if a viewer understands its philosophical underpinnings, and enjoyable if the viewer does not. As Dolack said of a series of works in 2002: "I didn't want these pictures to be didactic and finger-wagging kinds of pictures. You can get into that making posters, because you're really trying to tell people things, explain things or get a message across. With these pictures, I really wanted there to be a more poetic presence to them, where everyone could find their own message in the picture and have a different interpretation. So I didn't want to get too into explaining each picture."

Environmentalism is another key theme in Dolack's work. Dorothy Hinshaw Patent, former director of the Montana Committee for the Humanities, says that Dolack's environmental message in the mid 1980s was subtle. But by the time of his 2000 work "Montana History Lesson," she notes, Dolack had opted for "overt" statements.

The whimsical nature of Dolack's work masks exceptional technique as an artist, however. Maggie Mudd, executive director of the University of Montana's Montana Museum of Art and Culture, points out that Dolack uses "painstaking painting techniques" which produce highly polished visual surfaces. Dolack's work also exhibits "wildly inventive color".

=== Notable works ===
Among his more notable works are:

- "Yahoo" (1978) – One of his earliest works, the poster features a cowgirl on a horse, with an anti-nuclear symbol below.
- "Blackfoot River" (1986) – A 34-by-24-inch (86 by 61 cm) poster featuring a westslope cutthroat trout in the foreground, cliff face to the right, copse of trees to the left, and birds winging overhead.
- "Going To The Sun" (1987) – A 19-by-34-inch (48 by 86 cm) poster depicting a cyclist beginning to climb the Going-to-the-Sun Road in Glacier National Park.
- "Returning the Wolf to Yellowstone" (1990) – A 20-by-28-inch (51 by 71 cm) poster depicting wolves looking over a plain of geysers and hot mud springs in Yellowstone National park.
- "Ascension" (1992) – A bull trout attempts to climb a waterfalls.
- "Big Medicine" (1997) – A 25.75-by-19-inch (65.4 by 48.3 cm) giclee poster with hand coloring, the image depicts the famous albino bison Big Medicine, who was born in Montana in 1933.
- "Montana History Lesson" (also known as "A History Lesson") (2000) – A 2-by-3-foot (0.61 by 0.91 m) acrylic work depicting a full-grown bison standing in a schoolroom decorated with pictures, blackboard writing, and other images important to Montana history.

The Invader Series (begun in 1984) contains some of his best known works.

- "Suburban Refuge" (1984) – A 22-by-26-inch (56 by 66 cm) poster depicting ducks and other birds having taken over a bathroom (swimming in the tub, standing on the toilet, shredding the bathroom tissue).
- "Kitchen Preserve" (1985) – A 22-by-29-inch (56 by 74 cm) poster depicting birds having taken over a kitchen.
- "Refridgeraiders" (1986) – A 30-by-22-inch (76 by 56 cm) poster depicting penguins of different species raiding a home's refrigerator for food and ice.
- "After Hours" (1987) – A 22-by-30-inch (56 by 76 cm) poster depicting fish swimming into a home's living room through an open window.
- "Tie One On" (1989) – A 24-by-32-inch (61 by 81 cm) poster depicting birds of different species having opened a man's dresser in a home, and strewn his ties about.
- "Big Fish, Small Pond" (1991) – A 28.5-by-23.5-inch (72 by 60 cm) poster depicting fish leaping in a bathtub, while ducks stand nearby on the floor and tub rim.
- "Leave it to Beavers" (1992) – A 24.5-by-24.75-inch (62.2 by 62.9 cm) pastel painting of five beavers dismantling a living room in a log cabin.
- "Home on the Reef" (1994) – A 22-by-32-inch (56 by 81 cm) poster depicting tropical fish swimming about in the air in a suburban home's living room.
- "A Beauty" (1994) – A 14-by-10-inch (36 by 25 cm) half-size limited edition print depicting a large fish lying on a couch. Overhead, various paintings depict beautiful women lounging on couches and sofas as well
- "Bear's Den" (1995) – A 30-by-25-inch (76 by 64 cm) poster of a mother bear lying on a couch in a fisherman's cabin (having eaten the fisherman), while her two cubs explore the cabin.
- "Cabin Fever" (1997) – A 21-by-31-inch (53 by 79 cm) poster depicting fish swimming into a fisherman's cabin through an open window.
- "Harvest Time" (2000) – A 24-by-32-inch (61 by 81 cm) poster depicting pheasants, quail, ducks, and other birds feasting on a basket of bread left in an open window.

== Awards and honors ==
Dolack's work won "Best of Show" from the Los Angeles Society of Illustrators in 1991. The Missoulian in 1999 named Dolack "100 Montanans of the 20th Century." In 2003, Trout Unlimited bestowed its Communications for Coldwater Conservation Award—an annual honor given to a reporter, writer, or artist whose work has made significant gains in educating the public about conservation and the habitat of coldwater fish—on Dolack.

The Monte Dolack Scholarship Fund at Great Falls High School is named for him.

The westslope cutthroat trout from Dolack's 1986 "Blackfoot River" is featured on a Trout Unlimited specialty license plate issued by the state of Montana.

== Other roles ==
Dolack has served on the board of directors of the Montana Arts Council and the University of Montana Fine Art Advisory Board, and was a delegate from Montana on the Japan Economic Trade Organization in 1995. He also sat on the advisory board of the Big Hole River Foundation in 1999, and has been a member of the board of directors of the Montana chapter of Trout Unlimited since 1995.

Dolack is a founding member of the Japan Club.

A Democrat, Dolack is an avid fly fisherman, hiker, and bird watcher.

== Bibliography ==
- Bottoms, David. Vagrant Grace: Poems. Port Townsend, Wash.: Copper Canyon Press, 1999.
- Cohen, Stan. Wings to the Orient: Pan American Clipper Planes, 1935–1945: A Pictorial History. Missoula, Mont.: Pictorial Histories Publishing Co., 1985.
- George, Charles and George, Linda. Montana. New York: Children's Press, 2000.
- Glendening, John. The Evolutionary Imagination in Late-Victorian Novels: An Entangled Bank. Aldershot, U.K.: Ashgate, 2007.
- Livingston, Peter; Daniel, Joseph; Brittin, Phil; Albers, Susan; and Koster, Susan. The Complete Book of Country Swing & Western Dance, and a Bit About Cowboys. Garden City, N.Y.: Doubleday & Co., 1981.
- McCoy, Michael. Journey to the Northern Rockies. Old Saybrook, Conn.: Globe Pequot Press, 1998.
- McRae, W.C. and Jewell, Judy. Montana. Berkeley, Calif.: Avalon Travel Publishing, 2009.
- Meagher, Mary. Yellowstone and the Biology of Time: Photographs Across a Century. Norman, Okla.: University of Oklahoma Press, 1999.
- Peterson, Eric. Frommer's Montana & Wyoming. Hoboken, N.J.: Wiley, 2010.
- Schullery, Paul. Cowboy Trout: Western Fly Fishing As If It Matters. Helena, Mont.: Montana Historical Society Press, 2006.
- Who's Who in America. 65th ed. Berkeley Heights, N.J.: Marquis Who's Who, 2010. ISBN 0-8379-7029-6
