= Jakki Mohr =

American professor

- Born: Boise, Idaho, US

Academic background
- Education: BBA, Marketing, Boise State University; MA, Marketing, Colorado State University; PhD, Marketing, University of Wisconsin-Madison

Jakki J. Mohr is the Regents Professor of Marketing at the University of Montana. In 2008, she became the first woman in Montana to be named a Regents Professor by the Board of Regents.

== Early life and education ==
Mohr was born and raised in Boise, Idaho, where she also completed her undergraduate degree at Boise State University. She graduated at the top of her class and was the recipient of a national award from The Wall Street Journal for being an "outstanding business graduate." From there, Mohr earned her master's degree in marketing from Colorado State University and her PhD in the same subject from the University of Wisconsin-Madison. During her senior year, she accepted an internship at Hewlett-Packard in Boise, where she worked at the purchasing desk.

== Career ==
Mohr joined the faculty at the University of Montana's School of Business as an associate professor of marketing in 1997 after working at the University of Colorado Boulder. During her early years at the institution, she published her first textbook, Marketing of High-technology Products and Innovations, and was named "Montana's professor of the year" by the Carnegie Foundation for the Advancement of Teaching. By 2002, Mohr was appointed to the rank of full professor and was the recipient of UM's Most Inspirational Teacher of the Year Award. In recognition of her academic achievements, she was also the first woman in Montana to be named a Regents Professor by the Board of Regents.

As a full professor and Poe Family Distinguished Faculty Fellow at the University of Montana College of Business, Mohr was named the Mike Malone Educator of the Year by the Montana Ambassadors. She was also the only academic invited from the United States to participate in a workshop focused on future energy and transportation scenarios held in Saudi Arabia. In the same year, Mohr became an Erskine Fellow at the University of Canterbury.

== Selected publications ==
- Marketing of High-Technology Products and Innovations (2000)
