= Divish =

Divish is a surname. Notable people with the surname include:

- Lukash Divish (born 1986), Russian volleyball player
- Ryan Divish, American sportswriter, blogger, and media personality
