= Jesse Winker =

American baseball player (born 1993)

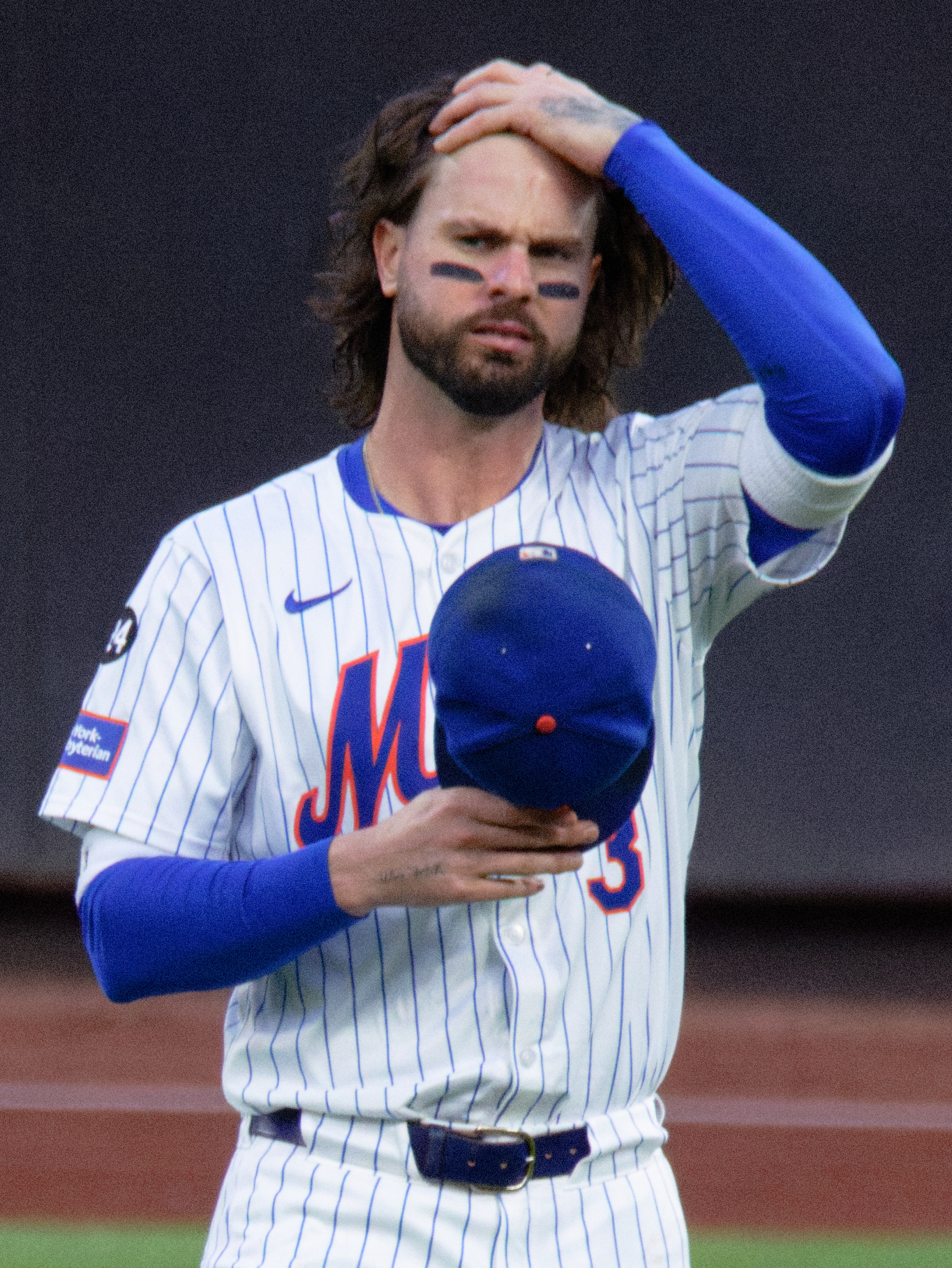
- Winker with the Mets in 2024

Free agent
- Outfielder/Designated hitter
- Born: August 17, 1993 (age 33); Buffalo, New York, U.S.
- Bats: Left Throws: Left

MLB debut
- April 14, 2017, for the Cincinnati Reds

MLB statistics (through 2025 season)
- Batting average: .261
- Home runs: 96
- Runs batted in: 334
- Stats at Baseball Reference

Teams
- Cincinnati Reds (2017–2021); Seattle Mariners (2022); Milwaukee Brewers (2023); Washington Nationals (2024); New York Mets (2024–2025)

Career highlights and awards
- All-Star (2021)

Jesse Winker (born August 17, 1993) is an American professional baseball outfielder and designated hitter who is a free agent. He has previously played in Major League Baseball (MLB) for the Cincinnati Reds, Seattle Mariners, Milwaukee Brewers, Washington Nationals, and New York Mets. He made his MLB debut in 2017 and was an All-Star in 2021.

== Amateur career ==
Winker was born in Buffalo, New York, and lived nearby in Niagara Falls before moving to Orlando, Florida, at the age of seven. He attended Olympia High School in Orlando. As a junior at Olympia, he had a .509 batting average. He had committed to play college baseball at the University of Florida for the Florida Gators, but chose to sign with the Reds rather than attend college.

== Professional career ==
=== Cincinnati Reds ===
The Cincinnati Reds selected Winker in the first round, with the 49th overall selection, of the 2012 Major League Baseball draft. Winker made his professional debut for the Billings Mustangs in 2012. In 62 games, he hit .338/.443/.500 with five home runs in 228 at bats. Prior to the 2013 season, Winker was ranked by Baseball America as the Reds sixth-best prospect. He played the 2013 season with the Dayton Dragons where he became a Midwest League All-Star and Home Run Derby champion. He hit .281/.379/.463 with 16 home runs in 417 at bats over 112 games.

Before the 2014 season, he was ranked by Baseball America as the Reds fourth best prospect. He started the season with the Bakersfield Blaze. In June he was promoted to the Double-A Pensacola Blue Wahoos. In July, Winker played in the All-Star Futures Game, going 1–2. His season came to an end in July after suffering a partially torn tendon in his right wrist in a car accident. In 74 games, he hit .287/.399/.518 with 15 home runs and 57 runs batted in (RBI). Winker returned after the season to play in the Arizona Fall League. Winker spent 2015 with Pensacola, where he posted a .282 batting average with 13 home runs and 55 RBI.

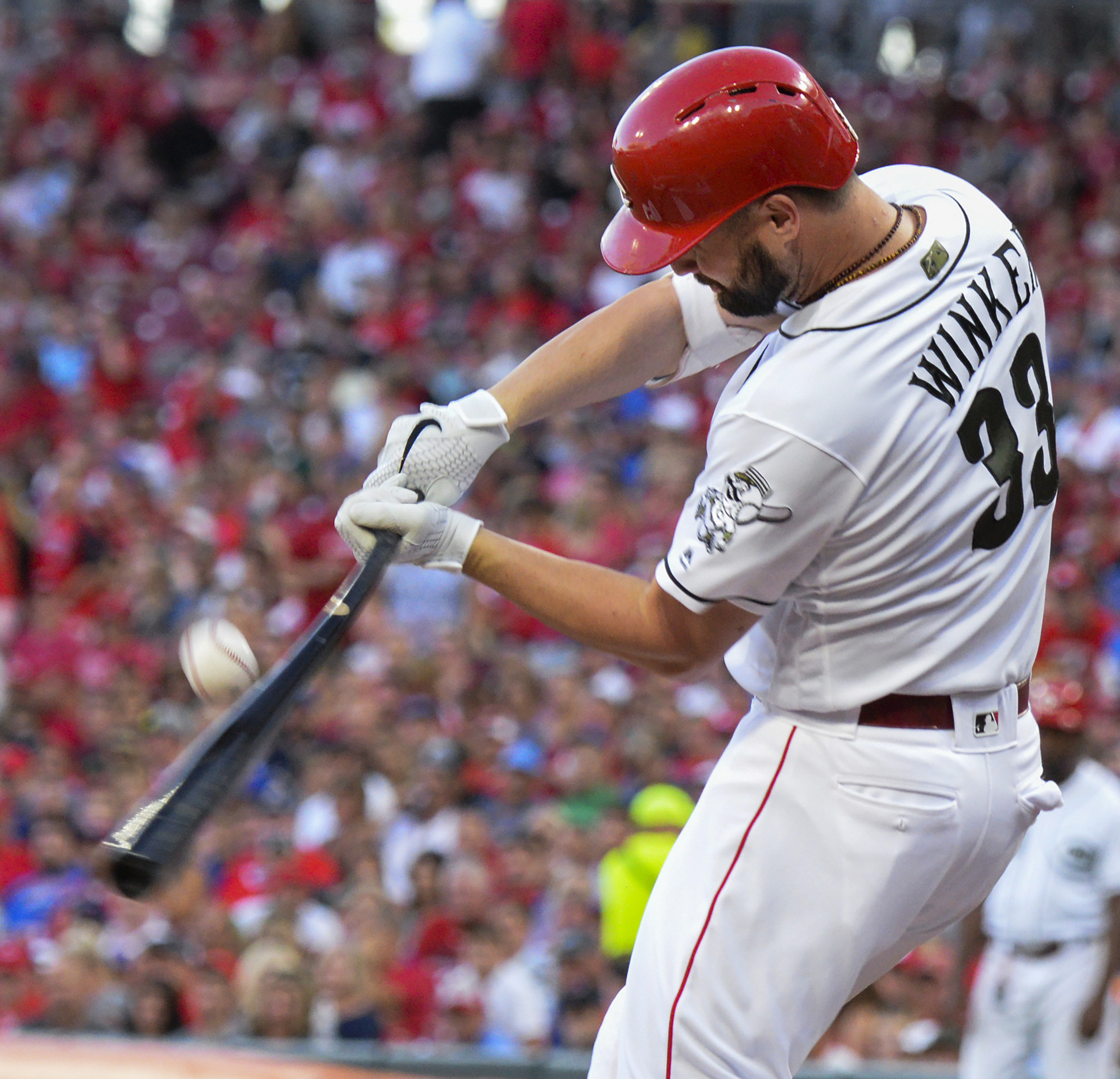
Winker batting for the Reds in 2019

The Reds added Winker to their 40-man roster after the 2016 season, in order to protect him from the Rule 5 draft. He began the 2017 season with the Louisville Bats of the Triple-A International League, and was promoted to the major leagues on April 14. In 2017, Winker batted .298 with seven home runs in 47 games played. Winker began 2018 with Cincinnati, and was a starting outfielder before a right shoulder injury in July ended his season. Prior to his injury, he slashed .299/.405/.431 with seven home runs and 43 RBIs.

In 2019 for Cincinnati, Winker played in 113 games with a batting line of .269/.357/.473 to go along with a career-high 16 home runs as well as 38 RBI. In 2020, Winker played in 54 games for the Reds, slashing .255/.388/.544 with 12 home runs and 23 RBI. He was nominated by MLB.com to play as the designated hitter for the National League Unofficial 2020 All-Star team.

On June 6, 2021, Winker hit three home runs in a narrow 8–7 victory against the St. Louis Cardinals, helping the Reds complete a four-game sweep with his second three-homer game of the year. He also became the first player in Reds history to log multiple 3-homer games in a season. That season, he was named the NL starting right fielder for the All-Star Game.

=== Seattle Mariners ===
On March 14, 2022, the Reds traded Winker and Eugenio Suárez to the Seattle Mariners in exchange for Justin Dunn, Jake Fraley, Brandon Williamson, and a player to be named later, which turned out to be Connor Phillips. The transaction was a cost-cutting measure that saved the franchise just under $36 million, and was unpopular with Reds fans.

On April 24, Winker hit a walk-off single in the bottom of the 12th inning for his first walk-off as a member of the Mariners. Winker and the Mariners agreed to a two-year contract on June 16.

During a June 26 game against the Los Angeles Angels at Angel Stadium, Winker was hit in the thigh by an alleged beanball from Angels pitcher Andrew Wantz. Winker proceeded to charge the Angels dugout and a bench-clearing brawl ensued. He first confronted injured Angels third baseman Anthony Rendon, and Rendon proceeded to strike Winker in the face with his left hand while wearing a cast on his right, then Winker later got into an altercation with Ryan Tepera. Winker was later seen arguing with Angels interim manager Phil Nevin shortly before another skirmish broke out near them. Winker, along with several other players from both the Mariners and Angels, was ejected from the game. Upon leaving the field, Winker flipped off the Angel Stadium crowd sitting behind the visitors' dugout, a gesture for which he later apologized.

In 2022, Winker batted .219/.344/.344 with 14 home runs and 53 RBIs, with a career-worst .688 OPS. After the season, he had surgery on his knee and his neck.

In October 2022, Seattle Mariners beat writer Ryan Divish of the Seattle Times spoke about Winker's work ethic and future with the team. Asked why Winker wasn't with the team during an American League Division Series, Divish said:

I think he was home.... I think they probably just told him to go home.... I think by the end of the season, it's what scouts call a tired act. I just think some of his teammates were done with him, were just tired of putting up with him. I think the team is frustrated with him. Everything that Mitch Haniger does to prepare for a game to get ready, Jesse Winker's kind of the opposite.... I don't think he puts in the time to be better defensively or to have a better arm or any of the work that should be done.... And it's noticeable. Players notice it.... And once you lose your teammates, why be there? So there's gonna be some hard conversations either with Jesse from this front office, or they're just gonna move on.

=== Milwaukee Brewers ===
On December 2, 2022, the Mariners traded Winker and Abraham Toro to the Milwaukee Brewers for Kolten Wong.

In the 2023 regular season, Winker batted .199/.320/.247 in 166 at bats with one home run, 23 RBIs, and 51 strikeouts with the Brewers, with isolated power of .048. He was in the bottom 1% of all major league players in speed, had career lows in his exit velocity (86.8 mph) and hard hit percentage (31.9%), and had a career-high strikeout percentage (25.9%). He played 49 games at DH, and six games in the corner outfield. In the post-season, he went hitless in two at bats. He became a free agent following the season.

=== Washington Nationals ===
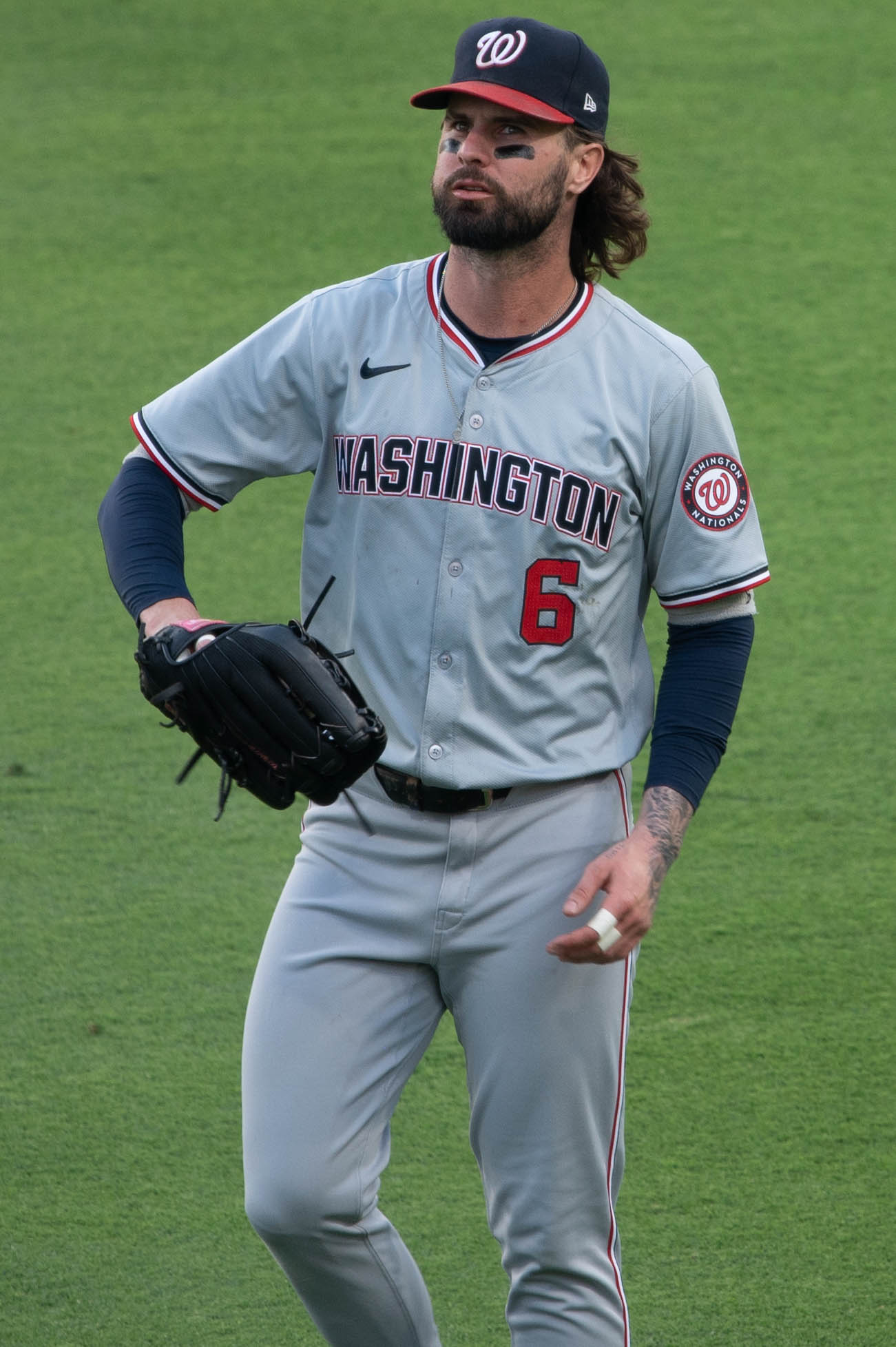
Winker with the Nationals in 2024

On February 12, 2024, Winker signed a minor league contract with the Washington Nationals. On March 24, the Nationals selected Winker's contract, adding him to the major league roster. In 101 games for Washington, he batted .257/.374/.419 with 11 home runs, 45 RBI, and 14 stolen bases.

=== New York Mets ===
On July 28, 2024, the Nationals traded Winker to the New York Mets in exchange for minor league pitcher Tyler Stuart. On August 21, during a game against the Baltimore Orioles, Winker hit his first home run as a Met, a walk-off home run off of pitcher Seranthony Domínguez, giving the Mets a 4–3 victory. In 44 games for the Mets in 2024, Winker batted .243/.318/.365 with 3 home runs and 13 RBI.

On October 8 in the 2024 National League Division Series against the Philadelphia Phillies, Winker hit his first career postseason home run, a solo home run to right field off of pitcher Aaron Nola. In the 2024 MLB postseason, Winker played in 10 games for the Mets, batting .318/.531/.636 with one home run and four RBI. After the season, he became a free agent.

On January 17, 2025, Winker re-signed with the Mets on a one-year, $8 million contract. On May 4, he suffered an oblique strain attempting to throw Brendan Donovan out at home in a 6–5 loss against the St. Louis Cardinals. The next day, Winker was diagnosed with a Grade 2 strain of his right oblique, and was subsequently ruled out for 6–8 weeks. On June 23, he was transferred to the 60-day injured list. Winker was activated on July 8. However, in his first game back, he exited the game due to back tightness, landing on the injured list on July 11. He played in 26 total games for the Mets, hitting .229/.309/.400 with one home run, 10 RBI, and one stolen base. On September 2, manager Carlos Mendoza announced that Winker would be shut down due to a lower back injury, and would likely miss the remainder of the year.

== Personal life ==
Winker has a daughter named Wren. His father, Joe, runs a baseball training facility. His older brother, Joey, was an outfielder/first baseman in the Los Angeles Dodgers organization from 2011-2013.
