= University of Montana Phyllis J. Washington College of Education and Human Sciences =

University of Montana Phyllis J. Washington College of Education
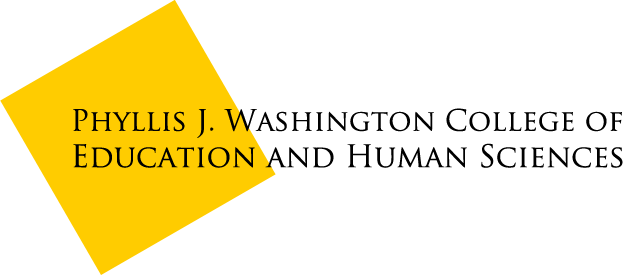
- Former names: School of Education est. 1930
- Type: Public
- Established: 2009
- Dean: Adrea Lawrence, Ph.D.
- Academic staff: 40
- Administrative staff: 9
- Students: 1,340
- Location: Missoula, Montana, USA; 46°51′36″N 113°59′07″W
- Campus: University of Montana
- Website: http://www.coehs.umt.edu

The Phyllis J. Washington College of Education is home to three University of Montana departments: Counselor Education, Curriculum and Instruction, and Educational Leadership.

== History ==
- 1900 - Department of Philosophy and Education taught courses in Theory and Practice of Education and the History of Education in second floor of University Hall
- 1917 - Master of Arts in education and Master of Education were established
- 1930 - Department of Education becomes School of Education
- 1955 - Elementary teachers begin to earn degrees
- 1957 - Division of Educational Research (Institute for Educational Research and Service) and Service began with external funding as a means of supporting graduate education at UM
- 1978 - Department of Health and Physical Education (Department of Health and Human Performance) moved to the School of Education
- 1980 - The Department of Home Economics moved to the School of Education
- 1989 - Department of Home Economics eliminated
- 2008 - Department of Communicative Sciences and Disorders reinstituted
- 2009 - School of Education became the College of Education and Human Sciences
- 2019 - College of Education and Human Sciences becomes the College of Education

== Study ==
=== Departments ===
The College of Education comprises five further departments as well as an Intercultural Youth and Family Development Program.

- Communicative Sciences and Disorders

Focuses on the training of future professionals in the areas of Speech and Language Pathology.

- Counselor Education

Focuses on the training of future school counselors.

- Curriculum and Instruction

Focuses on teacher preparation
Houses both Masters and Doctoral programs

- Educational Leadership
- Health and Human Performance

Began as the Department of Physical Culture in 1906.

- Intercultural Youth and Family Development Program

=== Institute of Educational Research and Service (IERS) ===
Founded in 1957, the Institute of Educational Research and Service is dedicated to the design, evaluation, and dissemination of programs that support the well-being of students and communities. The institution cooperates with numerous organizations to develop models for social and academic achievement

== Hosted Programs ==
=== Montana Digital Academy ===
The Phyllis J. Washington College of Education and is the host of the Montana Digital Academy, Montana's publicly supported K-12 online program. Montana Digital Academy's offices are in the Phyllis J. Washington Education Center.

== New Building ==
In 2009 the university completed the Phyllis J. Washington Education Center, a 27,000 sq. ft. addition to what was then simply known as the Education Building. The Center focuses on Early Childhood Education, Math and Science Instruction and Distance Learning. The center also houses the largest omni globe - a large sphere that projects everything from the world to the planets - at any university in the nation.

The Center was officially unveiled on October 8, 2009 with 500 guests in attendance. Attendance included industrialist Dennis Washington and his wife Phyllis for whom the center is named as well as U.S. Education Secretary Arne Duncan.
