= Montana Kaimin =

Student newspaper in Missoula, Montana

- The last best college news
- Type: Student newspaper
- Format: Weekly print, daily online
- School: The University of Montana
- Editor-in-chief: Henry Doellinger
- News editor: Jack Snow
- Photo editor: Jackson Mailey
- Staff writers: 35
- Founded: 1898
- Headquarters: University of Montana
- Circulation: Select local businesses, University of Montana campus
- Price: Free
- Website: montanakaimin.com

The Montana Kaimin is the University of Montana's student-run independent newspaper located in Missoula, Montana. The paper is printed once a week, Thursday, with special editions printed occasionally and is online at MontanaKaimin.com. The Kaimin covers news, sports, arts and culture, and opinion.

The name "Kaimin" is derived from the Salish Indian word "Q̓ey̓min" and means "something written" or a "message".

== History ==
=== 1898 to early 1900s ===
The Kaimin has been in publication since 1898 and the first issue sold for 15 cents. Charles Pixley was the first editor of the Kaimin. The monthly publication combined artful literary styling of student writers with colorful gossip of campus life. From June 1898 until 1900, the Kaimin was formatted as a monthly magazine. The first weekly edition of the paper was printed in September 1900. In March 1927, the Kaimin began printing twice a week, Tuesday and Friday. The publication changed to daily printing beginning in March 1938, and did so until World War II.

=== 1930s ===
Throughout the Great Depression, the Kaimin only mentioned it twice. The first was in 1932 when the football team lost money. A reason cited was the nationwide economic depression. The Kaimin mentioned the depression when it reported in 1933 that UM professors questioned President Franklin Roosevelt's decision to have a national banking holiday. In 1938, the Kaimin changed physical locations. It moved from the structure known as "The Shack". The building was built to house the Student Army Training Corps during World War I. The Shack proved to be an inefficient facility for the newspaper, so it moved into the newly constructed journalism building.

=== 1940s ===
Throughout World War II, the staff consisted mostly of women. Both the newspaper and the university supported the war, but both felt the war's effect with shrinking enrollment, staff, and budget. The war caused the Kaimin to scale back its production and to revert to publishing the paper twice a week, then just weekly in 1943. This continued until January 1948, when daily publishing Tuesday through Friday resumed. Because campus and paper were predominantly female during the war, much of the Kaimin's news focused on women. A regular column, "Women in the News", ran in 1945. As enrollment rose, the budget for paper became bigger and the Publication Board voted unanimously to increase the salaries for Kaimin employees. The editor's salary increased from $35 a month to $70. In 1949, pressure from the campus administration led to confiscation and destruction of an issue of the Kaimin, which carried a cartoon depicting the Montana Board of Education as rats gnawing at a bag of university funds. Carroll O'Connor, later to become television's Archie Bunker, and Bill Smurr resigned their editing jobs in protest.

=== 1950s ===
On January 17, 1950, the Kaimin was linked to the United Press International Teletype, making it the only college paper in the Rocky Mountains to have the capability to print the latest world news. In 1952, a letter to the editor claimed the Kaimin was being run by the journalism faculty and not by journalism students. The editorial the next day called the letter libelous, but no legal action was taken, eliminating the possibility of a newspaper suing itself for libel. The Kaimin announced it would move to an afternoon schedule early in 1956. Editor Kim Forman wrote, "By changing to a p.m. paper, the Kaimin will be both better written and better read." A month later, the Kaimin abandoned the format and returned to the morning. In 1958, the newspaper defeated over 100 schools and took first place in a national news-writing competition.

=== 1960s ===
During the 1960s, the Kaimin's editor, David Rorvik, received heavy criticism for the editorials published. In October 1965, Rorvik chastised the Roman Catholic Church for its stand on birth control with an editorial titled, "The Contemporary Lay". With the controversial editorials, more than 50 students signed a letter asking for Rorvik's dismissal. Montana Gov. Tim Babcock criticized the paper's view in a phone call to the Kaimin, saying, "I'm the most broad-minded person who's ever sat in this office, but I think the line should be drawn somewhere above that." Even though Rorvik's editorship ended in 1966, controversial news in the Kaimin did not. In February 1967, the paper reported that one or two students visited the UM Health Service each week for treatment of venereal diseases. The number increased to six students a week after spring break and Christmas vacation.

=== 1970s ===
At the beginning of the decade, the Central Board suggested the resignation of UC Program Director Lee Tickell in October 1970 after he could not account for a $26,000 deficit in the Program Council's budget, causing criticism from the Kaimin. Five days later, the Kaimin and editor T.J. Gilles retracted statements made in an editorial that called Tickell a liar, a two-bit huckster, and a tin-horn gambler. Tickell sued, but the suit was dropped. In 1971, the paper's budget showed a $1,000 deficit due to phone bills. Another controversy occurred in 1974. when editor Carey Yunker wrote an editorial calling Printing Services Director Al Madison a "congenital liar". Madison filed a $102,000 libel suit. The University of Montana settled the libel suit without a trial and paid Madison more than $10,000.

=== 1980s and 1990s ===
Starting in January 1983, the Kaimin printed off campus for the first time since publication began, but was still printed in black and white. The Missoulian took the printing duties, and the change created a tabloid-sized page. Later in 1984, the Kaimin apologized after negative reactions to a satirical issue titled the "Montana Enquirer", which poked fun at a local political activist's weight. The story was titled, "Reporter squished by 300-pound Republican". To cut costs, the Kaimin reduced the number of issues printed from 7,000 to 6,000 in 1991.

=== 2000s ===
In 2009, Bobby Hauck became the subject of national controversy when he refused to take questions from the Kaimin following the paper's story about an alleged assault by two Grizzly football players.

=== 2010s ===
In the fall of 2010, the Kaimin changed to a tabloid format once a week, known as the Friday Kaimin. The new format put a focus on long-form feature stories, in a more magazine-like fashion. After a significant budget deficit in the spring of 2015, the Kaimin permanently moved to a weekly publication schedule to cut costs and focus on web-first reporting.

=== 2020s ===
With the onset of the COVID-19 pandemic in March 2020, the Kaimin continued to print despite the campus becoming a ghost town. That fall, the staff worked in a hybrid fashion to create the weekly paper. No editions were missed throughout the entire state of emergency. The paper shifted to printing on Thursdays in April 2021 after the Missoulian sold its building, eliminating the only commercial printing press in western Montana. The Kaimin is now printed in Helena.

== Location ==
The Kaimin office is located in the University of Montana School of Journalism building on the second floor.

== Format ==
Throughout the 1930s, the Kaimin was formatted in broadsheet, eight-column form. In 1939, the Kaimin changed to a five-column daily paper for two academic quarters. The format change was considered a success and was made permanent. In the spring semester of 2015, due to budget constraints, the Kaimin reduced its publication to once a week. The Kaimin now publishes weekly on Thursdays during the academic year and daily online.

== Web presence ==
The paper was available to the world over the Internet, known as Kaimin On Line, in 1994. Since then, the online website has been referred to as just the Montana Kaimin. In fall 2010, weekly online video "webisodes" were added, including AJ Versus, in which a staff member faces a University of Montana athlete in different challenges, and Kaimin Desk Concerts, a live musical performance in the Kaimin offices. The Kaimin now publishes daily on its website, which includes web-unique media and breaking news.

The Kaimin Cast

In August 2021, the Kaimin’s first audio editor, Austin Amestoy, with support from then-editor-in-chief Addie Slanger, kickstarted the Kaimin’s first-ever weekly news podcast. Dubbed “The Kaimin Cast,” it followed an interview-style format, producing episodes every week tied to that week’s cover story in the print issue of the Kaimin.

In January 2022, the audio department added an audio reporter to produce a segment called “The Second Look,” in which the audio reporter produced a brief, weekly follow-story on the topic of the previous week’s main Kaimin Cast episode.

In April 2022, the Kaimin Cast was selected by National Public Radio as one of the best college podcasts in the United States for its episode “What’s bringing bears into Missoula?”

As of May 2022, the Kaimin Cast had published more than 40 episodes and amassed more than 3,500 downloads. Elinor Smith succeeded Amestoy as the next audio editor and Kaimin Cast host.

== Missed print dates ==
The printing of the Kaimin was delayed a week in May 1922 due to workers striking at the Missoulian Publishing Company.
