= Breaking Clean =

2002 memoir by Judy Blunt

- Book cover
- Author: Judy Blunt
- Illustrator: ISIS Large Print Books
- Language: English
- Subject: Rural American Life
- Genre: Memoir
- Published: 10 January 2002
- Publisher: ISIS Large Print Books Alfred A. Knopf Vintage Books
- Publication place: United States
- Media type: Print (Hardcover) Print (Paperback) E-book
- Pages: 371 pp (first edition)
- Awards: PEN/Jerard Fund Award for work in progress (1997), Whiting Writers' Award (2001), Willa Award for memoir/nonfiction (2003), Mountains and Plains Book Award (2003), Guggenheim Fellowships U.S. and Canada(2006).
- ISBN: 9780753198223
- Text: Breaking Clean at Wikisource

Breaking Clean is a memoir by Judy Blunt, published in 2002, after a decade in the writing. The book is about Blunt's life in the countryside of eastern Montana, in the United States. In the book the author describes her childhood, and how growing up on a ranch conditioned her whole life.

The memoir is regarded as Blunt's most notable work. It won the 1997 PEN/Jerard Fund Award for a work in progress and the 2001 Whiting Writers' Awards. The book appeared on the list of The New York Times' Notable Books 2002.

== Description ==
The first edition of the book is a hardcover 371 pages long, containing an acknowledgments section consisting of an acclaim page, an introduction to the book, a photograph of the author with her two younger siblings, an information page about the edition, a Joan Didion quote, and a map of Phillips County, where the story is set. The content is divided into 14 chapters:

- "Breaking Clean": The opening chapter is a retelling and summary of Judy's life.
- "A Place of One's Own": This chapter describes Judy's parents move to their own ranch and the birth of the twins.
- "Salvage": This tells the story of the introduction of electricity at the ranch, and the changes it brought to their lives.
- "Church and State": This chapter is about when Judy starts school at South First Creek School, at the age of five.
- "Lessons in Silence": The chapter is about Judy's first encounter with outsiders, and the isolation created by ranch life.
- "Fighting Fire": The chapter summarizes a large fire that threatened the ranches, and the community joining together to fight it.
- "Ajax": This chapter contains several stories about how people on the ranches saw animals and their purpose.
- "The Year of the Horse": This chapter includes the story of when Gail, Judy's younger sister, entered a bull enclosure.
- "Learning Curves": This describes when Judy moved to Malta to start her freshman year in high school, and her difficulty fitting in.
- "The Reckoning": The chapter is about Judy's sophomore year of high school in Malta.
- "Learning the Ropes": In this chapter Judy describes her first months of being a ranch wife.
- "Winter Kill": This is about when her daughter got sick and the difficulties of getting to hospital due to heavy rains.
- "Night Shift": The chapter tells the story of calving on the ranch.
- "Afterword: Leaving Home": In the final chapter Judy describes leaving the ranch to start a new life.

The chapters "Breaking Clean" and "Lessons in Silence" and a portion of "Learning Curves" were originally published, in slightly different form, in Northern Lights magazine, while the chapter "Salvage" was originally published in Big Sky Journal magazine.

== Plot ==
The book narrates the author's story from before her birth, intertwining it with her current life, and explains how her life changed after she left the ranch.

=== The family and life before Judy's birth ===
Judy's family is the fourth generation of a ranching family. The author describes the difficult moments that her parents had to deal with, when three years after they were married they decided to establish their own ranch. The main problems included lack of economic resources and the working of the land to make it viable. All the difficulties with starting their own place were interconnected with her birth in 1954, since Judy's mother was pregnant with her at the time.

=== Ranch life ===
Map of Montana highlighting Phillips County

The book describes the hardship of growing up as a girl on a ranch in Phillips County, in a social context in which boys were more valued. It was the male kittens that were kept, and the community applauded the birth of stud colts, bull calves and male babies. When Judy was young she played cowboys and Indians with her siblings, but there was a difference in what was expected from a girl and a boy. In the community, several women were capable of riding horses, herding cattle and harvesting, but they were always expected to return to their own chores. Although Judy acted like a boy, she still had to learn women’s chores and to develop as a woman, in order to find a good marriage prospect.

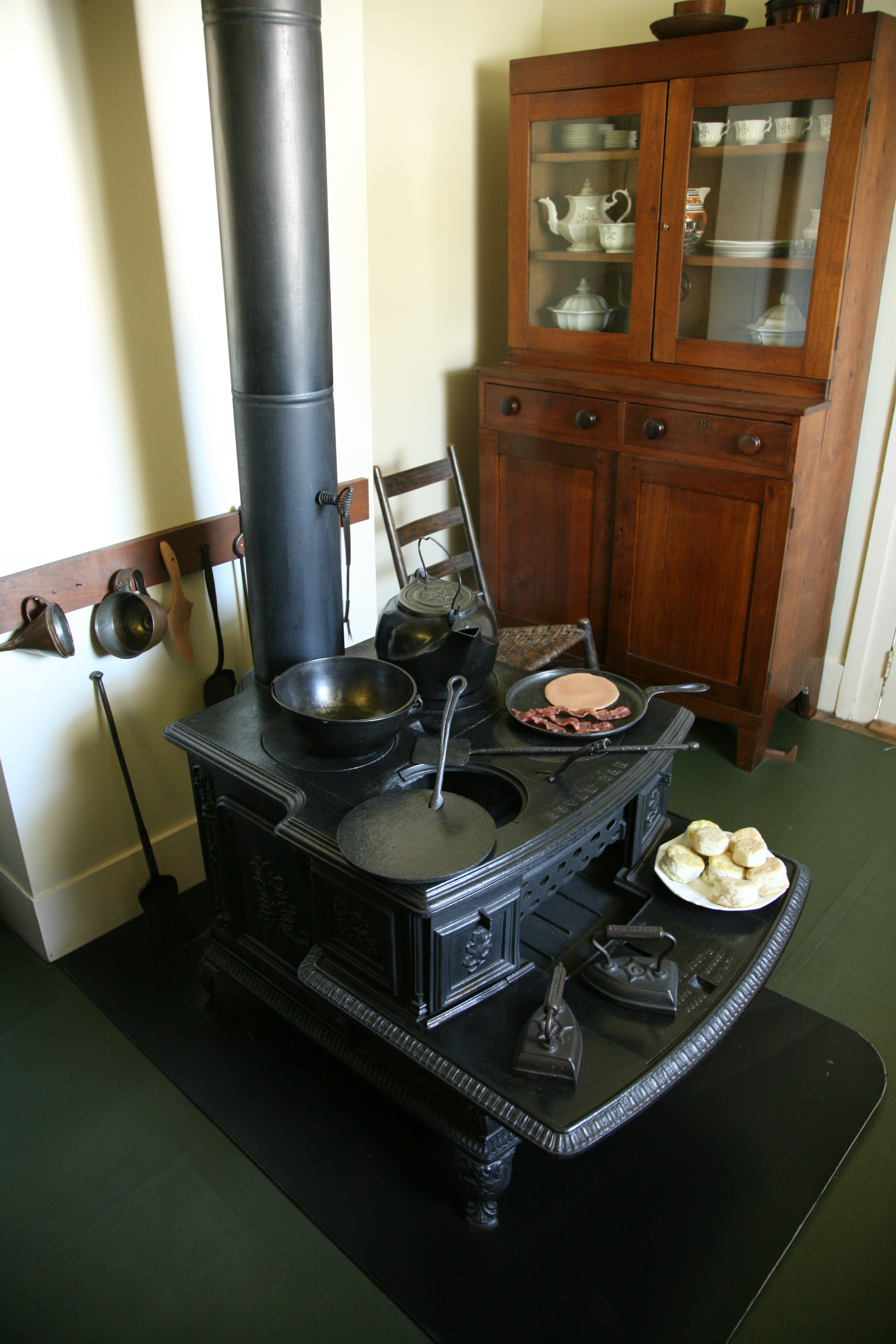
Cook Stove

Between the ages of five and thirteen Judy went to South First Creek School. Her class consisted of students of many different ages, which resulted in difficulties for the teacher in controlling the class. Every morning the teacher did a health inspection. If they passed the inspection, they got a gold star.

Judy's little sister Gail was a very good storyteller and people would listen to her stories with excitement. Judy realized that she was not as good at telling stories but was better at writing them, so she secretly started to write poems and witty news on tablet paper to tell stories.

When starting high school, Judy had to move into the city, Malta. It was different from what she was used to and she had never seen girls look and behave the way they did. She lived on her own at this point, and got a job to be able to afford clothes and makeup in order to fit in. When the twins started high school, her mother decided to move with them to Malta and they all moved into Judy's grandmother's house, which made Judy's life more isolated. She got into a lot of trouble during this time, until she moved back to the ranch.

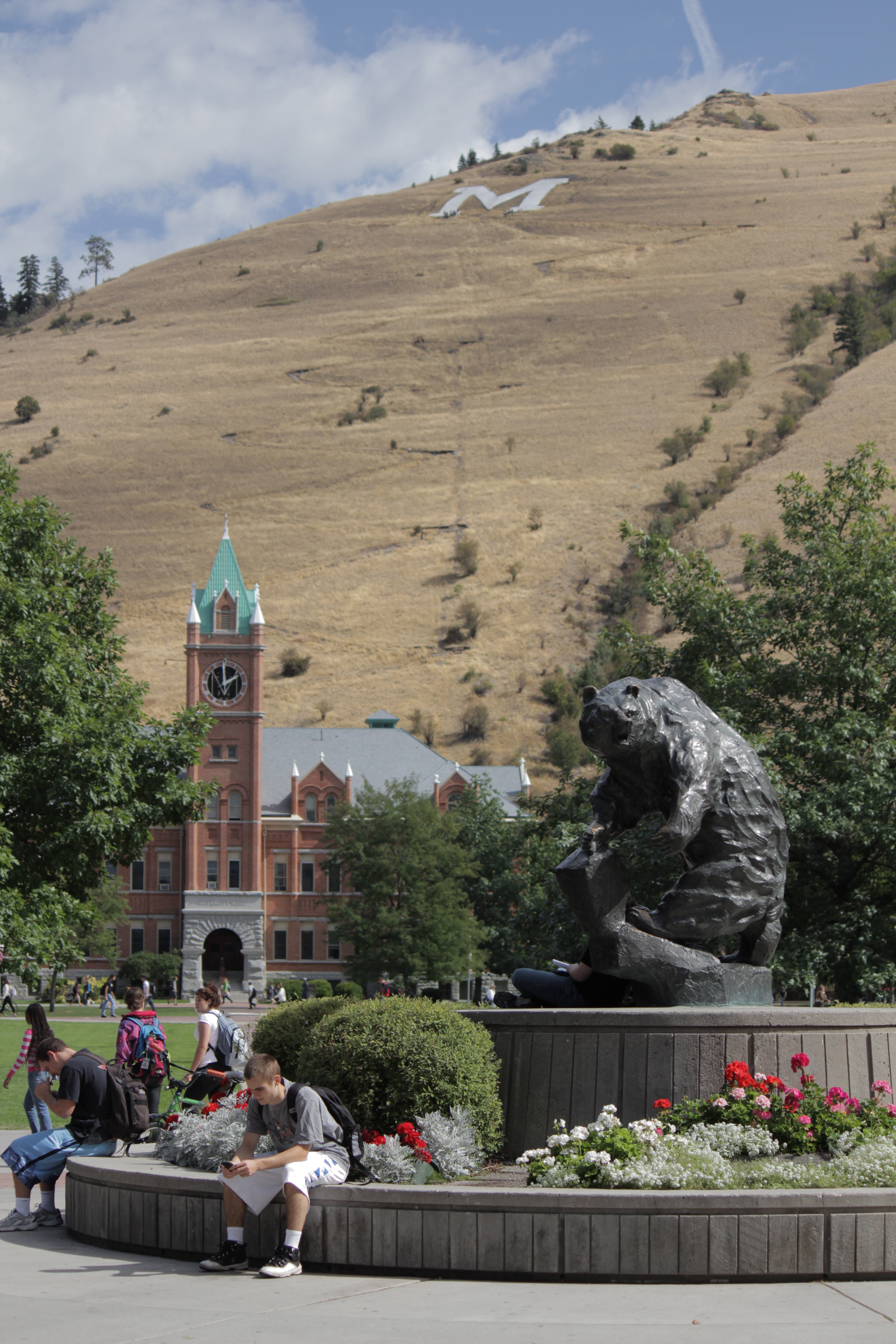
University of Montana

When Judy was 15 years old, John, a 27-year-old bachelor neighbor, started courting her, and a year and a half later he asked Judy's father for her hand and they were engaged. After Judy and John were married, they took over John's family's main ranch house. At the beginning of their marriage, Judy felt that John's father and stepmother were constantly controlling her every move. The period after their children were born is described as an exhausting time—taking care of the garden, three kids and three men, while still keeping up with the household work.

=== Life after the ranch ===
In August 1986, Judy left Phillips County out of frustration, with a divorce and three children, and within days she started her freshman year at the University of Montana. It was difficult to find a job that fitted around classes and the family. Eventually she started working in construction, sanding floors to earn enough money to feed her children. It was around this time that she found her voice again and began to write.

The author explains how her children grew up differently than she or her parents did, as they did not have to face the hard work of country life and the strict education dictated by her parents.

== Narrative structure ==
The story is structured without a sequential time of events: the narrative is full of flashbacks (both internal and external analepses). There are several types of narrative sequences: narration, descriptions, dialogues, together with the author's thoughts, like internal monologues. The background continuously changes from one paragraph to another. The narrative is always characterized by the stream-of-consciousness voice.

For the narrative structure, the author uses a peculiar strategy, which creates two different stylistic and temporal dimensions. In fact, the narration itself follows a linear chronology of the events, so the plot is a straight line which respects the relation between story and plot. However, the author seasons the narration with flashbacks, personal comments and thoughts on the events, stopping the narration and zeroing time in the linear chronology.

Moving the attention onto the narrative structure of the main character, the author herself, reviewers refer to her as the "ego in the centre" character, which means that all of the narration develops around her and everything that happens must be seen and understood by her point of view. That's also known as "the model of the onion", as the narrative structure follows the stratifications of the main character. Moreover, this model affected the presentation and the role of the other characters who take part in the story; All their actions and physical descriptions depend on the view of the author/protagonist; They are one of the figurative stratifications of this "onion" who is Judy Blunt. Some critics also asserted that the narrative structure is continuously shaped in this production by a metaphysical presence or element that belongs to the liberal and old-feminists way of interpreting writing; in fact, as Judy Blunt says, writing was a way to escape the ranch sexist hierarchy and at the same time a concealed way to protest against a minor role of women in society. This critique was made because, according to the reviewers, the reader is almost forced to adapt their view to the writer's in relation to these social issues, making more genuine the core of the book.

This could be considered in every aspect a biographical production, however, the author has a wide freedom in the literal and stylistic choices, as it is a personal narration of her life that goes beyond the writing style, but all the canons of genre have been respected.

== Characters ==
=== Main characters ===
- Judy: Judy is the author of the book. She was born in 1954 and the book recounts her life written from her perspective in first person.
- Judy's parents: The author describes her parents as very different from each other. When they married, her father was a 20-year-old cowboy, while her mother, Shirley, was a divorced 28-year-old woman with a four-year-old child, Margaret, born from her previous marriage. She describes her mother as a peculiar woman who attended college for two years, but who was also able to manage a house, a farm, and a family since youth. Judy describes their behaviour regarding her emotions that they did not approve of or did not understand as "blind", as they did not seem to even acknowledge it; for example, when Judy at 17 was home alone, she drank two glasses of her father's whiskey and repeatedly punched her left hand through a glass door, wearing her new engagement ring, and then smeared blood all over doors, mirrors and walls. After taking her to the hospital to treat her injured hand, her mother cleaned the house in silence, and neither of her parents ever wanted to know the gesture, not even after the publication of the book.
- John: John is her ex-husband, 12 years older than her and a Vietnam veteran. He started courting Judy when she was 15 and he was 27. Years after they married, Judy and John faced relationship issues and sought help from a marriage counselor. Judy depicts him in a nonjudgmental way as a fair and patient man, yet weak-willed when it came to taking a stand against the patriarchal monopoly.

=== Secondary characters ===
- Judy's children: Judy has three children; Jeanette, Jason and James. Jeanette was born two years after Judy's marriage to John. Seventeen months after Jeanette was born Judy gave birth to her first son Jason, and two and a half years later James was born.
- Margaret: Margaret is the author's stepsister, born from her mother's previous marriage and eight years older than the author. She started her studies at Malta High School at the age of 12 and graduated at 16. Even before she left home to study at college, or to work during the summer, she used to visit the family at the ranch only during weekends and holidays.
- Kenny: Kenny is Judy's brother and around 20 months older than Judy.
- The twins: The twins, Gary and Gail, are Judy's younger brother and sister.

== Background ==
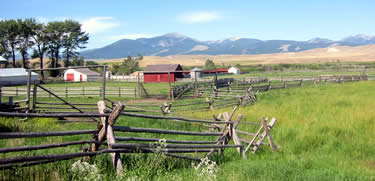
An Example of a Typical Montana Ranch

The story is set in Phillips County on a remote ranch in northeastern Montana, where Judy was born: more than one hour's drive on difficult dirt roads to the nearest town, Malta. As the author herself wrote in the first pages of the book, the town was blessed by a wide community of writers and therefore she had the possibility to get in touch with this world early and frankly.

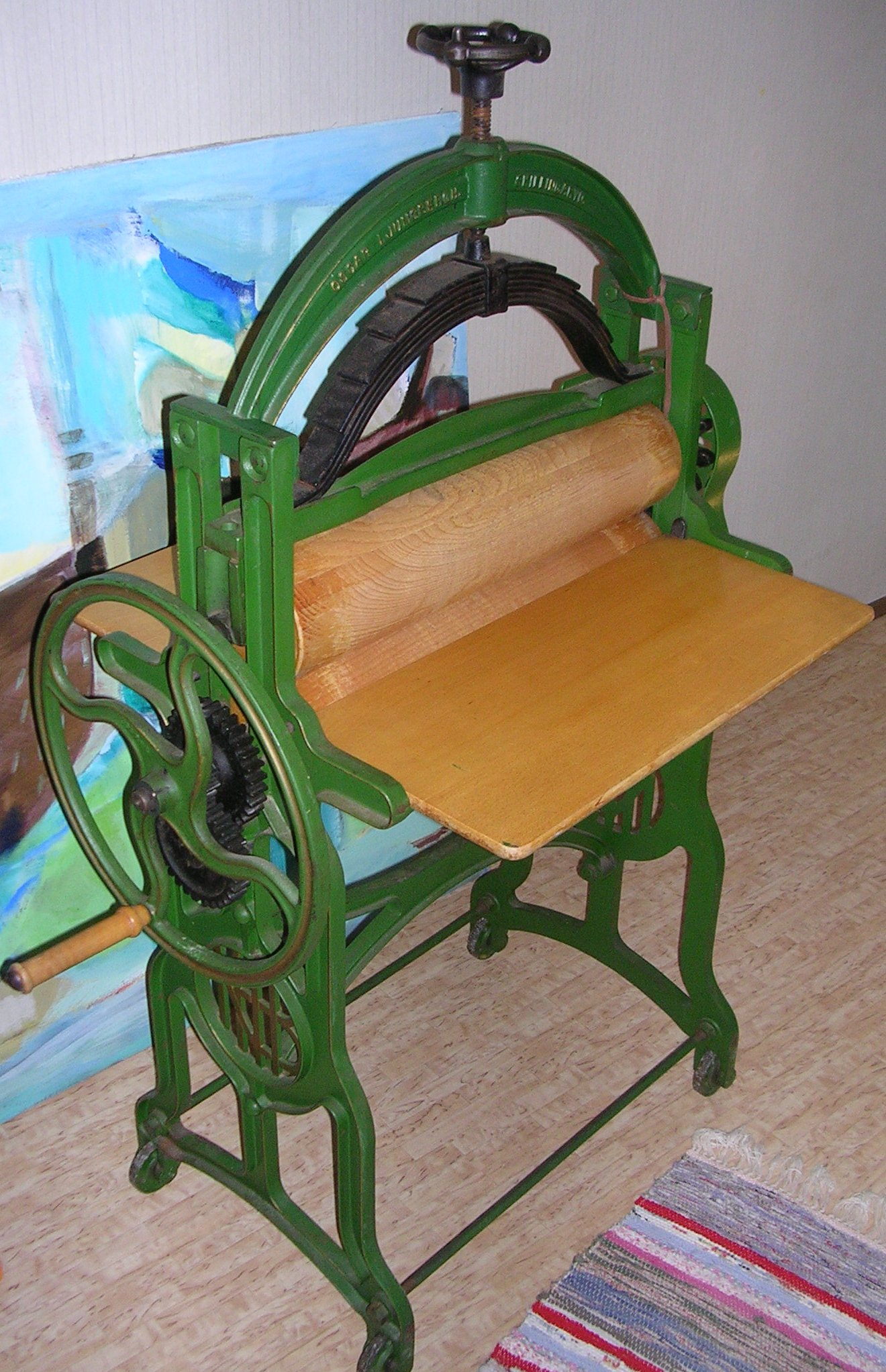
Wringer Washing Machine

The cattle farm on which the author grew up was a typical ranch, described by Judy as livable and long-lasting, although not charming. The threshold was surrounded by a porch, decorated with linoleum cabbage flowers. The kitchen consisted of a square kitchen table, a double-oven cook stove, and a washbasin. Judy's bedroom, shared with her sister, had a foldaway cot and was next to the bathroom, which was provided with a wringer washing machine, a claw-foot bathtub and a pump used to obtain the household water. Several improvements to the house were made with the introduction of electricity in the ranch in the late 50s. The environment which surround the story enforces the differences that came about between the "dutiful wife" and the "marlboro man"; in fact during those years women still lived in a sexist society, and the author enriches the stylistic choice of elements which underline the differences that occur between male figures and female figures.

As a young ranch wife, I wed my sixties-style feminism to a system of conflicting expectations and beliefs only slightly altered by a century of mute nobility. My brand of feminism celebrated strength through silence. A woman could do anything, so long as she did it quickly, quietly and efficiently. It never occurred to me then that silence looked passive from the outside, or that the two served the same purpose of not making waves, maintaining the status quo. It would take me ten years of doing it all to finally get it. The work we do isn't the issue. Work is the tool that wears us down, draws us in and keeps our eyes on the next two steps ahead. The issue is power. And it's the silence that kills us.

— Judy Blunt, Breaking Clean, chapter 9, Learning Curves.

The sexist environment Judy lived in influenced her life as a writer, even if in her community there were many people who had already undertaken this career, as often writing for her was an escape from ranch life.

=== Writers community ===
Judy Blunt has identified the wide range of writers in the community of Missoula, and is part of a writing circle in the area. After her ranch life, she attended the University of Montana, which represented a turning point in her story as a writer. This university has a reputation for literature faculties, high quality of teaching and mix of people from different backgrounds. Montana is a northern state of the confederation of the United States, near to the Canadian border, still featured by a wild and virgin nature and its position made this territory attractive for people from different backgrounds: Canadians, French, Eastern Europeans, English, Americans from the South looking for virgin and uncontaminated forests, and many others. The university's Faculty of Literature is attended by aspirant writers, who share their backgrounds and ideas and stimulate the birth of new and effective writing styles. In this environment, many people decide to become writers and often obtain successful results, as in the case of Judy Blunt.

Due to this high quantity of successful writers, some of them have founded a non profit organization, the Missoula Writers Collaborative, in which many old and new authors, most of whom come from University of Montana, take part to keep the traditions of creative writing by placing "writers in school classrooms, after-school programs, youth homes and other venues to show young people the power of words and help them find their voices as writers".

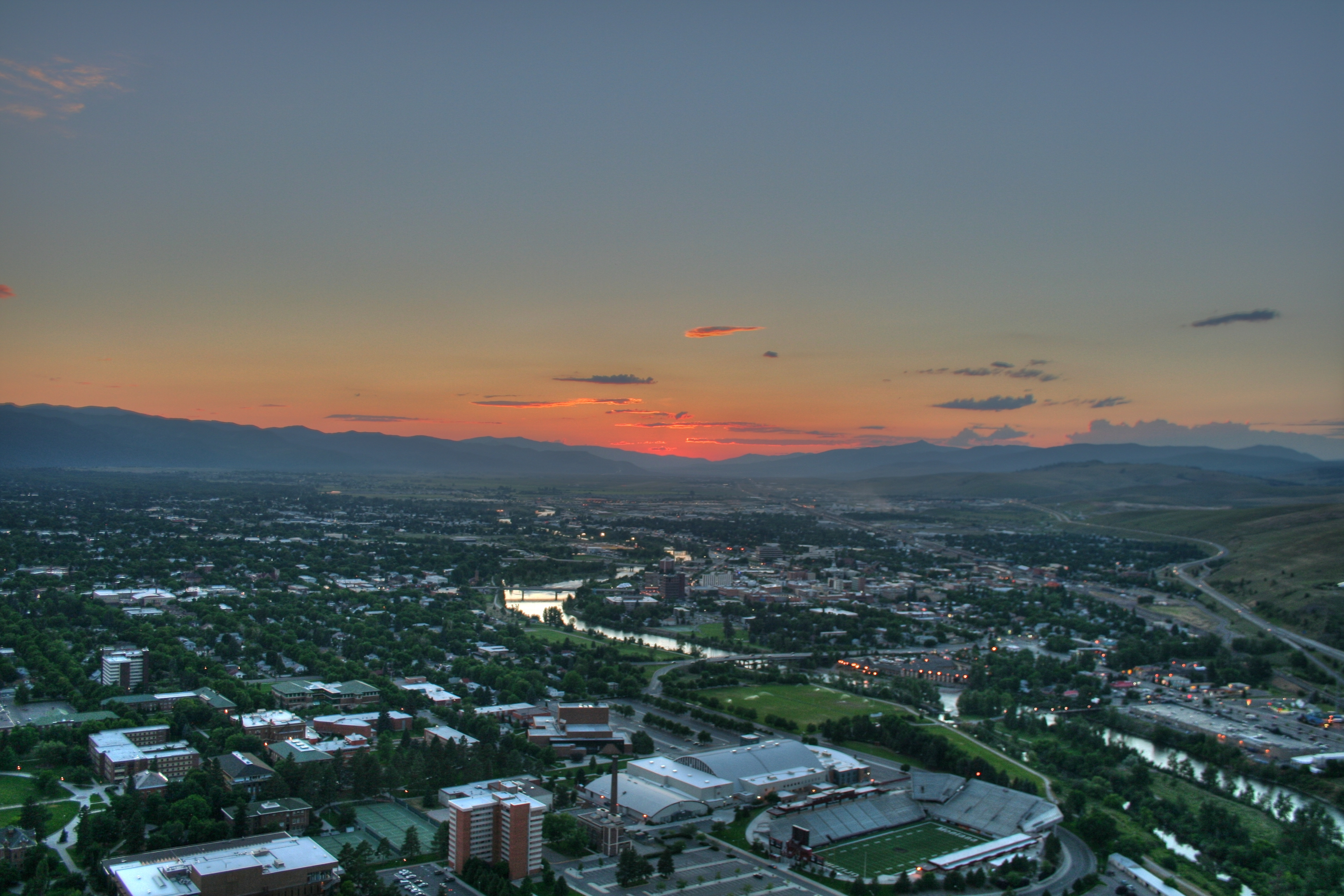
Missoula Sunset (2006-07)

As one of the professors of the faculty says, thanks to the success of "Breaking Clean" and other books, the writers and the university together have been able to identify a model, "the writing school of Missoula, Montana" as the French call it, and export this writing circle model to other universities. Montana has a reputation of being a rough country that exports raw materials, and the people of Montana were considered to a certain extent "brutal" as prejudicial. However, thanks to this constantly growing heritage of publications and the mission of the writers' organization in the University of Montana, they are projecting onto the world a sophisticated and cultural dimension of Missoula and of Montana.

== Controversies ==
When the book was published, it caused trouble in her hometown of northeast Montana. Blunt's ex-husband described himself as "shell-shocked" and added that "a lot of people in this county are disturbed", while her parents were reluctant to discuss the substance of the memoir. "Judy sure has a way with words" is all her mother, Shirley, would say. The author's former father-in-law accused her of fabricating a scene in the opening chapter, which was originally a classroom essay that she wrote in her sophomore year of college. In the chapter she recounted how one day her father-in-law, furious at her for being late at the table for lunch, took her new typewriter outside and "killed it with a sledgehammer". Blunt's former in-laws publicly repudiated the account, stating that no such thing had ever happened, and later Blunt admitted that she wrote that as an essay and when trying to fit her life into four pages for the classroom exercise, she wrote "more of a prose poem" and the episode was meant to be read symbolically, to represent what she had to endure on her husband's ranch.

This particular scene in Blunt's essay is what in 1993 landed her a $100,000 advance for the memoir she had only begun to write, and Ms Desser, her editor, convinced her to make that essay the first chapter in the book, not without considerable objection from the author. Ms Desser commented that the essay "compresses the essence of her book the same way that an overture contains an entire piece of music," adding that she was not aware of the factual problems. To avoid further controversies the publisher decided to delete the episode from future editions of the book. "The metaphor was perfect, but in a book of nonfiction one cannot defend using an image like that at the expense of another person. If it did not occur, except metaphorically, I should not have put it in this book," Blunt commented, clearly embarrassed by the mistake, and added "I hope this can be taken in perspective and it does not become what my book is about. It is ironic that I worked ten years writing this book and four hours writing this essay. But there it is. It is just one of them things."

When Judy left the ranch at the age of 32 with her small children, her family felt that she left for no good reason. Her husband did not treat her badly, as in he did not beat her, he was not a drunk, he did not chase other women, and their ranch was doing well. After the book was published, they avoided commenting on the matter discussed in the book. "My parents are of the old school," Blunt said, "if you say to them you feel a certain way and they don't understand or approve of the way you feel, they say, 'No you don't'." Her family was hurt by her decision to leave and worried about how she would survive, but today they have mended their relationship. Her parents recently sold most of their 15,000-acre ranch and most of the cattle shortly after the publication of the memoir and have retired into town, while her ex-husband remarried and still lives on his ranch.

== Reception ==
The book has been reviewed by a number of national magazines and newspaper in the United States:

- "Staunch and unblinking, with sentences as strong and upright as well-tended fence posts…A valuable addition to the literature of place and the literature of passage." – The Washington Post
- “Riveting. … This masterful debut is utterly strange, suspenseful and surprising—a story whose threads connecting past and present are as transparent as cobwebs but as strong as barbed wire." – Time Out
- "Scarily good—so right on, so focused, so in-your-face that you have to take the book slowly to cushion the blow." – National Geographic Adventure
- "Unflinching. … A sense of mourning underlies [Blunt's] account, and she honors the land that she still loves by making us intimate with its smallest details." – The New Yorker
- "A beautifully written memoir that is a meditation on how land and her life will always be intertwined. … Blunt's life has furnished her with the kind of strength most of us can only envy." – San Francisco Chronicle
- "Breathtaking. ... Blunt's writing is visceral, yet never without humor and a raw, fierce honesty." – Chicago Tribune

== Editions ==
- January 10, 2002 first edition by ISIS Large Print Books (Hardcover)
- January 28, 2002 by Alfred A. Knopf (Paperback)
- February 5, 2002 by Alfred A. Knopf (Hardcover)
- January 7, 2003 by Vintage Books (Paperback)
- June 1, 2004 by ISIS Large Print Books (Paperback)
- April 20, 2016 by Vintage Books (E-book edition)

== Awards ==
- PEN/Jerard Fund Award for work in progress (1997)
- Whiting Writers' Award (2001)
- Willa Award for memoir/nonfiction (2003)
- Mountains and Plains Book Award (2003)
- Guggenheim Fellowships U.S. and Canada(2006)
