= Camas (magazine) =

Environmental studies literary journal published by the University of Montana

Camas: The Nature of the West
- Summer 2007 Issue
- Categories: Nature, Environment, American West, Culture
- Frequency: Semianual
- Publisher: Camas; University of Montana
- Founded: 1992
- Country: United States
- Language: American English
- Website: www.umt.edu/camas

Camas: The Nature of the West is a non-profit literary journal run by graduate students of the Environmental Studies Program at the University of Montana. Established in 1992, Camas publishes non-fiction, fiction, poetry and photography on nature, place, and culture of the American West. The magazine produces two issues per year.

== Recognition ==
Camas has been recognized in national magazines such as Utne Reader and High Country News for its unique mixture of personal essays, photos, and poetry related to life in the west with its cohabitation of people and wildlife. The magazine was also recognized by the travel magazine Matador Network as the #7 "Magazines, Journals, and Blogs Every Travel Writer Should Know About" in 2009.

== Contributors ==
An array of both established and emerging authors and photographers have contributed to Camas. The following is a list of notable writers who have appeared in the journal:

- Rick Bass
- Wendell Berry
- Judy Blunt
- Ron Carlson
- Craig Childs
- David James Duncan
- Derrick Jensen
- William Kittredge
- Ellen Meloy
- Richard Nelson
- Robert Michael Pyle
- Janisse Ray
- Chip Rawlins
- Annick Smith
- Rebecca Solnit
- Kim Stafford
- Fatemeh Varzandeh
