= University of Montana Herbarium =

Coordinates: 46.8613°N 113.9838°W

The University of Montana Herbarium is a herbarium located at the University of Montana in Missoula, Montana. It is open by appointment only.

The herbarium contains over 129,000 plant specimens, and is the world's largest and finest collection of Northern Rocky Mountains flora. Its primary mission is to collect and preserve specimens from the Western Cordillera and Great Plains but collections span a wider taxonomic and geographic range.

About 60% of the 120,000 vascular plant specimens are from Montana itself, a state with diverse plant communities, including Great Plains prairies, Great Basin sagebrush steppes, boreal forests, Northern Rockies alpine communities, and the eastern limit of the moist conifer forests of the Pacific Northwest. The non-Montana collections include many duplicate specimens from Wyoming, Idaho, Utah and Nevada.

The herbarium has a rich history, and its vascular plant collection represents over 100 years of botanical research in Montana, with hundreds of specimens from important early collectors, including C. Bessey, F. D. Kelsey, Marcus Jones and W. N. Suksdorf. That said, however, its greatest strength lies in more recent collections. Over 20,000 (28%) of the Montana vascular plant specimens were collected in the past 30 years by Prof. Klaus Lackschewitz or Peter Lesica. These newer specimens have location data accurate to the nearest square mile, making them a particularly useful resource for ecological and biogeographical studies.
