= List of projects, centers, and institutes at the University of Montana =

The University of Montana is home to a variety of institutes ranging from Health to Business to Public Policy. UM is home to a variety of institutes and research centers with many regarding ecology, environmentalism, wildlife preservation, Native American Issues, and health.

== Projects, centers, and institutes ==
=== Biological sciences ===
- Avian Science Center
- Herbarium
- Montana Biotechnology Center
- Montana Ecology of Infectious Diseases
- Murdock DNA Sequencing Facility

=== Business and trade ===
- Bureau of Business & Economic Research
- Montana World Trade Center

=== Education ===
- Center for Teaching Excellence
- Institute for Educational Research and Service
- Montana Geriatric Education Center
- Montana Partners In Ecology
- Multicultural Learning Solutions
- Schwanke Honors Institute

=== Environment and nature ===
- Center for Riverine Science and Stream Re-naturalization
- Greening UM
- Institute for Tourism & Recreation Research
- Lubrecht Experimental Forest
- Montana Climate Center
- Montana Cooperative Wildlife Research Unit (MT CWRU)
- Montana Environmental Consortium
- Montana Natural History Center
- Mount Sentinel Vegetation Management & Restoration
- Northern Rocky Mountain Science Center - Missoula Field Station
- Paleontology Center
- Wilderness Information Network
- Wilderness Institute
- Yellow Bay–Flathead Lake Biological Station

=== Health ===
- Biomedical Research Infrastructure Network (BRIN)
- Center for Environmental Health Sciences
- Institute for Gerontology Education
- International Heart Institute
- Montana Cancer Institute Foundation
- Montana Center for Childhood Trauma
- Montana Center for Work Physiology and Exercise Metabolism
- Montana Neuroscience Institute Foundation
- National Rural Bioethics Project
- Center for Structural and Functional Neuroscience
- Physical Therapy Clinic
- Rural Institute on Disabilities

=== Humanities ===
- Center for Ethics
- Environmental Writing Institute
- Montana Committee for the Humanities

=== Native American issues ===
- Indian Law Clinic
- Native American Center of Excellence–Skaggs School of Pharmacy

=== Public policy and service ===
- Maureen and Mike Mansfield Center
- Maureen and Mike Mansfield Foundation
- Montana Public Policy Research Institute
- Montana Technology Corps

=== Regional issues ===
- O'Connor Center for the Rocky Mountain West

=== Science, general ===
- National Science Foundation–EPSCOR
- Partnership for Comprehensive Equity (PACE)

=== Other ===
- Center for Work-Based Learning
- English Language Programs
