= Gen Huit =

American singer-songwriter

Gen Huit is a Salish-Pend Oreille singer-songwriter from Saint Paul, Minnesota, who is known for her presentations on Native American life and culture at Glacier National Park and for singing about justice for Native American peoples.

== Biography ==
She was raised by her grandparents, and attended the University of Montana. She went on to teach fourth grade at Mission Elementary School, on the Fort Belknap Reservation, in Hays, Montana.

Her play, "Beansy and Peasy," was performed by the Salish Kootenai College Center of Traditional Lifestyles for Healthy Communities in 2009.

== Musical career ==
Huit has traveled widely to perform, "in Canada, Italy, Switzerland, Austria, England, Belgium, Germany, Moscow, and the Philippines." Some of her CDs are children's songs promoting peace.

Huit is known for giving her CDs away to others to sell. She says she "has a heart to help, not become famous;" nonetheless, she has been an opening act for Bob Hope and John Lee Hooker, and sung for more than one President.

For fifteen years, she has been a presenter in the "Native America Speaks" programs at Glacier National Park.

Her voice has been described as "expressive, with much variety."

== Discography ==
- Hinter uns die Berge
