= University of Montana School of Journalism =

Journalism school in Missoula, Montana, United States

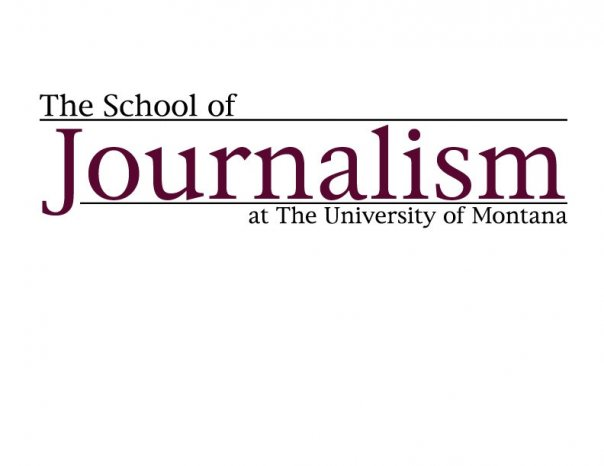
- Type: Public
- Established: 1914
- Dean: Larry Abramson
- Location: Missoula, Montana, USA; 46°51′41″N 113°59′05″W
- Campus: University of Montana
- Website: http://www.jour.umt.edu

The University of Montana School of Journalism is located at the University of Montana in Missoula, Montana, and is one of the oldest accredited journalism programs in the United States.

== History ==
Founded in 1914 with eight students, the school originally operated out of a number of army surplus tents on the university grounds, then moved to a bicycle shed before finally settling in a newly built wooden building. The next journalism building was completed in 1936. In June 2007, the journalism program relocated again to the newly constructed Don Anderson Hall.

== Studies ==
The j-school offers both undergraduate and graduate level studies in five main areas:

- print reporting and editing
- broadcast reporting and editing
- photojournalism
- Radio-TV production
- Master's in Environmental Science and Natural Resource Journalism

The program is accredited and is in partnership with the Accrediting Council on Education in Journalism and Mass Communications.

== Graduate Program ==
The University of Montana's Master's program in Environmental Science and Natural Resource Journalism was created in 2010. The program was announced less than a month after Columbia University, in New York City, suspended their Earth and Environmental Science Journalism dual master's degree program.

Accepting eight students a year who wish to specialize in reporting environmental issues, the Master's program invites applicants with undergraduate degrees in science and environmental studies, along with applicants with degrees or professional experience in journalism. Applications are only accepted for fall semester. The application deadline is February 15.

The two year interdisciplinary program requires course work in both journalism and hard sciences. The program trains graduate students to communicate environmental issues through various platforms such as print and photo stories, multimedia projects, and web and broadcast documentaries.

=== Curriculum ===
The program is based on a total of 36 credits. Graduate level journalism courses consist of 18 credits, while 12 credits must be earned in non-journalism graduate courses in environmental sciences.

The journalism graduate courses available to students range from skill focused classes like learning documentary photojournalism to covering and reporting on Native American issues across the Montana's seven reservations. An internship is also required for the degree, but the program challenges students to apply for intern positions at natural resource and environmental science organizations, like the United States Forest Service. The program's website explains how the "externship" works.

"The purpose of the externship is to "switch sides": Rather than working as reporters, editors or communications specialists, as they would during an internship, students work as firefighters, field technicians, farmhands, lab assistants or contract laborers. They shadow company executives and contribute to research, but they don't help develop publications or write press releases."

Graduate students are required to produce a professional project. The project is an in-depth story covering an environmental science or natural resource issue. The project may be one large, documentary style piece or a series of shorter thematically related stories. The topic is subjected to approval by the student's project committee.

== Features ==
The Montana Kaimin became a daily newspaper in 1938, allowing students to hone their journalism skills in a real-world environment.

Likewise, the campus radio station KBGA provides opportunities for students in broadcast journalism, and radio production programs.

== Notable alumni ==
The school and its students/alumni have achieved significant national in international success, including:

- Seven alumni who played major roles in winning Pulitzer Prizes.
- Three Rhodes Scholars
- The first woman to win an Ernie Pyle award.
- Two George Polk award winners.
- One recipient of a Freedom Forum Journalism Professor of the Year Award.

Notable alumni include:

- Ryan Divish
- A.B. Guthrie
- Dorothy M. Johnson
- Carroll O'Connor
- Clarence Streit
