= University of Montana College of Business =

Business school in Missoula, Montana, United States

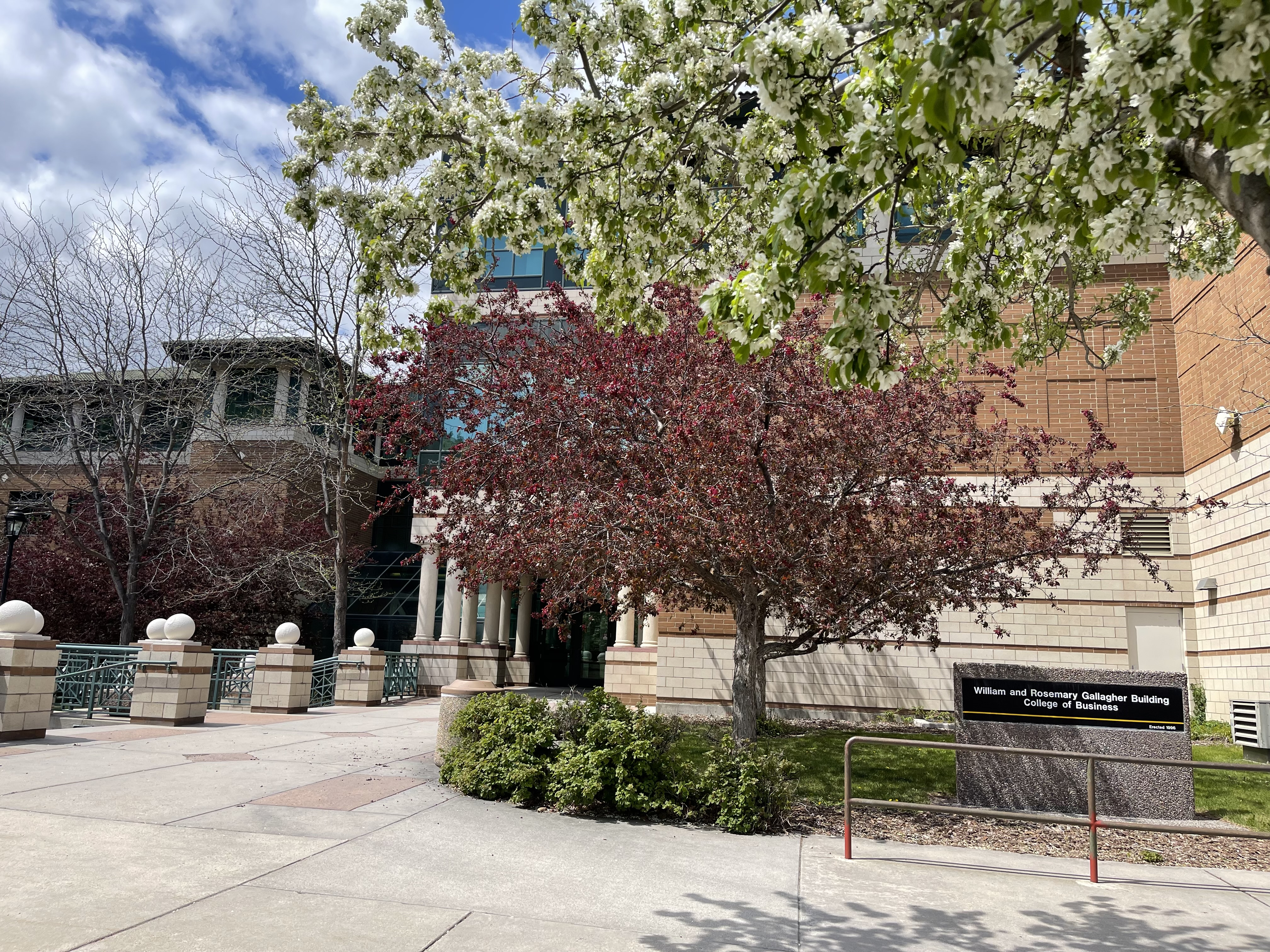
- Type: Public
- Established: 1918
- Dean: Suzanne Tilleman
- Location: Missoula, Montana, USA; 46°51′45″N 113°59′16″W
- Campus: University of Montana
- Website: http://www.business.umt.edu

Founded in 1918, the University of Montana College of Business is the oldest AACSB-accredited business school in Montana. The college tied for best business school in the Big Sky Conference in U.S. News & World Report's 2020 rankings. The UM College of Business has earned at least a share of the top spot in the Big Sky Conference for four consecutive years. This ranking made it the top-rated business school in Montana.

The College of Business focuses on applied, experiential education by having students participate in hands-on business projects. Specific attention is given to professional networking. Over one hundred business professionals come to the Gallagher Business Building each year to share their knowledge through formal lectures and to talk with and recruit students.

The college's Gianchetta Student Success Center offers an internship coordinator, adviser, career services, and other support structures to foster student success. Student organizations and study abroad opportunities in the college give students the chance to connect with peers and engage with the wider world in a variety of ways.

== Majors, minors and certificates ==
The college offers six majors: Accounting, Finance, International Business, Management, Management Information Systems, and Marketing. Any UM student can earn a minor in Business Administration. Current and non-current UM students can also earn a Business Certificate from the COB.

UM business students can earn certificates in Accounting Information Systems, Big Data Analytics, Digital Marketing, Entertainment Management, Entrepreneurship, or Sustainable Business Strategy.

The college offers three graduate degree programs: Master of Accountancy, Master of Business Administration, and Master of Business Analytics.

The University of Montana’s accounting programs are among the nation’s top-25 accounting schools. Drawing on peer assessment surveys from 1,000 accounting faculty at 200 U.S. colleges and universities, UM’s undergraduate accounting program landed at No.12 and the University’s graduate degree in accounting landed at No. 14 for institutions with less than 16 accounting faculty members.

In the western region, UM’s undergraduate accounting program was ranked No. 21 and the master’s program was ranked No. 20. The west region includes more than 200 undergraduate accounting programs and 130 accounting programs of all sizes in 15 western states.

== Partnerships ==
The College of Business maintains partnerships with the following affiliate centers located in the Gallagher Business Building.

- American Indian Business Leaders (AIBL)
- Bureau of Business and Economic Research (BBER)
- Montana World Trade Center
