= Ryan Divish =

American sportswriter

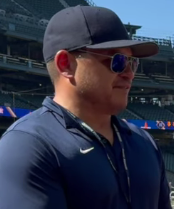
- Divish at T-Mobile Park in 2024
- Born: 1974 or 1975 (age 50–51)
- Occupation: Sportswriter
- Education: Havre High School; Dickinson State University; University of Montana
- Employer: The Seattle Times

Ryan Divish is an American sportswriter, blogger, media personality and the Seattle Mariners beat writer for The Seattle Times.

== Biography ==
Divish grew up in Havre, Montana and attended Havre High School. As a high schooler, he was inspired by an article by Gary Smith in Sports Illustrated to pursue a career in sportswriting and considered studying journalism at the University of Montana. However, he opted to attend the smaller Dickinson State University so that he could play college baseball. After graduating from Dickinson State with a degree in education and student teaching in Frenchtown, Montana, he decided to enroll in the UM School of Journalism.

He worked for The News Tribune from 2006 to 2013 where he covered the Seattle Mariners, University of Washington football, and the Tacoma Rainiers. He was one of the four members of the Seattle sports podcast, Karate Emergency, from October 2010 to July 2011, along with Alex Akita and Ashley Ryan. Divish also frequents as an on-air personality for KJR Sports Radio in Seattle. Since 2014, he has covered the Mariners for The Seattle Times.
