= Camas, Idaho =

Unincorporated community in Idaho, US

Coordinates: 44°00′27″N 112°13′16″W

Camas is an unincorporated community in Jefferson County, in the U.S. state of Idaho.

== History ==
A post office called Camas was established in 1884, and remained in operation until 1961. The community was named for the Camas root, a foodstuff cultivated by the Indians. A variant name was "Lava".

Camas' population was 75 in 1909, and was just 5 in 1960.
