= Judy Blunt =

American writer from Montana

- Born: Judy Blunt; October 10, 1954 (age 71); Phillips County, Montana, USA
- Education: University of Montana (M.F.A.)
- Occupation: University Professor Non-fiction Author
- Spouse: John Raymond Matovich
- Children: Three
- Relatives: Shirley Ann Aikins (Mother) Clarence Russell Blunt (Father)
- Writing career
- Pen name: Judy Matovich
- Genres: Memoir, Essay
- Notable awards: Whiting Award (2001) PEN/Jerard Fund Award for work in progress (1997)

Judy Blunt (born 10 October 1954) is an American writer from Montana. Her most notable work to date is Breaking Clean, a collection of linked essays exploring her rural upbringing.

== Biography ==
Blunt was raised on a cattle ranch in a remote area of Phillips County, Montana, near Regina, south of Malta, Montana. In 1986, she moved with her three small children to Missoula to attend the University of Montana.

She later turned the tales of her ranch life into her memoir, Breaking Clean (Knopf 2002), which won a Whiting Award, the PEN/Jerard Fund Award, Mountains and Plains Nonfiction Book Award, and Willa Cather Literary Award, and was one of The New York Times' Notable Books. She received a Jacob K. Javits Graduate Fellowship and a Montana Arts Council Individual Artist Fellowship. In 2004, she received a National Endowment for the Arts writer's fellowship, and in 2006 she was awarded a Guggenheim fellowship in Nonfiction. Her essays and poems have appeared in publications such as The New York Times, Big Sky Journal and Oprah Magazine. She also wrote the introduction for Joaquina Ballard Howles, No More Giants.

Blunt received her M.F.A. from the University of Montana in 1994. She currently resides in Missoula, where she is a retired Professor and director of Creative Writing at the University of Montana.

== Bibliography ==
- Breaking Clean, Knopf: 2002 (hardcover), ISBN 9780753198223
