= University of Montana =

Public university in Missoula, Montana, US

Coordinates: 46°51′36″N 113°59′07″W

- Former names: The University of Montana-Missoula (1893–1913) State University of Montana (1913–1935) Montana State University (1935–1965)
- Motto: Lux et Veritas (Latin)
- Motto in English: "Light and Truth"
- Type: Public research university
- Established: February 13, 1893; 133 years ago
- Parent institution: Montana University System - The University of Montana System
- Accreditation: NWCCU
- Academic affiliations: Space-grant
- Endowment: $320.7 million (2025)
- President: Jeremiah Shinn
- Provost: Adrea Lawrence
- Faculty: 559 full-time, 232 part-time
- Students: 11,064 (fall 2025)
- Undergraduates: 6,237 total (fall 2025)
- Location: Missoula, Montana, United States
- Campus: 220 acres (89 ha); Small city
- Newspaper: Montana Kaimin
- Colors: Maroon and silver
- Nickname: Grizzlies and Lady Griz
- Sporting affiliations: NCAA Division I FCS – Big Sky; USCSA
- Mascot: Monte
- Website: www.umt.edu

The University of Montana (UM) is a public research university in Missoula, Montana, United States. UM is a flagship institution of the Montana University System and its second largest campus. Fall 2024 saw total enrollment hit 10,811, marking the highest total enrollment for UM since 2018.

It is classified among "R1: Doctoral Universities – Very high research activity" as of 2022.

Alumni include 11 Truman Scholars, 14 Goldwater Scholars, and 40 Udall Scholars. One alumnus, Harold Urey, has won the Nobel Prize.

== History ==
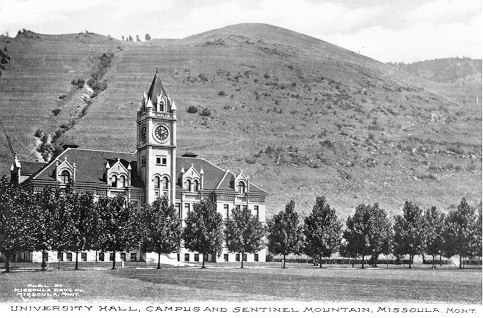
University (Main) Hall c. 1900

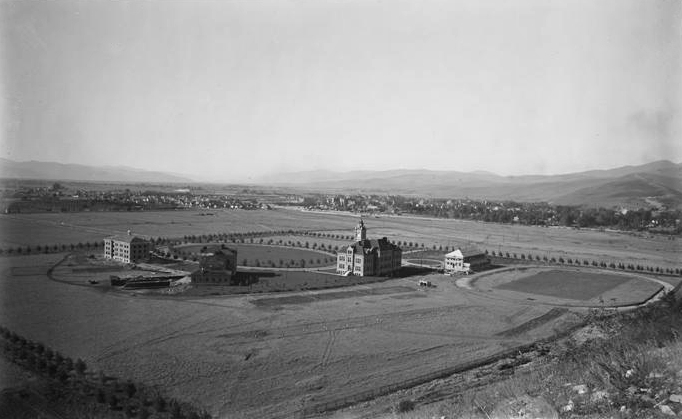
University of Montana c. 1900

An act of Congress of February 18, 1881, dedicated 72 sections (46,000 acres (72 mi^{2}; 190 km^{2})) in Montana Territory for the creation of the university.

Montana was admitted to the Union on November 8, 1889, and the state legislature soon began to consider where the state's permanent capital and state university would be located. To be sure that the new state university would be located in Missoula, the city's leaders made an agreement with the standing capital of Helena that Missoula would stay out of the bidding for the new capital and would support Helena over its leading competitor, Anaconda. The cities' bids were supported by the rival "Copper Kings", William A. Clark and Marcus Daly, respectively.

Missoula won the legislative vote for the new university at the Third Montana Legislative Assembly in February 1893, and it was formally opened in 1895. While plans for a university campus were progressing, classes were temporarily held at nearby Willard School. The South Missoula Land Company, owned by A.B. Hammond, Richard Eddy and Marcus Daly, joined with the Higgins family in donating land for the new campus. In June 1898 the cornerstone for A.J. Gibson designed University Hall was laid and Missoula became "the University City".

From 1945 until 1965, the name was changed by the legislature to "Montana State University", while the school in Bozeman was known as "Montana State College".

=== Presidents ===
Source:

== Academics ==
Academic rankings

National
- Forbes: 610
- U.S. News & World Report: 377 (tie)
- Washington Monthly: 154 (general) and 1 in Public Service
- WSJ/College Pulse: > 600

Global
- ARWU: 601-700
- QS: 801-1000
- U.S. News & World Report: 913 (tie)

The University of Montana comprises eleven full colleges and schools: College of Humanities & Sciences; Phyllis J. Washington College of Education and Human Sciences; W.A. Franke College of Forestry and Conservation; College of Health Professions and Biomedical Sciences; College of Visual and Performing Arts; Alexander Blewett III School of Law; UM College of Business; UM School of Journalism; UM School of Extended and Lifelong Learning; Missoula College and Bitterroot College.

The Phyllis J. Washington College of Education and Human Sciences is divided into five academic departments and the Institute of Educational Research and Service. In 1914, the University of Montana School of Law became a member of The Association of American Law Schools and in 1923, the school received accreditation from the American Bar Association. The W.A. Franke College of Forestry and Conservation offers five undergraduate majors (Ecosystem Science & Restoration; Forestry; Parks, Tourism & Recreation Management; Resource Conservation; and Wildlife Biology) and five Master's of Science and three PhDs.

=== Admissions ===
For the fall 2017 term, 6,182 students applied to the University of Montana. Ninety-three percent were accepted. The entering freshman class had an average high school GPA of 3.55, and the middle 50% range of SAT scores were 540-650 for reading and writing, 520-620 for math, while the ACT composite range was 21–26.

== Campus ==
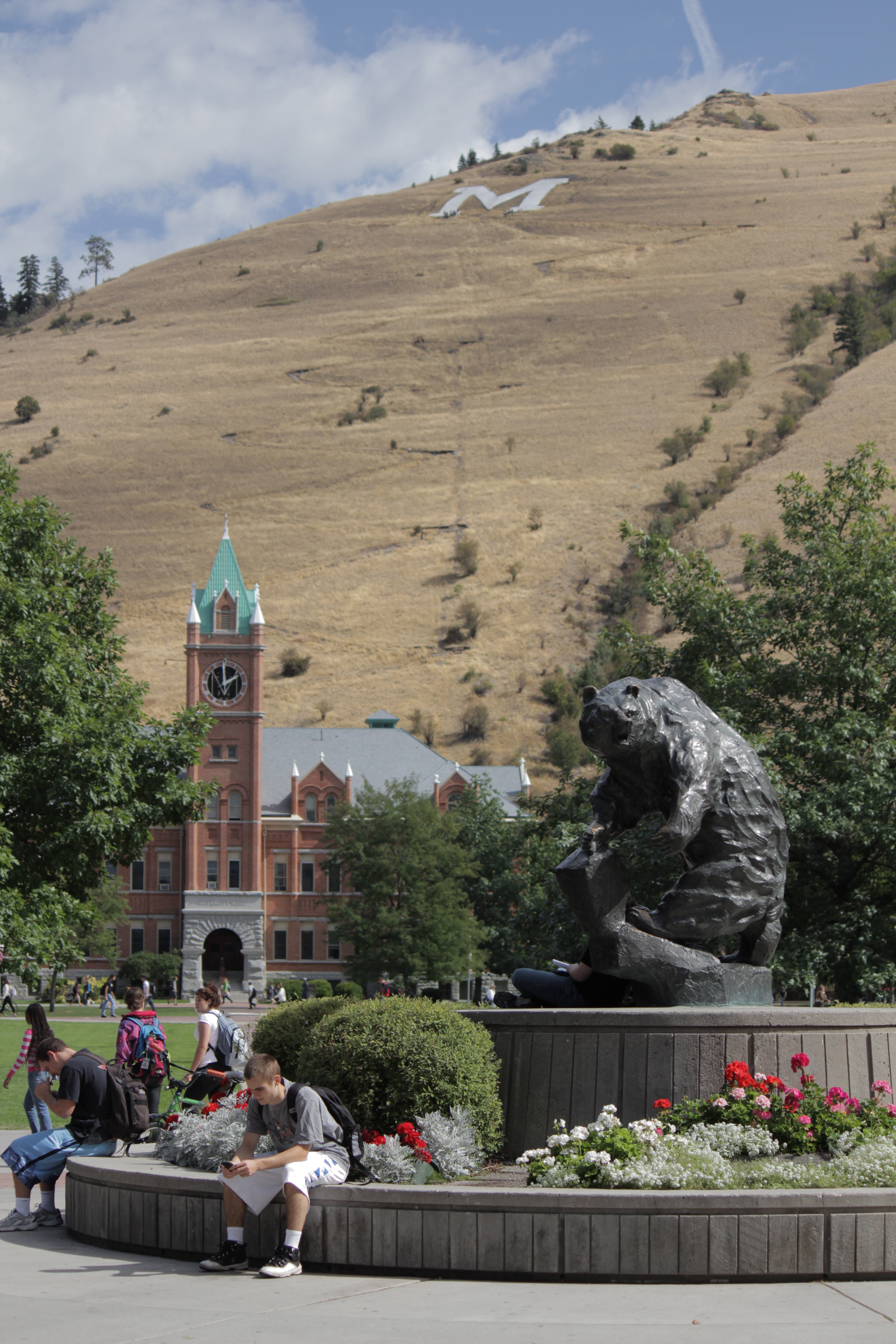
Symbols of the university

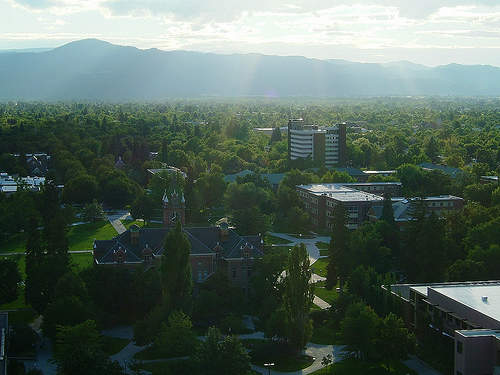
The UM campus

The original plan of the campus was designed by one of its first professors, Frederich Scheuch, who called for the central oval to be surrounded by university buildings. Although Scheuch's plan called for all building entrances to face the center of the Oval, forming a radiating building pattern, buildings were later constructed with three-story in the Renaissance Revival style, with hipped roofs and Spanish green roof tiles.

The first set of buildings were set up around the oval in 1895. Since that time, various campus plans and architectural styles have been used. Today the campus consists of 220 acres (89 ha) and is bordered to the east by Mount Sentinel and the north by the Clark Fork River. The main campus comprises 64 buildings, including nine residence halls and various athletic venues, including Washington–Grizzly Stadium, a 26,500-seat football stadium and the Adams Center (formerly, Dahlberg Arena), a 7,500-seat multi-purpose arena where the university's basketball teams play.

Landmarks include:

The Oval

A three-acre (1.2 ha) swath of grass running east to west, marking the traditional center of the university. Today it is divided into quadrants by two intersecting brick-laid paths. A double row of trees was planted around the oval on Arbor Day 1896, but many of the trees have since died and are in the process of being replanted. The original gravel driveway that once surrounded the Oval has also been replaced by sidewalk. The original master plan of the university called for all buildings to face the center of the oval, but this plan proved difficult and a new plan was created in 1935.

On the western extreme of the Oval is a life-sized grizzly bear statue created by ceramic artist and sculptor Rudy Autio in 1969. The bronze statue is 7 feet (2.1 m) in height, weighs 5,000 pounds (2,300 kg), and took a year to create. Many photographs of the university picture the bear with the Oval, university (Main) Hall, and Mount Sentinel's 'M' in the background.

The "M" trail

A 3/4-mile (1.2 km) trail with 13 switchbacks, it ascends 620 vertical feet (190 m), from 3,200 to 3,820 feet (975 to 1,165 m) above sea level, from the university at the base of Mount Sentinel. The trail offers sweeping views of the city below.

"The 'M'" first placed on Mount Sentinel was originally made of whitewashed rocks and only measuring 25 feet (7.6 m) by 25 feet; it was replaced by a wooden "M" in 1912, which cost $18. That "M," unlike today's "M," stood upright on the face of Mount Sentinel. A larger wooden version of the "M" was built in 1913 and upkeep of the structure was formally charged to each year's freshman class.

When the large wooden "M" was destroyed by a blizzard in 1915, an even larger version was constructed of whitewashed granite. Once again the freshman class was tasked with annual renovation of the symbol, beginning a new tradition. Each year from then on, University of Montana freshmen made the hike up to the "M" to apply a fresh coat of whitewash and remove any weeds and grass that had grown in and around the structure.

The annual tradition ended in 1968 when a 125-by-100-foot (38 by 30 m) concrete "M" was built at a cost of $4,328. Although the annual whitewashing went by the wayside, one tradition that lives on today is the lighting of the "M" during the university's annual Homecoming celebration each fall. Originally lit by a group of students on October 9, 1919, following the fall whitewashing, the event was so popular that students have continued to light the "M" each year during Homecoming week; special beacons light up the giant letter, welcoming former students back to the university.

Memorial Row

On the north side of campus, 29 evergreen trees stand in two columns forming Memorial Row along what used to be the path of Van Buren Avenue. The trees, running from the corner of the Oval to Eddy Avenue, were planted in 1919 following the end of the Great War to honor UM students, alumni, and faculty who died in the war, some to combat and many more to the influenza epidemic. The trees are Pinus ponderosa (Western Yellow Pines or Ponderosa Pine), the state tree of Montana. Originally, a white T-board stood in front of each tree, with the name of the person whom it honors; in 1925, these were replaced with 35 brass nameplates atop concrete markers. At the same time, the university added a memorial tablet on a boulder near the edge of the Oval closest to Memorial Row. It lists 21 of the 31 honorees from 1919. By 1925, the university had increased the number of names on the official list to 35, and sometime later, it grew to 37.

== Organization and administration ==
=== Administration ===
The University of Montana is the main campus for the university, which includes four other campuses. The public university system is one of two in Montana; the other is Montana State University. Both systems are governed as the Montana University System by the Montana Board of Regents, which consists of seven members appointed by the state governor, and confirmed by the state senate to serve overlapping terms of seven years, except for one student member who is appointed for one year at a time.. The governor and Superintendent of Public Instruction, both statewide elected officials, are ex officio members of the board, as is the Commissioner of Higher Education, who is appointed by the Board of Regents.

The Board of Regents appoints the university president, who is directly responsible and accountable to the Commissioner of Higher Education.

=== Funding ===
The total operating budget for the University of Montana for fiscal year 2017 was approximately $423 million. About $149 million comes from the General Funds budget, $108 million from restricted funds, auxiliary funds ($51 million), designated funds ($44 million), and plant funds ($61 million).

Over the past 30 years, state support for higher education has dropped dramatically. In 1990, the State of Montana provided for 69% of the educational and general funds budget. It now supports 33% of the general fund or 13% of the university's operating budget. This decrease in funding has, in part, been made up by the university competing for sponsored research money with a growth from $12 million in 1994 to $88 million in 2017 and salaries as low as 3/5 the national average.

=== Colleges, schools, and centers ===
The University of Montana comprises seven colleges and two professional schools:

- College of Humanities and Sciences (1893)
- Phyllis J. Washington College of Education and Human Sciences (2009)
- W.A. Franke College of Forestry and Conservation (1913)
- College of Health Professions and Biomedical Sciences
  - Skaggs School of Pharmacy (1907)
  - School of Physical Therapy and Rehabilitation Science
  - School of Social Work
  - School of Public and Community Health Sciences
- Missoula College (1956)
  - College of Technology
  - Bitterroot College (Hamilton, MT)
- College of the Arts and Media
  - School of Art
  - School of Theatre and Dance
  - School of Media Arts
  - School of Music (1893)
  - School of Journalism (1914)
- Davidson Honors College (1991)
- College of Business (1918)
- School of Law (1911)

The University of Montana is also home to a variety of projects, research centers, and institutes.

== Campus media ==
The Montana Kaimin, founded in 1898, is the student-run college newspaper. It is independent of the university. It attracted national attention in 2009, when football coach Bobby Hauck refused to take questions from the paper in retaliation for a story about an alleged assault by two Grizzly football players. The Montanan is the university's alumni magazine, published by the University Relations office. CutBank, founded in 1973 by the Creative Writing Program, is a literary magazine. Camas: The Nature of the West, is a literary journal run by graduate students of the Environmental Studies Program.

KBGA (89.9 FM) is the college radio station. KUFM-FM is the flagship and founding station of Montana Public Radio. Founded in 1965, its studios are located in the Broadcast Media Center, of the Performing Arts/Radio Television Center. KUFM-TV (Channel 11) is the local Montana PBS station.

== Student life ==
Undergraduate demographics as of Fall 2023
Race and ethnicity	Total
White	70%
Two or more races	15%
Hispanic	6%
American Indian/Alaska Native	3%
Unknown	2%
Asian	1%
Black	1%
International student	1%
Economic diversity
Low-income (Note: The percentage of students who received an income-based federal Pell grant intended for low-income students.)	30%
Affluent (Note: The percentage of students who are a part of the American middle class at the bare minimum.)	70%

A variety of student organizations exist on campus. Four fraternities and three sororities have chapters on campus.

The University of Montana's International Program began as the International Student club in 1924. In 1981, the Mansfield Center was established and certification in teaching of English as a second language (TESL) began. As of 2010, the university has partnerships established with over 90 universities in over 40 countries. The largest number of partnership are with universities in Japan (eight), China (seven), and Chile (seven).

Programs on Central and Southwest Asia were created in 1997. UM is currently the only American university offering a Bachelor of Arts in Central and Southwest Asian Studies. In September 2010, the Montana Board of Regents unanimously approved the creation of the Center for the Study of Central and Southwest Asia at the University of Montana.

== Athletics ==
Montana Grizzlies logo

The athletic teams are nicknamed the Montana Grizzlies ("Lady Griz" is used when referring to the women's basketball team; all other women's teams are known as the "Griz"). The university has competed in the NCAA's Big Sky Conference since the conference was formed in 1963. From 1924 to 1950, the University of Montana was a member of the Pacific Coast Conference (precursor to today's Pac-12). The University of Montana has an ongoing rivalry with Montana State University, most notably the cross-state football matchups, known as the "Brawl of the Wild", but also includes the cross-state club lacrosse matchup, known as the "Copper Cup".

Programs include:

- Montana Grizzlies football – Since the 1990s, the Griz have established themselves as one of the most dominant football teams in both the Big Sky Conference and in the NCAA Football Championship Subdivision (known as Division I-AA football before 2006). They won the I-AA national title in 1995 and 2001.
- Montana Grizzlies men's basketball – The men's basketball team has established itself in recent years as a power in the Big Sky, and was the conference representative to the NCAA Division I Men's basketball tournament in 2005, 2006, 2010, 2012, 2013, 2018, and 2019. At the 2006 tournament, the 12th-seeded Griz upset fifth-seeded University of Nevada, Reno, 87–79, the school's first win in the tournament in 31 years. The Cinderella run ended against the fourth-seeded Boston College Eagles.
- Montana Grizzlies women's basketball – The Lady Griz have won 17 conference titles in 25 years, most recently in 2012, and have competed in the NCAA Women's tournament 17 times. The Lady Griz were coached from 1978 to 2016 by Robin Selvig (Montana, 1974), who had an overall record of 865–286 (.752 winning percentage). Selvig earned his 600th win in just 772 games, the sixth fastest of any NCAA coach (men or women). Selvig finished his career ranked eighth among all women's basketball coaches in victories with 865. Since 2016, the team is coached by former Lady Griz star Shannon Schweyen.

Other intercollegiate sports include men's and women's cross country, women's golf, men's and women's track and field, men's and women's indoor track and field, men's and women's tennis, women's volleyball and women's soccer. In 2015 UM added women's softball.

Intramural sports include men's lacrosse (won 2007 national championship in their division, MCLA-B) and women's lacrosse, the Alpine Ski Team (went to the national championships in winter 2006), rowing, dance and cheer, men's and women's ice hockey, men's soccer, the Woodsman Team, rodeo, the Missoula Footbag Alliance. triathlon, cycling, fencing, Jesters Rugby, and Betterside Women's Rugby.

The mascot of the university is Monte, a grizzly bear. In 1897, a live bear cub traveled with UM's football team, then known as the "Bears" (the "Grizzlies" name was adopted in 1923). Numerous live bear cubs who served as university mascots, first named "Teddy", then "Fessy" and finally, in the 1960s, "Cocoa". UM's costumed mascot during the 1980s, dubbed "Otto", donned a variety of fun-loving outfits to entertain crowds at Grizzly football games. Monte (short for "Montana") was born in the mountains of Missoula in the fall 1993. The 2002–03 and 2004–05 National Champion Mascot of the Year (Capital One/ESPN) has evolved into a "motorcycle-riding, break-dancing, back flipping, slam-dunking, movie-making, crowd-surfing, goal post smashing, prank-pulling superstar."

== Notable people ==
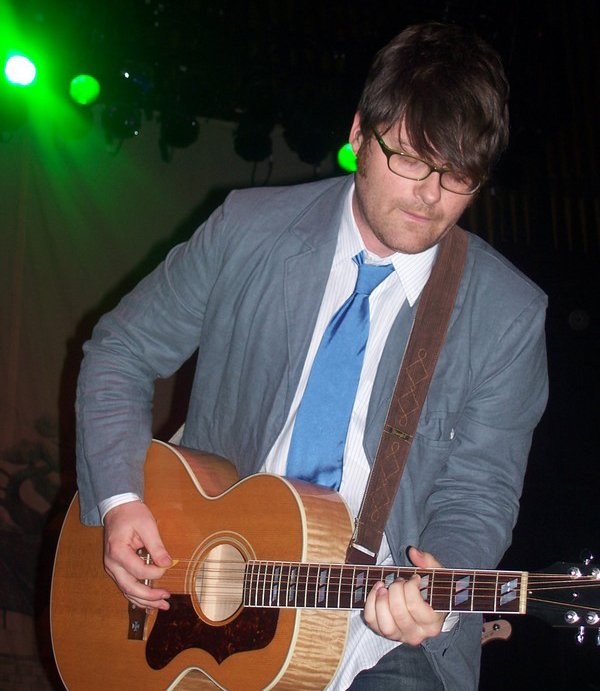
Colin Meloy
Musician and frontman
of The Decemberists

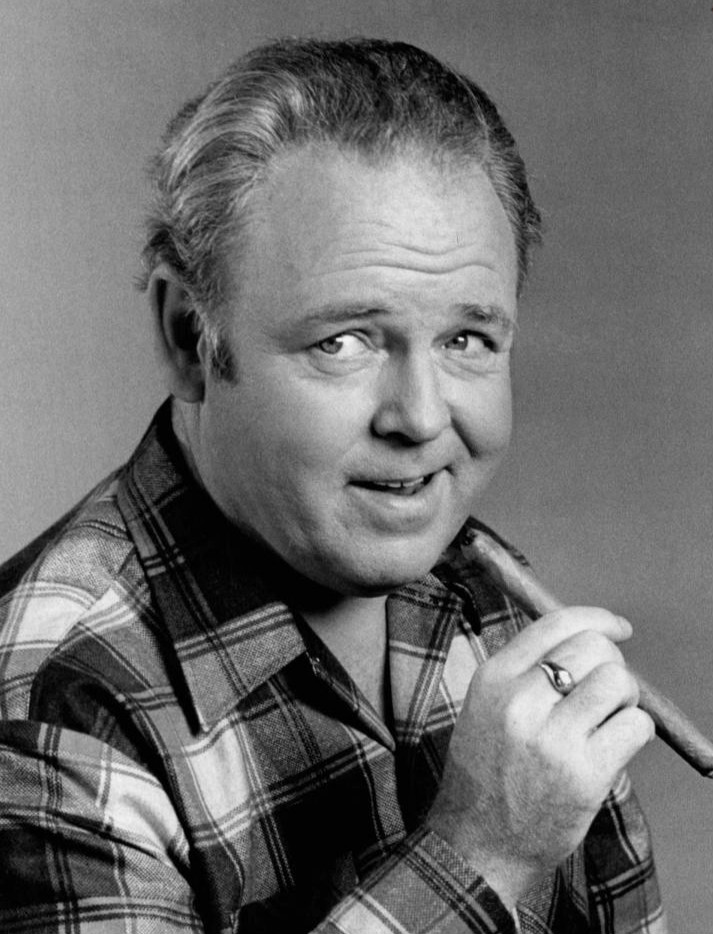
Carroll O'Connor
Actor

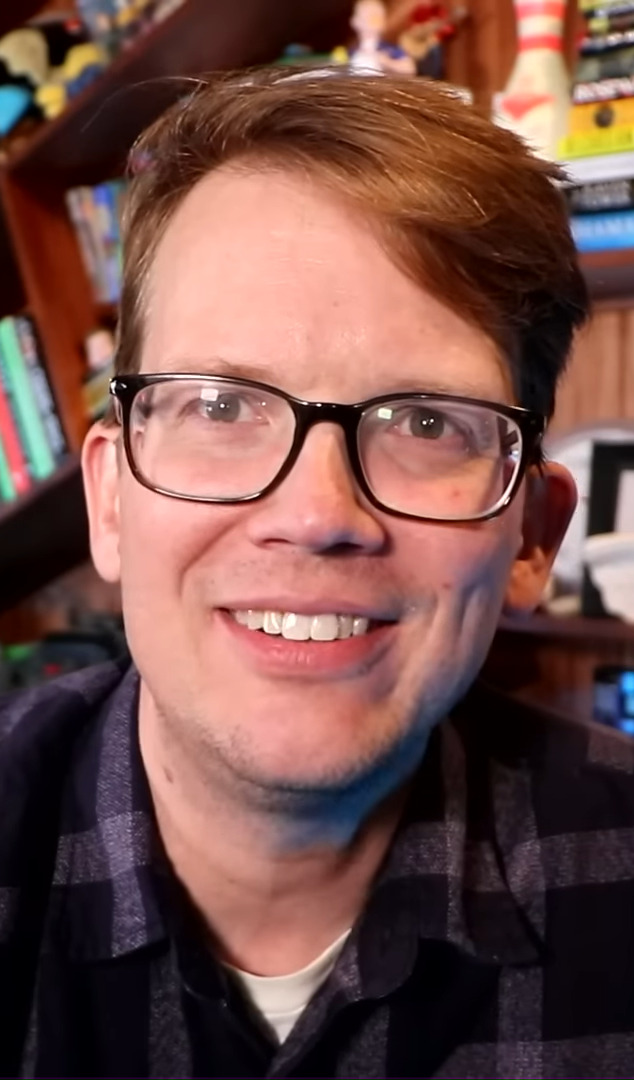
Hank Green
Vlogger and science communicator

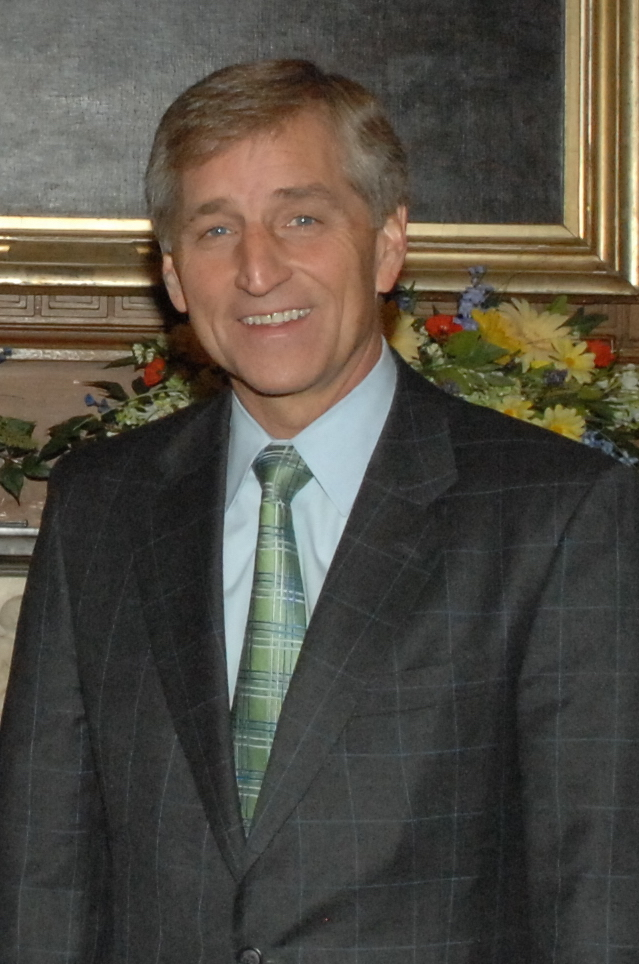
Marc Racicot
21st governor of Montana

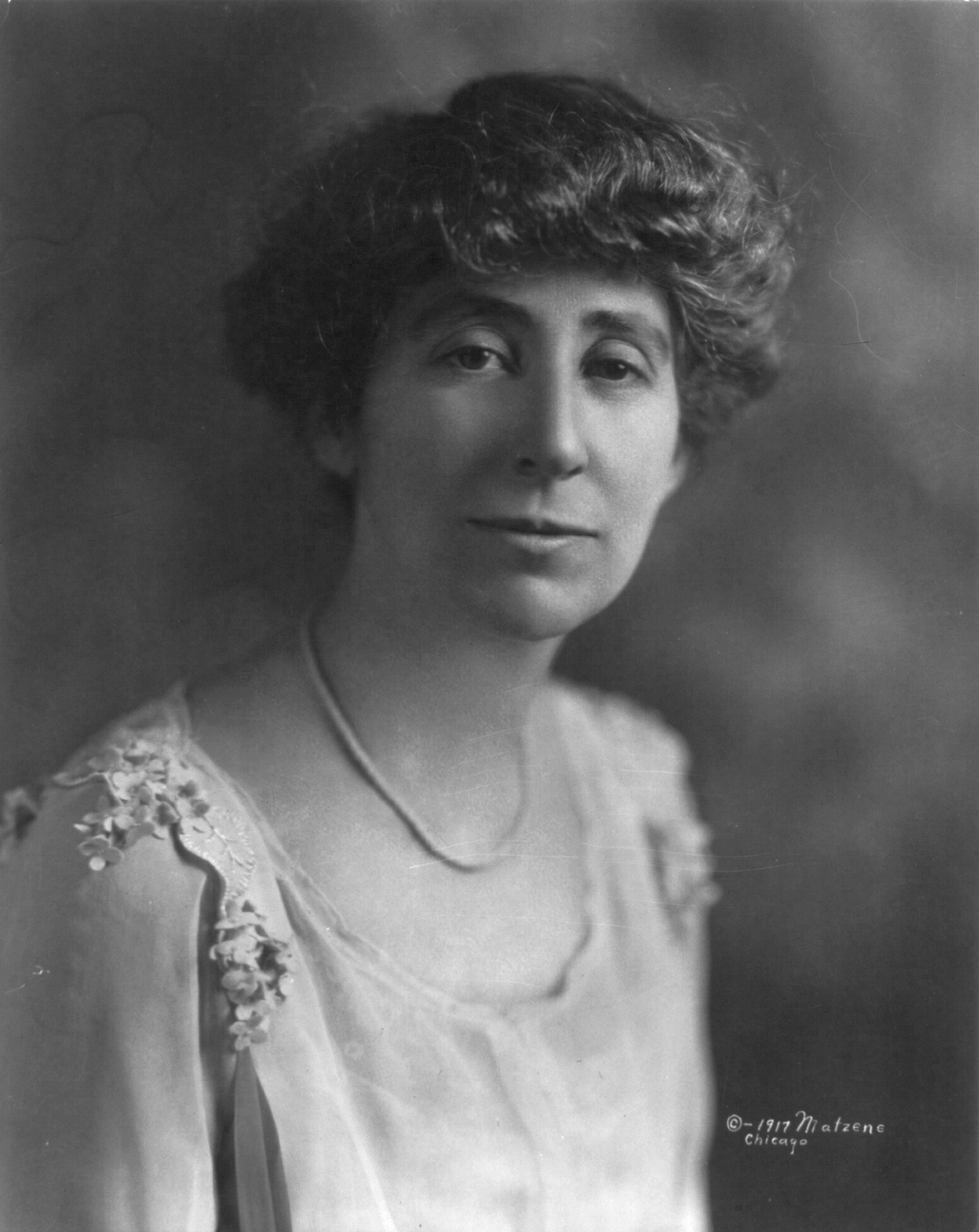
Jeannette Rankin
First woman elected to U.S. House of Representatives

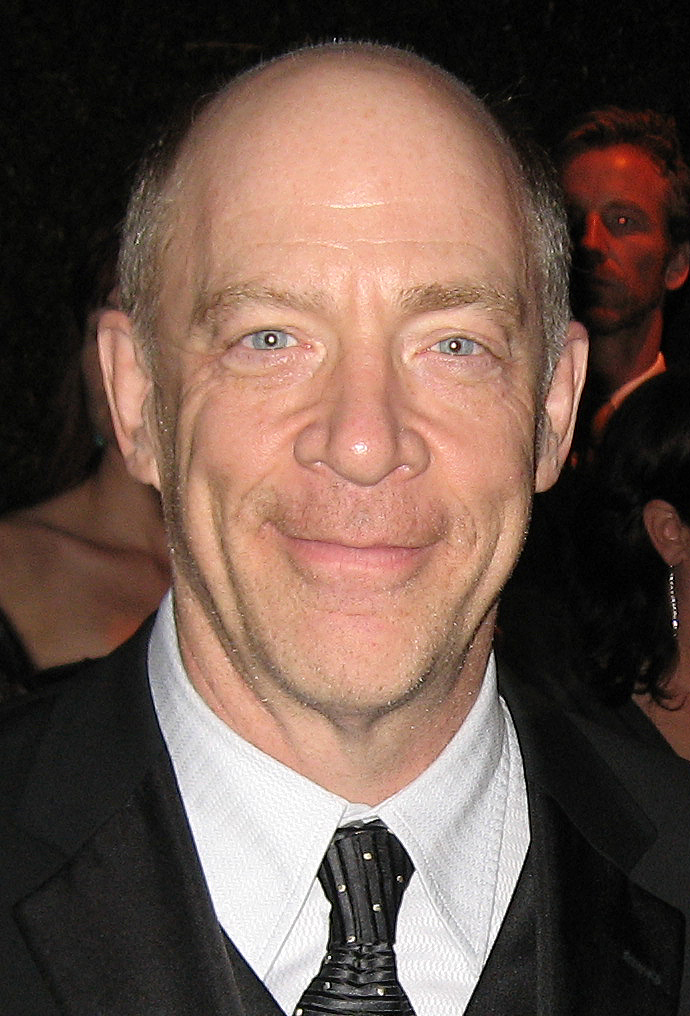
J. K. Simmons
Actor

=== Athletes ===
- Raul Allegre, football player; New York Giants placekicker
- Colt Anderson, football player; Buffalo Bills safety
- Josh Barnett, former UFC Heavyweight Champion, mixed martial artist
- Doug Betters, football player; Miami Dolphins defensive end
- Kroy Biermann, football player; Buffalo Bills defensive end
- Guy Bingham, football player; New York Jets center
- Dan Carpenter, football player; Buffalo Bills placekicker
- Dylan Cook, football player; Pittsburgh Steelers offensive tackle
- Scott Curry, football player; Green Bay Packers offensive lineman
- Barry Darrow, football player; Cleveland Browns offensive tackle
- Keron DeShields (born 1992), basketball player in the Israeli National League
- Dave Dickenson, Canadian football player; BC Lions and Calgary Stampeders quarterback, CFL MVP (2000) and Grey Cup MVP (2006)
- Terry Dillon, football player; Minnesota Vikings defensive back
- Aldo Forte, football player; Chicago Bears offensive tackle
- Scott Gragg, football player; New York Giants offensive tackle
- Tim Hauck, football player; Green Bay Packers safety
- Lex Hilliard, football player; Miami Dolphins running back
- Trumaine Johnson, football player; Los Angeles Rams cornerback
- Larry Krystkowiak, former NBA player and coach, currently head coach University of Utah
- Mike Lazetich, football player; Los Angeles Rams offensive guard
- Dustin Lind, director of hitting and assistant hitting coach for the San Francisco Giants
- Marc Mariani, football player; Tennessee Titans wide receiver, 2011 Pro Bowl selection as return specialist
- Marty Mornhinweg, played football at Montana before becoming coach in NFL; formerly Baltimore Ravens offensive coordinator
- Dallas Neil, football player; Atlanta Falcons special teams
- Joirdon Nicholas, basketball forward/center; Maccabi Ashdod in the Israeli Basketball Premier League
- Milt Popovich, football player; Chicago Cardinals halfback
- Cory Procter, football player; Miami Dolphins guard/center
- Chase Reynolds, football player; St. Louis Rams running back
- Micheal Ray Richardson, NBA player; played for New York Knicks and New Jersey Nets
- Brian Salonen, football player; Dallas Cowboys tight end
- Shann Schillinger, football player; Atlanta Falcons safety
- Kirk Scrafford, football player; Cincinnati Bengals offensive lineman
- Robin Selvig, basketball player and head coach of Montana Lady Griz
- Mickey Sutton, football player; Los Angeles Rams cornerback
- Mike Tilleman, football player; New Orleans Saints defensive tackle
- Wayne Tinkle, former professional basketball player and head coach for university's men's basketball team; most recently head coach for Oregon State
- Trevor Utter, football player, head coach of Simpson Red Hawks football
- Jacob Wiley, basketball player; Israeli Basketball Premier League power forward / center

=== Entertainment and the arts ===
- Jeff Ament, musician
- Eric Braeden, film and television actor
- Miguel del Águila, composer pianist
- Ted Geoghegan, screenwriter and director, best known for the 2015 horror film We Are Still Here
- Susan Gibson, singer and songwriter, wrote the Chicks' "Wide Open Spaces" while at UM
- Lily Gladstone, actress
- Gen Huit, Salish-Pend Oreille singer-songwriter
- Mary Kirkwood, artist
- Beth Lo, artist
- Sahir Lodhi, film and television actor, radio show host in Pakistan
- Colin Meloy, singer and songwriter
- George Montgomery, film and television actor
- Carroll O'Connor, film and television actor
- Lee Powell, actor
- Rob Quist, singer and musician
- J. K. Simmons, actor
- Steven Rinella, outdoorsman
- Reagan Wilson, actress and Playboy model

=== Law, politics, and government ===
- Forrest H. Anderson, 17th governor of Montana
- Gordon Belcourt, former executive director of Montana-Wyoming Tribal Leaders Council
- Edward Butcher, state legislator
- Jerry Daniels, CIA agent in Laos during Vietnam War
- Charles E. "Chip" Erdmann, circuit judge of United States Court of Appeals for the Armed Forces, former associate justice of Montana Supreme Court
- Mike Mansfield, U.S. representative (1943–1953); U.S. senator (1953–1977); Senate majority leader (1961–1977); U.S. ambassador to Japan (1977–1978); received both B.A. (1933) and M.A. degrees (1934) from university and taught Latin American and Far Eastern History before beginning political career, remained tenured professor until his death; UM library named in his honor
- Jim Messina, political staffer, White House deputy chief of staff for President Barack Obama 2009–2011
- John Milkovich, member of Louisiana State Senate, reared in Roundup, Montana
- Lee Minto, healthcare and women's rights activist and former executive director of Seattle-King County Planned Parenthood
- Jeannette Rankin, first woman elected to US Congress, elected from Montana
- Ted Schwinden, 23rd lieutenant governor of Montana and 19th governor of Montana
- Garry South, strategist and commentator, ASUM president (1973–74), national Campaign Manager of the Year (1998), UM Distinguished Alumni Award (2008)
- Sidney Runyan Thomas, graduate of School of Law, federal judge on United States Court of Appeals for the Ninth Circuit
- Gail D. Zimmerman, Wyoming state legislator

=== Journalism ===
- Hank Green, half of YouTube channel VlogBrothers; creator of educational YouTube channels Crash Course and SciShow; co-founder of DFTBA Records
- Vernon Arnold Haugland, author, AP WWII and NASA reporter, first civilian recipient of the Silver Star
- Meg Oliver, anchor of the CBS overnight news program Up to the Minute
- Jennifer Servo, broadcast journalist
- Molly Wood, executive editor for CNET, host of podcast Buzz Out Loud

=== Science and academia ===
- David Alt, geology professor and writer
- Mark Angelo, founder of World Rivers Day
- Jessie M. Bierman, public health physician and academic
- Stewart M. Brandborg, conservationist
- Ragan Callaway, Regent's Professor of Ecology, expert in ecological facilitation and invasive species research
- Carla Dove, ornithologist and leading expert of bird-aircraft strikes
- Helen M. Duncan, geologist and paleontologist
- R. Thomas Flynn, college administrator who has worked at Rutgers University, Ocean Community College and Monroe Community College
- Reynold C. Fuson, chemist
- Emily Graslie, host of YouTube channel The Brain Scoop and first ever Chief Curiosity Correspondent at Chicago's Field Museum of Natural History
- John P. Grotzinger, geology professor
- Merilyn Manley-Harris, carbohydrate chemist
- Lisa Parks, media scholar
- Stanley R. Riggs, coastal geologist
- Raymond R. Rogers, geology professor
- Steve Running, Regent's Professor of Ecology, expert in global ecosystem monitoring, member of Intergovernmental Panel on Climate Change
- Harold Urey, physical chemist, won Nobel Prize in Chemistry in 1934 for work on isotopes; Harold C. Urey Lecture Hall at university named in his honor
- James B. Yule, pioneer of aerial photography and photogrammetry for the United States Forest Service

=== Writers ===
- Judy Blunt, writer of Breaking Clean, currently associate professor at UM
- Allie Brosh, blogger, webcomic artist, author; author/illustrator of Hyperbole and a Half
- Eduardo Chirinos, Peruvian poet, associate professor at UM
- Anthony Cronin, Irish writer and poet, visiting lecturer 1966–1968
- Rick DeMarinis, novelist and short story writer who taught at UM
- William Finnegan, winner of the 2016 Pulitzer Prize in Biography/Autobiography for his 2015 memoir Barbarian Days, A Surfing Life
- Dan Flores, historian of the American West, professor emeritus of UM
- Andrew Sean Greer, winner of the 2018 Pulitzer Prize in Fiction for his novel Less
- A.B. Guthrie Jr., Pulitzer Prize–winning author, screenwriter, historian
- Shannon Hale, young adult fantasy and adult fiction author
- Richard Hugo, poet and professor whose work reflected economic depression in Northwest
- Joanna Klink, poet
- J. Robert Lennon, writer
- Deirdre McNamer, writer
- Martin V. Melosi, writer of The Sanitary City and historian
- Ed Skoog, writer and poet
- James Welch, author

== See also ==
- List of forestry universities and colleges
- University of Montana Grizzly Marching Band
