= Jonathan Dally =

American football player

Profile
- Position: Quarterback

Personal information
- Listed height: 6 ft 1 in (1.85 m)
- Listed weight: 180 lb (82 kg)

Career information
- High school: Ernest Righetti (CA)
- College: Cal Poly
- NFL draft: 2009: undrafted

Career history
- Rhinos Milano (2011); Danube Dragons (2012–2013); Milano Seamen (2014–2015)

Jonathan Dally is a former professional American football quarterback. A dual-threat, Dally played college football at Cal Poly and later was the co-MVP for both the 2014 and 2015 Italian bowl championship games in the Italian Football League (IFL). Dally also played in the Austrian Football League (AFL).

== Early life ==
Dally played high school football at Ernest Righetti High in Santa Maria, California. He earned All-Pac 5 League honors as a junior and senior quarterback, while also playing defensive back for the Warriors.

== Collegiate career ==
Standing 6-foot-1 and 180 pounds, Dally played his first two college seasons at Allan Hancock College in Santa Maria, before signing a National Letter of Intent in December 2006 to transfer to Cal Poly University, an FCS program in San Luis Obispo, California. As a sophomore, he was selected to the All-Western State Conference Team and earned AHC's Team MVP award.

Despite playing only two seasons at Cal Poly, Dally's combined 75 passing and rushing touchdowns totaled a school career record, which would later be matched by Chris Brown. In a 2007 game against Weber State, Dally set a program record for touchdown passes in a game, with six, and tied the single-game record in 2008 versus Southern Utah. In 2008, his passer-efficiency rating of 171.6 led the country at the FCS level. Following the 2008 regular season, Dally was selected to the All-Great West Conference First Team and received two write-in votes for seven total points in the balloting for the Walter Payton Award.

=== Statistics ===
College statistics
School	Season	GP	Comp.	Att.	Comp. %	Passing Yards	Long	TD	INT	Rush. Att.	Rushing Yards	Avg.	Long	Rush. TD
Allan Hancock (Fr.)	2005	n/a	78	140	55.7	1,179	n/a	11	n/a	n/a	n/a	n/a	n/a	n/a
Allan Hancock (So.)	2006	n/a	71	122	58.2	1,050	n/a	13	n/a	n/a	310	n/a	n/a	7
Cal Poly (Jr.)	2007	11	104	192	54.2	2,238	85	29	5	182	763	4.2	39	12
Cal Poly (Sr.)	2008	11	116	202	57.4	1,960	67	23	5	152	821	5.4	29	11
Totals		n/a	369	656	56.3	6,427	n/a	76	n/a	n/a	n/a	n/a	n/a	n/a

== Professional career ==
In 2011, Dally started his pro career playing for the Milano Rhinos in the Italian Football League.

For the 2012-2013 seasons, Dally signed with the Danube Dragons of the Austrian Football League in February 2012, and played with the club through 2013. The Dragons reached the Austrian league playoffs in both seasons.

In 2014 Dally returned to the Italian Football League, signing with the Milano Seamen, Dally was selected as co-MVP of the 2014 Italian Bowl. He also quarterbacked Milano to a repeat title in 2015, again earning the co-MVP honor as the Seamen defeated the Parma Panthers 24–14 in the XXXV edition of the game, held at Stadio Vigorelli.

As the Seamen finished 11–1 in 2014, Dally surpassed 30 touchdown passes and added six rushing touchdowns for the season.
