= Lazio Ducks =

American football team

Lazio Marines

General information
- Founded: 2000
- Stadium: Campo Sportivo P. Tintisona, Paliano (FR)
- Headquartered: Rome
- Colors: Sky Blue, White
- Website: https://www.laziofootball.com/ducks/

Personnel
- Head coach: Sergio Scoppetta

League / conference affiliations
- Italian Football League

Current uniform
Home

Away

The Lazio Marines established in 2000, are an American football team that plays in Italian Football League. The Marines are located in Rome the capital of Lazio region. The Lazio football was founded in 1991, under the name of Marines Ostia, by the current president Fabio Pacelli. On October 31, 2021, the Ducks won the IFAF Winter Championship.

== Season-by-season records ==
Year	Team name	Record	Postseason
2000	Ostia Marines	4–5	L, 0–40, Bergamo Lions in First Round
2001	Ostia Marines	9–0	L, 20–35, Bergamo Lions in Second Round
2002	Ostia Marines	3–4	L, 24–42, Ancona Dolphins in Second Round
2003	Ostia Marines	3–4	L, 17–31, Ancona Dolphins in Semi-Finals
2004	Lazio Mariners	4–4	L, 15–34, Bergamo Lions in Second Round
2005	Lazio Mariners	5–3	L, 13–23, Ancona Dolphins in First Round
2006	Lazio Mariners	1–7	Did not qualify
2007	Lazio Mariners	6–1	L, 14–17, Parma Panthers in Second Round
2008	Lazio Mariners	8–0	L, 39–40, Reggio Emilia Hogs in Second Round
2009	Lazio Mariners	6–2	L, 21–35, Bolzano Giants in Finals
2010	Lazio Mariners	3–5	Did not qualify
2011	Lazio Mariners	2–7	Did not qualify
2012	Lazio Mariners	1–10	Did not qualify
2013	Lazio Mariners	2–6	Did not qualify
2014	Lazio Mariners	1–9	Did not qualify
2015	Lazio Mariners	9–1	L, 20–40, Rhinos Milano in Semi-Finals
2016	Lazio Mariners	7–3	L, 0–27, Milano Seamen in First Round
2017	Lazio Mariners	3–7	Did not qualify
2018	Lazio Ducks	5–5	L, 13–45, Milano Seamen in Semi-Finals
2019	Lazio Ducks	5–3	L, 0–38, Milano Seamen in Semi-Finals
2020	Season cancelled due to COVID-19 pandemic		
2021	Lazio Ducks	4–4	L, 0–8, Milano Seamen in Semi-Finals
2022	Lazio Ducks	3–5	Did not qualify
2023	Lazio Ducks	3–5	L, 18–41, Ancona Dolphins in Wild Card
2024	Lazio Mariners	3–5	L, 26–31, Ancona Dolphins in Wild Card
2025	Lazio Mariners	2–5	Did not qualify
2026	Lazio Mariners	3–5	Did not qualify

== Former names ==
Source.

- Ostia Marines 2000–2003
- Lazio Ducks 2018–2023
- Lazio Mariners 2004–2017, 2024–present
