= Jordan Bouah =

Italian-American football player (born 1995)

No. 4 – Milano Rhinos
- Position: Wide receiver
- Roster status: active

Personal information
- Born: May 17, 1995 (age 31); Rome, Italy
- Listed height: 5 ft 9 in (1.75 m)
- Listed weight: 195 lb (88 kg)

Career information
- High school: Pablo Neruda (Italy)
- College: Saddleback (Mission Viejo, California)
- CFL draft: 2019 Euro: 1st round, 8th overall pick

Career history
- Ottawa Redblacks (2019)*; Giants Bolzano (2019); Dresden Monarchs (2019); Seamen Milano (2020–2021); Vienna Vikings (2022-2024); Milano Rhinos (2025-present)
- * Offseason or practice squad member only

Awards and highlights
- ELF champion (2022); Second-team All-ELF (2022)

Jordan Bouah
Medal record

Men's American football

Representing Italy

European Championship
Gold medal – first place	2021 Europe	Team

Jordan Bouah (born May 17, 1995) is an Italian gridiron football wide receiver for the Milano Rhinos of the Italian Football League. Born in Rome, he was drafted in the first round of the 2019 CFL European Draft by the Ottawa Redblacks. He played College football for the Saddleback Bobcats.

== Early life ==
Bouah was born in Rome to an Ivorian father and a Sardinian mother. After playing basketball throughout his childhood, he became interested in American football after watching the Super Bowl in 2015.

== College career ==
Bouah joined the Rome Gladiators before attending Saddleback College in California for two years. Before and during this time, he also played for the Italy national American football team, winning the European Championship in 2021.

== Professional career ==
Pre-draft measurables
Height	Weight	40-yard dash	20-yard shuttle	Three-cone drill	Vertical jump	Broad jump	Bench press
5 ft 9 1/2 in (1.77 m)	197 lb (89 kg)	4.68 s	4.72 s	7.88 s	33.0 in (0.84 m)	9 ft 10 1/2 in (3.01 m)	6 reps
All values from CFL Combine

=== Ottawa Redblacks ===
Bouah was selected by the Ottawa Redblacks of the Canadian Football League (CFL) with the 8th overall pick of the 2019 CFL European Draft. He was released after playing in just one preseason game. He remained on the practice squad.

=== Dresden Monarchs ===
Bouah then played for the Dresden Monarchs in the German Football League in the 2019 season. In the final six games of the season, he had 10 receptions for 145 yards and three touchdowns while also returning kicks.

=== Seamen Milano ===
In 2020 and 2021, Bouah played for the Seamen Milano in the Italian Football League. He helped the Seamen reach the 2021 league championship game losing in overtime to the Parma Panthers. In 2021 eight regular season games, Bouah had 29 receptions for 527 yards, nine touchdowns and rushed for 29 yards and one touchdown.

=== Vienna Vikings ===
On February 5, 2022, the Vienna Vikings announced the signing as an E-Import player for the 2022 European League of Football season.
