= Brock Olivo =

American football player and coach (born 1976)

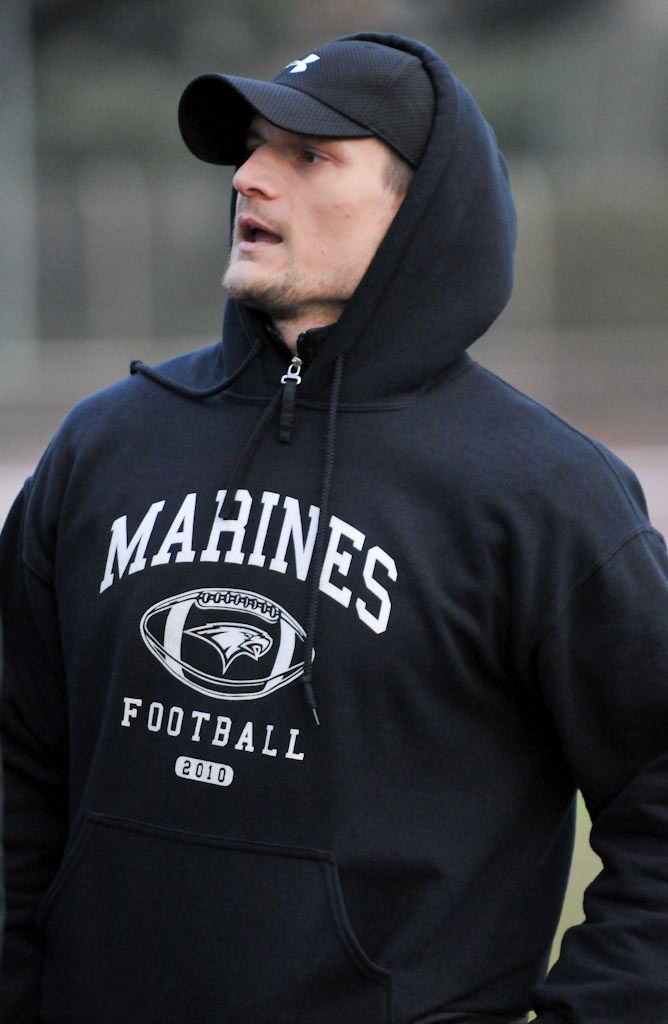
- Olivo in Italy in 2011

Miami Dolphins
- Title: Assistant special teams coach

Personal information
- Born: June 24, 1976 (age 50); St. Louis, Missouri, U.S.
- Listed height: 6 ft 0 in (1.83 m)
- Listed weight: 232 lb (105 kg)

Career information
- High school: St. Francis Borgia (Washington, Missouri)
- College: Missouri (1994–1997)
- NFL draft: 1998: undrafted

Career history

Playing
- San Francisco 49ers (1998)*; Detroit Lions (1998–2002); Lazio Ducks (2003–2004)
- * Offseason or practice squad member only

Coaching
- Bologna Warriors (2007–2009) Offensive & special teams coordinator; Lazio Marines (2009–2011) Head coach; Italy (2010–2011) Head coach; Omaha Nighthawks (2011) Running backs coach; Coastal Carolina (2012–2013) Running backs coach & special teams assistant; Kansas City Chiefs (2014–2016) Assistant special teams coordinator; Denver Broncos (2017) Special teams coordinator; Chicago Bears (2018–2019) Assistant special teams coordinator; Italy (2021) Assistant coach; Philadelphia Stars (2022) Running backs coach; Washington University (2022) Tight ends coach; Missouri (2023–2025) Special teams analyst; Miami Dolphins (2026–present) Assistant special teams coach

Awards and highlights
- As a player: NCAA Special Teams Player of the Year (1997); Second-team All-Big 12 (1997); Missouri Tigers No. 27 retired

Career NFL statistics
- Rushing yards: 7
- Rushing average: 3.5
- Receptions: 7
- Receiving yards: 74
- Stats at Pro Football Reference

James Brockman Olivo (o-LEEV-o; born June 24, 1976) is an American football coach and former player who currently serves as an assistant special teams coach for the Miami Dolphins of the National Football League (NFL). Prior to his current job, he was the tight ends coach for the Washington University Bears and the running backs coach for the Philadelphia Stars of the United States Football League (USFL). Previously, he played as a running back for the Detroit Lions of the NFL for four seasons. He then played two seasons in the Italian Football League (IFL).

== Early life ==
Born in St. Louis, and raised in Hermann, Missouri, Olivo attended St. Francis Borgia Regional High School in Washington, Missouri, where he rushed for 5,030 yards and 70 touchdowns during his high school career. He led Borgia to an undefeated season and Missouri state championship in 1993, as well as being named the Gatorade "Player of the Year" in the state of Missouri.

== Education and college career ==
Olivo attended the University of Missouri where he earned a degree in English literature. As a member of the football team, Olivo was the first awardee of the Mosi Tatupu Award for the top special teams player in college football. He left as the University of Missouri's career rushing and touchdown leader, but both records have since been broken (twice as of 2008). He was the seventh player in school history to have his jersey retired. He was also tapped into the Mystical Seven secret honor society during his tenure at Mizzou.

== Professional career ==
Pre-draft measurables
Height	Weight	Arm length	Hand span	40-yard dash	10-yard split	20-yard split	20-yard shuttle	Vertical jump	Broad jump	Bench press
6 ft 0 1/8 in (1.83 m)	217 lb (98 kg)	31 1/8 in (0.79 m)	10 1/2 in (0.27 m)	4.82 s	1.64 s	2.77 s	4.00 s	30.5 in (0.77 m)	9 ft 1 in (2.77 m)	24 reps
All values from NFL Combine

Olivo went undrafted out of college, but he made the Detroit Lions roster with his tenacious play on their special teams units. Olivo played for four seasons on Detroit's league-leading special teams, where he led the team in tackles on special teams in two of his four seasons, as well as being a backup at running back and fullback.

After the NFL, from 2003 to 2004, Olivo played running back and was also a coach in Italy with the Lazio Ducks (Marines), a team in the top division Italian Football League of Italy's American professional football league. He helped the team to the semifinals game for the first time in the team's history.

== Coaching career ==
Olivo served as head coach and offensive coordinator of the Italy national American football team, and lived in Rome before returning to the United States. He was later the running backs coach and special teams assistant for the Omaha Nighthawks of the United Football League.

In 2012, Olivo was hired as an assistant coach, running backs coach, and special teams coach at Coastal Carolina University.

Following back-to-back Big South Conference Championships (2012–13) with Coastal Carolina, Olivo was hired by the Kansas City Chiefs to become their assistant special teams coach. On January 24, 2017, he was announced by the Denver Broncos as their special teams coordinator.

On January 19, 2018, Olivo was hired by the Chicago Bears as a special teams assistant, reuniting him with new head coach Matt Nagy, who was a colleague of Olivo's in Kansas City. He was fired on December 31, 2019.

Olivo returned to Rome in 2020 to join the Lazio Ducks (a merger of the Lazio Marines and the Roma Grizzlies) as their coach, but the season was cancelled due to the COVID-19 pandemic. Following a stint as assistant coach of the Italy national American football team, Olivo was hired as the running backs coach for the Philadelphia Stars of the United States Football League. Prior to the 2022 NCCA Division III season, Olivo was hired as the tight ends coach at Washington University in St. Louis. Following one season in St. Louis, Olivo returned to Missouri, joining Eliah Drinkwitz's staff as a special teams analyst.

On February 2, 2026, Olivo was hired to serve as an assistant special teams coach for the Miami Dolphins under new head coach Jeff Hafley.

== Personal life ==
In 2008, Olivo ran unsuccessfully for Congress in Missouri's 9th congressional district, losing the Republican primary to eventual victor Blaine Luetkemeyer.

Olivo has two children, Sofia and James.
