= Brandon Archer =

American football player (born 1983)

No. 53
- Position: Linebacker

Personal information
- Born: October 30, 1983 (age 43); Minneapolis, Minnesota, U.S.
- Listed height: 6 ft 0 in (1.83 m)
- Listed weight: 230 lb (104 kg)

Career information
- High school: Cretin-Derham Hall (Saint Paul, Minnesota)
- College: Kansas State
- NFL draft: 2007: undrafted

Career history
- Indianapolis Colts (2007)*; Minnesota Vikings (2007)*; Indianapolis Colts (2007); Denver Broncos (2008)*; Indianapolis Colts (2008)*; Washington Redskins (2008)*; Rhinos Milano (2009–2010)
- * Offseason or practice squad member only

Awards and highlights
- First-team All-Big 12 (2006)

Career NFL statistics
- Total tackles: 14
- Stats at Pro Football Reference

Brandon Archer (born October 30, 1983) is an American former professional football player who was a linebacker in the National Football League (NFL). He began his professional career as an undrafted free agent, signing with the Indianapolis Colts and playing for them during the 2007 season. Archer also had experience playing in the Italian Football League (IFL). He played college football at Kansas State.

In addition to his time with the Colts, Archer also served as a practice squad member for the Minnesota Vikings, Denver Broncos, and Washington Redskins.

In 2009, Archer signed with the Rhinos Milano and played in the Italian Football League.
