= Jason Johnson (quarterback) =

American gridiron football player and coach (born 1979)

No. 18, 16
- Position: Quarterback

Personal information
- Born: December 7, 1979 (age 46); Johnson City, Tennessee , U.S.
- Listed height: 6 ft 3 in (1.91 m)
- Listed weight: 260 lb (118 kg)

Career information
- High school: Rogers (Puyallup, Washington)
- College: Arizona

Career history

Playing
- 2004–2006: Edmonton Eskimos
- 2008: Catania Elephants
- 2009: Swarco Raiders

Coaching
- 2010–2011: Pacific Lutheran (QB)

Awards and highlights
- Eurobowl XXIII champion 2009; Grey Cup champion (2005)
- Stats at CFL.ca

Jason Johnson (born December 7, 1979) is an American former professional football quarterback who played three seasons with the Edmonton Eskimos of the Canadian Football League (CFL), winning the 93rd Grey Cup. He also spent two seasons in Europe, playing for the Catania Elephants of the Italian Football League (IFL) and the Swarco Raiders of the Austrian Football League (AFL).

== College career ==
Johnson played college football at the University of Arizona and attended Rogers High School in Puyallup, Washington. While at Arizona, he earned two all conference honors and he would break many school records including most passing yards in a game. He won the 2001 Woody Hayes Award as the top male scholar-athlete in Division I sports.

== Professional career ==
Johnson was a member of the Edmonton Eskimos team that won the 93rd Grey Cup. He also played for the Swarco Raiders of the Austrian Football League in 2009. The Raiders lost in the Austrian league semi final, but Johnson helped the Raiders to win the European championship Euro Bowl XXIII defeating the La Courneuve Flash of France 30-19. He played for the Catania Elephants of the Italian Football League in 2008 and led the league in passer rating and touchdown passes.

== Post-playing career ==
Johnson served as quarterbacks coach of the Pacific Lutheran Lutes from 2010 to 2011. He currently works as a cameraman, director, producer, and writer and has contributed work to ESPN, CBS, the NFL, and most frequently USA Football. He won a Sports Emmy award for Outstanding Short Feature for his work with ESPN's College GameDay on a story about Maryland defensive end Melvin Kiehn.
