= Drew Folmar =

American football coach (born c. 1978)

Current position
- Title: Head coach
- Team: Millersville
- Conference: PSAC
- Record: 0–0

Biographical details
- Born: c. 1978 (age 47–48); Chambersburg, Pennsylvania, U.S.
- Education: Millersville University (2001)

Playing career

Football
- 1997–2000: Millersville
- 2002: Legnano Frogs

Baseball
- 2000: Millersville
- Positions: Quarterback (football); Pitcher (baseball)

Coaching career (HC unless noted)

Football
- 2001: Millersville (GA)
- 2002: Merchant Marine (WR)
- 2003–2007: Millersville (WR)
- 2008: New Haven (OC/QB)
- 2009–2012: Kutztown (OC/QB)
- 2013: Kutztown
- 2014–2016: Lehigh (OC/QB)
- 2017–2018: Elon (OC/QB)
- 2019–2024: Elon (AHC/OC/QB)
- 2025: Bucknell (OC)
- 2026–present: Millersville

Head coaching record
- Overall: 4–7

Accomplishments and honors

Awards
- 3× All-PSAC (1998–2000)

Drew Folmar (born c. 1978) is an American college football coach. He is the head football coach for Millersville University, a position he has held since 2026. He was the head football coach for Kutztown University of Pennsylvania in 2013. He also coached for Millersville, Merchant Marine, New Haven, Lehigh, Elon, and Bucknell. He played college football for Millersville as a quarterback and professionally for the Legnano Frogs of the Italian Football League (IFL).

== Head coaching record ==
Year	Team	Overall	Conference	Standing	Bowl/playoffs
Kutztown Golden Bears (Pennsylvania State Athletic Conference) (2013)
2013	Kutztown	4–7	3–4	5th (East)	
Kutztown:		4–7	3–4		
Millersville Marauders (Pennsylvania State Athletic Conference) (2026–present)
2026	Millersville	0–0	0–0	(East)	
Millersville:		0–0	0–0		
Total:		4–7			
