= Kendial Lawrence =

American football player (born 1991)

No. 32
- Position: Running back

Personal information
- Born: April 13, 1991 (age 35); Rockwall, Texas, U.S.
- Listed height: 5 ft 9 in (1.75 m)
- Listed weight: 193 lb (88 kg)

Career information
- College: Missouri

Career history
- 2013: Dallas Cowboys
- 2013: Hamilton Tiger-Cats
- 2014: Milan Rhinos
- 2014–2015: Edmonton Eskimos
- 2016: Saskatchewan Roughriders
- 2016: Hamilton Tiger-Cats
- 2017: Edmonton Eskimos

Awards and highlights
- Grey Cup champion (2015)

Career CFL statistics
- Rushing yards: 712
- Rushing average: 5.4
- Rushing touchdowns: 4
- Receptions: 96
- Receiving yards: 927
- Receiving touchdowns: 5
- Stats at CFL.ca

Kendial Lawrence (born April 13, 1991) is an American former professional football player who was a running back in the Canadian Football League (CFL). He signed with the Dallas Cowboys as an undrafted free agent in 2013. He played college football for the Missouri Tigers. Lawrence also played in the Italian Football League (IFL).

== Professional career ==
Pre-draft measurables
Height	Weight	Arm length	Hand span	40-yard dash	10-yard split	20-yard split	20-yard shuttle	Three-cone drill	Vertical jump	Broad jump	Bench press
5 ft 8 5/8 in (1.74 m)	194 lb (88 kg)	28 7/8 in (0.73 m)	8 1/4 in (0.21 m)	4.33 s	1.54 s	2.54 s	4.33 s	6.95 s	37 in (0.94 m)	10 ft 5 in (3.18 m)	19 reps
All values from Missouri's Pro Day

=== Dallas Cowboys ===
On April 28, 2013, he signed with the Dallas Cowboys as an undrafted free agent. On August 31, 2013, he was released.

=== Hamilton Tiger-Cats (first stint) ===
On September 9, 2013, he signed with the Hamilton Tiger-Cats of the Canadian Football League (CFL).

=== Milan Rhinos ===
Lawrence signed for the 2014 season with the Rhinos Milano in the Italian Football League. Between trips to USA for tryouts with the Kansas City Chiefs and Edmonton Eskimos, Lawrence played in three games for the Rhinos Milano rushing for 307 yards and three touchdowns before signing with the Eskimos on June 24 of 2014.

=== Edmonton Eskimos (first stint) ===
After playing football in Italy during the spring and early summer in 2014, Lawrence signed with the Edmonton Eskimos of the Canadian Football League, partway through the 2014 CFL season. After putting up a dazzling 850 yards from scrimmage in 2014 in half season, Lawrence's stats on offense slipped in 2015, while Lawrence's usage on special teams as a returner increased for the eventual Grey Cup champion Eskimos.

=== Saskatchewan Roughriders ===
Lawrence was signed by the Saskatchewan Roughriders on February 10, 2016. Lawrence played in 11 games for the Roughriders carrying the ball 37 times for 150 yards with one touchdown. He also caught 17 passes for 129 yards and was used extensively on punt and kick-off return. He was released by the club on October 1, 2016.

=== Hamilton Tiger-Cats (second stint) ===
Lawrence was added to the Tiger-Cats practice roster on October 10, 2016. Lawrence played in two games for the Ticats in the 2016 season, catching one pass for 20 yards to go along with 209 combined return yards.

=== Edmonton Eskimos (second stint) ===
Lawrence signed as a free agent with the Eskimos. However, he was released by the club on June 17 as they trimmed their roster in preparation for the regular season. Following a season-ending injury to John White the Eskimos signed Lawrence to a contract on July 6, 2017 before ending up with his own season ending injury after 2 games. Lawrence became a free agent when his contract expired in February 2018.
