= Stadio Giovanni Mari =

Sports venue in Legnano, Italy

Coordinates: 45°35′22″N 8°54′35″E

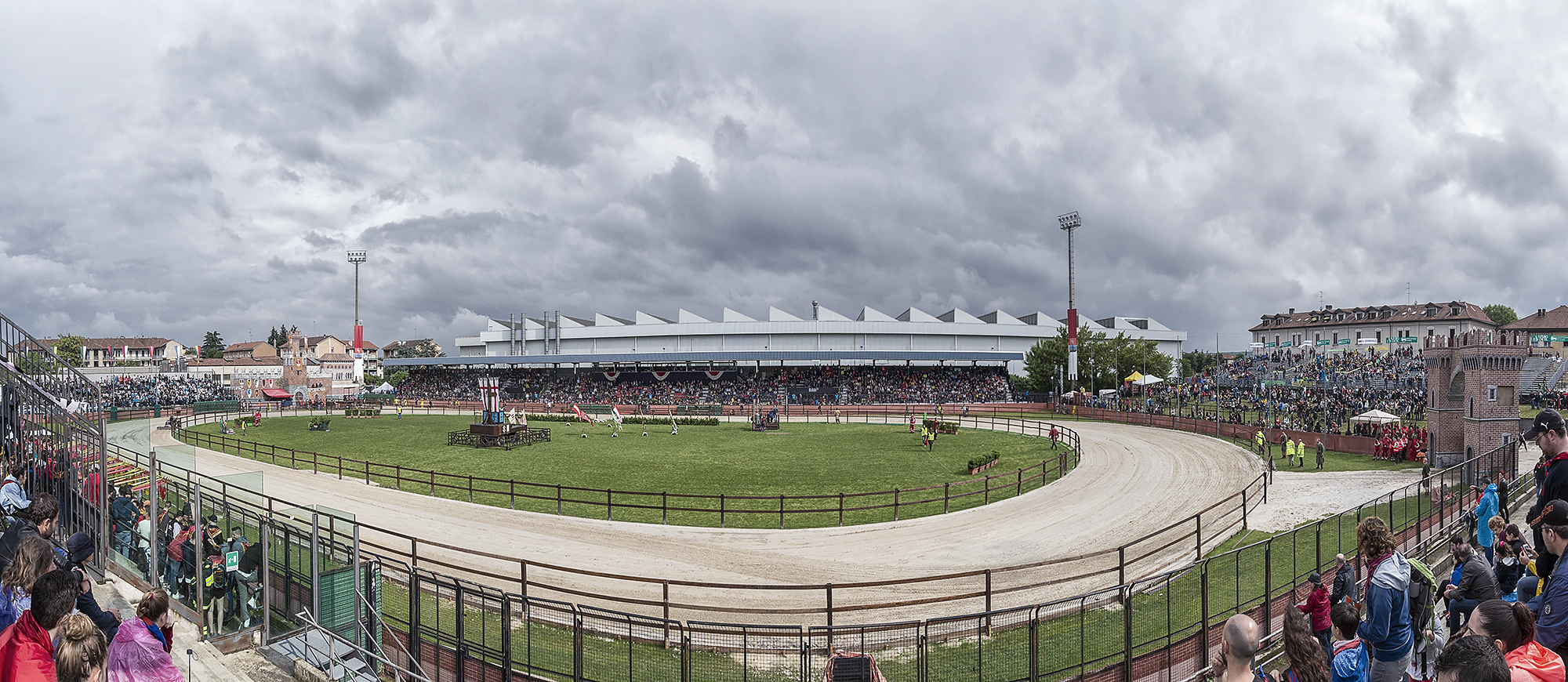
- Interactive map of Stadio Giovanni Mari
- Address: Via Carlo Pisacane
- Location: Legnano, Italy
- Owner: Municipality of Legnano
- Capacity: 5,000
- Surface: Grass
- Field size: 105 x 65 m
- Field shape: rectangular

Construction
- Groundbreaking: 1920
- Opened: 2 October 1921

Tenants
- A.C. Legnano; Palio di Legnano

Stadio Giovanni Mari is a multi-use stadium in Legnano, Italy. It is currently used mostly for football matches and is the home ground of A.C. Legnano. The stadium holds 5,000 people. It is also used for the horse race of Palio di Legnano.

== History ==
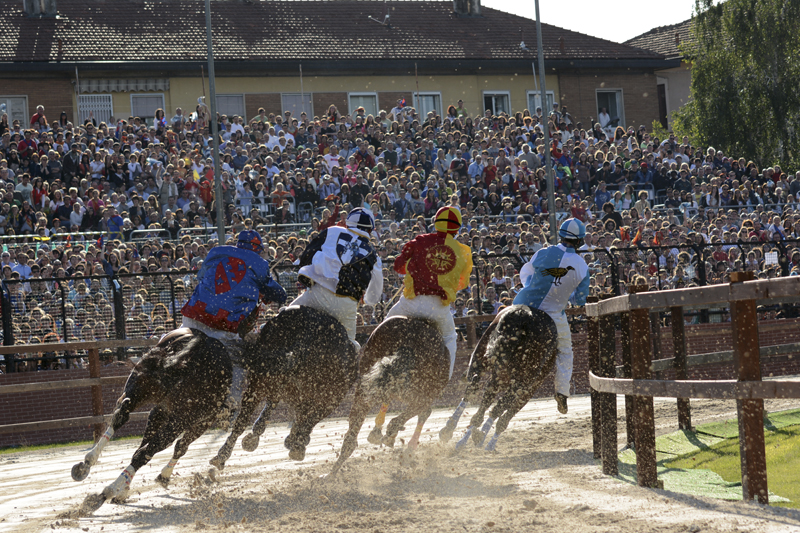
Stadio Giovanni Mari during Palio di Legnano 2013

The plant, built near the plants of the engineering company Franco Tosi inspired by similar plants built in England, was inaugurated on 2 October 1921 with a ceremony that foresaw an athletics event organized by the Legnano Gymnastics which lasted from 8.30 am to 5 pm.

After this event a football match was held between the A.C. Legnano and Inter, valid for the 1921–22 Prima Divisione (CCI), which ended with the result of 6-0 for the Legnanesi. Originally the sports facility was called "the city stadium in via Pisacane", from the name of the street in which it is located.

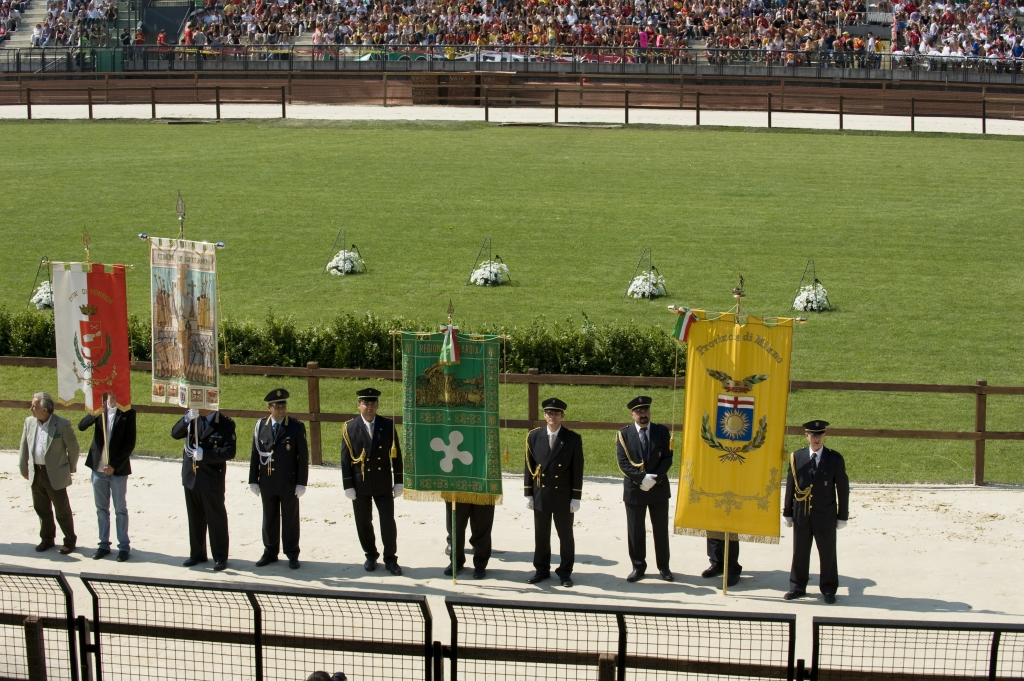
Stadio Giovanni Mari during Palio di Legnano 2014

Before the inauguration of the stadium, the A.C. Legnano played home games on a soccer field in via Lodi, built at the expense of Franco Tosi and the industrialist Antonio Bernocchi. The Via Lodi field, after the construction of the Via Pisacane stadium, continued to be used by the A.C. Legnano as a competition field for the youth sector and as a training ground, a place of use that remained in use until the end of the 1990s century. Later the via Lodi camp was transformed into a municipal boules alley.

From 1937 to the stadium of via Pisacane is organized annually, on the last Sunday of May, the horse race of the palio di Legnano. The first edition of the palio horse race in Legnano (1935) was instead played at the former Brusadelli camp, a facility built as a sports center for the after-work of the Cotonificio Dell'Acqua and later named after Pino Cozzi, historic president of the Unione Sportiva Legnanese. The stadium in Via Pisacane, before the horse race, is the scene of the last phase of the historical parade as well as the preparatory events for the horse race, such as the honors to the Carroccio and the charge of the figurants who impersonate the Compagnia della Morte; This assault was made, according to legend, by the military structure led by Alberto da Giussano during the battle of Legnano.

In the fifties, with the A.C. Legnano between Serie A and Serie B, the capacity of the Via Pisacane stadium was increased to 22,000 spectators thanks to the use of temporary stands that were made of tubular steel structures.

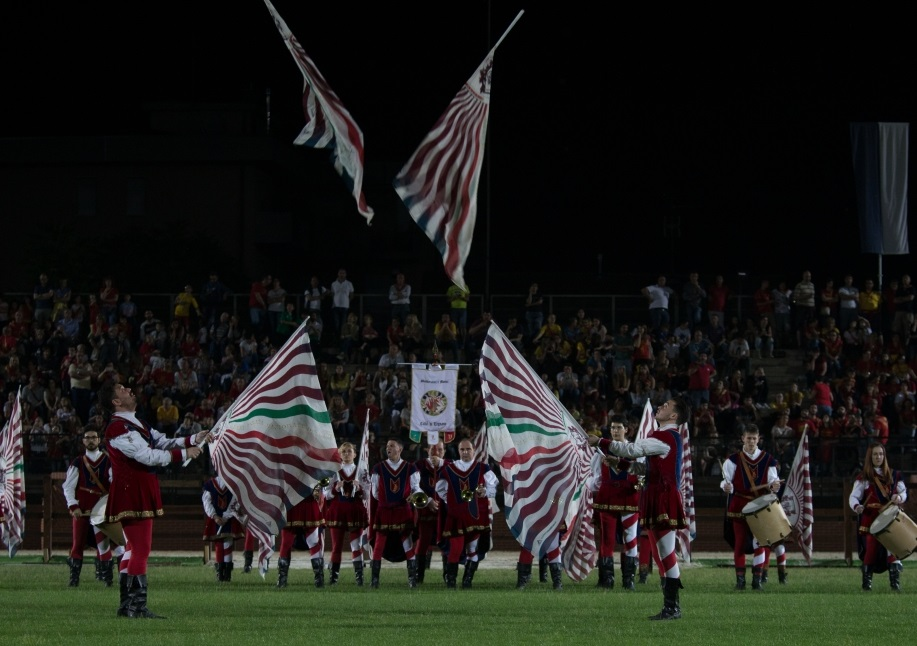
Stadio Giovanni Mari during Palio di Legnano 2016

On 11 October 1987, it was dedicated to the historic president of the A.C. Legnano Giovanni Mari, died 4 September of the same year. The title was made official on the occasion of the football match with the Pro Patria, football team of the neighboring city of Busto Arsizio.

On 2 July 1994, the Giovanni Mari stadium hosted the XIV Italian Superbowl, won by the Frogs Legnano on the Rhinos Milano for 37 to 27, thanks to which the people of Legnano won their fifth championship.

Following the bankruptcy of the A.C. Legnano, between 2011 and 2015, the plant hosted the home games of the Associazione Sportiva Dilettantistica Legnano 1913 Calcio, which in 2015 reacquired the rights to use the symbol and the historic denomination A.C. Legnano.

== Description ==
The Giovanni Mari stadium has a rectangular plan, with the grass football pitch having dimensions 105 x 65 m and fully enclosed. The stands, built in reinforced concrete are divided into four independent sectors: the central tribune to the south (the only one to be equipped with some seats and a roof made of pre-installed sheet metal on a metal frame), the Distinti to the north and two curves to east and west (dedicated respectively to guest fans and local organized groups).

All 5,000 seats in the system are seated and there are no spaces for standing spectators. Since there is no athletics track or similar infrastructure, the stands are mostly directly facing the edges of the field: the maximum distance of the places from the grassy rectangle (equal to 20 m) is found on the western curve. The lighting of the field is ensured by four corner light towers.
