= Dukes Milano =

American football team based in Milan, Italy

General information
- Founded: 2026
- Stadium: Velodromo Vigorelli
- Headquartered: Milan
- Website: www.dukesmilano.com

The Dukes Milano are an American football team based in Milan, Italy. They will compete in the Italian Football League and was formed with the merger of the Rhinos Milano and Milano Seamen in August 2026.

== History ==
The Rhinos Milano was founded as Pantere Rosa di Piacenza in 1975 and three years later, they played in the first game between two Italian teams, where they defeated the Busto Arsizio Frogs. The Seamen Milano were founded by Sergio Galeotti, a shareholder of the "Giorgio Armani SpA" on October 27, 1981. The Rhinos won the Italian Bowl from 1981 to 1983, 1990 and 2016, while the Seamen won it in five out of six seasons from 2014 to 2019. Meanwhile, the Seamen moved the the European League of Football (ELF) in April 2022 before withdrawing in 2024.

On 10 August 2026, the Rhinos and Seamen announced their merger, a complete unification of both their senior, youth, and flag-football programs. Spearheaded by Justin Pugh, the clubs' names were retired, while the new Milano team's colors and jerseys will be revealed in the near future. On 20 November 2026, their new identity was unveiled as the Dukes Milano.
