= Tyrone Rush =

American football player (born 1971)

No. 39
- Position: Running back

Personal information
- Born: February 5, 1971 (age 55); Meridian, Mississippi, U.S.
- Listed height: 5 ft 11 in (1.80 m)
- Listed weight: 196 lb (89 kg)

Career information
- High school: Neshoba Central
- College: North Alabama
- NFL draft: 1994: undrafted

Career history
- Washington Redskins (1994); Hamilton Tiger-Cats (1996); Montreal Alouettes (1996); Barcelona Dragons (1997)*; Bergamo Lions (Italy) (1998-2004)
- * Offseason or practice squad member only
- Stats at Pro Football Reference

Tyrone Antonio Rush (born February 5, 1971) is an American former professional football player who was a running back for the Washington Redskins of the National Football League (NFL). He played college football for the North Alabama Lions. Rush played in five games for Washington in 1994. He also played several seasons in the Italian Football League (IFL).

== College ==
Rush played college football at the University of North Alabama, where he was an All American. He was also selected as the 1993 runner-up for the Harlon Hill Trophy as the NCAA Division II Player of the Year. Rush helped the Lions go 14-0 and win the Gulf South Conference and NCAA Division II National Championships. Rush was inducted to the North Alabama Hall of Fame in 2004. Rush holds several school records as of 2009, including:

- Most carries in a single season (237).
- Most career carries (791).
- Most yards gained in a game (248).
- Most yards gained in a career (4,421).
- Tied most 100-yard games in a regular season (7).
- Most 100-yard games in an entire season (8).
- Most consecutive 100-yard games (5).
- Most 100-yard games in a career (21).
- Most career all-purpose yards (6,020).
- Most rushing touchdowns in a season (19).

== Italian Football League ==
Rush also played football professionally in Italy for the Bergamo Lions from 1998 to 2004 where he was one of the top players in Europe, being named to the European Federation of American Football All Europe team on more than one occasion. Rush was Italian Football League season MVP in 1999, and set the league season rushing record. Rush helped the Lions win Eurobowl championships, and was named the Eurobowl game MVP in 2000.

He later participated on the show Extreme Dodgeball on the Game Show Network in each of its three seasons. He spent his first two seasons on the Barbell Mafia, and his last on the New York Bling, the champion of the final season. He led the league in kills in Season Three of the show. His nickname was "The Rush Factor".
