= Giorgio Tavecchio =

Italian-born American football player (born 1990)

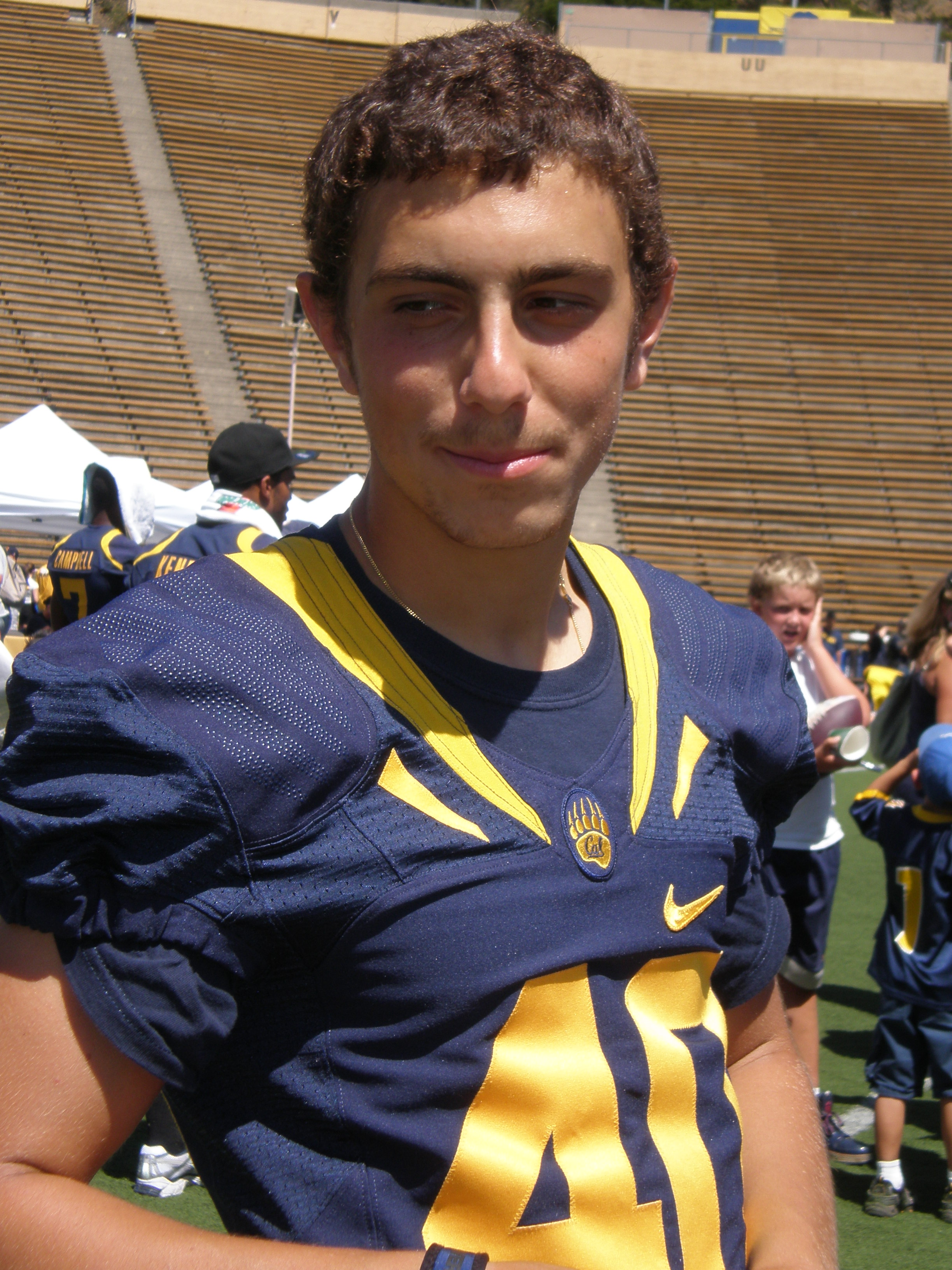
- Tavecchio with the California Golden Bears in 2009

No. 40 – Milano Seamen
- Position: Placekicker
- Roster status: Active

Personal information
- Born: July 16, 1990 (age 36); Milan, Italy
- Listed height: 5 ft 10 in (1.78 m)
- Listed weight: 182 lb (83 kg)

Career information
- High school: Campolindo (Moraga, California, U.S.)
- College: California (2008–2011)
- NFL draft: 2012: undrafted

Career history
- San Francisco 49ers (2012)*; Green Bay Packers (2013)*; Detroit Lions (2014)*; Oakland Raiders (2014–2017); Atlanta Falcons (2018); Los Angeles Wildcats (2020); Tennessee Titans (2020)*; Barcelona Dragons (2021–2022); Milano Seamen (2023–present)
- * Offseason or practice squad member only

Career NFL statistics
- Field goals: 21
- Field goals attempted: 26
- Field goal %: 80.8
- Longest field goal: 56
- Touchbacks: 48
- Stats at Pro Football Reference

Giorgio Tavecchio (Italian pronunciation: [ˈdʒordʒo taˈvɛkkjo]; born July 16, 1990), nicknamed "Italian Ice", is an Italian professional football placekicker for the Milano Seamen of the European League of Football (ELF). He played college football for the California Golden Bears and signed with the San Francisco 49ers as an undrafted free agent in 2012. Tavecchio has also been a member of the Green Bay Packers, Oakland Raiders, Atlanta Falcons, Los Angeles Wildcats, Tennessee Titans, and Barcelona Dragons.

== College career ==
Tavecchio's original plan was to attend the University of California, Davis, after they offered him a soccer scholarship. Because UC Davis was not also interested in him as a football placekicker, he considered other options. He then set up a workout at the University of California, Berkeley, but was only offered to be a walk-on.

Tavecchio began attending UC Berkeley in 2008 and competed with David Seawright and Jordan Kay to be the California Golden Bears placekicker. As a freshman, he split time with Seawright and converted all 25 extra point attempts and 9-of-13 field goal attempts. As a sophomore in 2009, he competed with Vincenzo D'Amato for the placekicking duties. With D'Amato handling a majority of the work, Tavecchio converted 14-of-15 extra point attempts and 8-of-12 field goal attempts. As a junior in 2010, he handled all of the placekicking duties and converted 37-of-39 extra point attempts and 11-of-16 field goal attempts. Throughout his first three seasons, he posted a 68% field goal percentage and was able to reach 75% after his senior year. In his final collegiate season in 2011, he continued to handle all placekicking duties and converted 36-of-42 extra point attempts and 20-of-23 field goal attempts. In his senior season, he had his best statistical kicking performance against Arizona State in a 47–38 victory. In the win over the Sun Devils, he converted all five extra point attempts and all four field goal attempts. His 20 field goals made in the 2011 season led the Pac-12 Conference. During his time at Cal, he was a four-year starter.

=== College statistics ===
Season	Team	Conf	Class	Pos	GP	Kicking						
Season	Team	Conf	Class	Pos	GP	XPM	XPA	XP%	FGM	FGA	FG%	Pts
2008	California	Pac-10	FR	K	10	25	25	100.0	9	13	69.2	52
2009	California	Pac-10	SO	K	11	14	14	100.0	8	12	66.7	38
2010	California	Pac-10	JR	K	12	37	39	94.9	11	16	68.8	70
2011	California	Pac-12	SR	K	13	36	42	85.7	20	23	87.0	96
Career					46	112	120	93.3	48	64	75.0	256

== Professional career ==
=== Pre-draft ===
Going into the draft, Tavecchio was not invited to the NFL Combine. During the California Golden Bears pro day, it began to rain before he was able to perform any drills. Tavecchio kept running his planned drills but was unable to showcase his talents since every NFL scout had gone into an indoor practice facility. Tavecchio remained unsigned after going undrafted in the 2012 NFL draft. He then attended a tryout for the San Francisco 49ers at which he was the only kicker present.

=== San Francisco 49ers ===
On August 29, 2012, Tavecchio signed a three-year, $1.44 million contract with the 49ers. At the time, 49ers special teams coach, Brad Seely was looking for an additional kicker to eventually succeed long-time veteran David Akers. The left-footed Tavecchio was chosen because Akers was also left-footed and they could both use the same holder, instead of getting another holder for a right-footed kicker.

=== Green Bay Packers ===
After being waived by the 49ers during the offseason, the Green Bay Packers signed Tavecchio to a three-year, $1.48 million contract on March 26, 2013.

Tavecchio was waivedon August 26.

=== Detroit Lions ===
The Detroit Lions signed Tavecchio to a reserve/futures contract on January 1, 2014. He was waived on August 25.

=== Oakland Raiders ===
On August 27, 2014, the Oakland Raiders claimed Tavecchio off of waivers. He was waived three days later.

On February 23, 2015, Tavecchio signed a contract to return to the Raiders. He was waived on September 5.

On January 5, 2016, the Raiders signed Tavecchio to a two-year, $990,000 reserve/futures contract. On August 29, he was released by the Raiders.

On April 19, 2017, Tavecchio again signed with the Raiders. He was waived by team on September 2, but was signed to the practice squad six days later. On September 9, Tavecchio was promoted to the active roster after longtime kicker Sebastian Janikowski was placed on the injured reserve list with a back injury.

Tavecchio played his first game on September 10, 2017, where he scored four field goals on four attempts, including two 52-yard attempts, and two extra points on two attempts, providing over half the scoring in a 26–16 victory over the Tennessee Titans. He became the first player to hit two 50-plus yard field goals on his debut in NFL history. Tavecchio's performance in Week 1 earned him AFC Special Teams Player of the Week. In the next game, a 45–20 victory over the New York Jets, Tavecchio had a season-high six extra points converted to go along with a 29-yard field goal. Overall, Tavecchio finished the 2017 season with 33-of-34 extra point attempts converted to go along with 16-of-21 field goals converted in all 16 games.

On August 3, 2018, Tavecchio was waived by the Raiders after the team signed veteran kicker Mike Nugent.

=== Atlanta Falcons ===
On August 27, 2018, Tavecchio was signed by the Atlanta Falcons. He was waived five days later. Tavecchio was re-signed by the team on October 10, 2018, after incumbent kicker Matt Bryant injured his hamstring after kicking a 57-yard field goal the previous week. In Week 7, Tavecchio converted both extra point attempts and all three of his field goal attempts, including a career long 56-yarder, in a 23–20 victory over the New York Giants, earning him NFC Special Teams Player of the Week.

On August 31, 2019, Tavecchio was waived by the Falcons after the team re-signed veteran kicker Matt Bryant.

=== Los Angeles Wildcats ===
Tavecchio signed with the Los Angeles Wildcats of the XFL on March 4, 2020. He had his contract terminated when the league suspended operations on April 10.

=== Tennessee Titans ===
On November 10, 2020, Tavecchio was signed to the Tennessee Titans practice squad. He was released on November 24.

=== Barcelona Dragons ===
On July 17, 2021, Tavecchio played his first match with the Barcelona Dragons (ELF) in the European League of Football. He converted one extra point attempt and three field goal attempts, including a 56-yarder.

=== Milano Seamen ===
On April 3, 2023, Tavecchio signed with the Milano Seamen.
