= Jeris McIntyre =

American gridiron football player and coach (born 1981)

Auburn Tigers
- Title: Director of Football & Alumni Relations

Personal information
- Born: July 4, 1981 (age 45); Tampa, Florida, U.S.
- Listed height: 6 ft 0 in (1.83 m)
- Listed weight: 203 lb (92 kg)

Career information
- High school: Tampa Catholic
- College: Auburn
- NFL draft: 2004: 6th round, 195th overall pick

Career history

Playing
- Kansas City Chiefs (2004–2005) (Note: Offseason and/or practice squad member only); Rhein Fire (2005); Kansas City Chiefs (2006) (Note: Offseason and/or practice squad member only); Dallas Desperados (2007); Toronto Argonauts (2007); Bergamo Lions (2008–2009)

Coaching
- Tampa Catholic (FL) HS (2015–2017) Wide receivers coach; Tampa Catholic (FL) HS (2018–2024) Head coach; UCF (2024–2025) Director of high school relations; Auburn (2026–present) Director of football & alumni relations

Awards and highlights
- All-NFL Europe (2005)

Jeris McIntyre (born July 4, 1981) is an American former professional football wide receiver who was selected by the Kansas City Chiefs in the sixth round of the 2004 NFL draft. McIntyre played college football for the Auburn Tigers from 2000 to 2003, and led the team with receptions and yards in 2003. Jeris played for the Kansas City Chiefs as well as NFL Europe's Rhein Fire an NFL developmental team, where he made the All-Europe team.

== Early life ==
Graduating from Tampa Catholic High School, Jeris McIntyre was a dual sports star in both football and baseball. After his high school career, he was recruited to play both sports by numerous colleges.

== College career ==
In 1999 Jeris signed to play football at Auburn University. While attending Auburn, Jeris was a 4-year Letterman and a three-year starter at Wide Receiver. During his senior year in 2003, he was Auburn's offensive captain as well as the leading wide receiver, finishing the season with 41 receptions and 621 yards as the go-to target for quarterback Jason Campbell, the (2005 1st round pick, Washington Redskins).

== Professional career ==
After his collegiate career at Auburn, Jeris was selected by the Kansas City Chiefs in the sixth round of the 2004 NFL draft with the 195th overall pick. On July 19, 2004, McIntyre signed a three-year contract with Kansas City. During the three seasons Jeris was in the Kansas City Chiefs organization, he played for legendary coach Dick Vermeil. In the spring of 2005 Jeris played in NFL Europe and was one of the leaders in yards per catch as well as being the Rhein Fires top Wide Receiver. After a successful stint in the NFL development league he was relegated back to the Chiefs practice squad. McIntyre tried to crack the Chiefs 2006 53-man lineup after signing a two-year contract with Kansas City on January 4, 2006, but was released on September 2. Jeris also later had stints with the Dallas Desperados of the Arena Football League (AFL), and after the Arena Football season ended, he signed with the Toronto Agros of the Canadian Football League (CFL). Afterwards, he went back to Europe, where he signed and played two seasons for the Bergamo Lions.
