= Legnano Frogs =

American football team in Legnano, Lombardy, Italy

General information
- Founded: 1977
- Stadium: Campo G. Malerba, San Vittore Olona, Italy
- Headquartered: Legnano, Italy
- Website: https://www.frogslegnano.com/it/

Personnel
- General manager: Ettore Guarneri

League / conference affiliations
- Italian Football League

Championships
- League championships: 0 (6) 1984, 1987, 1988, 1989, 1994, 1995

Current uniform
Home

Away

The Legnano Frogs established in 1977, are an American football team from the city of Legnano, in the Metropolitan City of Milan, in Lombardy, Italy. It has black and silver as its social colors, while it has a frog as a symbol, hence the name of the team.

In 2023, The Frogs will be back playing at the top level of the Italian Football League IFL.

Among the most successful American football teams in Italy, they were European Football League champions in 1989 (with two participations in the Eurobowl final), won six Italian Football League titles (with 11 participations in the Italian Bowl) and a Coppa Italia Bowl (1993). The youth team has won two Youngbowls (1991, 1992).

== History ==
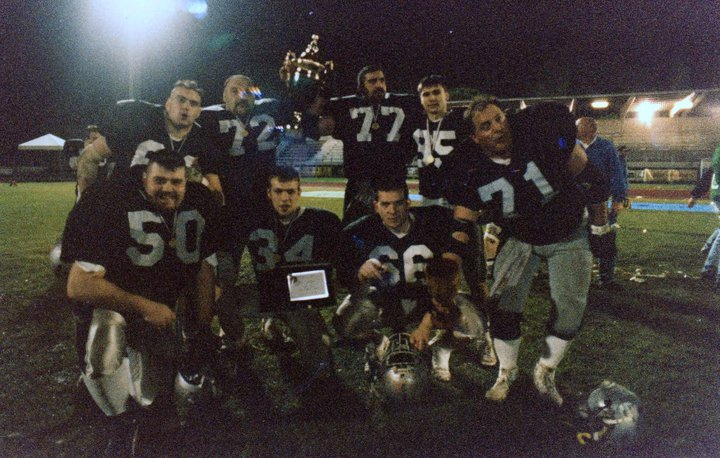
Legnano Frogs celebrate victory after winning the XV Italian Bowl in 1995

The team was founded by a group of boys from Gallarate in 1977. They decided to practice this sport after seeing it while vacationing in the United States.

The founders organized three small teams, with reference to as many bars in the area. From the spring of 1978 one of these teams, called Frogs (in reference to the 1972 horror film Frogs) from the Bianchi bar, who had gone there for work, began training with the Pink Panthers of Piacenza.

In Piacenza there were several players from the NATO base who taught the children the fundamentals of the sport. From the Pink Panthers, the Rhinos Milano was formed, one of the most important Italian football teams.

From 1978 to 1980, the Frogs played many friendlies, also participating in tournaments organized in NATO bases. Among the games played there was the first official match played between Italian American football teams in preparation for the first championship officially recognized by the federation; played on 24 June 1978 at the Stadio Carlo Speroni in Busto Arsizio, it was won 36–0 by the Rhinos Milano over the Gallarate Frogs.

In 1981, the first official championship was organized by the Italian American Football Association, consisting of five teams: the Frogs, the Rhinos Milano, the Jaguars Turin, the Rams Milano and the Eagles Ferrara. In 1984 the team moved to Busto Arsizio and changed its name to Busto Arsizio Frogs. In 1984 the Frogs beat an American team for the first time, the Derby Rangers of the NATO Naval Air Station in Tirrenia, 7–0.

In 1987 the Frogs were close to being absorbed by the Milano Seamen. However, it was decided by president Ulrico Lucarelli to move the team to Legnano and merge with the local Legnano Vikings instead. On this occasion the team changed its name to Legnano Frogs.

In 2001 the team moved to Milan and changed its name to Milano Frogs, while in 2002 they merged with the Kings Gallarate, moving the headquarters to Gallarate and changing its name to Gallarate Frogs. In 2003 the team returned to Legnano and changed its name back to Legnano Frogs.

In 2004 the Blue Storms Gorla Minore was formed from a corporate split and the Legnano Frogs did not participate in the championships. Following the 2008 federal demerger, they enrolled in the NFLI, later merging into the FIF; in these seasons the team has always taken part in the top league of their home federation, reaching the semi-final on two occasions.

In November 2010 they announced that they had applied for affiliation with FIDAF and signed up for the LENAF championship, in which they played from the year following 2016 (but never managed to reach the playoffs).

In 2017 they suspended their operations to carry out a major restructuring and did not participate in the championships. In 2018 they returned to participate in the Second Division championship, the second level of the Italian American football championship.

In 2023, after a long absence, the Frogs are back playing in the top level of the Italian Football League IFL.

== Name ==
- Gallarate Frogs: 1977–1983;
- Busto Arsizio Frogs: 1983–1986;
- Legnano Frogs: 1987–2000;
- Milano Frogs: 2001–2002;
- Gallarate Frogs: 2002–2003;
- Legnano Frogs: from 2003.

== Honours ==
- Italian Bowl
  - Champions: (6) 1984, 1987, 1988, 1989, 1994, 1995
- Coppa Italia
  - Champions: (1) 1993
- Youngbowl
  - Champions: (2) 1991, 1992
- Eurobowl
  - Champions: (1) 1989

== National tournaments ==
=== Championship ===
==== First division ====
Season	Regular season						Playoff						
	W	D	L	GP	PF	PA	W	L	GP	PF	PA	Result	Opponent
1981	5	0	3	8	114	69	0	1	1	8	24	Italian Bowl	Rhinos Milano
1982	9	0	1	10	462	40	1	1	2	7	11	Italian Bowl	Rhinos Milano
1983	10	0	0	10	244	41	0	1	1	6	28	Quarter-finals	Warriors Bologna
1984	10	0	0	10	241	37	3	0	3	71	36	Winner	Warriors Bologna
1985	12	0	0	12	507	74	1	1	2	34	20	Semi-final	Angels Pesaro
1986	9	1	0	10	248	27	1	1	2	54	46	Second round	Jets Bolzano
1987	12	0	0	12	370	54	4	0	4	107	50	Winner	Seamen Milano
1988	12	0	0	12	489	118	4	0	4	121	21	Winner	Warriors Bologna
1989	10	0	2	12	327	183	3	0	3	110	55	Winner	Seamen Milano
1990	10	0	2	12	427	213	2	1	3	90	84	Italian Bowl	Rhinos Milano
1991	3	1	5	9	182	209	0	1	1	19	34	Quarter-finals	Lions Bergamo
1992	7	0	5	12	263	239	0	1	1	37	40	Quarter-finals	Pharaones Milano
1993	7	0	3	10	308	291	1	1	2	56	64	Semi-final	Gladiatori Roma
1994	9	1	0	10	248	137	2	0	2	88	80	Winner	Rhinos Milano
1995	12	0	0	12	429	139	3	0	3	100	59	Winner	Gladiatori Roma
1996	11	0	1	12	410	156	1	1	2	88	47	Semi-final	Phoenix Bologna
1997	7	0	3	10	242	151	2	1	3	66	55	Italian Bowl	Phoenix Bologna
1998	8	0	2	10	315	131	1	1	2	71	44	Italian Bowl	Lions Bergamo
1999	4	0	4	8	214	199	0	1	1	18	30	Semi-final	Giants Bolzano
2001	7	0	1	8	172	90	1	1	2	34	28	Semi-final	Dolphins Ancona
2002	2	0	5	7	141	203	2	1	3	89	84	Semi-final	Lions Bergamo
2003	3	0	5	8	144	205	0	1	1	0	47	Semi-final	Lions Bergamo
2008	2	0	6	8	111	252	-	-	-	-	-	-	-
2009	5	0	5	10	162	303	1	1	2	49	58	Semi-final	Red Jackets Sarzana
2010	4	0	4	8	154	169	1	1	2	23	21	Semi-final	Bengals Brescia
Total	190	3	57	250	6924	3730	34	17	51	1346	1066		

Source: Enciclopedia del Football (In Italian)

==== Second division ====
Season	Regular season						Playoff						
	W	D	L	GP	PF	PA	W	L	GP	PF	PA	Result	Opponent
2000	4	0	4	8	90	86	-	-	-	-	-	-	-
2006	1	0	6	7	27	180	-	-	-	-	-	-	-
2007	6	0	0	6	184	60	-	-	-	-	-	-	-
2011	2	0	6	8	178	301	-	-	-	-	-	-	-
2012	1	0	7	8	156	230	-	-	-	-	-	-	-
2013	2	0	6	8	90	137	-	-	-	-	-	-	-
2014	1	0	7	8	177	192	-	-	-	-	-	-	-
2015	0	0	8	8	53	252	-	-	-	-	-	-	-
2016	3	0	5	8	177	209	-	-	-	-	-	-	-
2018	0	0	8	8	6	430	-	-	-	-	-	-	-
2020	No season played because of the COVID-19 pandemic												
2021	0	0	6	6	26	202	-	-	-	-	-	-	-
2022	2	0	4	6	54	138	-	-	-	-	-	-	-
Total	22	0	67	89	1218	2417	-	-	-	-	-		

Source: Enciclopedia del Football (In Italian)

==== Third division ====
Season	Regular season						Playoff						
	W	D	L	GP	PF	PA	W	L	GP	PF	PA	Result	Opponent
2005	1	0	5	6	21	164	-	-	-	-	-	-	-
2019	0	0	6	6	48	278	-	-	-	-	-	-	-
Total	1	0	11	12	69	442	-	-	-	-	-		

Source: Enciclopedia del Football (In Italian)

=== Coppa Italia ===
Season	Regular season						Playoff						
	W	D	L	GP	PF	PA	W	L	GP	PF	PA	Result	Opponent
1993	-	-	-	-	-	-	4	0	4	90+?	37+?	Winner	Gladiatori Roma
Total	-	-	-	-	-	-	4	0	4	90+?	37+?		

Source: Enciclopedia del Football (In Italian)

== Youth tournaments ==
=== Under-21 ===
Season	Regular season						Playoff						
	W	D	L	GP	PF	PA	W	L	GP	PF	PA	Result	Opponent
1990	?	?	?	?	?	?	?	?	?	?	?	?	?
1991	?	?	?	?	?	?	3	0	3	143	38	Winner	Gladiatori Roma
1992	?	?	?	?	?	?	3	0	3	28	15	Winner	Pythons Milano
1993	?	?	?	?	?	?	?	?	?	24?	34?	?	Gladiatori Roma
1994	?	?	?	?	?	?	?	?	?	?	?	?	?
1998	?	?	?	?	?	?	?	?	?	?	?	?	?
2004	0	0	5	7	28	161	-	-	-	-	-	-	-
2005	0	0	4	4	7	129	-	-	-	-	-	-	-
2006	3	0	0	3	48	26	0	1	1	0	20	Round of 16	Guelfi Firenze
2007	2	0	2	4	84	105	-	-	-	-	-	-	-
2008	5	0	1	6	143	69	1	1	2	41	48	Semi-final	Green Hogs Reggio Emilia
2009	2	0	2	4	80	84	-	-	-	-	-	-	-
Total	12+?	0+?	14+?	26+?	390+?	574+?	7+?	2+?	9+?	212+?	121+?		

Source: Enciclopedia del Football (In Italian)

=== Under-20 ===
Season	Regular season						Playoff						
	W	D	L	GP	PF	PA	W	L	GP	PF	PA	Result	Opponent
1984	4	0	1	5	136	21	1	1	2	7	21	Youngbowl	Bobcats Parma
1985	3	1	0	4	60+?	24+?	0	1	1	12	24	Quarter-finals	Duchi Ferrara
1986	?	?	?	?	?	?	0	1	1	20	30	Quarter-finals	Doves Bologna
1987	2	1	0	4	48+?	20+?	0	1	1	?	?	Quarter-finals	Duchi Ferrara
1988	2	0	2	4	29	35	-	-	-	-	-	-	-
1989	4	0	2	6	82	50	0	1	1	2	3	Quarter-finals	Saints Padova
1995	4	0	2	6	120	151	0	1	1	20	47	Quarter-finals	Gladiatori Roma
2003	0	0	6	6	23	204	-	-	-	-	-	-	-
Total	19+?	2+?	13+?	34+?	498+?	515+?	1	6	7	61+?	125+?		

Source: Enciclopedia del Football (In Italian)

=== Under-18 ===
Season	Regular season						Playoff						
	W	D	L	GP	PF	PA	W	L	GP	PF	PA	Result	Opponent
1996	?	?	?	?	?	?	?	?	?	?	?	?	?
1997	1	0	5	6	53	209	-	-	-	-	-	-	-
Total	1+?	0+?	5+?	6+?	53+?	209+?	?	?	?	?	?		

Source: Enciclopedia del Football (In Italian)

=== Under-17 ===
Season	Regular season						Playoff						
	W	D	L	GP	PF	PA	W	L	GP	PF	PA	Result	Opponent
2006	2	0	1	3	68	42	0	1	1	0	56	Quarter-finals	Rangers Sarzana
Total	2	0	1	3	68	42	0	1	1	0	56		

Source: Enciclopedia del Football (In Italian)

== International tournaments ==
=== European Football League ===
Season	Regular season						Playoff						
	W	D	L	GP	PF	PA	W	L	GP	PF	PA	Result	Opponent
1987–88	-	-	-	-	-	-	1	1	2	101	35	Semi-final	Helsinki Roosters
1989	-	-	-	-	-	-	2	0	2	73	38	Winner	Amsterdam Crusaders
1990	-	-	-	-	-	-	1	1	2	67	56	Eurobowl	Manchester Spartans
1991	-	-	-	-	-	-	1	1	2	70	68	Semi-final	Berlin Adler
1995	-	-	-	-	-	-	1	1	2	64	67	Semi-final	Düsseldorf Panther
1996	1	0	1	2	60	62	1	1	2	63	33	Semi-final	Aix-en-Provence Argonautes
1999	1	0	1	2	52	43	1	1	2	49	55	Semi-final	Hamburg Blue Devils
Total	2	0	2	4	112	105	8	6	14	487	352		

Source: Enciclopedia del Football (In Italian)

== Summary of the final stages played ==
Year	Place	Event	Tournament stage	Match	Result
1981	Santa Margherita Ligure	Superbowl	Final	Rhinos Milano – Gallarate Frogs	24–8
1982	Pesaro	Superbowl	Final	Rhinos Milano – Gallarate Frogs	11–0
1984	Rimini	Superbowl	Final	Warriors Bologna – Busto Arsizio Frogs	6–16
1985	Busto Arsizio	Superbowl	Semi-final	Frogs Busto Arsizio – Angels Pesaro	12–13
1987	Rimini	Superbowl	Final	Seamen Milano – Legnano Frogs	24–27
1988	Ancona	Superbowl	Final	Warriors Bologna – Legnano Frogs	0–17
1988	Brighton	Eurobowl	Semi-final	Legnano Frogs – Helsinki Roosters	33–35
1989	Parma	Superbowl	Final	Seamen Milano – Legnano Frogs	33–39
1989	Legnano	Eurobowl	Final	Legnano Frogs – Amsterdam Crusaders	27–23
1990	Rimini	Superbowl	Final	Rhinos Milano – Legnano Frogs	33–6
1990	Rimini	Eurobowl	Final	Legnano Frogs – Manchester Spartans	22–34
1991	Rome	Youngbowl	Final	Gladiatori Roma – Legnano Frogs	26–42
1991	Berlin	Eurobowl	Semi-final	Berlin Adler – Legnano Frogs	41–37
1992	Bienate	Youngbowl	Final	Legnano Frogs – Pythons Milano	28–15
1992	Sesto San Giovanni	Coppa Italia	Final	Legnano Frogs – Gladiatori Roma	25–24
1993	Rome	Youngbowl	QF o SF	Gladiatori Roma – Legnano Frogs	34–24
1994	Legnano	Superbowl	Final	Legnano Frogs – Rhinos Milano	37–27
1995	Düsseldorf	Eurobowl	Semi-final	Düsseldorf Panther – Legnano Frogs	35–31
1995	Cesenatico	Superbowl	Final	Legnano Frogs – Gladiatori Roma	32–26
1996	Legnano	Eurobowl	Semi-final	Legnano Frogs – Aix-en-Provence Argonautes	17–20
1996	San Lazzaro di Savena	Superbowl	Semi-final	Phoenix San Lazzaro – Legnano Frogs	35–34
1997	Monza	Superbowl	Final	Legnano Frogs – Phoenix San Lazzaro	35–42
1998	Catania	Superbowl	Final	Legnano Frogs – Lions Bergamo	28–29
1999	Bolzano	Superbowl	Semi-final	Giants Bolzano – Legnano Frogs	30–18
1999	Hamburg	Eurobowl	Semi-final	Hamburg Blue Devils – Legnano Frogs	41–21
2001	Milan	Superbowl	Semi-final	Milano Frogs – Dolphins Ancona	9–21
2002	Osio Sotto	Superbowl	Semi-final	Lions Bergamo – Milano Frogs	49–7
2003	Osio Sotto	Superbowl	Semi-final	Lions Bergamo – Gallarate Frogs	47–0
2007	Molinella	Ninebowl	Final	Angels Pesaro – Legnano Frogs	29–8
2008	Reggio Emilia	Youngbowl	Semi-final	Hogs Reggio Emilia – Legnano Frogs	42–16
2009	La Spezia	Superbowl	Semi-final	Red Jackets Sarzana – Legnano Frogs	42–28
2010	Villaggio Sereno	Superbowl	Semi-final	Bengals Brescia – Legnano Frogs	14–8

Source: Enciclopedia del Football (In Italian)

== MVP of the Italian Bowl ==
- Pier Paolo Gallivanone, MVP of the IV Italian Bowl;
- Robert Frasco, American import QB who helped the Frogs win the 1989 Eurobowl. Played at San Jose State University and a stint in the NFL.
- For the Frogs, Frasco was MVP of the VII, VIII and IX Italian Bowl;
- Gianluca Orrigoni, MVP of the XIV Italian Bowl;
- Paolo Verrini, MVP of the XV Italian Bowl.

== Frogs inducted into the Italian American Football Hall of Fame ==
- Pier Paolo Gallivanone, quarterback, MVP of the IV Italian Bowl, inducted in 2006;
- Luca Saguatti, linebacker, inducted in 2007.
- Robert Frasco, Quarterback inducted 2015

== See also ==
- American football
- Busto Arsizio
- Gallarate
- Legnano
