= Stadio Sergio Lanfranchi =

Rugby stadium in Parma, Italy

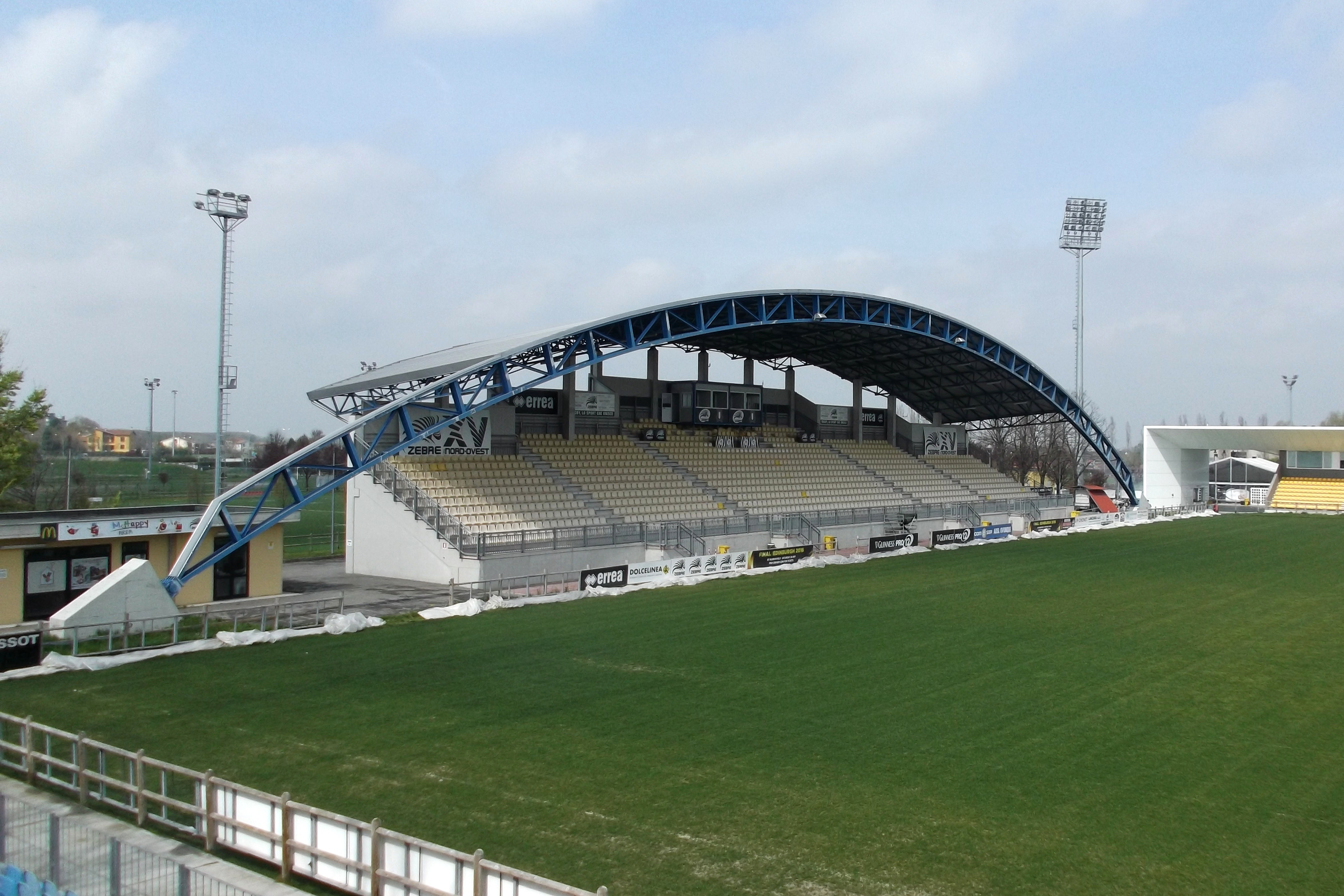
- Interactive map of Stadio Sergio Lanfranchi
- Location: Cortile San Martino (complesso sportivo Moletolo); 43100 Parma, Italy
- Coordinates: 44°49′30″N 10°19′59″E
- Owner: City of Parma
- Capacity: 5,000
- Surface: Grass
- Public transit: Parma railway station Moletolo Centro Sportivo bus stop (route 15)

Construction
- Groundbreaking: 2007
- Opened: 2008
- Renovated: 2014

Tenants
- Zebre Parma (2012–present); Crociati Parma Rugby FC; Gran Parma Rugby; Parma Panthers

Stadio Sergio Lanfranchi, previously known as Stadio XXV Aprile, is a sports stadium dedicated to rugby union, located in the city of Parma in the Emilia-Romagna region of northern Italy. It replaced the original Stadio Sergio Lanfranchi which was demolished in July 2008.

It is a 5,000 seat arena which hosts Crociati Parma Rugby FC and Gran Parma Rugby rugby union teams. It also hosts the Parma Panthers American football team. In 2012 it also became the home stadium of the Zebre Parma franchise which replaced Aironi in the Pro12 league and Heineken Cup.

In January 2015, the Stadio XXV Aprile was renamed as the Stadio Sergio Lanfranchi, the previous stadium of that name having been demolished.

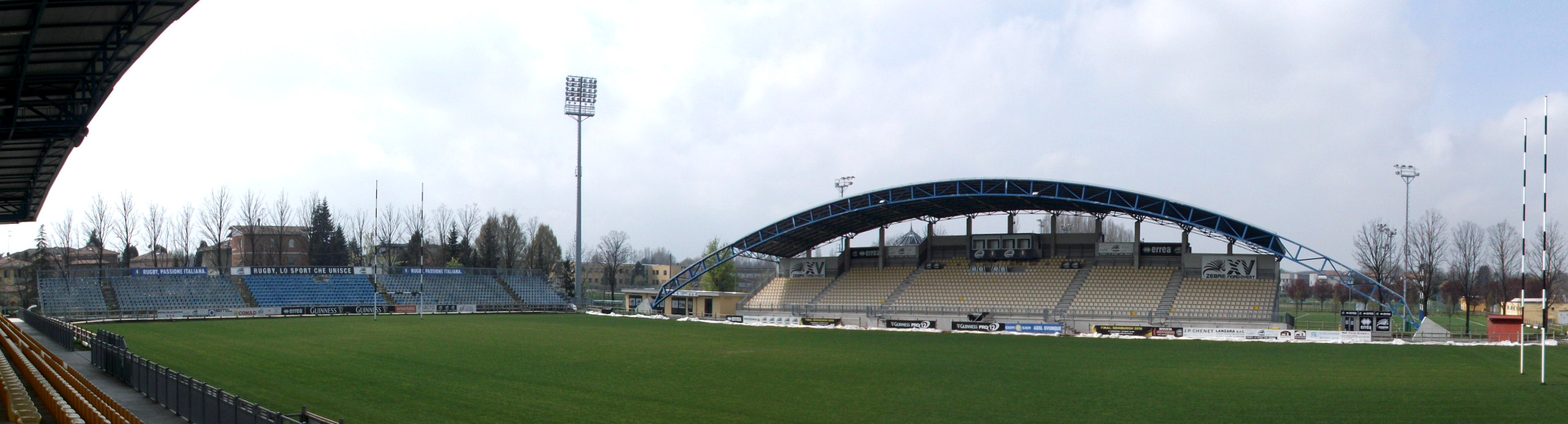
Sergio Lanfranchi panoramic view south to west
