= Catania Elephants =

Professional American football team in Catania, Sicily, Italy

Elephants
- Established: 1984
- Based in: Catania
- Home stadium: Santa Maria Goretti
- Head coach: Renato Gargiulo
- General manager: Gianmarco Pecoraro
- League: LeNAF (II Div)

Current uniform
Home

Away

The Catania Elephants are a professional American football team in Catania, Italy. They played in the Italian Football League from 2008 to 2012. The Elephants reached the IFL Super Bowl Championship game in 2010 and 2012, but lost to the Parma Panthers both times. The Elephants failed to apply for the 2013 IFL season due to money issues, so the team started the 2013 season in LeNAF (II Division), another nationwide football league with no imports (only Italian Players).
