= Milano Seamen =

American football team based in Milan, Italy

Logo

General information
- Founded: 1981
- Folded: 2026
- Stadium: Velodromo Vigorelli
- Headquartered: Milan
- Colors: Navy blue, Action green, White
- Website: milanoseamen.it

Championships
- League championships: 5 IFL: 2014, 2015, 2017–2019

The Seamen Milano were an American football team based in Milan, Italy. They competed in the Italian Football League, eventually merging with the Milano Rhinos in August 2026.

== History ==
=== 80s ===
The Seamen Milano were founded by Sergio Galeotti, a shareholder of the "Giorgio Armani SpA" on October 27, 1981. In the 1980s they were one of the most successful Italian teams, collecting two Italian Super Bowl appearances in 1987 and 1989, with an overall record of 68 wins, 4 draws, and 39 defeats in 111 games played. After finishing the 1987 regular season with a record of 11–1, the Milano Seamen defeated the Giaguari Torino 49–3 in the eight-finals. Their winning streak continued after defeating the Milano Rhinos 29-6 and the Doves 20–14 in the quarter- and semi-finals respectively. Under coach Dave Ritchie they lost the 1989 Super Bowl against the Legnano Frogs 24–27, suffering a touchdown pass by the Frogs with a few seconds remaining on the game clock. Despite the loss, the team's success continued when they won the Under 20 National Championship in 1989. Eventually, the team folded in 1990.

=== Re-foundation ===
19 years following the disbandment, the team was reestablished by a group of former players in 2009. From its grassroots, the team won the Under 19 championship in 2010, in part with the multitude of athletes originating the Milano Falcons, a team that disbanded in 2009. In 2012, Joe Avezzano became the head coach of the Seamen.

=== Winning years ===
In 2010, the Seamen Milano were admitted to the Italian Football League. Since this time, the club took off, winning their first Italian Super Bowl in 2014 after beating the Parma Panthers 33–3. The team would go on to win four more championships before going on hiatus due to the COVID-19 pandemic. Following their return in 2021, they lost against the Parma Panthers in the championship 34–40. In 2022, the team made it back to the championship, only to lose to Guelfi Firenze 17–21.

=== International competitions ===
In November 2019, the club participated in its first international competition, the Central European Football League. Despite coming last in their group, the Seamen lasted in the league for two more seasons before departing.

In April 2022, the Seamen announced their entry into the European League of Football after negotiations with the national association were successful. Following this, the stadium, head coach and general manager of the club were confirmed. However, back-to-back seasons with losing records forced their hand, with the team withdrawing from the league in 2024. Although originally planning to return in 2026, the league later disbanded following the 2025 season.

Beside this, the organization participated in the IFL, being in cooperation with the Legnano Frogs for developing young players.

=== Season-by-season ===
Season	Head coach	Regular season					Postseason			
Season	Head coach	Won	Lost	Ties	Win %	Finish	Won	Lost	Win %	Result
2023	Stefan Pokorny	2	10	0	.166	5th in Central				
2024	Stefan Pokorny	4	8	0	.333	4th in Central				

=== Merger ===
On 10 August 2026, the Seamen announced their merger with the Milano Rhinos, a complete unification of both their senior, youth, and flag-football programs. Spearheaded by Justin Pugh, the clubs' names were retired, while the new Milano team's colors and jerseys will be revealed in the near future. On 20 November 2026, their new identity was unveiled as the Dukes Milano.

== Stadium ==
After renovations at Velodromo Vigorelli ended in 2018, the Milano Seamen played their home games there, following their brief experience at Stadio Breda in Sesto San Giovanni, Milan. The stadium features an artificial turf and endzones in the color of the franchise.

== Youth team ==
Seamen's Youth Sector was one of the best youth teams of the country. During the 2019–2020 season, the Under 19 team reached the national final, in which they beat Giaguari Torino 8–6.

== Honours ==
- Italian Bowl
  - Champions: (5) 2014, 2015, 2017–2019

=== Notable player and coaches ===
- Dave Ritchie – Defensive coordinator 1989
- Joe Avezzano – Head coach 2011–2012
- Jonathan Dally – Quarterback 2014–2015
- Luke Zahradka – Quarterback 2017–2023
- Giorgio Tavecchio – Kicker 2023–Present
- Jordan Bouah – Wide receiver 2020–2021
- Jon Gruden – Advisor 2024
