= Pesaro Angels =

From 1982 to 1993 the Pesaro Angels American football team helped pioneer American football in Italy and the Italian Football League. The team was rebuilt in 2006.

== History ==
Playing within the A.I.F.A. and F.I.A.F. leagues the team reached two Super Bowls, five semifinals, and numerous playoff appearances in the series A-1 and Under 21 football championships.

Maurizio Terenzi founded the team in 1981 and, thanks to his mix of management and entrepreneurial expertise, was able to create a strong team during the pioneering days of American football in Italy. He hired Jerry Douglas, a.k.a. "The Iron Sergeant", as the team's first and most prolific coach. Douglas took a group of young men who had never played the game of football before and turned them into extraordinary athletes who achieved great success by going to two Super Bowls and appearing in several playoff games. The Angels gave Pesaro a newfound prestige across Italy.

A team of the same name was re-established in 2006. Since 2009 it has played in the Italian Federation of American football (FIDAF), in the National League of American football (LENAF), Central Division.
