= Parma Panthers =

Italian-based American football team

Logo

General information
- Founded: 1981
- Stadium: Stadio Ennio Tardini
- Headquartered: Parma

Personnel
- General manager: Ugo Bonvicini
- Head coach: Brian Michitti

League / conference affiliations
- Italian Football League

Championships
- League championships: 0; 7 (2010, 2011, 2012, 2013, 2021, 2023, 2024)

Current uniform
Home

Away

The Parma Panthers are an American football team based in Parma, Italy that competes in the Italian Football League. The team was founded in 1981 by Vic Dasaro, an American veterinary student attending university in Parma.

Dasaro created the team from an amalgam of power lifters from a local high school gym, ex-rugby players, other vet students, and a mixed bunch of soccer goalies, track and field athletes, and local kids who had seen football on the occasional TV broadcast and liked the helmet and shoulderpad look. The team is now built on longtime IFL veterans and young players from the Panthers' own youth teams, with still a healthy contingent of University of Parma students.

In 2010, 2011, 2012, 2013, 2021 and 2023 the Panthers won the IFL championship by beating respectively Catania Elephants, Bergamo Lions, Catania Elephants, and Milano Seamen. In 2021 they won their fifth title.

== Italian Bowl USA ==
In 2023 the Panthers won the Italian Bowl played in the Glass Bowl in Toledo, Ohio USA. The first ever Italian Bowl played outside Italy was well received by the Americans, as 10,000 fans attended the game. It was also shown on regional television in the USA. The final score was Panthers 29–13 over Firenze Guelfi.

== Recent team history ==
2004 - After their inaugural year in Serie B (second highest level league in Italy), the Panthers win the Silver League title in just their second season. On July 3, in the presence of the beautiful stadium Ridolfi of Florence, the Panthers went against the Elephants of Catania. The season started unsteady due to delays in preparation, but thanks to the arrival of American coach Bill Piner, assisted by coach Joe Knoll, the team would go on a six-game winning streak. All of their hard work would earn the Panthers a victory in the final. For his excellent performance, Renato Costi was voted as the best QB in the Serie B league, and his brother Dario was voted best receiver and KOR. Mattia Marino leader on special teams and defense was also recognized for his play along with Luca Scurria, Nicola Palmia, Gian Luca Ferrari, Rasheed Shittu and Captain Alberto Lanzoni. All of these players were voted among the best in their individual positions. The hero of the title game was Luca Marchesi.

2005 The Panthers are back in the top flight of the Italian Football League in the (Golden League or Serie A), and returned after 12 years to the historic Stadium "Cervi" (now Stadio Sergio Lanfranchi). LB Onyeka Ossai and the American import RB/SS Andrew Papoccia (reappointed for the 2006 season, ed.), are the two foreigners in the starting lineup. The season, however, is marked by injuries to the Americans, leaving only Italian players. In spite of this, the Panthers are able to compete in league play. With a record of 2-6 (Victories against the Hogs), the season ends with promise. Players worth noting are Lanzoni, Scurria and Rasheed Shittu for the defense and Menozzi, Gennari, Antonetti and G. Ferrari on offense.

2006 - The 2006 season starts with a variation to the rule concerning American players. Any team is allowed up to five American players on their active roster and up to three American players on the field at any given time. After analyzing the athletes available the team and the Governing Body looked at the 2006 season as one aimed at survival. Andrew Papoccia had the task of interviewing and selecting staff from Member States, and the team began to work to provide what was necessary to allow the athletes to train and play in the best possible conditions. As for the situation of the coaching staff, Andrew selected Borchini and Tedeschi as offensive and defensive coordinators. Finding good knowledgeable coaches has been a problem in Parma and for the other teams spread throughout Italy. Parma exempts Coach Blackwelder. The Panthers welcome their four new and one returning import Americans to Parma. Quarterback Mike Souza, Safety Tyler Larick, Andrew Papoccia all from Illinois State University, and Tight End Luke Seely from Southwestern College, are joined shortly after by WR/CB Craig McIntyre from Eastern Washington University. With Andrew Papoccia returning to the United States for family commitments on a few occasions, the Panthers hired Running Back Eddie Pricolo from Sacred Heart University. The complete package of Americans would be referred to as the "Fab Six". In June, to try to reach the playoffs, Parma brings back Coach Piner, who substantially contributes to the success achieved by the team. After beating the Bozano Giants at home, with the support of more than 50 Panthers from past team, the Panthers open the doors of the Super Bowl for the first time in team history. In Scandiano, province of Reggio Emilia, the Panthers saw their incredible journey fall short at the hands of the Bergamo Lions, who defeated the Panthers 24 to 12 on their way to the Lions 10th national title.

2007 - Starting the season as last year's runners up, the Panthers had to deal with some key losses before the season even started. Both of the Costi brothers hang up their cleats and are soon followed by Zambelloni and Shittu, while Andrew Papoccia is sworn in as the new head coach. The team, however, is strengthened by the arrival of Maschi, Polenghi, Ummarino and Menozzi on offense, and Papasodero on defense. League rules only permit two American players on the field at the same time and the team is surprised by the return of Souza and McIntyre. The 2007 season starts off with a bang. First the Panthers got a mercy rule win at Napoli and follow it up with a win against the Dolphins. Parma then goes on to lose in the last minute against the Giants and their game against the Warriors is one for playoff position. The game is won in the second overtime and it's off to Rome with first place in the standings locked up. The Marines are a solid team, and the season favorites are able to defeat the Panthers. An injury to McIntyre forces Papoccia to play against the Rhinos, where the Italian-American ace excelled in rushing, receiving and returning kicks. A Panther's landslide victory is a historic accomplishment and means Parma is third place going into the playoffs. The playoffs would be against the winner of A2, but the Hogs were full of injuries and had to deal with several players leaving the team. They forfeit the game and the Panthers are automatically in the semifinals against the Marines. This time Souza and his fellow Panthers do not repeat their errors from their previous game against the Marines. Parma's victory brings the team back to the Super Bowl. Gavesi is signed before the game, a young rookie who is not only a talented receiver, but is a fool proof field goal kicker, which makes all the difference at this point of the season. The final in Scandiano is a repeat of the previous year: Panthers vs Lions. The final is a game of beauty and cannot be determined within regulation. It would take until the second overtime for the pluricampioni of Bergamo to win with a score of 55 to 49. The Panthers held the lead almost the entire game and had nothing to feel down about by the time of the final whistle. Writer John Grisham was in the stands, author the book "Playing for Pizza", which is based on the Parma Panthers. Aristide De Pascalis and Marco Tunnera are the two MVP's of the season and give the team hope for a promising future. The 2007 season marks the arrival of the Parma Panthers in the IFL, and possibly even on the European scene.

2008 - After two seasons, the Panthers replaced the American duo of Souza-McIntyre. To do so, the Panthers sign from Harvard University QB Danny Brown (later replaced by Thomas Zetts due to injury), WR Corey Mazza and RB/LB Ryan Tully. The Panther's season debut is against the Lions, the defending champions of Italy. The presence of John Grisham brings national notoriety since, Grisham is both an author and has links to television. After the first 3 games, the Panthers find themselves with a record of 1-2. With 7 consecutive victories, the Panthers fail to close in on the leaders and end the season in third place entering the play-offs. The semi-final sees the black-silver in a rematch against the Lions, and once again the ending is bitter. With the Panthers only a few minutes from victory, they see their chances at the final fade away. 2008 is also the first time the Panthers participate in a European competition, with a series of performances that make the case for them to be in the final of the EFAF Cup. In Berlin, the Panthers lose to host Adler but are proud to have reached this milestone. Lastly, the season ends with a farewell to the Lanfranchi stadium, with the Panthers moving to the new XXV Aprile Stadium.

2009 - The American trio signed for this season is made up of Ryan Tully, the return of Craig McIntyre and the arrival of QB Joe Craddock from Middle Tennessee State. The team also sees the debut of young Michele Canali (DE), Alessandro Canali (DB) (whose season unfortunately ends prematurely due to injury on the first day), Nicola Francani (CB) and Matteo Grigolo (WR). The seasons starts with the Panthers imposing its will on the Hogs and the Lions (with black-silver becoming authors of a sensational comeback, recovering from 7-26 to win 30-26). After losing to the Marines, the Panthers have back-to-back victories over the Doves and Dolphins. The Panthers go on Easter Saturday to Bolzano, to face the league leading Giants. Incredibly, with less than two minutes left the game is tied with a score of 28-28. With time winding down, Parma scores the go ahead touchdown to go up 35-28. Bolzano does not give up, and with 14 seconds left the Giants manage to score a TD to bring them within one point. The Giants do not attempt the extra point to tie, but opt to go for the 2-point conversion, which will be repeated twice because of penalties. At the end, the Giants successfully convert the 2-points conversion, putting them ahead of Parma 36-35. Parma performs the miracle however, and makes a field goal at the end of regulation and establishes themselves as the owners of the top spot. Many injuries were suffered however, and would lead the Panthers to be defeated against the Rhinos and the Elephants. With a final win against the Warriors, the Panthers were headed to a play-off game against the Marines. They would next play Ostia in the semifinal, where the two teams would fight for every point. A couple of turnovers would see the Panthers fall to Ostia by a score of 42-40. In European play, the Panthers cannot overcome the group stage, finishing with a victory and a defeat. The season also sees the appendix of the European championship in group B, in which the Italian team took fourth place. Among the 40 player squad, three players from the black-silver would stand out: Tommaso Antonetti (OT, national team captain), Michele Canali (DE) and Tommaso Monardi (QB, author of a thrilling performance in the final for the third-fourth place).

2010 - After 2 seasons, Ryan Tully leaves the Panthers and is replaced by LB/RB Greg Hay, while Craddock and McIntyre state that they sign with Parma for another year. The roster also sees the addition of several young players, including several from the youth teams, and others from the Bobcats of Parma and Drunken Irishmen of Massa. The team showcases tremendous talent and team spirit, supported by a perfect mix of rookies and veterans. With a run of 7 consecutive victories, the Panthers would receive a first round bye to the semi-finals in the playoffs. With the Americans resting for the playoffs, the Panthers would stumble and suffer their only defeat in the league play, finishing with a record of 7-1. Their semifinal opponent the Giants, are the previous year's Italian Champions. After a traumatic start (down 14-0 in the first few minutes), the Panthers came back to win (21-20), and punched their ticket for a third Super Bowl appearance in 5 years. In the Super Bowl the Panthers would have a rematch against the Elephants, the only team to beat them in regular season. The black-silver start strong, jumping out to a lead of 35-0 by the second quarter. But taking advantage of mistakes made by Parma, the Elephants mount their comeback (35-26) midway through the third quarter. The Panthers attack was led by the phenomenal play of Joe Craddock, and the offense finds their rhythm that had been so excellent throughout the regular season. At the same time the defense goes back to being an impenetrable wall. The Panthers stretch their lead to 56-26, sailing towards their first title. The MVP of the game was Greg Hay, while Michele Canali is named the game's Defensive MVP. Kicker Andrea Vergazzoli won the title of Best Kicker for the season. Parma also boasted national player recognition for Tommaso Antonetti (RT), Enrico Bergonzani (TE), Michele Canali (DE), Matteo Ferrari (C), Nicola Francani (CB), Michele Fumarola (CB), Nicola Gasparri (WR), Tommaso Monardi (QB), Francesco Vasini (DB) and Andrea Vergazzoli (K).

2011 - The Panthers signed three American athletes: running back Jaycen Taylor Spears (Purdue University), wide receiver Tanyon Bissell (Boise State) and defensive back Nate Lyles (University of Virginia). The Italian QB Tommaso Monardi, who played in the national under-21 team as a quarterback, was appointed as a starter, thus becoming the first Italian starting quarterback in the history of the European Football League. The defense got defensive tackle Diego Gennaro, captain of the national team and a member of the Bolzano Giants. In the Kick Off Classic, the Panthers were defeated by the Catania Elephants with the result of 54-51. After that, the Panthers won three straight games against the Doves, Dolphins, and Giants and then lost to the Warriors of Bologna. After that, the Panthers won three more consecutive games against the Marines, Rhinos, and Seamen, having finished the regular season on the second place. In the playoffs, the Panthers defeated the Elephants in the semifinal and the Warriors in the final of the Italian Super Bowl in the XXV Aprile Stadium, winning the Italian Championship again. Bissell was the winner of the game MVP award, Monardi got the best Italian player award, while the defensive end Michele Canali won the best defensive lineman award. Monardi threw 108 passes out of 169 for 1,400 yards, 26 touchdowns, and two interceptions, while Canali made 17.5 sacks. The Panthers team lost in the group round of Eurobowl after winning against the Spanish Pioneers and losing to the Swiss Calanda Broncos team.

2012 - The team welcomed two new Americans: Kevin Grayson (WR) and Tyrell Sales (LB), while RB Jaycen Taylor Spears returned to the team for another season. During the season, the Panthers suffered only two defeats, the first against the Giants of Bolzano in week 2, and then against the Catania Elephants in week 6. They finished the season in second place, behind the Catania Elephants. The Super Bowl was played in Varese, which is neutral site between the two teams. The Panthers were triumphant by a score of 61 to 43, leading to the Panthers third consecutive Italian Football League championship. The MVP of the game was awarded to WR Kevin Grayson.

2013 - Bringing in three new Americans for the 2013 campaign, the Panthers welcome Jared Karstetter (WR/DB), Ryan Christian (RB/DB), and Ben Johnson (LB/TE). With a strong core that had been mostly together for a few years and as many championships, the Panthers looked to continue their dominance of the IFL. With an offense led by QB Tommaso Monardi and a slew of veteran playmakers, and a defense anchored by veteran linemen and defensive backs, the squad entered the regular season with confidence. Dismayed only by a solitary Week 4 loss to the Ancona Dolphins, 20-28, the Panthers cruised through the rest of the regular season and entered the playoffs with a first round bye. The semifinal matchup was, of course, against the only team to beat the Panthers in regular season play, the Ancona Dolphins. This time around, the Panthers high-powered offense and suffocating defense submerged and drowned the Dolphins by a score of 34-16. The final game of the season, the IFL Super Bowl, would match up the Panthers and a team they had already beaten twice, the Milan Seamen. While the game was initially back-and-forth and competitive, like so many other times in 2013, the Panthers eventually ran away with it for a final score of 51-28 and a 4th consecutive IFL title.

== Import rules in Italy ==
Since the beginning of the Italian football league in 1980, the American import rule has changed periodically. Many seasons the rule in the Italian Football League (highest level league) has allowed five American passport players on the roster and only three on the field at the same time. In 2012, the number of Americans imports on the field at the same time was decreased to 2.

Dual Italian / American citizens or double passport players are highly coveted as they are considered as Italian national players and do not count against the American import set rule. European imports are allowed, the number allowed has also changed at different times. Most of the leagues teams are made up of Italian born national players.

These import rules are similar throughout most European American football leagues. Limiting the number of professional import players is done to help the development of national players in European countries and leagues.

== In popular culture ==
Playing for Pizza is a novel by John Grisham about a quarterback who signs for Parma after being blamed for the defeat of the Cleveland Browns in the AFC Championship game.

== Roster 2020 ==
Number	Player name	Position	Year	Provenience
12	Hennessey Reilly	QB	25/11/1995	Central Washington University
99	Monardi Tommaso	QB	31/10/1990	
26	Gatti Marco	RB	12/02/2002	
33	Malpeli Avalli Alessandro	RB	08/10/1990	
4	Pooda Modeste	RB	29/03/1997	
17	Toscano Mauro	RB	11/02/2001	
20	Simone Alinovi	WR	05/11/1997	
18	Ampomah Silvester	WR	06/07/1997	
85	Barbuti Marco	WR	12/04/1994	
80	Bonzanni Matteo	WR	15/11/1995	Bergamo Lions
14	Brambilla Riccardo	WR	24/11/1992	Bergamo Lions
6	Finadri Tommaso	WR	29/10/1982	
81	Mboup Ndjaga	WR	24/09/1995	
11	Polidori Giorgio	WR	26/08/1987	
88	Zatti Dario	WR	03/04/1999	
72	Bianchi Michele	OL	27/10/1994	
70	GIacometti Pasquale	OL	09/09/1985	Bolzano Giants
64	Guye Abib	OL	06/10/1995	
76	Mattarei Cristian	OL	11/03/1982	
51	Menozzi Francesco	OL	17/01/1995	
59	Orrù Stefano	OL	10/08/1986	
69	Pedrotti Franco	OL	31/03/1989	
63	Penini Mattia	OL	24/11/2000	
79	Rampini Vincenzo	OL	12/07/1988	
71	Valota Damiano	OL	26/11/1992	Bolzano Giants
52	Belli Vanni	DL	06/09/1984	
91	Enchill Bryan	DL	18/06/1999	Piacenza Wolverines
93	Grossi Gianmarco	DL	24/09/1993	
94	Mazzanti Edoardo	DL	06/12/1998	Firenze Guelfi
30	Niang Oumar	DL	06/10/1996	
8	Viviani Elia	DL	20/04/1993	Verona Mastini
25	Bernazzoli Alessandro	LB	25/03/2000	
34	Brianti Andrea	LB	22/08/1998	
-	Carboni Lorenzo	LB	03/01/1993	
21	Erioldi Alex	LB	07/12/1988	
50	Froldi Matteo	LB	22/05/1995	
28	Leone Marcello	LB	09/06/1999	
47	Lombardi Marco Aurelio	LB	29/09/2001	
3	Bozzini Pier Paolo	DB	03/09/1987	Verona Mastini
9	Brees Mitchell	DB	26/07/1996	Illinois State University
23	Diaferia Francesco	DB	27/05/1989	
31	Fanunza Michael	DB	25/02/1995	Piacenza Wolverines
24	Leone Michelangelo	DB	28/01/1995	
2	Passeri Ivan	DB	18/03/2001	
32	Rodriguez Alejandro	DB	25/11/1996	
5	Roncai Erik	DB	24/04/2002	
40	Rossi Federico	DB	08/12/1990	
22	Spaggiari Massimiliano	DB	07/09/1991	
13	Sterns Jordan	DB	28/05/1994	Oklahoma State University
27	Vasini Francesco	DB	21/10/1989	
10	Felli Matteo	K	15/08/1988	

=== 2020 coaching staff ===
Position	Coach	Provenience
Head coach	Miller Brad	USA
Offensive coordinator	Price James	USA
Defensive coordinator	Miller Brad	USA
QB coach	Rossi Giovanni	Italy
WR coach	Baci Sandrino	Italy
RB coach	Zatti Massimiliano	Italy
OL coach	Toscano Alberto	Italy
DL coach	Tedeschi Renato	Italy
DB coach	Montaresi David	Italy
Assistant coach USA	Durham Kristopher Michael	USA
Assistant coach	Ferraro Vincenzo	Italy
