= Rhinos Milano =

American football team based in Milan, Italy

Milano Rhinos

General information
- Founded: 1975
- Folded: 2026
- Stadium: Velodromo Vigorelli
- Headquartered: Milan
- Website: https://www.rhinos.it

Championships
- League championships: 5 IFL: 1981–1983, 1990, 2016

Uniform
Home

Away

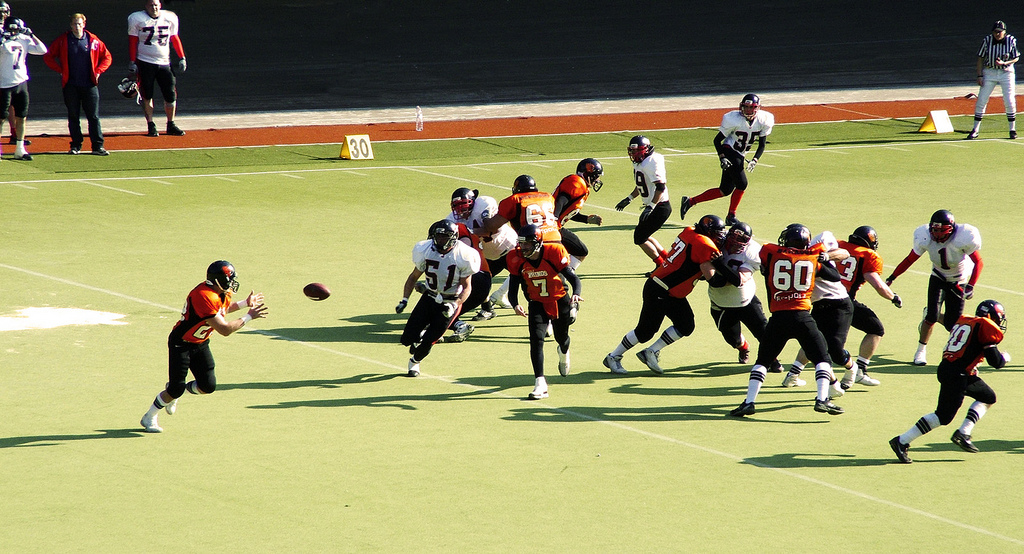

The Rhinos Milano were an American football team based in Milan, Italy. The team was founded in 1975, becoming the first American football team in Italy. The Rhinos played in the Italian Football League the highest level league in Italy.

== History ==
The team was founded as Pantere Rosa di Piacenza in 1975. In 1978, the Rhinos played in the first game between two Italian teams, where they defeated the Busto Arsizio Frogs. The 2016 season saw the Rhinos win all of their 13 games to complete a perfect season.

On 10 August 2026, the Rhinos announced their merger with the Milano Seamen, a complete unification of both their senior, youth, and flag-football programs. Spearheaded by Justin Pugh, the clubs' names were retired, while the new Milano team's colors and jerseys will be revealed in the near future. On 20 November 2026, their new identity was unveiled as the Dukes Milano.

== Seasons ==
- 1978 June 25 Rhinos Milano-Frogs Busto Arsizio 34–0 First American football game between two Italian teams
- 1979–80 First team able to play at the Nato bases' tournament
- 1981 Serie A Italian Champions (record 9-0) (vs Frogs Gallarate 24–8)
- 1982 Serie A Italian Champions Division Center (record 11-1) (vs Frogs Gallarate 11–0)
- 1983 Serie A Italian Champions Division West (record 13-0) (vs Warriors Bologna 20–14)
- 1984 Serie A 4° place Division North (record 4-2-4)
- 1985 Serie A 3° place Division East (record 8-1-5) Quarter finals (@ Panthers Parma 14–24) Under 20 Italian Champions
- 1986 Serie A 2° place Division West (record 9-1-3) Semifinals (@ Angels Pesaro 0–10)
- 1987 Serie A 2° place Division B (record 11-3) Quarter finals (@ Seamen Milano 7–29)
- 1988 Serie A 1° place Division Center (record 13-2) Semifinals (vs Warriors Bologna 13–20)
- 1989 Serie A 4° place Division A (record 10-4) Quarter finals (@ Chiefs Ravenna 13–14)
- 1990 Serie A Italian Champions (record 14-1) (vs Frogs Legnano 33–6)
- 1991-93 didn't play any game
- 1994 Serie A 1° place Division B (record 9-1-2) made the Superbowl (vs Frogs Legnano 27–37)
- 1995 Serie A 3° place Division B (record 6-1-6) Quarter finals (@ Phoenix Bologna 14–32)
- 1996 Serie A 5° place Division A (record 3-9)
- 1997 Serie A 3° place Division West (record 4-7) Wild Card (@ Bergamo Lions 13–21)
- 1998 Serie A 3° place Division B (record 2-8)
- 1999-2001 didn't play any game
- 2002 Serie C (Fivemen) 5° place (record 0-8)
- 2003 Serie C - NWC 1° place (record 8-1) NWC BOWL Champions (vs Chargers Novi Ligure 35–12)
- 2004 Serie C - NWC 1° place Girone A (record 5-3) made the NWC BOWL (vs Red Jackets Sarzana 7–22)
- 2005 Serie B - 4° place Division North (record 3-5) Quarter finals (@ Guelfi Firenze 0–25)
- 2006 Serie A2 - 2° place Division NorthWestern (record 8-2) (5° place Sauceda National Ranking) Semifinals (@ Hogs Reggio Emilia 0-42)
- 2007 Serie A1 - 6° place (record 2–6)
- 2008 IFL (Italian Football League) - 5° place (record 4–6)
- 2009 IFL (Italian Football League) - 5° place (record 4–5)
- 2010 IFL (Italian Football League) - 6° place (record 4–4)
- 2011 IFL (Italian Football League) - 4° place (record 5–4)
- 2012 IFL (Italian Football League) - 5° place (record 8–3)
- 2013 IFL (Italian Football League) - 7° place (record 2–6)
- 2014 IFL (Italian Football League) - 7° place (record 5–5)
- 2015 IFL (Italian Football League) - 7° place (record 5–5)
- 2016 IFL (Italian Football League) - 1° place (record 13–0) Italian Champions (vs Giants Bolzano 44–18)
- 2017 IFL (Italian Football League) - 2° place (record 12–1) made the Superbowl (vs Seamen Milano 29–37)
- 2018 IFL (Italian Football League) - 6° place (record 4–6)
- 2019 II Division (IFL2) - 1st place (record 10-0) Silver Bowl Champions (vs Pretoriani Roma 24-21)
- 2020 IFL (Italian Football League) - Championship not played due to covid
- 2021 IFL (Italian Football League) - 7° place (record 1–7)
- 2022 IFL (Italian Football League) - 8° place (record 2–6)
- 2023 IFL (Italian Football League) - 4° place (record 4–4)
- 2024 IFL (Italian Football League) - 7° place (record 2–6)
- 2025 IFL (Italian Football League) - 4° place group A (record 4–6)

== Roster 2025 ==
Number	Player	Position	Year
2	McCray Marquez	QB	2000
2	Sinfi Jacopo	S	2004
4	Modeste Poda	RB	1997
6	Facino Lorenzo	RB	1992
7	Faoro Alessandro	DL	1997
9	Schina Sebastian	WR	2003
10	Cambrisi Leonardo	CB	2001
11	Escobar Bruno	WR/P	2000
12	Malinverno Ascanio	WR	2003
13	Boni Simone	WR	2000
14	Seck Tamsir	WR	1996
15	Brambilla Riccardo	WR	1992
16	Myhre Jaden	WR	2002
18	Segrini Alessio	WR	2002
19	Bertocchi Luca	WR	1998
21	Bertazzi Andrea	S	1996
25	Ricco Lorenzo	CB	1992
26	Olivas Marco	LB	2000
27	Franzosi Marco	CB	2004
28	Clarke Morris	CB	2000
29	Paganini Gabriele	WR	2001
30	Piazzoli Simone	LB	2003
31	Restelli Riccardo	CB	2000
33	Villa Federico	CB	2004
44	Nsowah Rendy	LB	2000
45	Di Paolo Fabrizio	LB	1996
47	Sarra Giacomo	K	2001
53	Mauro Sacha	OL	1997
55	Suppa Nikolas	LB	1995
56	Guillet Riccardo	OL	2000
61	Caiazzo Giorgio	OL	2005
62	Balestra Nicolay	OL	2005
64	Proietti Dino	OL	2005
66	Todisco Dario	OL	1990
67	Khayati Davide	DL	1993
68	Simeoni Jacopo	OL	2002
69	Minaudo Luigi	DL	1987
73	Mosconi Giorgio	OL	2006
74	Yamashita Luca	OL	2007
75	Barbotti Federico	OL	2000
79	Matombe Jude	OL	2001
82	Bouah Jordan	WR	1995
84	Guillet Ruggero	TE	1998
92	Ongari Filippo	DL	2000
96	Minelli Riccardo	LB	2005
97	Giuliani Destiny	DL	1996
99	Mauri Guglielmo	DL	1999

== Coaching Staff 2025 ==
POSITION	NAME
Head Coach/Offensive Coordinator	Luca Lorandi
Defensive Coordinator	Chuck Howthorne
OL Coach	Marco Massironi
RB Coach	Francesco Righetti
WR Coach	Antonio Monza
DB Coach	Avi Barth
LB Coach	Carlalberto Capelli
DL/ST Coach	Jack Gibson
LB Coach	Massimo Coculo
