= Bergamo Lions =

American football team from Bergamo, Italy

Lions
- Established: 1983
- Based in: Bergamo
- Home stadium: Via Monte Gleno snc, Lions Field - Bergamo (BG)
- League: Italian Football League

Personnel
- Head coach: Doug Cosbie
- General manager: Paolo Pezzotta
- Team president: Ambrogio Petrone

Championships
- League titles (0): 12 (1 in the IFL era)

Current uniform
Home

Away

The Bergamo Lions are an American football team from Bergamo, Italy established in 1983 and playing in the Italian Football League. They won the Eurobowl in 2000, 2001 and 2002, while losing to the Vienna Vikings in the finals of 2004 and 2005 Eurobowl. In Italy, the Lions have won the Italian league championship more than any other team 12 times. The Lions last Italian Championship was won in the 2008 season.

The Lions sign and pay American and Canadian professional import players to play for the team alongside Italian players and European import teammates. A few examples are former New England Patriots running back Scott Lockwood who played for the Lions 1994-1996, former Houston Texans QB Bradlee Van Pelt 2009-2010, and Kansas City Chiefs wide receiver Jeris McIntyre. As well as Canadian Football League players such as running back Tyrone Rush and QB Dan Crowley The Lions have also recruited and signed many American coaches, such as Adam Rita, John Rosenberg as head coach and Brian Baldinger as their offensive line coach.

== Championships ==
- 12 Superbowl Italiano (Italian championship): 1993, 1998, 1999, 2000, 2001, 2002, 2003, 2004, 2005, 2006, 2007, 2008.
- 3 Eurobowl (European championship): 2000, 2001, 2002.
- 1 Champions League: 2000.
