= Italian Football League =

Italian American football league

- Classification: Top level league
- Sport: American football
- Founded: 1978; 48 years ago
- First season: 1980
- CEO: Enrico Mambelli
- Commissioner: Justin Pugh
- No. of teams: Max 12
- Country: Italy
- Most recent champions: Guelfi Firenze (2nd title) (2025)
- Most titles: Bergamo Lions (12 titles)
- Level on pyramid: Level 1
- Website: www.fidaf.com

Italian Football League (IFL; the name is in English) is the top level American football league in Italy first established in 1978. The first recognized league champion was crowned in 1980.

The annual final playoff game to determine the league champion is called the Italian Bowl, that awards, for American football, the title of "champion of Italy" and the scudetto.

== Background ==
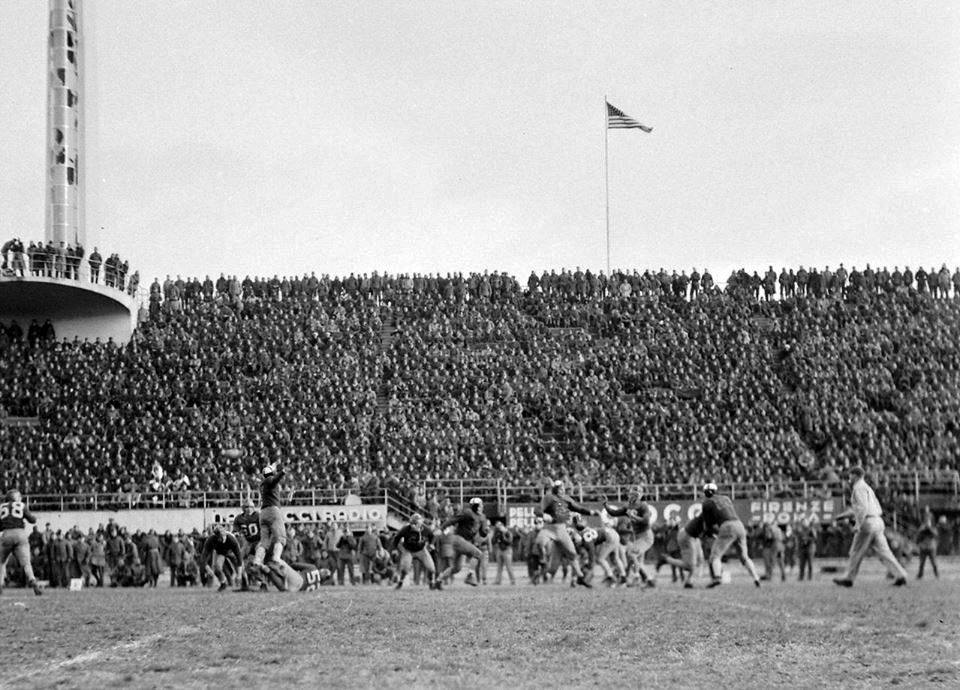
Spaghetti Bowl, American football bowl game played in Florence, Italy, on 1 January 1945

In Italy, the first American football game took place in Genoa on 27 November 1913 when the teams of the USS Connecticut and USS Kansas faced each other, two of the 14 ships of the American Great White Fleet temporarily docked in the Ligurian port during an exercise cruise in the Mediterranean Sea. USS Connecticut won 17–6.

After this sporadic appearance, American football returned to Italy with the Allied troops during World War II. American football followed the advance of the US units from the south to the north of the Italian peninsula. On 23 November 1944, a touch football match was played at the Stadio della Vittoria in Bari, between the Playboys and the Technical School. The trophy, called the "Bambino Bowl", was won by the Technical School 13–0 in front of an audience of 5,000.

A little over a month later, the Spaghetti Bowl was held in Florence in front of 25,000 people on New Year's Day 1945 between the Bridgebusters (representatives of the Twelfth Air Force) and the Mudders (United States Army North); the Mudders won 20–0. Although probably other matches were played in those years of which no documentation remains, the first in peacetime, took place in Trieste, the last territory liberated from the Nazi-Fascists, in January 1948. The match was organized by the Trieste United States Troops and saw the SP'S prevail over D Company by "three touchdowns" (then 21–0).

== History ==
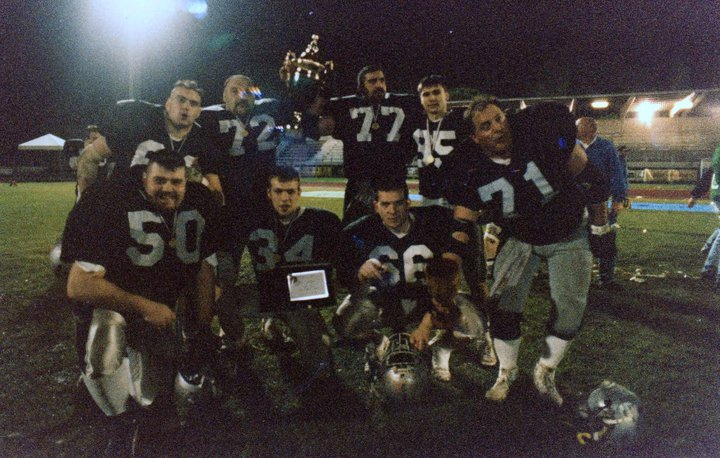
Legnano Frogs celebrate victory after winning the XV Italian Bowl in 1995

In the 1970s teams formed and played in Italy. The first American football championship organized in Italy, which was never recognized by the federation, took place in 1977 and was won by the Tori Torino.

Among the games played in the 1970s there was the first official match played between Italian American football teams in preparation for the first championship officially recognized by the federation; played on 24 June 1978 at the Stadio Carlo Speroni in Busto Arsizio, it was won 36–0 by the Rhinos Milano over the Gallarate Frogs.

In 1980 the first official American football league in Italy was established and crowned a champion. This championship did not include a final and was won by Lupi Roma. However, the title of first champions of Italy was recognized to the Lupi only in 2016.

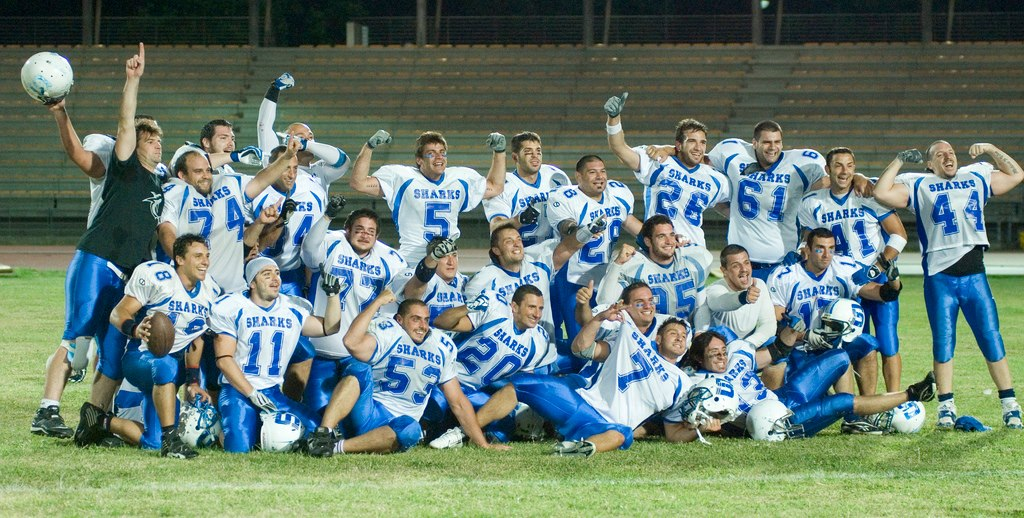
Palermo Sharks in 2008

The Italian league (Series A) in the late 1970s and early 1980s, was one of the first leagues in Europe to sign professional import players and coaches from the USA. The league had good popularity in the early years especially the late 1980s and early 1990s with reported attendance of nearly 20,000 fans for a Series A league final championship game in that time period. American Football in Italy has had ups and downs since that time but has always had a competitive league with different lower levels playing below the Italian Football League (IFL).

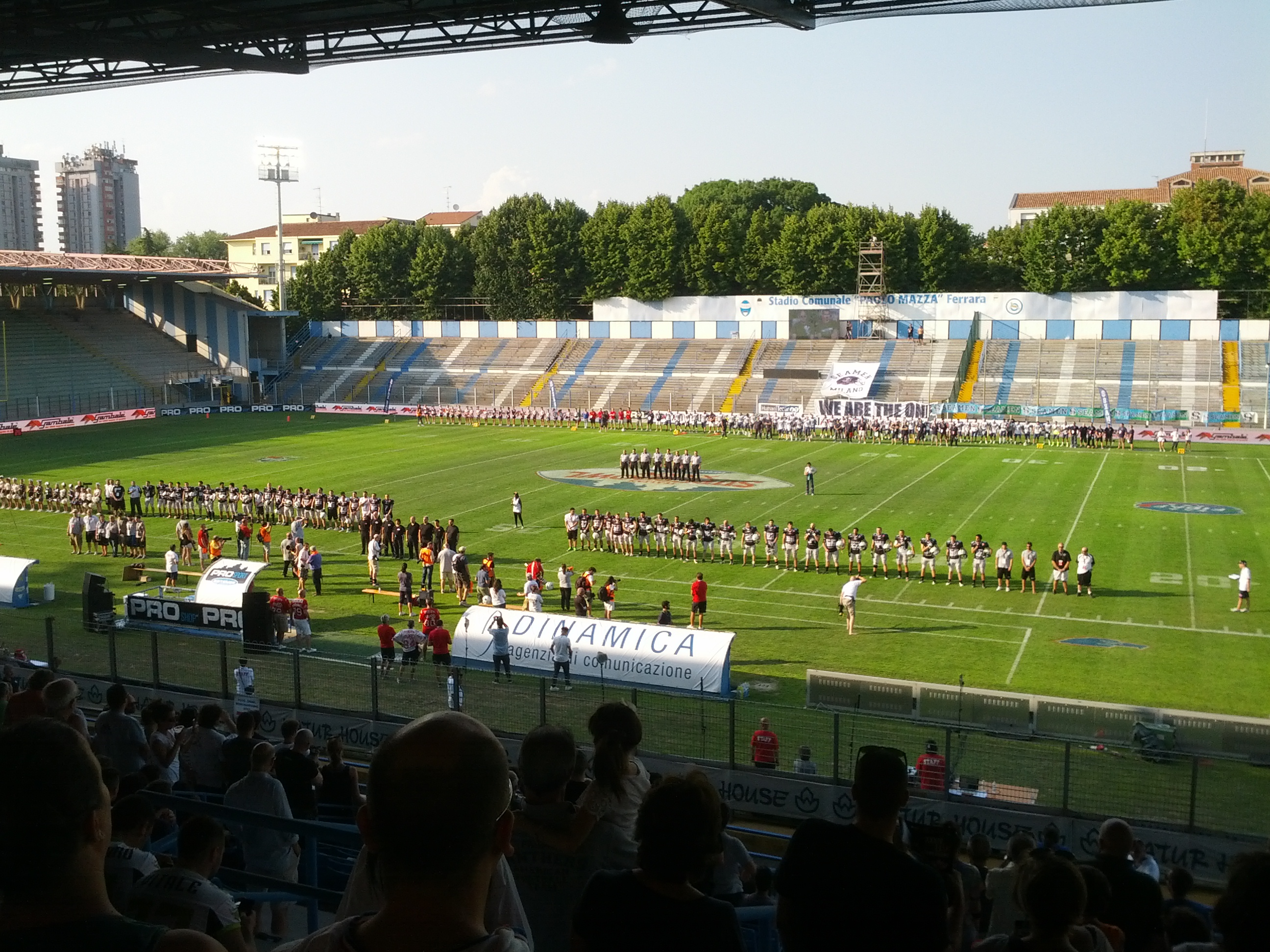
XXXIV Italian Bowl, won by Milano Seamen vs. Parma Panthers in 2014.

The new IFL was founded in 2007, taking over previous league's significance called (National Football League Italy). The league was born as a result of the escape of several of the best clubs of the old championship organized by the Italian federation, such as Milano Rhinos, Parma Panthers, Bologna Doves and Bolzano Giants. However some of the historic Italian clubs have not joined the new league and continue to participate in different tournaments organized by other federations.

In the following years a lot of teams moved to the Federazione Italiana di American Football (the federation the IFL belongs to) and most of the biggest teams are now again part of the IFL that is the First Division or in the other two divisions.

The Bergamo Lions have won the most Italian Super Bowl league championships winning 12 finals.

On Saturday, July 1, 2023, Italian Bowl XLII was played at the Glass Bowl Stadium on the campus of The University of Toledo, Toledo, Ohio, USA. This marked the first Italian Football League Championship held outside of Europe. The Parma Panthers won the game played in front of nearly 10,000 fans, and was televised in the United States.

== IFL teams ==
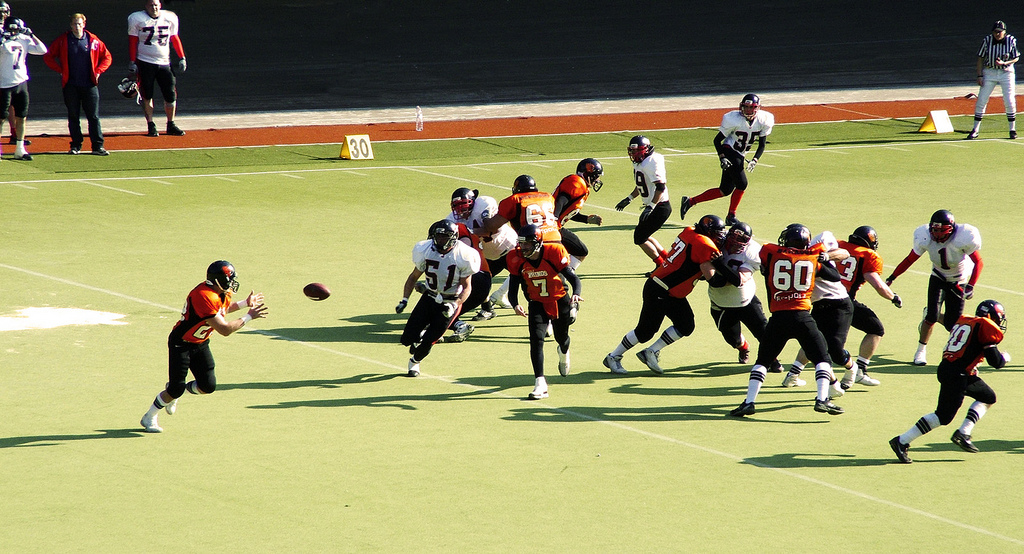
Rhinos Milano vs. Catania Elephants in 2008 at Velodromo Vigorelli, Milan

- Ancona Dolphins (2008–present)
- Bergamo Lions (2008–10, 2012, 2014–2019, 2025)
- Bologna Doves (2008–09, 2011–12) (now in III Division)
- Bologna Warriors (2009–present)
- Bolzano Giants (2008–2020)
- Catania Elephants (2008–12) (now in II Division)
- Deamons Cernusco (2012)
- Ferrara Aquile (2014–2017, 2025–present)
- Firenze Guelfi (2016–present)
- Lazio Marines (2018–present)
- Legnano Frogs (2023–present)
- Martesana Daemons (2012) (now in II Division)
- Mastini Verona (2022–2023)
- Dukes Milano (Note: Merger between the Milano Seamen and Milano Rhinos.) (2027–present)
- Milano Rhinos (2008–2018, 2020–2026 †)
- Milano Seamen (2011–2026 †)
- Napoli Briganti (2014–?) (now in III Division)
- Palermo Corsari (2008 †)
- Palermo Sharks (2008) (now in II Division)
- Parma Panthers (2008–present)
- Reggio Emilia Hogs (2009–13) (now in II Division)
- Roma Grizzlies (2015–2018) (now in II division)
- Savona Pirates (2025)
- Torino Giaguari (2014–2020, 2023–present)
- UTA Pesaro (2018)
- Varese Skorpions (2023–present)

† defunct

== Italian Bowl ==
Italian Bowl is the annual final play-off game of the Italian Football League (IFL) to determine the league champion. It is the game that awards, for American football, the title of "champion of Italy" and the scudetto. Until 2014 the championship game was called Italian Super Bowl.

The scudetto, a decoration having the colors of the flag of Italy which is sewn onto the jersey of the Italian sports clubs that won the highest level championship of their respective sport in the previous season.

Game	Year	Winner	Opponent	Result	Location
-	1980	Lupi Roma	-	Group winners	-
I	1981	Rhinos Milano	Frogs Gallarate	24–8	Stadio Eugenio Broccardi, Santa Margherita Ligure
II	1982	Rhinos Milano	Frogs Gallarate	11–0	Stadio Tonino Benelli, Pesaro
III	1983	Rhinos Milano	Warriors Bologna	20–14	Palasport di Genova, Genoa
IV	1984	Frogs Busto Arsizio	Warriors Bologna	16–6	Stadio Romeo Neri, Rimini
V	1985	Doves Bologna	Angels Pesaro	27–11	Stadio Silvio Appiani, Padua
VI	1986	Warriors Bologna	Angels Pesaro	18–8	Stadio Renato Dall'Ara, Bologna
VII	1987	Frogs Legnano	Milano Seamen	27–24	Stadio Romeo Neri, Rimini
VIII	1988	Frogs Legnano	Warriors Bologna	17–0	Stadio Dorico, Ancona
IX	1989	Frogs Legnano	Milano Seamen	39–33	Stadio Ennio Tardini, Parma
X	1990	Rhinos Milano	Frogs Legnano	33–6	Stadio Romeo Neri, Rimini
XI	1991	Giaguari Torino	Phoenix San Lazzaro	38–16	Stadio Brianteo, Monza
XII	1992	Pharaones Milano	Lions Bergamo	35–25	Stadio Druso, Bolzano
XIII	1993	Lions Bergamo	Gladiatori Roma	48–39	Stadio Comunale, Telgate
XIV	1994	Frogs Legnano	Rhinos Milano	37–27	Stadio Giovanni Mari, Legnano
XV	1995	Frogs Legnano	Gladiatori Roma	32–26	Stadio Alfiero Moretti, Cesenatico
XVI	1996	Phoenix Bologna	Gladiatori Roma	25–20	Stadio Dorico, Ancona
XVII	1997	Phoenix Bologna	Frogs Legnano	42–35	Stadio Brianteo, Monza
XVIII	1998	Lions Bergamo	Frogs Legnano	29–28	Stadio Santa Maria Goretti, Catania
XIX	1999	Lions Bergamo	Giants Bolzano	49–14	Stadio Europa, Bolzano
XX	2000	Lions Bergamo	Giants Bolzano	49–27	Velodromo Vigorelli, Milan
XXI	2001	Lions Bergamo	Dolphins Ancona	30–24	Stadio Europa, Bolzano
XXII	2002	Lions Bergamo	Dolphins Ancona	21–14	Stadio Europa, Bolzano
XXIII	2003	Lions Bergamo	Dolphins Ancona	45–0	Polisportivo Comunale, Civitanova Marche
XXIV	2004	Lions Bergamo	Dolphins Ancona	14–13	Stadio Andrea Torelli, Scandiano
XXV	2005	Lions Bergamo	Warriors Bologna	42–14	Stadio Andrea Torelli, Scandiano
XXVI	2006	Lions Bergamo	Panthers Parma	24–12	Stadio Andrea Torelli, Scandiano
XXVII	2007	Lions Bergamo	Panthers Parma	55–49 (2OT)	Stadio Andrea Torelli, Scandiano
XXVIII	2008	Lions Bergamo	Giants Bolzano	56–54	Stadio Comunale, San Giovanni in Marignano
XXIX	2009	Giants Bolzano	Marines Lazio	35–21	Stadio Dei Pini, Milano Marittima
XXX	2010	Panthers Parma	Elephants Catania	56–26	Stadio Breda, Sesto San Giovanni
XXXI	2011	Panthers Parma	Warriors Bologna	76–62	Stadio XXV Aprile, Parma
XXXII	2012	Panthers Parma	Elephants Catania	61–43	Stadio Franco Ossola, Varese
XXXIII	2013	Panthers Parma	Milano Seamen	51–28	Stadio Paolo Mazza, Ferrara
XXXIV	2014	Milano Seamen	Panthers Parma	33–3	Stadio Paolo Mazza, Ferrara
XXXV	2015	Milano Seamen	Panthers Parma	24–14	Velodromo Vigorelli, Milan
XXXVI	2016	Rhinos Milano	Giants Bolzano	44–18	Stadio Dino Manuzzi, Cesena
XXXVII	2017	Milano Seamen	Rhinos Milano	37–29	Stadio Romeo Menti, Vicenza
XXXVIII	2018	Milano Seamen	Giants Bolzano	28–14	Stadio Sergio Lanfranchi, Parma
XXXIX	2019	Milano Seamen	Firenze Guelfi	62–28	Stadio Breda, Sesto San Giovanni
-	2020	No season played because of the COVID-19 pandemic			
XL	2021	Panthers Parma	Milano Seamen	40–34 (OT)	Stadio Leonardo Garilli, Piacenza
XLI	2022	Firenze Guelfi	Milano Seamen	21–17	Stadio Renato Dall'Ara, Bologna
XLII	2023	Panthers Parma	Firenze Guelfi	29–13	Glass Bowl, Toledo, OH
XLIII	2024	Panthers Parma	Firenze Guelfi	38–26	Stadio Bruno Benelli, Ravenna
XLIV	2025	Firenze Guelfi	Dolphins Ancona	49–14	Glass Bowl, Toledo, OH
XLV	2026	Firenze Guelfi	Panthers Parma	53–43	Stadio Paolo Mazza, Ferrara

=== Number of Italian Bowl victories ===
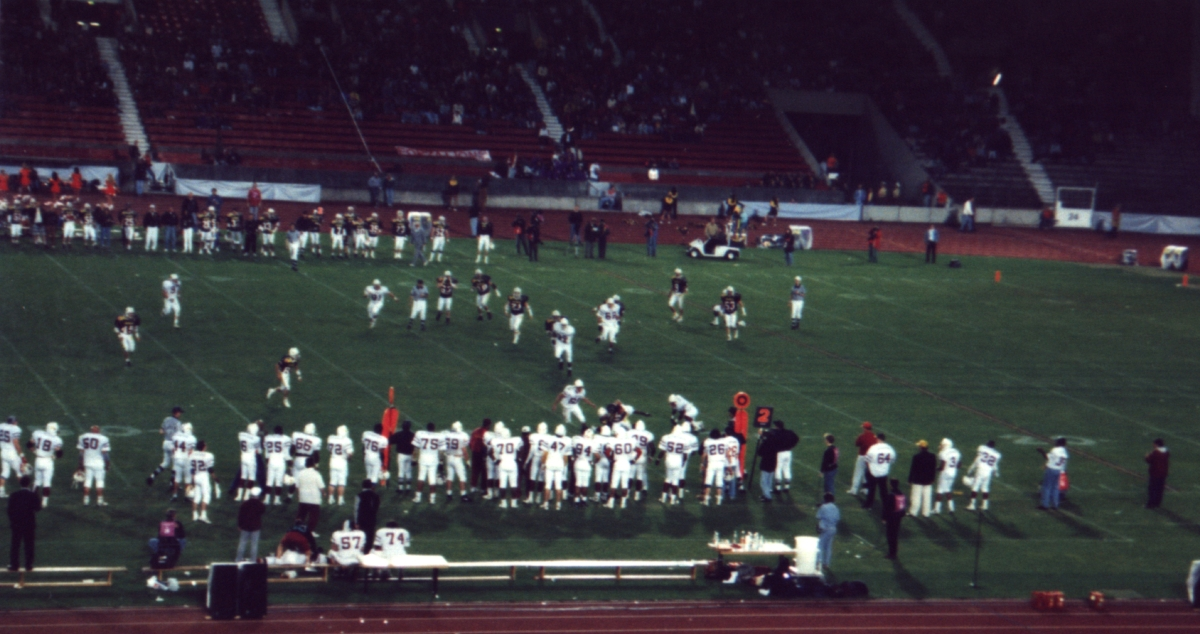
VIII Eurobowl in 1994, Lions Bergamo vs. London Olympians. Italian teams that have won the Eurobowl have been Frogs Legnano (1989) and Lions Bergamo (2000, 2001 and 2002)

Victories	Team	Seasons
12	Lions Bergamo	1993, 1998, 1999, 2000, 2001, 2002, 2003, 2004, 2005, 2006, 2007, 2008
7	Panthers Parma	2010, 2011, 2012, 2013, 2021, 2023, 2024
6	Frogs Legnano	1984, 1987, 1988, 1989, 1994, 1995
5	Milano Seamen	2014, 2015, 2017, 2018, 2019
5	Rhinos Milano	1981, 1982, 1983, 1990, 2016
3	Firenze Guelfi	2022, 2025, 2026
1	Giants Bolzano	2009
1	Pharaones Milano	1992
1	Giaguari Torino	1991
1	Warriors Bologna	1986
1	Doves Bologna	1985
1	Lupi Roma	1980

=== Geographical distribution of Italian Bowl winners ===
Geographical distribution of Italian Bowl winners

== See also ==
- Scudetto
- Spaghetti Bowl (American football)
- Sport in Italy
