= Great Falls High School =

Location
- 1900 2nd Avenue South; Great Falls, Montana 59405; United States; 47°30′07″N 111°16′26″W

Information
- Type: Public high school
- Established: 1890
- School district: Great Falls Public Schools
- Principal: Geoff Habel
- Teaching staff: 112.67 (full-time equivalent)
- Grades: 9 through 12
- Enrollment: 1,612 (2023–2024)
- Student to teacher ratio: 14.31
- Colors: White and blue
- Athletics: Baseball (boys); Basketball (boys and girls); Football (boys); Golf (boys and girls); Softball (girls); Soccer (boys and girls); Swimming(boys and girls); Tennis (boys and girls); Track and field (boys and girls); Volleyball (girls); Wrestling (boys and girls)
- Mascot: Bison
- Rival: Charles M. Russell High School
- Accreditation: Montana Office of Public Instruction; National Association of Schools and Colleges Regional Accreditation Association
- Yearbook: The Roundup
- Website: GFHS Web site

U.S. Historic district
- Designated: March 20, 2013
- Reference no.: 13000097

Great Falls High School (or GFHS) is a public high school for grades 9 through 12 located in Great Falls, Montana. Established in 1890, it was the city's first high school. The school's original building, constructed in 1896, is now on the National Register of Historic Places. GFHS began construction on its current building in 1929 and occupied it in the fall of 1930. The high school marked its 80th year in the structure during the 2010–2011 school year. The school's current building, constructed in 1930, was added to the National Register of Historic Places in March 2013.

== History ==
=== Founding and first high school building ===
Great Falls was founded in 1883. Businessman Paris Gibson surveyed the city in 1883 and platted a permanent settlement the south side of the river. It was incorporated on November 28, 1888. By 1890, Black Eagle Dam had been built within the city limits on the Great Falls of the Missouri River, a meat packing industry (the largest between St. Paul, Minnesota, and Spokane, Washington) had arisen, a railway had come to town, and a copper smelter had been built. The city's public school system was established in 1886. That year, the city opened the Whittier Building (later known as Whittier Elementary School) and began holding ungraded educational instruction for all students there.

Great Falls High School was founded in the fall of 1890 by the city of Great Falls after four teenage girls (newly arrived in the city) asked to receive a high school public education. The four young women constituted the first class, which met in a corner of a classroom in the Whittier Building (which, by that time, featured instruction in the sixth, seventh, and eighth grades). By September 1892, Great Falls High School was an independent school within the city public school system. Its 23 students also had a specified course of instruction (rather than general classes).

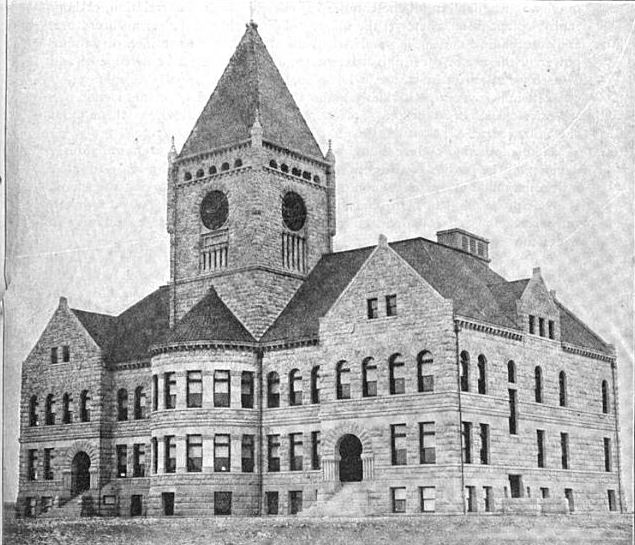
The original Great Falls High School Building, constructed in 1896.

In 1896, the Great Falls Public Schools built the first Great Falls High School building. City voters passed an initiative in 1893 to sell bonds to build a high school, but the Panic of 1893 delayed construction. A design by local architect William White was chosen over three other proposals. White's Romanesque Revival three-story structure featured a small central circular building, two rectangular wings, and an eight-story, four-faced clock tower. Construction on the building, located at 1400 First Avenue North, began in 1894. The high school was built of gray sandstone obtained from quarries near both Helena and Great Falls. The walls, which were 5 feet (1.5 m) thick at the bottom of the building but only 4 feet (1.2 m) thick at the roof, were sunk 16 feet (4.9 m) into the earth and stood on shale bedrock. To compact the foundation's backfill, a herd of sheep was driven around the structure 100 times. Wood for the interior supports, roof, and steps were cut from massive trees logged in the Rocky Mountains and floated down the Missouri River. The finished building featured a tin mansard roof (molded and painted to look like tile), gables, and an attic suspended from the roof joists. The interior woodwork was solid oak, all rooms had 3-foot (0.91 m) high wainscoting, the solid doors were 2.5-inch (6.4 cm) thick, and highly detailed molded pediments were emplaced over each door. Ornate brass doorknobs and hinges were used throughout the building, and heat was supplied by cast iron radiators with delicate, filigreed covers. The building (whose original cost was estimated at $59,940) was completed by McKay Brothers in 1896 at a total cost of $110,000. The structure, which was designed to educate 500 students, contained 14 classrooms, a physical laboratory, a chemical laboratory, an art studio, and an assembly hall that could seat 400. A boiler system was installed in the basement.

The first class of nine boys and 37 girls helped open the school on November 1, 1896. Helen Edgerton was the first principal. The graduating class of 1897 (the high school's first) contained five students, but commencement ceremonies were held in the Great Falls Opera House because the crowd attending graduation was so large.

A brick annex, designed by W.R. Lowery, was constructed against the high school's south side in 1913 at a cost of $200,000. At this time, the boiler system was moved from the basement of the high school to the area between the main building and the annex. An urban legend (which may have begun as early as the 1910s) began to circulate that the old boiler room was turned into a swimming pool, and that a student drowned in the pool—leaving the high school haunted. An investigation in the 1990s revealed that although student Grant Mill from Great Falls High School did drown in 1915, he did not drown in a fictitious pool in the basement but rather in the Missouri River. The clock tower was removed in 1916 after its massive weight began to compromise the building.

Great Falls High School moved into a new building in 1931. The old building was renamed Paris Gibson Junior High School, but the junior high school vacated the premises in 1975 for a new building at 2400 Central Avenue(The former Central Catholic High School ). In 1975, the building became the home of the Paris Gibson Square Museum of Art. It was listed on the National Register of Historic Places in September 1976.

=== Current building ===
In 1927, the Great Falls public school system sought voter approval to issue bonds to build a new high school, but this initiative was defeated. The bond issue was brought before voters again in 1928, and it passed. Construction on the $1 million building began in 1928 and continued through 1929.

The new building was designed by architects George W. Bird, Ernest B. Croft, and Johannes Van Teylingen. (Van Teylingen was one of the most prominent architects in Montana at the time. He also designed the Masonic Temple in Great Falls, the Great Falls Civic Center, and Turner Hall on the campus of the University of Montana.) The new high school was located at 1900 2nd Avenue South, and occupied four city blocks (between 2nd and 4th Avenues South, and 18th and 20th Streets South). The construction of the building generated strong debate over whether the high school's name should be changed. Former students asked that the school's name be changed to "Charles M. Russell High School" (after famed local artist Charles M. Russell), while businessmen in the city wanted the name to be "James J. Hill High School" (after James Jerome Hill, the chief executive officer of the Great Northern Railway, friend of Paris Gibson, and an initial investor in the town). But the name was not changed.

Another argument erupted over the type of brick to be used in the building. The architects specified that the exterior be built of dark brick. However, some school board trustees wanted local bricks to be used, but these were much lighter in color. As a compromise, dark imported bricks were used for the exterior and light, locally made bricks used for the interior—even though the locally made bricks cost more than twice as much.

While the high school was being built, workers discovered a huge cache of blasting powder in a manhole adjacent to the construction site. Since the manhole itself had been dug only two months earlier and no mining or construction company in the area reported any explosives missing, the discovery was even more mysterious.

The final cost of the building when it was finished on July 21, 1930, was $1.15 million. When the building opened in the fall of 1930, enrollment was 1,760 students—just shy of the 1,800 students the building was designed to accommodate. Great Falls High School included a gymnasium and a large football stadium west of the main entrance (which was on the west side of the long main north–south structure). The gym (known as Old Gym today) contained two underground lockerrooms and a hardwood basketball court surrounded by mezzanine seating that could accommodate 1,200 people. The stadium was named Memorial Stadium to honor those who fought and served in World War I. It featured concrete bleachers on the east side, clad in dark brick on their western face. A 256 square feet (23.8 m^{2}) two-story brick building (which contained a meeting room for the home team during pre-game and half-time on the ground floor, and concessions and public restrooms on the second) occupied the northeast corner of the field (connected to the Old Gym by a tunnel), while an identical brick building (with no tunnel) occupied the southeast corner. Other tunnels ran beneath the building and then 1963 T-wing, providing maintenance staff with access to the electrical and steam heating system and capable of acting as nuclear fallout shelters. Four coal-fired boilers were installed in the basement. Although the school only needed two, the idea was that two would be used one year, and two the next—extending the life of the boilers much longer.

The construction of the new Great Falls High School building proved fortuitous. The lack of a gymnasium and athletic facilities at the old Great Falls High School led to a student lawsuit against the school district. In McNair v. School District No. 1 of Cascade County (Mont.), the Montana Supreme Court held in 1930 that a gymnasium was a "necessary and essential part of a school plant". Had the new high school with its gymnasium and stadium not been built, the school district would have been forced to construct them.

There have been a number of changes and additions to Great Falls High School since its initial construction. In 1954, the school district built an addition to the southern end of the high school, expanding facilities for choir, orchestra, and band. The western grandstand (with its press box and concessions area) was also built in 1957. The "T-wing" on the building's east side opened in 1963. This three-story addition housed the business and home economics departments on the first floor, a new library and the history departments on the second floor, and the biology, chemistry, and physics department on the third floor. The east facade of the T-wing now formed a new main entrance to the high school. A two-story industrial arts annex (connected to the main building via a skywalk) was opened in 1975, significantly expanding the school's ability to offer vocational-technical education. In 1979, after GFHS was warned it could lose its accreditation due to the cramped conditions of its 50-year-old gymnasium, the school district built Bison Fieldhouse—a modern sports facility with 3,600-seat basketball arena, A 25 yard swimming pool, complete with warmup pool, classrooms, weight-training room, boys and girls lockerrooms, offices, sports training and conditioning rooms, and parking lot. In 1980, an all-weather, latex, six-lane running track was built around the football field inside Memorial Stadium. All but the lowest panel of each of the school's 15-foot (4.6 m) high 12/12 and 9/9 double-hung windows were blocked off in 1982 and 1983 with insulated foam panels as an energy-saving measure. The track surface was replaced in 1990.

In 1995, the Great Falls Public Schools commissioned a study which looked at ways to alleviate overcrowding at GFHS as well as make the school IDEA-compliant. The study recommended building an addition to house classrooms and the construction of an elevator in the main building to give students access to science laboratory space on the structure's second and third floors. Too few voters turned out in balloting on April 2 and June 4, 1996, for a valid election to occur. A third election was successful, however. The bond issue funded construction of 13 new classrooms and the elevator. The classroom addition to Bison Fieldhouse (known as "South Campus") opened in the summer of 1998. The elevator began operation the same year. In 1999, a local attorney and his family donated $300,000 to GFHS to build a one-story addition to the northern end of the school to accommodate wrestling training and weight-lifting facilities.

With the construction of Charles M. Russell High School in 1963, Memorial Stadium began to be shared by the two high schools. The stadium underwent significant renovations from 1999 to 2002. The fieldhouse pool underwent reconstruction in 1994 to replace its fiberglass lining. Cracks in the lining were discovered in February 1999 and patched. Larger cracks appeared in March 1999, so the entire lining was replaced (under no cost to the school, as it was under a 25-year warranty) and the pool reopened in November 1999.

The 1998 and early 2000s improvements to the school did not come soon enough, however. The family of a handicapped student at Great Falls High School sued the school, arguing that the quality of their child's education had been impaired due to a lack of IDEA-compliant facilities. In September 1998, the Montana Human Rights Commission agreed, and ordered the school district to make improvements and pay the family a monetary settlement. The school district appealed the decision on technical grounds, arguing that not all administrative remedies had been pursued. On June 7, 2001, the Montana State Supreme Court held against the school district and upheld the Human Rights Commission's decision.

In 2003, Bison Fieldhouse was renamed R.W. "Bill" Swarthout Fieldhouse. Swarthout was a successful football coach at GFHS from 1948 to 1956, winning four state championships. He caught polio, recovered, and returned to GFHS as men's basketball coach (again winning several state titles). He was appointed principal at GFHS in 1957, and held that position until his retirement in 1983. During his tenure at the school, he introduced girls' sports for the first time, installed the first computers for student use, and led the fight to win funding to construct the fieldhouse. He died on December 16, 1997. The school board unanimously voted to rename the fieldhouse after him on February 24, 2003.

The basketball court at Swarthout Fieldhouse underwent its first major renovation in 2011. The original wooden bleachers had become damaged after years of use (and fans jumping up and down on them), and new blue-and-white colored fiberglass bleachers ordered to replace them. Removable bleachers were also added to the east and west ends of the fieldhouse, expanding the capacity of the court. All the bleachers featured wider walkways and new handrails for enhanced safety. The cost of the replacement, planned for August 2011, was $370,000 (paid for out of the school district's maintenance fund).

=== 2000s administrative turnover ===
R.W. "Bill" Swarthout was principal at Great Falls High from 1957 to 1983, providing a remarkable 26 years of stability at the school. In 2004, the Great Falls Tribune called him "one of the most influential coaches and educators in the city's history." His successor was assistant principal William Salonen, who led the school from 1983 to 1988. Karol K. Johnson, former dean of students at C.M. Russell High, held the principal position from 1988 to 1990. Johnson's successor was former boys' basketball coach and assistant principal Gary Davis, who held the top job from 1990 to 1999.

Davis' successor was assistant principal Tracy Clark. But Clark retired after just a year as principal, citing health reasons and the retirement of his wife (also a city public school teacher). C.M. Russell High School assistant principal Steve Henneberg was chosen to replace Clark in 2000. But Henneberg resigned in July 2001 after he and another man (who had accused Henneberg of having an affair with his wife) engaged in a public fistfight in a local bank parking lot. With just a month to go before the opening of school, the Great Falls Public Schools asked retired principal Gary Davis to take over as "interim principal" for a year while a national search for a new principal was made. Davis agreed. The rapid succession of principals was "destabilizing" the high school, the local press said.

In 2002, Dr. Fred Anderson was appointed principal at Great Falls High School. Anderson, who has PhD in education administration, was principal for Custer County District High School in Miles City for 20 years. He remained principal as of the 2010–2011 school year. However, in May 2012, Great Falls Public Schools Superintendent Dr. Cheryl Crawley announced that Dr. Anderson would be transferred to take over as principal of North Middle School. North Middle School principal Jane Gregoire took over at GFHS. Also assigned to GFHS was associate principal Julie Tramelli.

Gregoire retired at the end of the 2014–2015 school year, and assistant principal Heather Hoyer was named as her successor.

== Campus ==
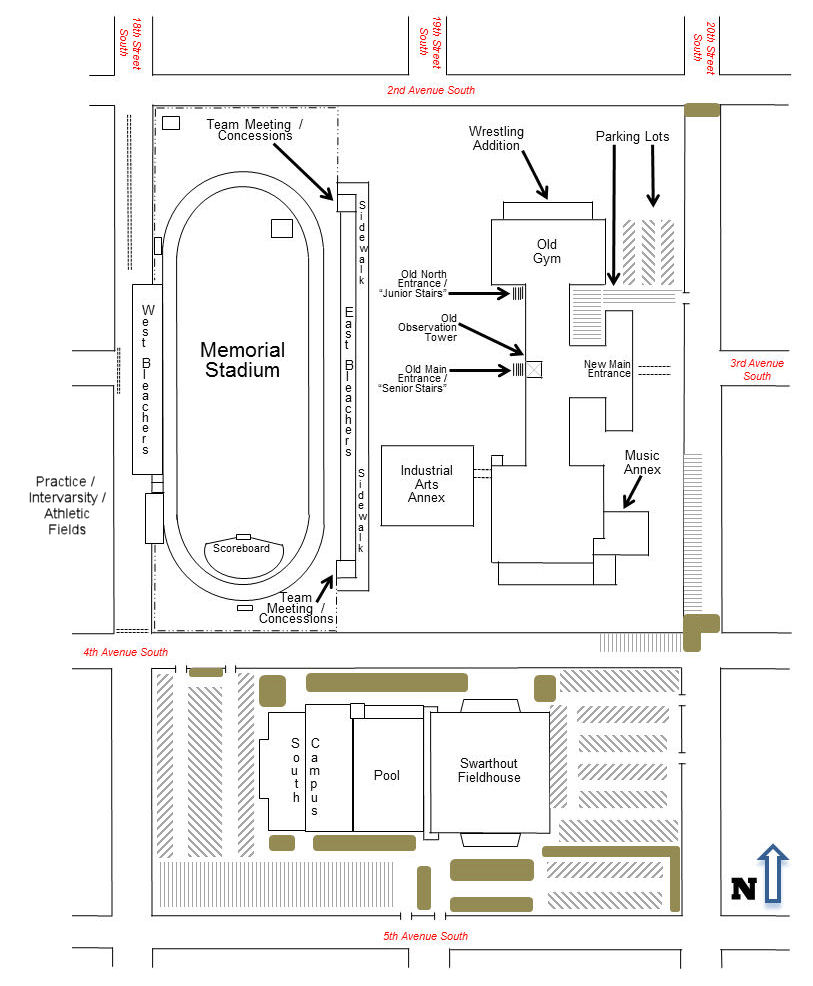
Campus map of Great Falls High School, as of 2011.

=== Campus description ===
Great Falls High School is a modified Renaissance Revival structure, and the building and its campus were designed to imitate an Ivy League college. The main building faces west and is built along a north–south line. It is about 75 feet (23 m) wide and 300 feet (91 m) long. A square classroom wing about 75 feet (23 m) on each side connects the main building to another north–south classroom wing (about 40 feet (12 m) wide and 175 feet (53 m) long) to the east. On the north end of the main building is the east–west-oriented, rectangular "Old Gym" wing, which is about 175 feet (53 m) wide and 100 feet (30 m) long. Against the "Old Gym", on the northern extreme of the high school, is the wrestling addition. This single-story, east-west running rectangular addition is about 150 feet (46 m) wide and 50 feet (15 m) long. On the south end of the main building is a classroom wing about 175 feet (53 m) on each side. An L-shaped addition housing music classrooms hugs half the eastern side of this wing, as well as the entire south side of the wing. To the west of the square south classroom wing is the industrial arts annex, an east–west-running building about 115 feet (35 m) long and 135 feet (41 m) wide.

The main campus is bounded by 2nd Avenue South on the north, 20th Street South on the east, 4th Avenue South on the south, and 18th Street South on the west. Memorial Stadium backs directly against 18th Street, which has been blocked off to vehicular traffic since at least the mid-1970s. 20th Street South was blocked off between 4th and 2nd Streets South in 1978, and now is used as a maintenance vehicle access road for the high school. 4th Avenue South between 18th and 20th Streets South was blocked off at the same time, although the eastern and western portions of the street provide non-through traffic access to the parking lots on the east and west sides of the fieldhouse.

R.W. "Bill" Swarthout Fieldhouse is south of the main school building across 4th Avenue South. The building was constructed in the Modernist architectural style, with the unfinished concrete exterior reflecting the Brutalist genre of Modern architecture. The east-west running rectangular building is about 200 feet (61 m) long and 435 feet (133 m) wide, with the western one-fifth of the structure consisting of the South Campus classroom addition. Swarthout Fieldhouse is bounded by 4th Avenue South on the north, 20th Street South on the east, 5th Avenue South on the south, and 18th Street South on the west. Except for 4th Avenue South (as noted above), all streets are open to vehicular traffic.

The original main entrance to Great Falls High School was in the center of the original building on the west side. However, construction of the industrial arts annex, closure of 4th Street South, and other alterations to the campus plan led the school to treat its unadorned, plain east entrance as its main access portal. By tradition, only seniors may now exit in and out of the old west-side main entrance and sit on or use the old west main exterior staircase (the "Senior Stairs"). This tradition was started in 1931. The west-side exit and staircase to the north of the main exit (adjacent to the Old Gym) is traditionally used only by juniors (the "Junior Stairs").

=== Bison logo, "GF" logo and "Rolling Thunder" ===
Beginning in 1968, Great Falls High School began using a logo with the word "Bison" in the form of a bison. The logo was designed by then-student Daniel Clasby. In the fall of 1968, Clasby was lying in bed when the idea for a logo came to him. He spent several hours that night working on it, and then showed it to art teacher Don Walters. Walters heartily approved of it, and so did many of the school's athletes. A silk screen was made, and Clasby and his friends began making posters and T-shirts with the logo on it. The Bison Logo (seen in the infobox) was an immediate hit. In time, the logo was added to the front of the press box in Memorial Stadium, where it still existed as of 2015.

Students from GFHS maintain a giant "GF" logo on the side of Hill 57 (near the intersection of Valley View Drive and 11th Street NW), which overlooks the city of Great Falls. The logo is composed of whitewashed stones, which GFHS students regularly repaint and keep in place. (The hill is named for city backer James J. Hill, and in the first three decades of the 20th century had the numbers "57" on it—an advertising gimmick for Heinz 57 food products.)

In December 2009, First Interstate Bancorp donated a life-size, iron buffalo sculpture (titled "Rolling Thunder") to Great Falls High School. The sculpture had previously been on display at the bank's downtown Great Falls branch, but the bank donated the sculpture when the old branch closed and a new one (which could not accommodate the artwork) opened. The sculpture was installed in the main classroom building in the center of the hallway near the old main west entrance.

=== Renovations ===
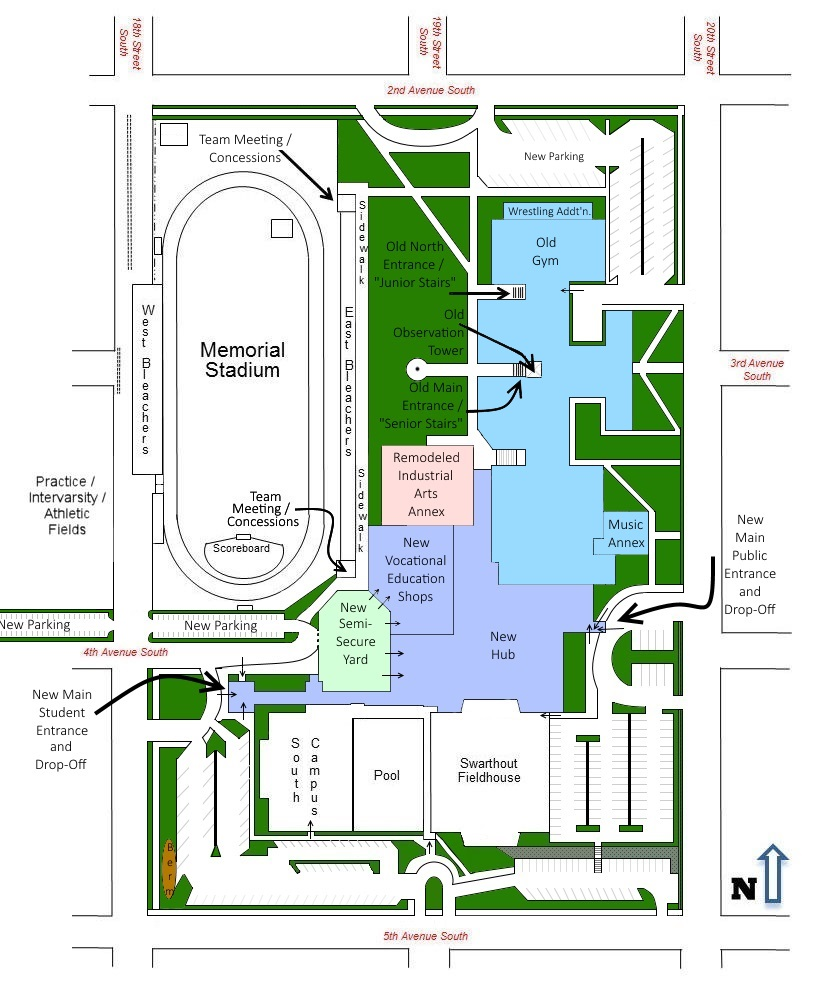
Forthcoming changes to GFHS. New indoor construction is in light purple; remodeling is shown in light red; new outdoor construction is in light green.

In February 2010, Dr. Cheryl K. Crawley, Great Falls Public Schools Superintendent, established a task force to study the physical plant at GFHS. The task force's charge is to recommend improvements and changes to the buildings, grounds, and physical plant of the high school so that the school can continue to provide a high-quality education while remaining at near-capacity in terms of enrollment. Dr. Crawley's report noted that GFHS currently has dining facilities too small for the size of the student body; requires students, faculty, staff, and the public to walk outdoors during winter weather to move between buildings (a safety hazard); does not integrate the South Campus with the Upper Campus; lacks an adequate HVAC system (particularly in moving fresh air into the interior, as well as moving air around inside the building); cannot accommodate high-bandwidth computer or phone lines; and has poor cell phone, television, and radio reception. The building also lacks zoned heat regulation, which makes some areas of the building too hot and others too cold and reduces energy efficiency. School officials also say the Old Gym HVAC system is not functioning well, there are aging light fixtures throughout the building, and the hallways on the second and third floors are dark. Additionally, student traffic flows throughout the building are poor (especially in the skywalk leading to the industrial arts annex), and the industrial arts annex suffers from safety problems.

School district trustees approved $150,000 in 2010 to conduct an architectural study of the building. Representatives from seven architectural and engineering firms toured the facility on June 30, 2011. In 2015, GFPS officials proposed a $98 million bond levy to improve GFHS, C.M. Russell High School, and 20 of the city's elementary and middle schools. The proposal included $20.76 million in infrastructure improvements at GFHS, to include a new heating and ventilation system; replacement of all electrical outlets and circuit-breaker panels; replacement of all fresh water pipes, sinks, toilets, and water fountains; replacement of insulation-covered 1960s windows with new energy-efficient windows; remodeling of all main building classrooms (including installation of audio-visual and other flexible modern teaching technology); creation of new parking areas; installation of a main fiber optic line in the main building, with a peripheral line to each classroom; and construction of a reliable and high-speed wireless system throughout the campus. The proposal also included $16.57 million in new construction at Great Falls High, including construction of a "Hub" building containing career and technical education (CTE) classrooms; (Note: Total CTE space would expand to 37,000 square feet (3,400 m^{2}) from 14,000 square feet (1,300 m^{2}).) eight science, technology, engineering, and math (STEM) classrooms; a modern and expanded cafeteria and dining space; an informal social and gathering space for students; two new main entrances to the school (replacing the existing main building and fieldhouse entrances). (Note: GFPS officials noted that visitors and emergency responders are often confused about where the school's entrances are. Creation of new main entrances resolves this issue. Placement of school administration offices in the Hub near the entrances also enhances security, as the current offices are not located near an entrance and do not permit them to be monitored.) The 68,000 square feet (6,300 m^{2}) Hub would also act as a bridging structure, connecting the main building, existing industrial arts annex, fieldhouse, and South Campus so that students would no longer need to go outdoors to move from one facility to another. It would also make access to all four building much easier for students with physical disabilities. Another $705,000 would be spent replacing sod at Memorial Stadium with artificial turf, to allow more use and generate more revenue as well as to cut down substantially on maintenance costs. The running track would also be resurfaced. (Note: In addition to being safer, artificial turf would substantially decrease maintenance and water costs and eliminate the need to replace the aged irrigation system. The city proposed spending $800,000 to install artificial turf and $225,000 to resurface the running track. Existing athletic reserve funds in the amount of $320,000 lowered the cost needed to be generated by the bond levy to just $705,000.) Another $250,000 would be spent upgrading the school's antiquated telephone system. About $975,000 would be used to transform grassy areas into student parking. Voters approved the high school levy on October 4, 2016, by 60.9 percent (11,341 to 7,187).

The bond levy required GFPS to seek matching funds to replace 16 of the school's windows. In order to preserve the school's NRHP-protected status, architects had to design special window frames, making the cost of each window $5,000. On December 20, 2016, the GFHS Class of 1965 donated one window and the Student Council of 2015 and 2016 donated two windows. Additional funds were raised by the GFHS Class of 1995 and GFHS Class of 2015. Individual alumni paid for four more windows. The first three windows were installed in the library, with the remainder in the bell tower.

=== Memorial Stadium ===
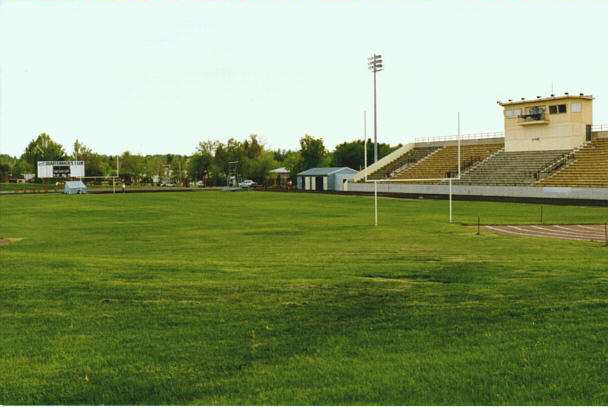
Looking southeast across the field at Memorial Stadium in 1988.

By the late 1990s, Memorial Stadium was in serious disrepair. The stadium's seating and restroom facilities were not ADA-compliant, the sidewalk on the eastern side of the stadium and the concrete steps in the east side bleachers were crumbling from over-use, poor drainage had damaged the foundation of the east side bleachers so much that their structural integrity was at risk, concession areas were too small, and the meeting rooms for home and visitor football teams were plagued by small size as well as humidity, mold, and general disrepair from overuse. The cost of creating ADA-compliant facilities, fixing the drainage problem, and rebuilding the steps was estimated at $500,000. Complete reconstruction of the eastern bleachers, along with improvements to concessions and team meeting spaces, was set at $2 million. Despite the expense, the rebuild option had the advantage of widening the running track around the field. This would permit the track to expand from its current six lanes to 10 lanes (allowing the stadium to host the state track meet), and would also permit widening of the grass field to permit soccer games. A committee of school board members and public citizens studied the issue, and recommended in November 1999 that $475,000 be spent to improve the drainage, fix the east sidewalk, make ADA-required improvements, and upgrade the team meeting room buildings. But the committee reported some bad news as well. It discovered that the running track also needed to be replaced (at a cost of $400,000) because drainage problems and substrata settling had caused portions of the track to buckle and the latex surface to separate from its asphalt base. The committee suggested spending up to $250,000 for a new high-tech surface (rather than replace the existing latex one). Finally, the committee suggested spending $235,000 to improve exit stairs, upgrade and expand bathrooms in the west grandstand, widen aisles in the west grandstand, replace railings in the west grandstand, and replace benches and chairs throughout the stadium with aluminum seating. Some committee members suggested replacing the east bleachers entirely at a cost of $1.8 million to allow for track expansion, and argued the city should seek a private donor or corporate sponsorship of the stadium to pay for the cost. The school board was not receptive to this latter idea, but agreed to endorse an effort by a group of private citizens to try to raise the required $2.2 million total.

Following the study committee's report, the school board agreed to use a one-time refund on insurance premiums to pay for $575,000 in repairs at Memorial Stadium. These included east bleacher drainage improvements, east bleacher foundation and stairway improvements, and adding handicapped-accessible areas to both the east and west grandstands. The cost of these upgrades increased to $600,000 in May 2000. Costs had actually decreased because an engineer's assessment came in lower than expected and an accounting error was discovered that removed double-counting of expenses. With the additional expenditure of just $25,000, however, the work could now be expanded to include entirely replacing the east bleachers, replacing the running track, and doubling the size of the team meeting/concessions buildings. In May 2000, the work was expected to be complete by the fall. The school board had yet to decide whether the track should be expanded to 10 lanes, but did agree to solicit bids to determine the cost of improving the west grandstand. The track was expanded to eight lanes two weeks later. The track work contract came in 16 percent low, which enabled the school district to add improvements to the long-jump paths and pits as well. The contract for replacing the east bleachers, however, came in $95,000 high after contractors discovered that the existing drainage system was far more damaged than previously suspected. In June 2000, the school board agreed to tap its general maintenance fund to pay for the work on the west bleachers after these cost estimates came in much lower than expected.

Not all the money for these improvements was going to come from current funds, however. The school board hoped to sign a contract with local bottling companies to provide semi-exclusive access for their products in city schools, and anticipated using most or all of that money to help pay for the west grandstand improvements. By now, work on the east bleacher seating was due to be complete in time for the start of the football season in September 2000, although renovations to the concessions areas and the restrooms on the east end would take longer. The board authorized contract talks with local Coca-Cola and Pepsi bottlers in August 2000 to secure a $250,000 payment in exchange for giving the two companies exclusive distribution rights in city schools.

Work on the east bleachers was completed around November 2000, slightly behind schedule. The brick team meeting buildings had been doubled in size and heating added to them, restrooms on the upper floors expanded, handicapped-accessible restrooms added, and the concessions areas enlarged. Eight wheelchair-accessible seating spaces for handicapped spectators were added in the middle and at both ends of the east grandstand, drainage improved, the sidewalk widened to 12 feet (3.7 m) and replaced, and better signage and improved lighting installed. The running track, too, had been replaced.

The improvements to Memorial Stadium's west grandstand were made in 2001. About $362,774 was spent to add wheelchair lifts and wheelchair-accessible seating in the west bleachers. These costs included replacement of the wood and fiberglass seating with aluminum chairs, and the addition of an aisle to the front of the lower bleachers. Although the contractor saved money because work proceeded ahead of schedule (due to mild weather), an additional $13,558 was appropriated for the improvements after workers discovered that the west concourse beneath the stands had been built directly on clay rather than on a foundation. This area was slightly excavated, gravel was used to fill in the space, and a firmer foundation created for the concourse. Workers also discovered that instead of a concrete foundation, the north and south walls of the west grandstand were built on a wood foundation—which had rotted away. The rotten wood was removed, concrete footings were poured, and a new rot-resistant wood foundation for the walls set in place. Contractors also installed new grandstand gates (to control access to the track from the bleachers), and said the entire project would be completed after the end of the track and field season in May 2001. A few weeks later, the school board approved the semi-exclusive soda and juice distribution contracts with Coke and Pepsi. Each contract gave the school district $50,000 a year for five years (for a total of $500,000). District officials approved the expenditure of $360,000 from the contract revenues to pay for west bleacher improvements. Most recently, the school completed a reennovation of the scoreboard, implementing a new $220,000 Daktronics scoreboard in which can display visuals.

=== National Register of Historic Places ===
In mid 2012, a group of Great Falls High School graduates formed the Great Falls High School Heritage Foundation, with the goal of having the current high school's building placed on the National Register of Historic Places (NRHP). The building was officially listed as a national historic place on March 20, 2013.

Architectural Digest magazine called Great Falls High School the most beautiful public school in Montana in 2017.

=== Notable events at GFHS ===
Several notable events have occurred at Great Falls High School. In 1943, famed jazz trumpet player Louis Armstrong and his band performed for the GFHS Senior Prom (held at the Great Falls Civic Center). On September 26, 1963, more than 20,000 people crowded into Memorial Stadium to listen to a speech about conservation by President John F. Kennedy.

== Curriculum ==
School district policy and Great Falls High School require that students complete 23 credits for coursework to graduate. This includes four credits of English, three credits of social studies, three credits of mathematics, three credits of science, two credits of "health enhancement" (physical education and general health education), one credit of career or technical education, one credit of fine arts, a half-credit of computer literacy, and one credit of "sequential concentration" (e.g., an additional credit of either career/technical studies or fine arts, or two years of the same foreign language). Only 1.5 credits are left as electives for the student to choose on their own. Credits are offered by 12 departments, which include art, business, drama, English, family and consumer services, foreign (world) language, health enhancement and physical education, industrial technology, mathematics, music, science, and social studies.

GFHS also offers Advanced Placement courses, special college-level courses approved by the College Board which take a full year to complete but which supply the advanced student with a more challenging and high-quality education. The courses offered include Advanced Placement Biology, Advanced Placement Calculus, Advanced Placement English Literature and Composition, Advanced Placement Studio Art Drawing, Advanced Placement United States Government and Politics, and Advanced Placement United States History.

Great Falls High also offers 12 "dual credit" courses, in which a student is granted college credit for courses taken at the high school. There is a cost (borne by the student) for taking a course and having the credit apply as "dual credit," although this cost is less than if the student were enrolled solely at the college. Universities offering "dual credit" courses include Montana State University College of Technology – Great Falls, Montana Tech of the University of Montana, Montana State University – Northern, and the University of Great Falls.

Additionally, certain career/technical courses (CTEs) may also earn the student college credit. These "CTE College Credit" courses are honored by all community colleges in Montana as well as all tribal colleges in Montana. The three "CTE College Credit" courses require that the student take an assessment at the end of the course to earn the college credit.

The graduation and completion rate at Great Falls High School is slightly lower than the county average but above the state average. In 2005, GFHS's graduation and completion rate was 87.2 percent, while the same rate for all high schools in Cascade County (public and private) was 88.9 percent that year. For all high schools statewide in Montana in the same year, the graduation and completion rate was 84.8 percent. In 2010, GFHS had a dropout rate of 9.5 percent. But stronger efforts to keep students in school led to a significant improvement in 2011, when the dropout rate was just 5.2 percent (no longer the highest in the state).

For most of its early decades, GFHS taught courses to students in grades 9 through 12. However, with the adoption of the junior high school in Great Falls in the 1920s, the high school taught only grades 10 through 12. In the mid-1980s, the school district adopted the middle school model, and 9th grade was taught once more at GFHS.

=== Curriculum awards and academic challenges ===
In the late 1930s, Great Falls High School won national notice for its efforts to integrate teaching of the social sciences and physical sciences, and for its attempt to engage students in critical thinking about future societal needs.

More recently, GFHS has had trouble meeting the "adequate yearly progress" (AYP) standards established by the No Child Left Behind Act of 2001 (NCLB).

Year	AYP Status	Action to be taken
2003	Did not make AYP	None
2004	Made AYP	None
2005	Made AYP	None
2006	Did not make AYP	Put on Watch List
2007	Did not make AYP	1st Year Identified for Improvement
2008	Did not make AYP	2nd Year Identified for Improvement
2009	Did not make AYP	1st Year Identified for Corrective Action
2010	Did not make AYP	1st Year Identified for Restructuring
2011	Did not make AYP	2nd Year Identified for Restructuring

Schools that miss AYP are put on a watch list. If a school misses AYP for a second consecutive year, the school is publicly labeled as being "in need of improvement." The school is then required to develop a two-year improvement plan for the subject(s) that the school is not teaching well. GFHS was forced to develop this plan for implementation in the 2007–2008 school year. Missing AYP in the third year forces the school to offer free tutoring and other supplemental education services to struggling students. GFHS was forced to offer these services in the 2009–2010 school year. If a school misses AYP for a fourth consecutive year, the school is publicly labeled as requiring "corrective action." Corrective actions could include wholesale replacement of staff, introduction of a new curriculum, or extending the amount of time students spend in class. GFHS was forced to implement corrective action in the 2010–2011 school year.

If a school misses AYP for a fifth year, planning for restructuring is required. Common restructuring options include closing the school, turning the school into a charter school, hiring a private company to run the school, or asking the state office of education to directly run the school.

If GFHS missed AYP in the 2011–2012 school year, the restructuring plan was supposed to be implemented in the 2012–2013 school year. The Montana Office of Public Instruction said on August 4 that the school missed AYP for the 2010–2011 school year. However, in August 2011 the state sought and received a waiver from the U.S. Department of Education which kept testing standards static for the 2010–2011 school year rather than raising them, which allowed hundreds of schools across the state to meet AYP. This did not affect Great Falls High school, however. The school had until September 13, 2011, to appeal its AYP test scores and meet AYP.

== Extracurricular activities ==
Great Falls High School offers a wide variety of extracurricular opportunities for students.

The Iniwa (a Piegan Blackfeet word meaning "bison") was the Great Falls High School student newspaper. It was founded in 1921, and originally named Hi-Life (because of Great Falls' proximity to the "Hi-Line" region across northern Montana). The Hi-life won a fourth-place prize in the Class A division of the prestigious Columbia Scholastic Press Association (CSPA) student news awards in 1931. Over the years, the Hi-Life and Iniwa have won numerous journalism awards. In 2006 Iniwa editor Roman Stubbs was named Montana High School Journalist of the Year by the Montana Journalism Education Association. In 2009, the CSPA awarded the Iniwa second-place honors in the "general or humor commentary" category, third-place honors in the "entertainment reviews" category, and certificates of merit in the "single sports photograph color" and "sports page design: tabloid format color" categories. Also in 2009, Iniwa editor-in-chief Megan Gretch was named Montana High School Journalist of the year by the Montana Journalism Education Association. Additionally, Gretch was selected to represent the state of Montana at the 2009 Free Spirit Conference. This annual event started in 1999 and is funded by the Newseum Institute to honor Al Neuharth, the founder of USA Today, the Newseum, and the Freedom Forum. In 2010, Iniwa reporter Mary Koppy was named Montana High School Journalist of the Year, the newspaper given first place in the "Pacesetter" (given for all-around excellence) and "Newspaper Design" categories, and Iniwa staff honored in the categories of news writing and editorial cartooning.

Group activities are common at GFHS. The Roundup, the annual yearbook jointly edited by students at GFHS, has been published since 1907. In 2001, it won a National Pacemaker Award (the "Pulitzer Prize of student journalism") from the National Scholastic Press Association. In addition to for-credit choirs, orchestra, symphonic band, concert band, and the Blue Notes jazz band, the high school offers students the opportunity to play in the Pep Band and the Bison Marching Band; play in the Chamber Orchestra; or sing in one of several choirs, including the Delphian Choir, Rhapsody Choir, Aeolian Choir, or Lyric Choir. In 2014, the Delphian Choir received second place in the prestigious American Prize in Choral Performance (high school/youth choir division). The school's theme song is Anchors Aweigh. It is not clear why this theme song was chosen by the school, but it was in use as early as 1924. Some speculate that the theme might have been chosen to honor a graduate who served in the United States Navy during World War I, or because the school colors are Navy blue and white. (The school's lyrics to the piece closely mimic the first stanza of the original lyrics to the Navy song.)

There is also a speech and debate team that has been in existence since the early 1960s. The team itself is competing in the AA circuit and has hosted numerous tournaments. Both Great Falls High and CMR have long-standing programs for the activity.

=== Athletics ===
GFHS competes in Class AA athletics against other high schools with a two-year average enrollment of at least 826 students. This class encompasses only the largest high schools in the state. The school is a member of the Montana High School Association (MHSA), whose rules and guidelines cover not only competitive athletics but also non-competitive cheerleading and spirit activities. The school's spirit squad are known as the Bisonettes.

==== Sports ====
- Basketball (boys and girls)
- Football (boys)
- Cross country running (boys and girls)
- Golf (boys and girls)
- Softball (girls)
- Soccer (boys and girls)
- Swimming and diving (boys and girls)
- Tennis (boys and girls)
- Track and field (boys and girls)
- Volleyball (girls)
- Wrestling (boys)

==== State level competition ====
Boys’ Basketball

- State Champions: Class A - 1938, 1944, 1965; Class AA - 1956, 1962, 1976,1994, 1995, 2006
- State Runners-Up: Class A - 1935, 1939, 1947, 1951; Class AA - 1957, 1963, 1975,1977, 1984, 1998, 2021

Girls’ Basketball

- State Champions: Class A - 1974; Class AA - 1980, 1981, 1982
- State Runners-Up: Class AA - 1979, 1984, 2016

Boys’ Cross Country

- State Champions: Class AA - 1975, 1979, 2023

Girls’ Cross Country

- State Champions: Class AA - 1975, 1977, 1985, 2000

Football

- State Champions: No Classes - 1905, 1906*, 1925*; Class A - 1936; Class AA - 1948, 1949, 1954, 1965, 1966*, 1969, 1971, 1973, 1974, 1983, 1988 (* co-champion)
- State Runners Up: No Classes - 1904, 1910, 1915, 1916, 1921, 1922; Class A - 1935, 1938; Class AA - 1939, 1946, 1967, 1968, 1972, 1985, 1989, 1990

Girls’ Tennis

- Team Champions: 2009 (AA)
- Individual Champions: 2009 (AA), 2010 (AA), 2013 (AA)

Boys' Track and Field

- Team Champions: No Classes - 1922, 1923, 1929; Class AA - 1962, 1965, 1967, 1968, 1970, 1976, 1977, 1978, 1989, 1990

Girls' Track and Field

- Team Champions: Class AA - 1983, 1985

Boys' Wrestling

- Team State Champions: Class AA - 1959, 1970, 1972, 1999, 2013, 2014, 2015, 2020* (* co-champion)
- Individual State Champions: 46

== Notable faculty and administrators ==
Among the notable administrators, teachers, and staff who have worked at Great Falls High School are:

- Fred Anderson, Principal, 2006 Journalism Education Association Administrator of the Year; AA 2012 Principal of the Year, member of the Montana House of Representatives

== Notable alumni ==
- Dorothy Josephine Baker, also known as Big Dorothy, was an American madam in Helena, Montana, in the mid-20th century
- Walt Coburn, Western author and "King of the Western Pulps" in the 1930s
- Lin Sue Cooney, former reporter at KPNX-TV in Phoenix, Arizona
- Garrison Courtney, former Chief of Public Affairs for the Drug Enforcement Administration
- Monte Dolack, noted Montana artist
- Ken Dow, fullback for the Washington Redskins
- Richard Ford, Pulitzer Prize-winning author of Independence Day
- Jack Gillespie, professional basketball forward who led GFHS to a Montana high school basketball championship in 1964
- Reed Harris, college football wide receiver for the Arizona State Sun Devils.
- Paul Hatfield, former United States Senator and U.S. District Court Judge
- Kris Heppner, football placekicker for the Seattle Seahawks and Washington Redskins.
- Joseph Kinsey Howard, author of the landmark study Montana: High, Wide, and Handsome
- Ryan Lance, CEO of ConocoPhillips
- Robert Raymond Makela, paleontologist, co-discovered Maiasaura, the first dinosaur eggs ever found in North America, and the first evidence of dinosaur parental care.
- Stump Mitchell, running back for the Phoenix Cardinals
- Hal Moe, running back for the Chicago Cardinals
- George Montgomery, actor
- Dallas Neil, former punter and tight end for the Atlanta Falcons and the New York Jets
- Kerry Porter, former running back for the Buffalo Bills, the Oakland Raiders and the Denver Broncos
- Brian Salonen, tight end for the Dallas Cowboys
- Dirk Sandefur, Associate Justice, Montana Supreme Court
- Casey Schreiner, former State Representative, House Minority Leader 66th Montana Legislature, youngest House Democratic Leader in MT History.
- Jaymee Sire, former ESPN sportscaster and current Food Network host
- Corey Stapleton, Secretary of State of Montana
- Ron Warzeka, defensive tackle for the Oakland Raiders.
- Reggie Watts, comedian and musician.
- Bruce Williamson, former President and chief executive officer, Dynegy energy company.
- Bill Zadick, four-time state wrestling champion and NCAA national wrestling champion.
- Mike Zadick, four-time state wrestling champion and Olympic wrestler.

== Educational foundation ==
Great Falls High School is supported in part by the Bison Alumni Academic Foundation. The private foundation, which is not formally associated with the school, was founded in 2007 by GFHS alumni. Its mission is to raise funds for the school to enhance its academic excellence.

== Footnotes ==
Notes

Citations

== Bibliography ==
- Andrews, Hans A. Awards and Recognition for Exceptional Teachers: K-12 and Community College: Programs in the U.S.A., Canada, and Other Countries. Ottawa, Ill.: Matilda Press, 2006.
- Ashby, Norma B. Movie Stars and Rattlesnakes: The Heyday of Montana Live Television. Helena, Mont.: Farcountry Press, 2004.
- Baumler, Ellen. Montana Chillers: 13 True Tales of Ghosts and Hauntings. Helena, Mont.: Farcountry Press, 2009.
- Bureau of Agriculture, Labor and Industry. Seventh Report of the Bureau of Agriculture, Labor and Industry for the year ended November 30, 1900. Helena, Mont.: Independent Publishing Co., 1900.
- Cristy, Raphael James. Charles M. Russell: The Storyteller's Art. Albuquerque, N.M.: University of New Mexico Press, 2004.
- Federal Writers' Project. Montana: A State Guide Book. Washington, D.C.: Federal Works Agency, Work Projects Administration, 1939.
- Ford, Richard. Wildlife. New York: Grove Press, 1990.
- Great Falls Public Schools (April 4, 2016). Facility Action Plan: Great Falls Public Schools (PDF) (Report). Great Falls, Mont.
- Great Falls Public Schools (September 15, 2016). Our Kids, Our Community and Our Future! (PDF) (Report).
- International Motion Picture Almanac. New York: Quigley Publications, 1941.
- National Park Service. The National Register of Historic Places. Washington, D.C.: U.S. Government Printing Office, 1976.
- Parry, Ellis Roberts. Montana Dateline. Guilford, Conn.: Twodot Press, 2001.
- Robison, Ken. Cascade County and Great Falls. Mount Pleasant, S.C.: Arcadia Publishing, 2011.
- Superintendent of Public Instruction. Biennial Report of the Superintendent of Public Instruction. Vol. II. Montana Department of Public Instruction. Helena, Mont.: Independent Publishing Co., 1903.
- Tape, Henry Aaron. Changing Secondary Education in the United States: Report on a Survey of Modifications of Secondary Education. Lansing, Mich.: Michigan State Board of Education 1939.
- Tuska, Jon, ed. "Introduction." Coffin Ranch. New York City: Leisure, 1998.
