= Montana State University (disambiguation) =

Montana State University is a public research university in Bozeman, Montana.

Montana State University may also refer to:

- Montana State University Billings, in Billings, Montana
- Montana State University–Northern, in Havre, Montana
- Great Falls College Montana State University, in Great Falls, Montana

== See also ==
- Montana University System
