= Lyles =

Lyles is a surname. Notable people with the surname include:

== Athletes ==
- Jordan Lyles (born 1990), American baseball player
- Josephus Lyles (born 1998), American track and field athlete
- Kevin Lyles (born 1973), American track and field athlete
- Lenny Lyles (1936–2011), American football player
- Lester Lyles (American football) (born 1962), American football player
- Nate Lyles (born 1985), American football player
- Noah Lyles (born 1997), American track and field athlete
- Robert Lyles (born 1961), American football player
- Trey Lyles (born 1995), Canadian–American basketball player

== Other ==
- A. C. Lyles (1918–2013), American film producer
- Aubrey Lyles (1883–1932), American songwriter, lyricist, and vaudeville performer
- Lester Lyles (born 1946), United States Air Force general

== See also ==
- Lyle's flying fox, a species of flying fox
- Lyle's Golden Syrup, a form of inverted sugar syrup
- Lyles, Tennessee, an unincorporated town near Nashville, Tennessee, United States
- Lyles Station, Indiana, an unincorporated town in Gibson County, Indiana, United States
