= Hubbard High School (Chicago) =

Location
- 6200 S. Hamlin Avenue; Chicago, Illinois 60629; United States; 41.7801°N 87.7186°W

Information
- School type: Public secondary
- Opened: 1929
- School district: Chicago Public Schools
- Principal: Angelica Altamirano
- Grades: 9–12
- Gender: Coed
- Enrollment: 1,819 (2022-23)
- Campus type: Urban
- Colors: Red; White; Grey; Black
- Athletics conference: Chicago Public League
- Mascot: Greyhound
- Team name: Greyhounds
- Accreditation: North Central Association of Colleges and Schools
- Website: hubbardhighschool.org

Hubbard High School is a public four-year high school located in the West Lawn neighborhood on the southwest side of Chicago, Illinois, United States. Hubbard is part of the Chicago Public Schools district. The school is named for American fur trader and insurance underwriter Gurdon Saltonstall Hubbard. As of 2017, Hubbard had an 82.9% five–year graduation rate. In 2017, the student population was 91% Hispanic and 96% "low income".

== Academics ==
=== Improvement ===
Hubbard was one of 16 schools nationwide selected by the College Board for inclusion in the EXCELerator School Improvement Model program beginning in the 2007–08 school year. The project was funded by the Bill & Melinda Gates Foundation.

=== IB Diploma Programme ===
Hubbard is an IB Diploma Programme high school. This comprehensive and challenging pre-university program for academically advanced and highly motivated students in grades 11 and 12 was implemented at Hubbard in 1998. Students at this school usually take IB exams in May. In the last examination session, students completed the following exams: Biology SL, English A1 HL, History HL, Math.Studies SL, Spanish A HL, Theory Knowl. TK and Visual Arts SL.

=== Advanced Placement and JROTC ===
Advanced Placement classes are available in six subjects: Biology, Calculus, English Language and Composition, Psychology, Spanish Language, and United States History. Students may substitute physical education classes with JROTC classes.

== Athletics ==
Hubbard competes in the Chicago Public League (CPL) and is a member of the Illinois High School Association (IHSA). The school sports teams are nicknamed the Greyhounds. The school is also known for their successful football team. Other sports programs offered by the school include: baseball, bowling, cheerleading, chess, cross country, pom-pom, soccer, softball, swimming, water-polo, soccer, track, volleyball, and wrestling.

In 1973, the boys baseball team, led by coach Tom Skubich, went 28-3 and won the Illinois state championship.

== Other programs ==
Hubbard High School is a participant in the Peer Health Exchange Program and receives educational support for its musical program from the Music of the Baroque professional chorus and band.

== Dress Code ==
Students must wear white, grey or black shirts and black bottoms. They may also wear their class shirts or any shirt produced by a Hubbard club/organization. Hair dying is allowed.

== History ==
Hubbard High School originally opened for the 1928/29 school year. In the late 1990s, Hubbard faced substantial overcrowding, but recent work has lowered its enrollment.

== Notable alumni ==
- Sean Cattouse (2007) – former NFL player
- Ethan Farmer (1993) - musician, songwriter, record producer
- Kelvin Hayden (2001) – former NFL player
- Othyus Jeffers (2003) – professional basketball player
- Aaron Johnson (2007) – professional basketball player
- Nate Lyles (2004) – former NFL player
- Michael Peña (1994) – actor
- Diante Watkins (2008) – professional basketball player

== Notable staff ==
- Lena McLin – composer, author, and minister; served as a music teacher at the school
