= Playing for Pizza =

2007 novel by John Grisham

- First edition cover
- Author: John Grisham
- Language: English
- Genre: Novel
- Publisher: Doubleday
- Publication date: September 25, 2007
- Publication place: United States
- Media type: Print (Hardcover, Paperback)
- ISBN: 0-385-52500-1
- OCLC: 154309113
- Dewey Decimal: 813/.54 22
- LC Class: PS3557.R5355 P56 2007

Playing for Pizza is a short novel by John Grisham, released on September 25, 2007. The novel is about an itinerant American football player who can no longer get work in the National Football League and whose agent signs a deal for him to play for the Parma Panthers in Parma, Italy in the Italian Football League.

== Synopsis ==
Rick Dockery is a third-string NFL quarterback for the Cleveland Browns, who throws three interceptions in 11 minutes in the AFC championship game, blowing a 17-point lead and resulting in the Browns missing their chance at their first-ever Super Bowl appearance. Carried off the field in a stretcher, he is cut from the team, vilified in the press, and faces additional legal troubles due to a questionable paternity lawsuit. His agent Arnie tries to find him work in the NFL, but no team will take him. Arnie manages to find him a starting position for the Parma Panthers of the Italian Football League for meager compensation. Rick accepts the job, glad to get away from the negative press and his legal troubles in the United States, but wary of living in Italy, where he doesn't know the language and where American football draws little attention. The Parma Panthers have only two other Americans playing on the team – halfback Slidell "Sly" Turner, who ends up leaving early in the season for family reasons, and safety Trey Colby, who later gets a season-ending injury. The Panthers head coach is American Sam Russo.

The Panthers win their first game with Rick, then lose a couple for various reasons, including the loss of Trey Colby to injury. Despite these problems, Italy and the team are growing on Rick, and he begins to feel some loyalty to them despite the fact that Arnie has found a more lucrative job offer with a CFL team. Rick decides instead to honor his contract with the Parma Panthers. With renewed resolve, a talented Italian wide receiver, and a new strategy, they win their remaining regular-season games, then advance to the playoffs and the Italian Super Bowl, winning a very close and hard-fought game against their rivals, the Bergamo Lions. Rick gets a new more lucrative offer from the Panthers for the next season, and while he is leaning towards staying in Italy with his new girlfriend Livvy and playing football for Parma, his latest concussion in the Italian Super Bowl gives him pause as to whether or not he should play again.

== Main characters ==
- Rick Dockery - Former NFL third string quarterback and Iowa alum who loses his NFL job and winds up playing in Italy for the Parma Panthers.
- Sam Russo - An American who coaches the Panthers.
- Arnie - Rick's agent, who found him the job in Italy playing with the Parma Panthers
- Slydell Turner - Running back from Colorado State, an American who quits early in the season.
- Trey Colby - A safety turned wide receiver who breaks his leg mid-season. Played at Ole Miss and was 3rd team All SEC.
- Fabrizio - Talented but egotistical Italian-born wide receiver, star receiver who needs to blend with his new QB.
- Giuseppe "Franco" Lazzarino - fullback of the Panthers and Italian judge who sorts out Rick's legal problems. Idolizes Franco Harris.
- Nino - Center, and co-owner of a local restaurant where Rick is introduced to traditional Italian cuisine.
- Maschi - Talented Italian linebacker who plays for rival team, the undefeated Bergamo Lions. Injured on the "Kill Maschi" play, designed by Rick in preparation for their first matchup. Idolizes Lawrence Taylor and demands to be called "L.T." like Taylor.
- Charley Cray - Writer for Cleveland Post, who attacks Rick (in print) following his disastrous performance in his last NFL game, then follows up with more nasty articles after Rick has relocated to Italy.
- Livvy Galloway - American college student studying in Italy, and love interest for Rick.
- Gabriella Ballini - Beautiful opera singer with whom Rick is infatuated.

== Reception ==
The book received positive reviews from USA Today, New York Daily News, and Publishers Weekly. As of 2024, Skydance Sports planned to develop an adaption of the novel, with Jason Moore and Nick Santora directing.

== See also ==
- Stadio Sergio Lanfranchi (original)
- Stadio Sergio Lanfranchi
