= Michael Rao =

American academic administrator (born 1967)

5th President of Virginia Commonwealth University
- Incumbent
- Assumed office 2009
- Preceded by: Eugene P. Trani

12th President of Central Michigan University
- In office 2000–2009
- Preceded by: Leonard E. Plachta
- Succeeded by: Kathy Wilbur

Personal details
- Born: 1966 (age 59–60) Boston, Massachusetts, U.S.
- Spouse: Monica Rao
- Education: University of South Florida (BS); University of Florida (PhD)
- Profession: Academic administrator
- Website: www.president.vcu.edu

Michael Rao is an American academic administrator who is the current president of Virginia Commonwealth University, a public university in downtown Richmond, Virginia. During his time as president, Rao has overseen increased enrollment, expansion of the university's facilities and record increases in sponsored research funding. Rao previously served as the president of Central Michigan University in Mount Pleasant, Michigan and Mission College in Santa Clara, California. Additionally, he served as the Chancellor of Montana State University–Northern.

== Early life and education ==
Rao, the son of a physician from Mumbai, India, was born in Boston, Massachusetts. At age eight, he moved with his mother to rural Pasco County, Florida, after the early death of his father, Suresh Rao.

He received his bachelor's degree in chemistry from the University of South Florida and his doctorate in Higher Education Administration from the University of Florida.

== Academic career ==
Rao has been an administrator for more than 30 years. In the late 1980s and early 1990s, Rao served in the private sector as a higher education academic program planner. In this role, he created master plans for the University of Washington system and the University of California. He also served as assistant to the president at the University of Florida, a member of the Association of American Universities (AAU).

In 1992, Rao became a dean at Mission College in Santa Clara, California, and became president of the college two years later. This move gave him the distinction of being the youngest college president in the country at that time. In 1998, he became chancellor of Montana State University–Northern, in Havre.

Rao was chosen to be president of Central Michigan University (CMU), a large public, research university in the year 2000. His work at Central Michigan University focused on interdisciplinary academic program development, economic development through commercialization of research, fundraising for the university, and outreach to the Central Michigan region. During his tenure and despite state budget cuts, CMU significantly increased faculty positions and research productivity, developed academic programs and improved performance. Under Rao's leadership, CMU gained approval to establish a medical school and M.D. degree program, partnering with large healthcare systems. When he left CMU in 2009, Rao was one of the three longest-serving presidents among Michigan's 15 public universities.

== Virginia Commonwealth University presidency ==
Rao was selected to be the president of Virginia Commonwealth University in 2009 and was officially installed as VCU's fifth president on October 14, 2011, in an inauguration ceremony at the Siegel Center.

In September 2019, it was reported that Rao had signed as the sole author of an opinion piece that he had not written. The January 2019 op-ed, printed in the Richmond Times-Dispatch, supported a private development in that city but had been ghostwritten by an employee of the private development. The executive editor of the Richmond Times-Dispatch stated that the newspaper would not have published the piece if it has known of its true origin. Rao's actions were also criticized by independent ethics experts.

In September 2024, VCU extended Rao's contract through June 2030, and VCU trustees unanimously voted to raise Rao's annual salary to $896,000, making him the fourth highest-paid university president in Virginia, behind presidents at the University of Virginia, George Mason University and the College of William & Mary.

== Personal life ==
Rao is married to Monica Rao, a professional watercolorist and graphic designer from Bengaluru. They have two sons.
