= Bitterroot College =

Public university in Hamilton, Montana, US

Coordinates: 46.24612°N 114.16812°W

University of Montana Bitterroot College
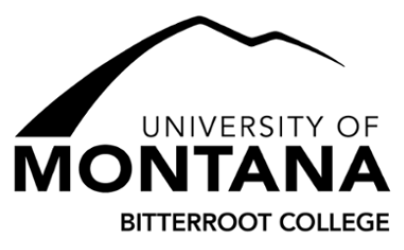
- Former names: Bitterroot College Program (2009–2012)
- Motto: Lux et Veritas (Latin)
- Motto in English: "Light and Truth"
- Type: Public university
- Established: 2009; 17 years ago
- Parent institution: Montana University System - The University of Montana System
- Accreditation: NWCCU
- President: Seth Bodnar
- Provost: Adrea Lawrence
- Students: 145 (Spring 2024)
- Location: Hamilton, Montana, United States
- Colors: Maroon and silver
- Nickname: Grizzlies and Lady Griz
- Mascot: Monte
- Website: www.umt.edu/bitterroot-college

University of Montana Bitterroot College (UM Bitterroot College) is a campus of the University of Montana located in Hamilton, Montana, United States. The campus is part of the Montana University System (MUS) two-year college system. In operation since 2009, the program offers Associate of Arts and Associate of Science degrees in addition to various certificate programs.

== History ==
UM Bitterroot College was established in the fall of 2009 as the Bitterroot College Program (BCP) by the Bitterroot College Program Steering Committee. The committee was formed in the spring of 2009 upon the recommendation of the Montana Board of Regents after the Montana Legislature declined to establish a community college district in Ravalli County. In 2021, the Montana Legislature reconsidered the decision, leading to the establishment of the Bitterroot Valley Community College District. The college was initially located at the Ravalli Entrepreneurship Center in Hamilton, later moving to its current location in the Westview Building in 2015.

== Academics ==
UM Bitterroot College currently offers Associate of Arts, Associate of Science, Associate of Applied Science, Certificate of Applied Science, and Certificate of Technical Studies programs:

- Associate of Arts Degree (A.A.)
- Associates of Science Degree (A.S.)
- Accounting Fundamentals (C.A.S.)
- Addiction Counseling (C.A.S.)
- Clinical Medical Assistant (C.T.S.)
- Cybersecurity (C.T.S.)
- Associate of Arts and Science Degree Programs
- Paramedicine (A.A.S.)
- Associate of Applied Science Degree Programs
- Medical Laboratory Technician (A.A.S.)
- Legal Studies (C.A.S.)
- Medical Information Technology (A.A.S.)
- Medical Claims Specialist (C.T.S.)
- Medical Reception (C.A.S.)
- Business & Technology
- Certificate Programs
- General Studies Certificate
- Surgery Technology (A.A.S.)
