= Diante Watkins =

American basketball player

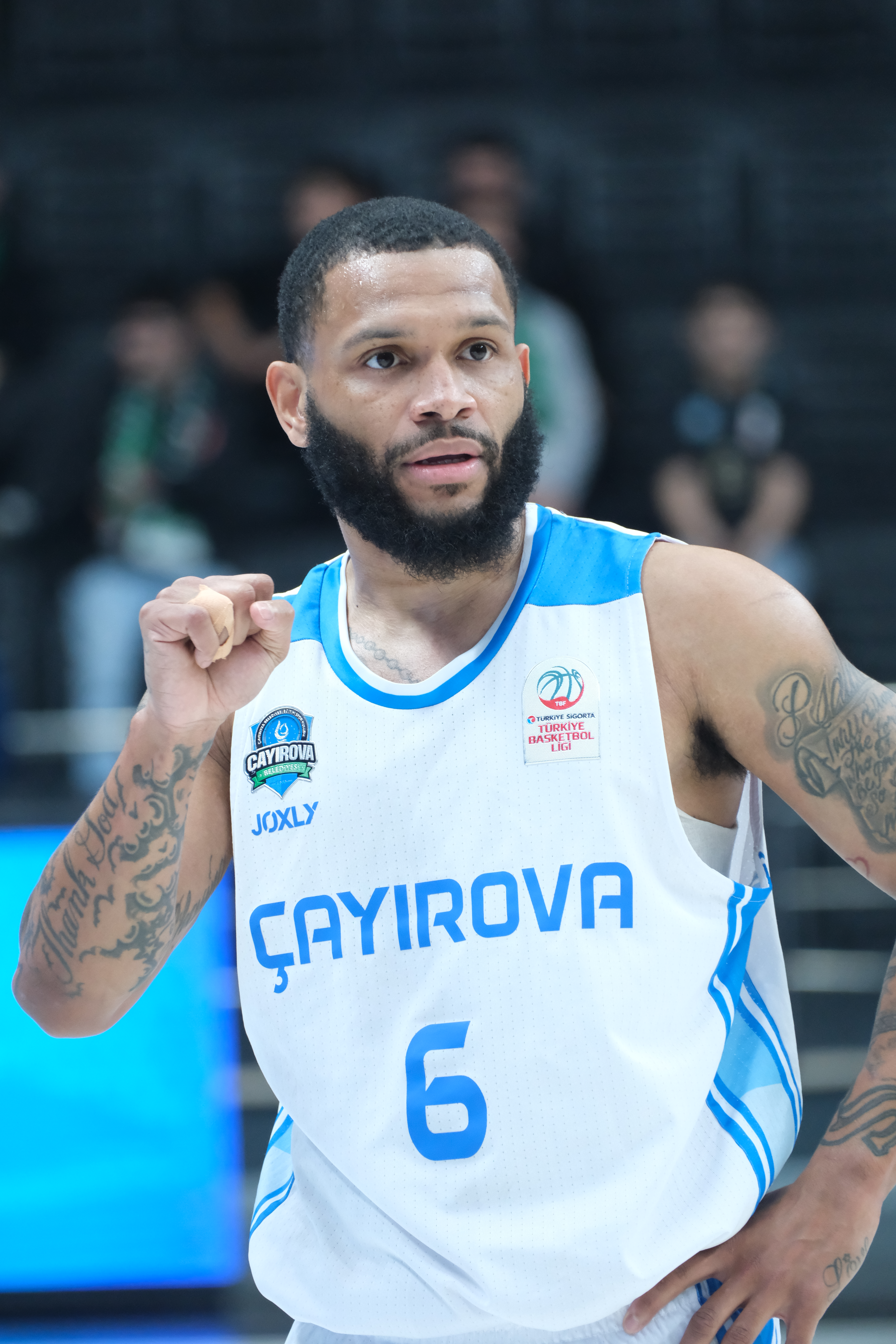

No. 6 – Ormanspor
- Position: Point guard
- League: TBL

Personal information
- Born: July 5, 1990 (age 36) Chicago, Illinois
- Listed height: 5 ft 9 in (1.75 m)

Career information
- College: Richard J. Daley (2008–2010); Robert Morris (Illinois) (2010–2012)
- NBA draft: 2012: undrafted
- Playing career: 2012–present

Career history
- 2012–2013: Chicago Redline
- 2013–2015: SC Rist Wedel
- 2015: Chicago Blues
- 2016–2017: Nürnberg Falcons
- 2017–2018: SOMB
- 2018–2019: Tours
- 2019–2020: Gemlik Basketbol
- 2020–2021: Mamak Belediyesi
- 2021–2022: Manisa BB
- 2022: Czarni Słupsk
- 2022–2023: A.S. Ramat HaSharon
- 2023: Samsunspor
- 2023–2025: Çayırova Belediyespor
- 2025–2026: Kipaş İstiklal Basketbol
- 2026–present: Ormanspor

Career highlights
- Turkish Basketball First League champion (2022, 2023); MPBA Champion (2016); MPBA Playoff MVP (2016); German ProB Player of the Year (2015); 2× First-team NAIA All-American (2011, 2012); CCAC Player of the Year (2012); NJCAA All-American (2010)

Diante Levante Watkins (born July 5, 1990) is an American professional basketball player for Ormanspor of the Türkiye Basketbol Ligi (TBL).

== College career ==
Watkins, a graduate of Hubbard High School, attended Richard J. Daley College, earning National Junior College Athletic Association All-America Third Team honors in the 2009–10 season. He subsequently enrolled at Robert Morris University Illinois. Watkins was the 2011–12 Chicagoland Collegiate Athletic Conference (CCAC) Player of the Year and received NAIA All-America First Team distinction twice.

== Professional career ==
In 2012–13, Watkins played for the Chicago Redline in the Independent Basketball Association and then took his game overseas. His first two years in Germany were spent at ProB side SC Rist Wedel. In 2014–15, playing under coach Michael Claxton, Watkins was named ProB Player of the Year. Prior to the 2015–16 campaign, German ProA team Bayer Giants Leverkusen announced that Watkins has signed for the upcoming season. However, due to a knee injury, Watkins was unable to play for the Leverkusen side.

After recovering from the injury, Watkins joined the Chicago Blues of the Midwest Professional Basketball Association (MPBA). He won the 2016 MPBA championship title and was named Playoff Most Valuable Player (MVP). Representing the NetScouts Basketball USA All-Stars, Watkins won a four-nations tournament in China in May 2016. Averaging 18.3 points, 3.5 rebounds, 6.3 assists and 3.0 steals in eight games which were held in Yunyang, Dazu and Shenzhen, Watkins received all-tournament MVP honors.

He then headed back to Germany to join ProA outfit Nürnberg Falcons BC. At Nürnberg, Watkins averaged 17.1 points and 4.7 assists per outing.

Watkins continued his career in France, playing one year each for NM1 clubs Boulogne and Tours. He then headed to Turkey in 2019. In the 2019–20 season, he averaged 23.2 points, 7.8 assists and 4.6 rebounds per contest for Gemlik. In 2021–22, he won the Türkiye Basketbol Ligi championship with Manisa Büyükşehir Belediyespor. Watkins averaged 18.6 points per game en route to the title.

On July 15, 2022, Watkins put pen to paper on a contract with Czarni Słupsk of the Polish Basketball League (PLK). Watkins averaged 11.1 points and 6.6 assists per contest in PLK play. He parted company with Czarni Słupsk on November 17, 2022, the team management was not satisfied with his performances. On December 2, 2022, Watkins signed with A.S. Ramat HaSharon of the Israeli National League, the second-tier of Israeli basketball. He put up averages of 20.6 points, 7 assists and 4.8 rebounds per game for Ramat HaSharon, on April 24, 2023, Watkins agreed to a deal with Samsunspor of the Türkiye Basketbol Ligi (TBL). He helped the team win the 2022–23 championship, averaging 16.8 points, 6.1 assists and 5.2 rebounds a contest.

On November 3, 2023 Watkins was signed by Çayırova Belediyespor of the Türkiye Basketbol Ligi. Watkins joined TBL newcomer Kipaş İstiklal Basketbol in July 2025. After having averaged 18.9 points per game in the 2025-26 campaign, he moved to fellow TBL side Ormanspor in June 2026.
