= Eugene P. Trani =

University president (born 1939)

4th President of Virginia Commonwealth University
- In office 1990–2009
- Preceded by: Edmund F. Ackell
- Succeeded by: Michael Rao

Personal details
- Born: November 2, 1939 (age 86) Brooklyn, New York
- Spouse: Lois E. Trani
- Education: University of Notre Dame (B.A., 1961); Indiana University (M.A., 1963; Ph.D., 1966)
- Profession: Educator, administrator and historian
- Website: www.eugenetrani.vcu.edu

Eugene P. Trani (born November 2, 1939, in Brooklyn, New York) is a historian, educator, academic administrator, and fourth president of Virginia Commonwealth University in Richmond, Virginia, serving as president from 1990 - 2009.

Trani received a Bachelor of Arts in history from the University of Notre Dame in 1961. He earned a Master of Arts in 1963 and Ph.D. in 1966, both from Indiana University; his doctoral advisor was the historian Robert H. Ferrell. Trani began his academic career in the Department of History at Ohio State University, teaching there from 1965 to 1967. From 1967 to 1976, Trani was a faculty member in the Department of History at Southern Illinois University, Carbondale, and was tenured there in 1971, becoming full Professor in 1975. From 1976 to 1980, Trani served as Assistant Vice President for Academic Affairs at the University of Nebraska–Lincoln. In 1980, Dr. Trani was appointed Vice Chancellor for Academic Affairs and Professor of History at the University of Missouri-Kansas City, and served in that position until 1986. From 1986 to 1990, Trani was Vice President for Academic Affairs of the University of Wisconsin System, and a tenured Professor of History at the University of Wisconsin-Madison. In 1981, Trani served as Senior Fulbright Lecturer at Moscow State University in American History.

Trani became Virginia Commonwealth University's fourth president in 1990, and served as President of VCU and the VCU Health System until 2009. Trani had four short-term visiting research leaves during his presidency: at the University of London in 1995, at St. John's, Cambridge in 1998, at University College Dublin in 2002, and at Lincoln College, Oxford in 2005. The research focus of the leaves was twofold: research on his books on American foreign policy, and also the intersection of university and community outreach around economic development.

Trani is a member of the Council on Foreign Relations, New York, and the International Institute for Strategic Studies, London. In 1991, he was awarded an Honorary Doctor of Laws Degree from Virginia Union University, Richmond, VA; in 2009, the Honorary Doctor of Science Degree, St. Petersburg University, Russia, 2009; and in 2009, the Honorary Doctor of Humane Letters Degree, Virginia Commonwealth University.

== President of Virginia Commonwealth University ==
Trani was appointed the fourth president of Virginia Commonwealth University on July 1, 1990, and served as president until June 30, 2009. He also served as president and chair of the board of directors of the VCU Health System (now VCU Health), and held a tenured appointment as Professor of History. Trani continues to serve VCU as president emeritus and university distinguished professor,

In his first address to the university community in 1990, among the university-wide goals Trani set forth for VCU during his presidency, two were particularly distinctive. One was at home: an urban university, with no walls or fences, VCU reached out to all of its surrounding communities, bringing together the assets of the university, on behalf of community interests. The other was abroad: sixteen international partnerships—in Europe, China, Brazil, Mexico and Qatar—were established and flourished.

After his retirement as president, along with teaching in VCU's Honors College and continuing his research and writing, Trani created an independent, nonprofit think tank, Richmond's Future. From 2010–2016, Richmond's Future conducted fourteen research studies on topics of importance to the future of the City of Richmond and the Region. The culminating Final Report was published in the Richmond Times-Dispatch on February 21, 2016, and a final meeting of community, business and government leaders convened on April 7, 2016.

== Selected books ==
- Annotated Charles Sawyer's Concerns of a Conservative Democrat (Carbondale: Southern Illinois University Press, 1968, 399 pp., of which 51 pp. are footnotes).
- The Treaty of Portsmouth: An Adventure in American Diplomacy (Lexington: University of Kentucky Press, 1969, 194 pp.). Reprinted in paperback edition, University Press of Kentucky, 2014.
- The Presidency of Warren G. Harding (Lawrence: The Regents Press of Kansas, 1977; second printing, 1985; third printing, 1989; 232 pp., a volume in the American Presidency Series), co-authored with David Wilson.
- The First Cold War: The Legacy of Woodrow Wilson in U.S.-Soviet Relations,

co-authored with Donald E. Davis (Columbia: University of Missouri Press, 2002, 329 pp.). Published in Russian (Moscow, Russia: Olma-Press Publishing House, 2002, 480 pp.). Published in Chinese (Beijing, China: Peking University Press, 2007, 356 pp.).

- Distorted Mirrors: Americans and Their Relations with Russia and China in the Twentieth Century, co-authored with Donald E. Davis (Columbia: University of Missouri Press, 2009, 461 pp.). Published in Russian (Moscow, Russia: Vagrius Publishers, 2009, 912 pp.). Published in Spanish (Cordoba, Spain: University of Cordoba Press, 2009, 660 pp.). Published in Chinese (Taipei, Taiwan, Republic of China: Showwe Publishing, 2014, 514 pp.).
- The Indispensable University: Higher Education, Economic Development and the Knowledge Economy, co-authored with Robert Holsworth (Lanham, Maryland: Rowman & Littlefield Publishers, 2010, paperback edition, 2013, 281 pp., published jointly with the American Council on Education).
- The Reporter Who Knew Too Much: Harrison E. Salisbury and The New York Times, co-authored with Donald E. Davis, (Lanham, Maryland: Rowman & Littlefield Publishers, 2012, 283 pp.).
