= Michael Claxton =

American basketball player and coach

Michael Brandon Claxton (born December 10, 1976) is an American professional basketball coach and former professional player.

== Playing career ==
Claxton attended Chester High School in Chester, Montana until 1995, before playing college basketball at Montana Tech, MSU Billings and Montana State University–Northern in the NAIA. Following graduation in 2001, he embarked on a professional career, which included stints with a number of lower-league clubs in Germany (TuS Iserlohn, TV Langen, BG Zehlendorf, Krefeld Panthers, SC Rist Wedel, MTV Stuttgart and UBC Hannover) as well as stints in the International Basketball League (Tacoma Thunder, Tacoma Jazz and Tacoma Tide).

== Coaching career ==
In 2006, Claxton joined the Seattle Academy, serving as PE teacher and head boys’ varsity basketball coach. Under his guidance, the team won four Emerald City League titles, including the school's first-ever boys’ basketball league title in 2009. In 2011, Claxton earned Emerald City League Coach of the Year honors. In the summer of 2013, he served as head coach at the Jamal Crawford Summer Pro-Am Basketball League.

He left Seattle Academy in 2014 and was named head coach of SC Rist Wedel of the German ProB league. In the 2014–15 season, he led the Wedel team to the ProB finals, where they fell short to Oldenburg. Claxton's silver winning team included Diante Watkins who garnered ProB Player of the Year honors (by eurobasket.com) that year. In his second season at the helm (2015–16), his Wedel team found itself in a fight to stay in the ProB, Claxton guided the team to the top spot in the relegation round. In 2016, playing for Wedel, he won the German senior national championship (for players age 35 and older).

Prior to the 2016–17 season, he was appointed assistant for Turów Zgorzelec of the PLK, Poland's top flight of professional basketball. Claxton was promoted to head coach in November 2017, after the position was vacated by Mathias Fischer who left for German club Walter Tigers Tübingen. He guided the Zgorzelec team to the PLK playoffs, his contract expired at the conclusion of the 2017–18 season and was not renewed.

In July 2018, Claxton was named head coach of BC Prievidza of the Slovak Basketball League (SBL). After four straight losses and no continued salary payments from BC Prievidza, he personally resigned from his position on December 22, 2018. During his tenure, Prievidza had a record of eight wins and eight losses in the SBL. In 2020, he was named the first head boys basketball coach at the newly founded Bozeman Gallatin High School in Bozeman, Montana. Claxton guided his team to the school's first ever Class AA boys basketball state championship in 2024 and subsequently was named Eastern AA Coach of the Year.

In May 2026, Claxton was appointed as the new head coach of the University of Providence men’s basketball program.
