= Brian Salonen =

American football player (born 1961)

No. 89
- Position: Tight end / Linebacker

Personal information
- Born: July 29, 1961 (age 65); Glasgow, Montana, U.S.
- Listed height: 6 ft 3 in (1.91 m)
- Listed weight: 229 lb (104 kg)

Career information
- High school: Great Falls (Great Falls, Montana)
- College: Montana
- NFL draft: 1984: 10th round, 278th overall pick

Career history
- Dallas Cowboys (1984–1987)

Awards and highlights
- Division I-AA All-American (1983); All-Big Sky (1983); 2× Second-team All-Big Sky (1981, 1982)

Career NFL statistics
- Games played: 32
- Stats at Pro Football Reference

Brian Scott Salonen (born July 29, 1961) is an American former professional football player who was a tight end and linebacker for the Dallas Cowboys of the National Football League (NFL). He played college football for the Montana Grizzlies.

== Early life ==
Salonen attended Great Falls High School, where he was an All-state football player that played on offense and defense (linebacker). In basketball, he received both All-state and All-American honors.

He accepted a football scholarship from the University of Montana, where he played as a tight end and also served as team's long snapper.

In 1983, he established seven school receiving records, after posting 68 receptions for 832 receiving yards (led the conference) and 9 touchdowns, including six games with more than 100 yards receiving. He also set Division I-AA records for tight ends with 6.8 catches per game in a season, 151 career receptions and 1,882 career receiving yards. His 68 receptions in a season tied Dan Ross' Division I-AA mark for tight ends.

He finished his career as the school's all-time leading receiver, with 151 receptions for 1,882 yards and 12 receiving touchdowns, all school records. He also made the conference's All-Academic list three years in a row.

In 2003, Sports Illustrated named Salonen as the 17th greatest athlete in Montana sports history. In 2016, he was inducted into the Montana Football Hall of Fame.

== Professional career ==
Salonen was selected by the Dallas Cowboys in the 10th round (278th overall) of the 1984 NFL draft. He was also selected by the Houston Gamblers of the United States Football League in the ninth round (188th overall) of the 1984 USFL draft. As a rookie, he made the team as the third-string tight end and played mainly on special teams.

In 1985, he was converted into an outside linebacker before the start of training camp. He was the backup to Mike Hegman, but still remained a reserve at tight end and as a core special teams player. His only game action at linebacker was in place of an injured Hegman during the second half against the St. Louis Cardinals.

On August 19, 1986, he was placed on the injured reserve list. He retired on May 15, 1988, after failing to recover from a shoulder injury he suffered in November 1986 and spending two years on the injured reserve.

== Personal life ==
Salonen works as a financial advisor and was the Montana State President for NAIFA (The National Association of Insurance and Financial Advisors).
