= Garrison Courtney =

Scam artist and former U.S. government official

Chief of Public Affairs of the Drug Enforcement Administration
- In office 2005–2009
- President: George W. Bush
- Administrator: Karen Tandy; Michele Leonhart

Personal details
- Born: Garrison Kenneth Courtney; 1975/1976 Philippines
- Education: University of Montana (BA)

Military service
- Branch/service: United States Army

Garrison Kenneth Courtney (born 1975/1976) is an American former government official who served as the Chief of Public Affairs for the Drug Enforcement Administration from 2005 to 2009. In June 2020, Courtney pleaded guilty to wire fraud after it was uncovered that he had posed as a Central Intelligence Agency officer for four years as a part of an ongoing government contract scheme. In October 2020 he received a seven-year prison sentence.

== Early life and education ==
Courtney was born in the Philippines, the son of an officer in the United States Air Force. He was raised in Great Falls, Montana, where he attended Great Falls High School. Courtney attended Montana State University–Northern in 1996, where he served as the editor of The NoMoCo, the school paper.

Courtney served in the United States Army, and graduated from the University of Montana with a degree in broadcast journalism in 2000.

== Career ==
Prior to working for the DEA, Courtney was the Seattle District public affairs and community outreach director with the Immigration and Naturalization Service (INS) for Northern Idaho, Washington and British Columbia. After the INS merged into the United States Department of Homeland Security, Courtney moved to Washington, D.C., serving as a senior spokesperson for the Department of Homeland Security. Courtney also worked for Rep. Katherine Harris (R-Florida), as the Communications Director and Homeland Security Legislative Assistant in 2004.

Courtney has also worked as a reporter and television weather anchor for CBS affiliates in several states, including KPAX-TV in Missoula, Montana and KVAL-TV in Eugene, Oregon.

After leaving the DEA, Courtney worked as a producer for TMZ on TV. At the time of his arrest in 2020, Courtney worked for Huntington Ingalls Industries in Tampa, Florida, using the alias "Baer Pierson."

=== Wire fraud ===
In June 2020, Courtney pleaded guilty to wire fraud involving his posing as a CIA agent in a scheme that spanned from 2012 to 2016. He swindled at least a dozen companies out of over US$4.4 million by convincing them they would receive lucrative government contracts funded by the black budget in exchange for putting him on their payroll as a cover for his job as a spy. To bolster his credibility, he developed a fake backstory, claiming that he was a U.S. Army veteran from the Gulf War who had killed hundreds in combat, suffered from lung injuries from smoke in Iraq's oil fields, and was the assassination target of a foreign intelligence service that tried to poison him with ricin. On October 28, 2020, he was sentenced to seven years in prison.
