= Ryan Christian =

American gridiron football player (born 1986)

No. 18
- Position: Wide receiver

Personal information
- Born: January 7, 1986 (age 40); Aledo, Texas, U.S.
- Listed height: 5 ft 11 in (1.80 m)
- Listed weight: 188 lb (85 kg)

Career information
- High school: Aledo (Texas)
- College: TCU

Career history
- 2010: Toronto Argonauts

Ryan Christian (born January 7, 1986) is an American former professional football wide receiver and running back. He played college football at Texas Christian University (TCU), and professionally in the Canadian Football League (CFL) with the Toronto Argonauts, and for the Parma Panthers in the Italian Football League.

== Early life ==
Son of Richey and Jodi Christian, Ryan was born in Aledo, Texas on January 7, 1986. He attended and played for Aledo High School. He lettered four times in football and track & field, twice in soccer, and once in basketball. Christian carried 305 times for 2,166 yards, good for a 7.1 per carry average, and 28 touchdowns as a senior. He was en route to all-area, district co-MVP and all-state honors; he was also an academic all-state selection. Christian helped his team to the state semifinals, was a first-team all-district back, and was the Parker County Offensive MVP as a junior after rushing for 1,342 yards. He was named Newcomer of the Year as a freshman, finished his prep career with 4,826 yards on 767 carries with 55 touchdowns, and also caught 69 passes for 1,245 yards and six scores. Christian returned one punt and one kickoff for a touchdown, accounting for 63 career TDs. He was the 2004 Newcomer of the Year in soccer, and his soccer team finished as the state runner-up in 2005, which was the year he was redshirted as a freshman.

== College career ==
Ryan played college football for Texas Christian University from 2006–2009. His first collegiate reception went for six yards against San Diego State, and had a catch in the Air Force game. Christian had a 1-yard rush at Baylor in his collegiate debut. He carried for three yards the following week versus UC Davis, and totaled two tackles on special teams in the 12–3 win over Texas Tech.

In 2007, Christian moved from wide receiver to tailback during preseason camp. He had a career-best six receptions for 74 yards, including a season-long 25-yard grab at Air Force. He had 12 rushes for 42 yards while catching three passes for 30 yards in the 20–13 Texas Bowl win over Houston. Christian carried 12 times for 47 yards including a 2-yard touchdown in the 45–33 victory at San Diego State to close the regular season. He added two receptions for 17 yards against the Aztecs, had a 12-yard scoring run as part of 40 yards on nine attempts in the season-opening 27–0 win over Baylor, added two receptions versus the Bears, and ran for 41 yards on 10 carries to go with three receptions at Texas. Christian made his first collegiate start in the 21–7 win over SMU.

In 2008, he played in all 13 games with three starts, and moved back to his original position of tailback after beginning fall camp at wide receiver. Christian was a key part of TCU's offense. He ranked second in receptions (30), third in all-purpose yards (841) and fourth in rushing (386 yards). He rushed for a career-best 82 yards on 19 carries while adding four receptions for 21 yards in the 31–14 win over Stanford.

In 2009 in his senior year, he placed fourth on TCU with 24 receptions.posted his first two receiving touchdowns, 44 and 29 yards, en route to his first career 100-yard game. He totaled three receptions for 106 yards on the sunny afternoon at Qualcomm Stadium, had a 16-yard scoring reception against Utah, totaled a season-best five receptions for 48 yards against the Utes, and also had five catches for 40 yards in the Tostitos Fiesta Bowl versus Boise State. Christian contributed three catches in the 14–10 win at Clemson. He also saw action at tailback during the season, rushing for 66 yards on 14 carries, and ran for a season-best 28 yards on seven attempts in the opener at Virginia. He had a season-long 23-yard gain against UNLV, and after, added two receptions versus the Rebels. He had two catches at Wyoming, including a 29-yard pick up. Christian averaged 25.4 yards on five kickoff returns for the season and had a career-long 43-yard kickoff return in the New Mexico game.

== Professional career ==
After graduating TCU, Christian signed with the Toronto Argonauts of the Canadian Football League (CFL). In the 2010 season, Christian caught 9 passes for 103 yards and returned 19 kickoffs for 458 yards, Avg 24.1, with a record 110 yard return for a touchdown. .

In 2012, Christian signed with the Parma Panthers that is based in Italy. Christian, who is extremely strong in his faith, said he does not have any desire to play in the NFL in the near-future and is "perfectly happy where The Lord has [him]" with the Parma Panthers. In the 2013 season for Parma, Christian scored 9 touchdowns with 521 rushing yards, 351 receiving yards, and 164 return yards. Christian helped the Panthers to win the Italian Bowl championship defeating the Milano Seamen 51–28.
