= List of presidents of Virginia Commonwealth University =

This list of presidents of Virginia Commonwealth University includes all presidents of VCU.

Name	Tenure
Warren W. Brandt	1969–1974
T. Edward Temple	1975–1977
Edmund F. Ackell	1978–1990
Eugene P. Trani	1990–2009
Michael Rao	2009–Present
