= Warren W. Brandt =

American university president

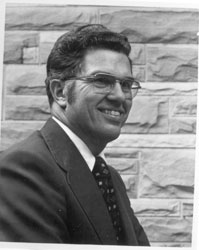

11th President of Southern Illinois University Carbondale
- In office 1974–1979
- Preceded by: David R. Derge
- Succeeded by: Hiram H. Lesar

1st President of Virginia Commonwealth University
- In office June 1969 – October 1974
- Succeeded by: T. Edward Temple

Personal details
- Born: Warren William Brandt; July 11, 1923; Lansing, Michigan, U.S.
- Died: July 4, 2017 (aged 93); Henrico, Virginia, U.S.
- Education: Michigan State University; University of Illinois
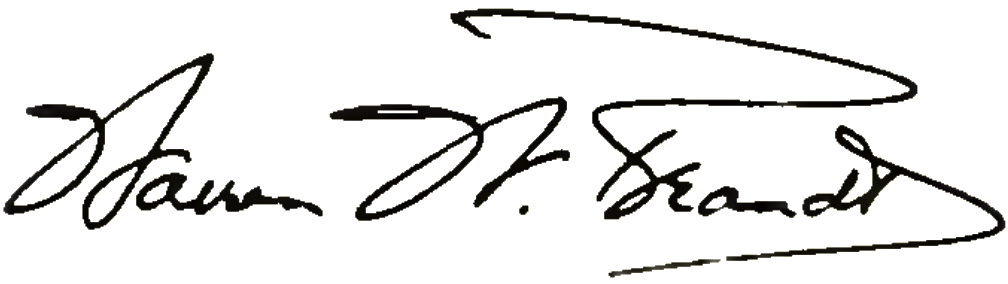
- Signature

Military service
- Branch/service: United States Army
- Battles/wars: World War II

Warren William Brandt (July 11, 1923 – July 4, 2017) was an American academic. He was the first president of Virginia Commonwealth University, serving from 1969 to 1974, and the eleventh president of Southern Illinois University Carbondale, from 1974 to 1979.
