= Masonic Temple (Great Falls, Montana) =

- U.S. National Register of Historic Places
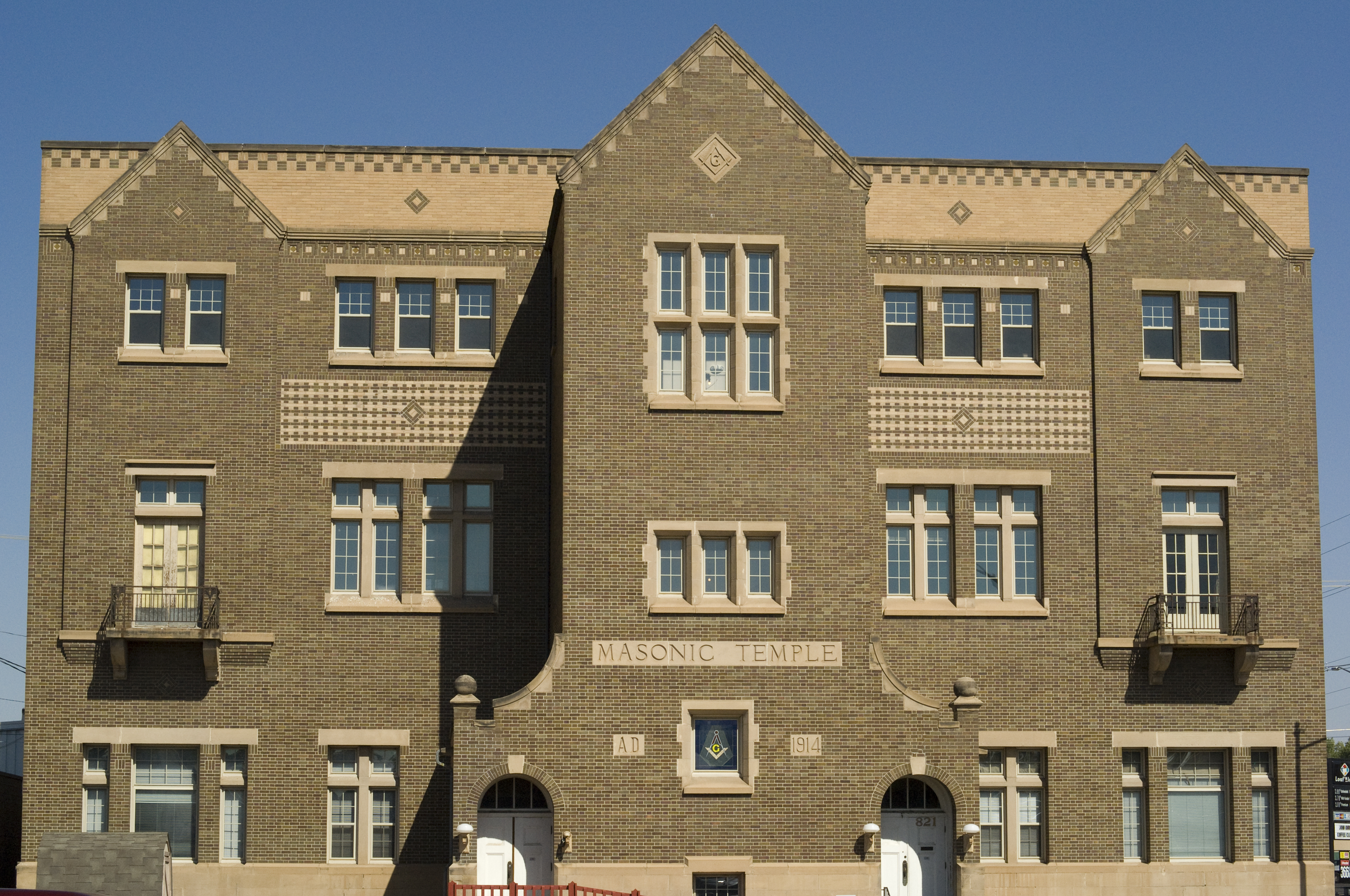
- Masonic Temple in Great Falls, Montana

- Location within Montana Location within the United States
- Location: 821 Central Ave., Great Falls, Montana
- Coordinates: 47.5056435°N 111.2924503°W
- Area: less than one acre
- Built: 1914; 112 years ago
- Architect: Van Teylingen, Johannes; Mowbray, Alex
- Architectural style: Tudor Revival
- NRHP reference No.: 00001568
- Added to NRHP: December 28, 2000

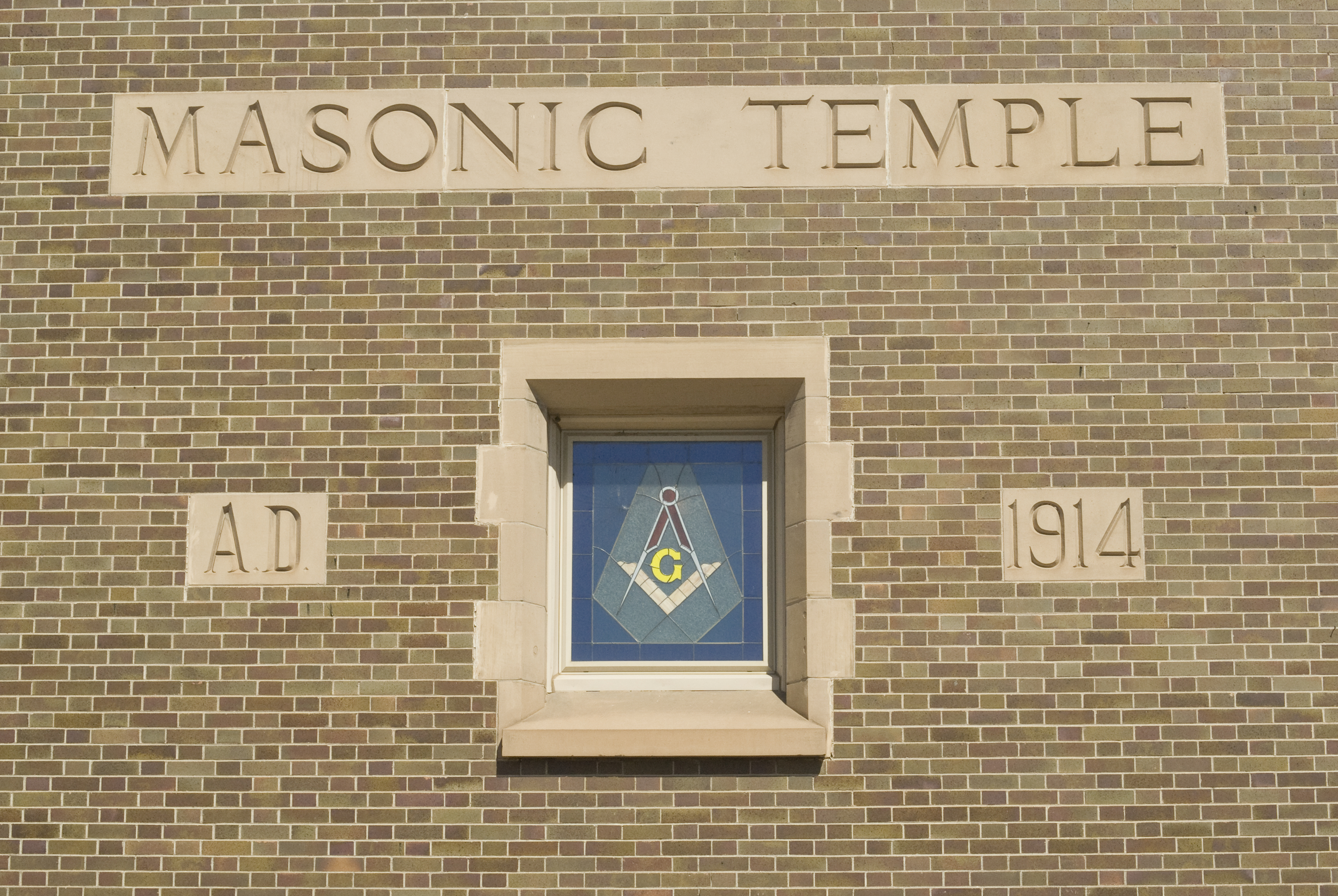
Close-up view of the front of the Masonic Temple in Great Falls, Montana

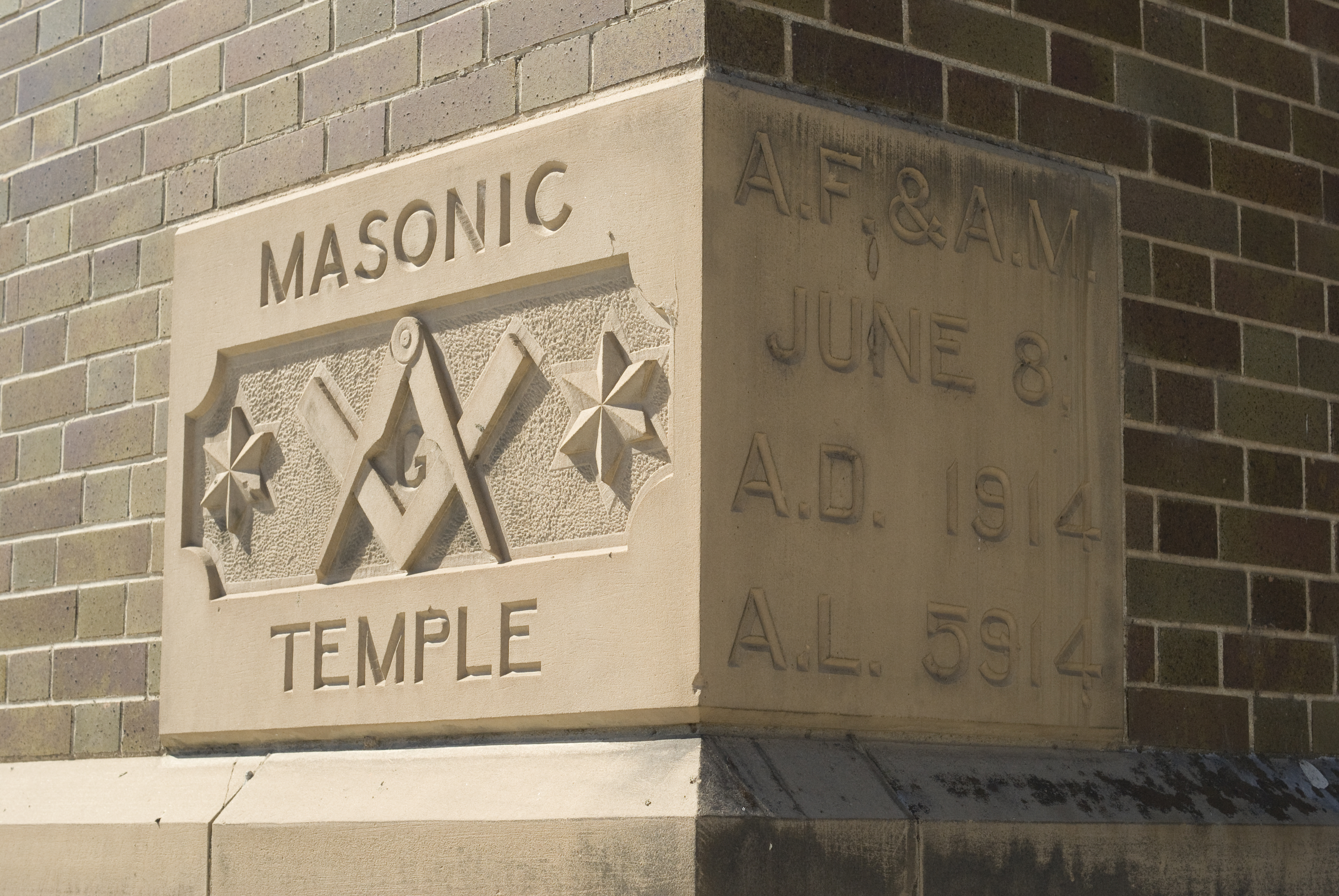
Cornerstone at the Masonic Temple in Great Falls, Montana

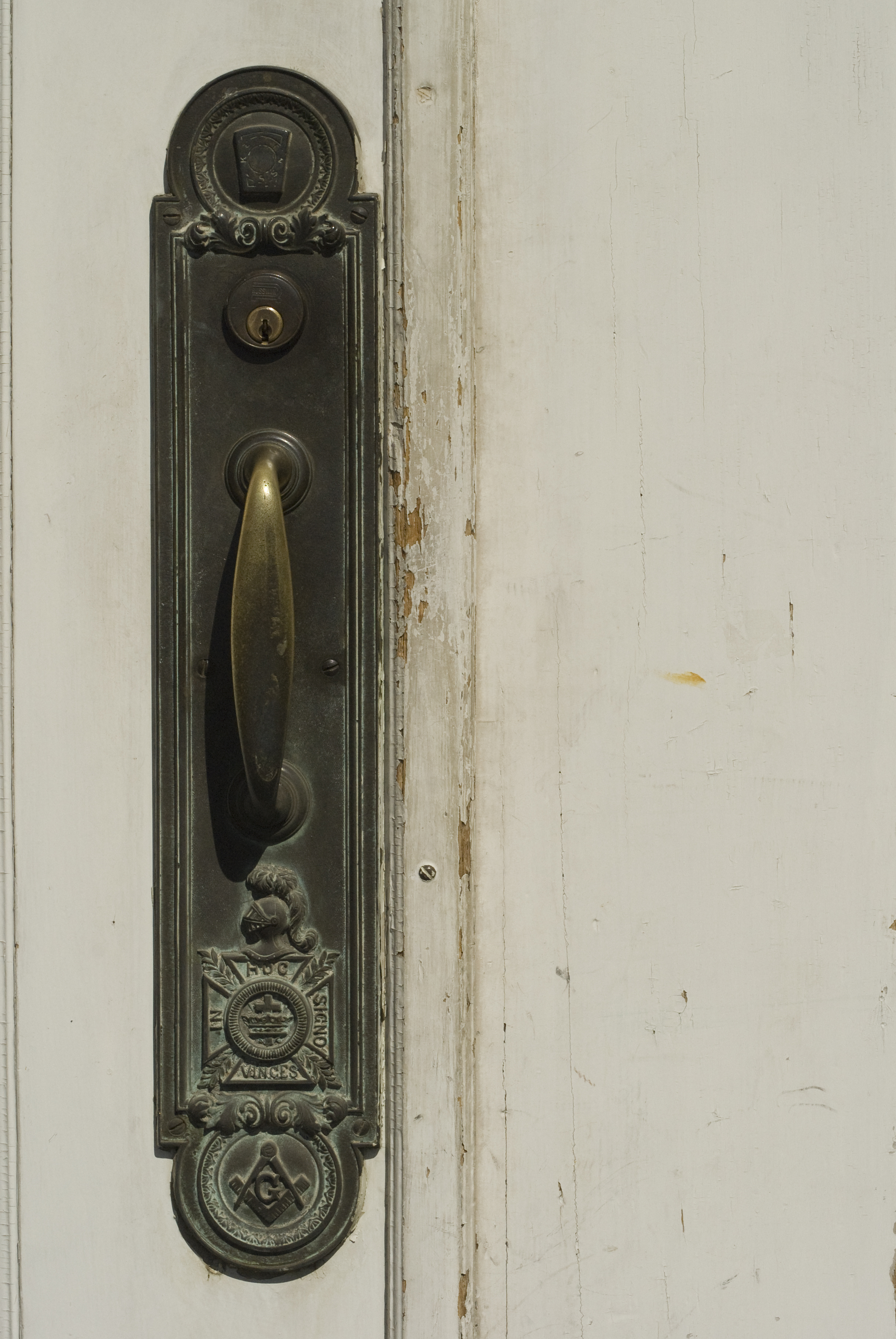
Door handle with symbolism on the Masonic Temple in Great Falls, Montana

The Masonic Temple in Great Falls, Montana is a building from 1914. It was listed on the National Register of Historic Places in 2000.

Address is 821 Central Avenue, Great Falls, Montana.

Three active Blue Lodges meet in the building throughout the year including: Cascade Lodge No. 34, Euclid Lodge No. 58, and Delta Lodge No. 128.
