= Nate Lyles =

American football player (born 1985)

Profile
- Position: Safety

Personal information
- Born: October 8, 1985 (age 41); Chicago, Illinois, U.S.
- Listed height: 6 ft 0 in (1.83 m)
- Listed weight: 199 lb (90 kg)

Career information
- High school: Chicago (IL) Hubbard
- College: Virginia
- NFL draft: 2008: undrafted

Career history
- New York Jets (2008); Parma Panthers (2011)

Nathan Jahmal Lyles (born October 8, 1985) is an American former football safety. He was signed by the New York Jets as an undrafted free agent in 2008. He played for the Parma Panthers in the Italian Football League (IFL). Lyles played college football at Virginia.

== Professional career ==
=== New York Jets ===
Lyles was signed by the Jets in May 2008. Lyles was later waived by the Jets on July 23, 2008 when cornerback Ahmad Carroll was signed. He was re-signed on July 31. He was then waived by the team on August 18, 2008.

=== Parma Panthers ===
Lyles signed with the Panthers on February 15, 2011. On July 9, 2011 the Parma Panthers defeated the Bologna Warriors to win their second straight Italian Football League Super Bowl championship. The Panthers also played in the European Football League / Eurobowl playoffs where they lost to the Calanda Broncos from Switzerland in the second round.
