= Great Falls College Montana State University =

Community college in Great Falls, Montana, U.S.

Coordinates: 47°29′10″N 111°16′12″W

Great Falls College–Montana State University
- Other name: Great Falls College
- Motto: Home of the River Otters
- Type: Public community college
- Established: 1969
- Parent institution: Montana University System
- Academic affiliations: Space-grant
- Dean: Stephanie Erdmann
- Students: 1,352 FTE, 4,792 headcount
- Location: Great Falls, Montana, United States
- Colors: Blue
- Mascot: River Otters
- Website: www.gfcmsu.edu

Great Falls College–Montana State University is a public community college in Great Falls, Montana. It is affiliated with the Montana State University System and offers Associate of Applied Science (AAS), Associate of Science (AS), and Associate of Arts (AA) degrees as well as several Information Technology Certifications.

== History ==
Great Falls College–Montana State University was established in 1969 along with several other vocational centers at the request of the Montana Legislature to offer training in vocational and technical fields such as adult education, nursing and dental assistant. The Great Falls Vocational-Technical Center was completed in December 1976 and was accredited by the Northwest Association of Schools and Colleges three years later. When the Montana Board of Regents of Higher Education restructured the state's colleges and universities with the goal of streamlining the states higher education in the wake of decreased state funding, the Great Falls Vo-Tech Center was placed under the administration of the Montana State University system and was renamed Montana State University College of Technology – Great Falls.

== Academics ==
The college offers Associate of Applied Science (AAS), Associate of Science (AS), and Associate of Arts (AA) degrees as well as several Information Technology Certifications.
