= Montana University System =

Public university system in Montana

The Montana University System (MUS) was created on July 1, 1994, when the Montana Board of Regents of Higher Education restructured the state's public colleges and universities, with the goal of streamlining the state's higher education in the wake of decreased state funding. It has sixteen campuses divided among the two state university systems, and community colleges.

== Universities ==
Location of MUS campuses. Black dots represent University of Montana campuses. Blue dots represent Montana State University campuses. Red dots represent community colleges. Flagship campuses (UMT, MSU) are labeled in larger font.

Each university subsystem has campuses around the state, with a university President at the main campus, Chancellors at each of the three smaller units, and Deans/CEOs at the two-year comprehensive colleges. The main campus gives administrative and library assistance to the smaller units, but each unit sets its own curriculum with the Board of Regents' approval.

The University of Montana System

- University of Montana (flagship campus, in Missoula)
- University of Montana Bitterroot College (in Hamilton)
- Helena College (in Helena)
- University of Montana Western (in Dillon)
- Montana Technological University (in Butte)

Montana State University System

- Montana State University (flagship campus, in Bozeman)
- Montana State University Billings (in Billings)
- Montana State University–Northern (in Havre)
- Great Falls College Montana State University (in Great Falls)

== Community colleges ==
- Dawson Community College (in Glendive)
- Flathead Valley Community College (in Kalispell)
- Miles Community College (in Miles City)

== Athletics ==
Some institutions sponsors athletic programs. University of Montana and Montana State University are members of Big Sky Conference of the NCAA Division I. Montana State University Billings is member of the GNAC of NCAA Division II. While University of Montana Western, Montana Technological University and Montana State University–Northern are members of Frontier Conference of the NAIA.

Dawson Community College and Miles Community College are members of the Mon-Dak Conference, part of the NJCAA.
