= Montana State University–Northern =

Public university in Havre, Montana

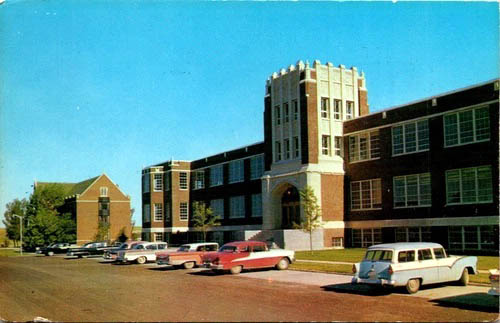
- Former names: Northern Montana School (1929–1931); Northern Montana College (1931–1994)
- Type: Public college
- Established: 1929; 97 years ago
- Parent institution: Montana University System
- Academic affiliations: Space-grant
- Endowment: US$3.254 million (FY2005)
- Chancellor: Greg Kegel
- Vice-Chancellor: Jennifer Brown
- Students: 1,107
- Undergraduates: 1,063
- Postgraduates: 44
- Location: Havre, Montana, U.S. 48.5421°N 109.6887°W
- Campus: Rural
- Colors: Maroon & Gold
- Nicknames: Men's: Northern Lights; Women's: Northern Skylights
- Sporting affiliations: NAIA – Frontier
- Mascots: Polar Bears (Aurora & Boris)
- Website: msun.edu
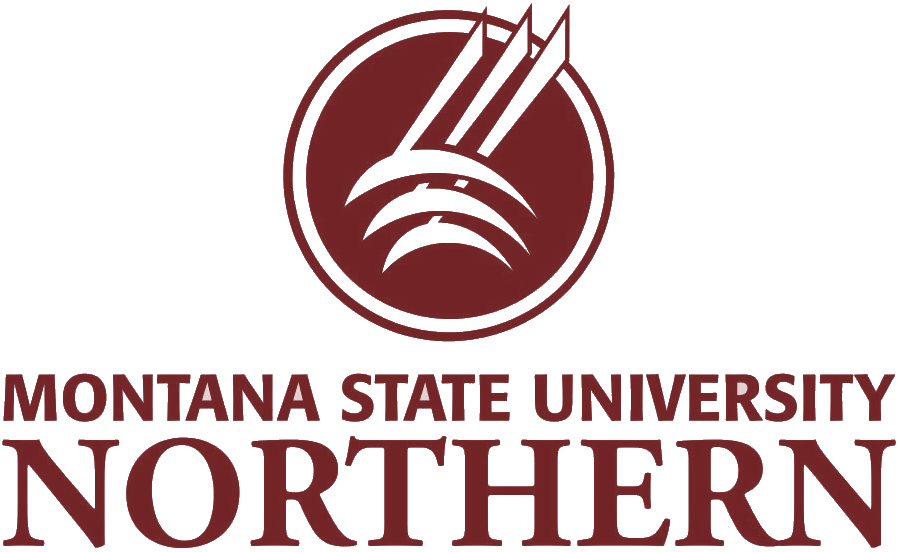

Montana State University–Northern (MSU–Northern or Northern) is a public college in Havre, Montana, United States. It is part of the Montana University System and was "Northern Montana College" prior to the restructuring of Montana's public university system in 1994.

== History ==
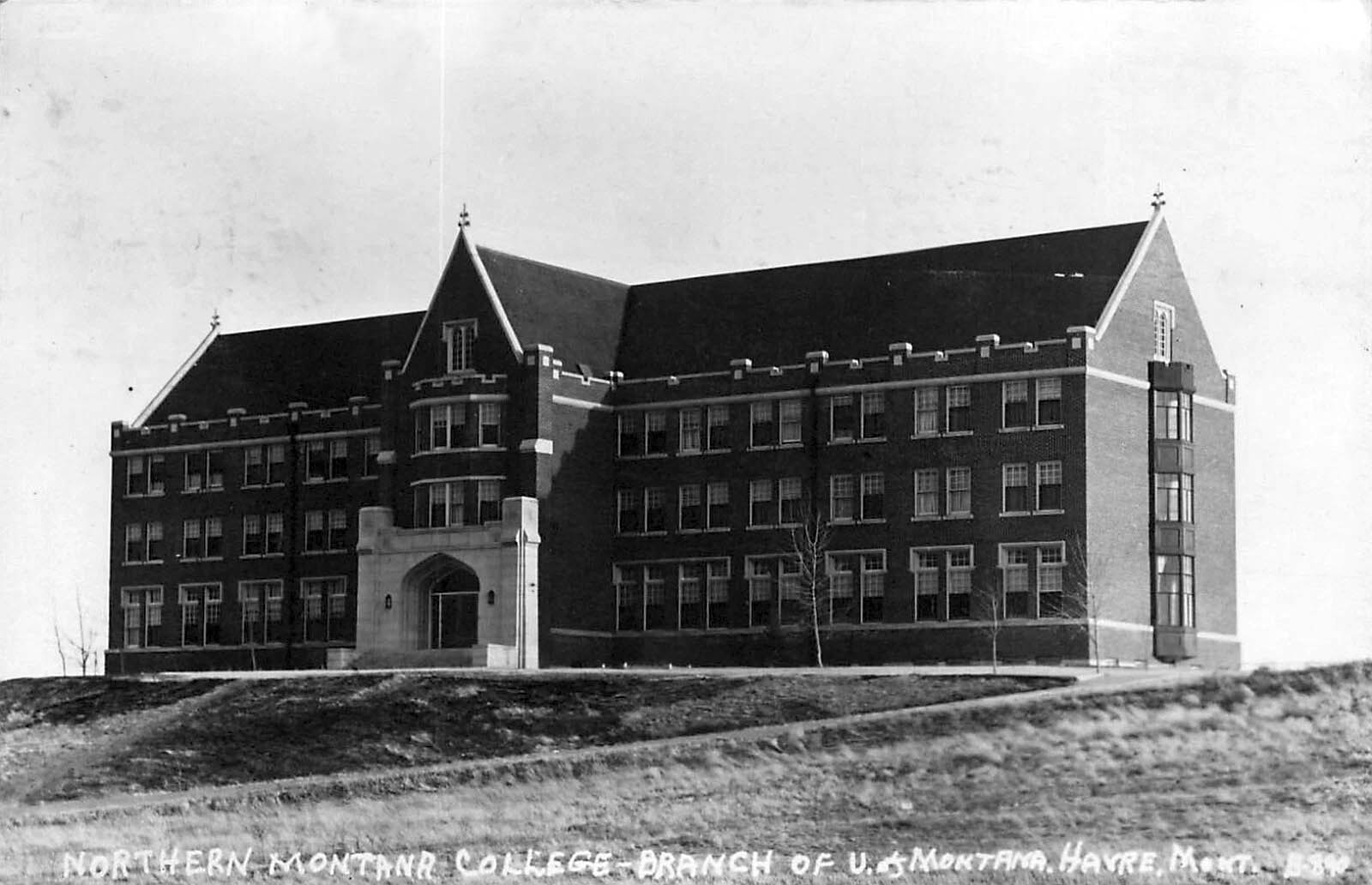
The college in 1946

In 1913, the Montana State Legislature approved the establishment of the "Northern Montana Agricultural and Manual Training School" at Fort Assinniboine, 6 miles (9.7 km) southwest of Havre, but no money was actually appropriated. The state legislature amended their original act in 1927 to include certain academic subjects and in 1929, the legislature appropriated funds to establish the college as a branch of the University of Montana (later renamed the Montana University System). Northern Montana College opened its doors in September 1929 in temporary quarters in Havre High School, and moved to its present campus in 1932.

== Student life ==
Undergraduate demographics as of Fall 2023
| Race and ethnicity | Total |
|---|---|
| White | 69% |
| American Indian/Alaska Native | 20% |
| Hispanic | 5% |
| Two or more races | 3% |
| Black | 2% |
| Unknown | 1% |
Economic diversity
| Low-income (Note: The percentage of students who received an income-based federal Pell grant intended for low-income students.) | 36% |
| Affluent (Note: The percentage of students who are a part of the American middle class at the bare minimum.) | 64% |

== Athletics ==
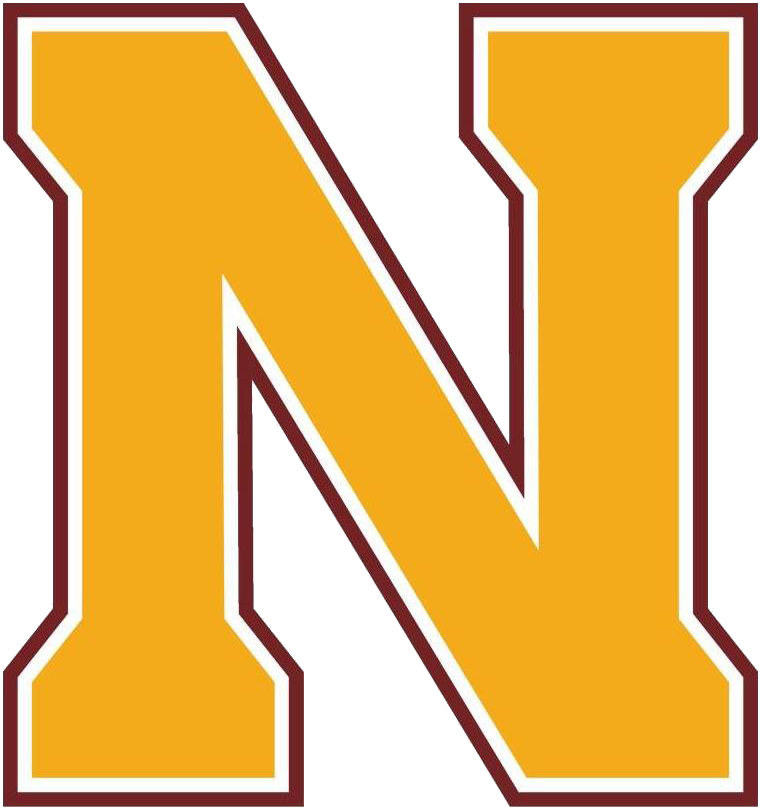
MSU Northern athletics monogram

The Montana State–Northern athletic teams are called the Lights and Skylights. The university is a member of the National Association of Intercollegiate Athletics (NAIA), primarily competing in the Frontier Conference for most of its sports since the 1935–36 academic year.

University's rodeo teams compete in the National Intercollegiate Rodeo Association (NIRA).

Montana State–Northern competes in 11 intercollegiate varsity sports: Men's sports include basketball, cross country, football, golf, rodeo and wrestling; while women's sports include basketball, cross country, golf, rodeo and volleyball.

== Notable alumni ==
- Hunter Azure, mixed martial artist
- Jacob Bachmeier, politician
- Michael Claxton, professional basketball player and coach
- Dylan Cook, professional football player
- Garrison Courtney, civil servant
- Ryan Divish, journalist
- Kathleen Galvin-Halcro (B.A. 1993), former member of the Montana House of Representatives (1998–2006)
- Jesse Juarez, mixed martial artist
- Kingsley Ogwudire, professional basketball player
- Michael Rao, university administrator
- Flint Rasmussen, sports announcer
- Lawrence Romo, civil servant
- Jerome Souers, college football coach
- Bruce Thompson, civil servant
- James Welch, author
- Sherry Winn, college basketball coach

== See also ==
- List of college athletic programs in Montana
