= List of Hawaii Rainbow Warriors in the NFL draft =

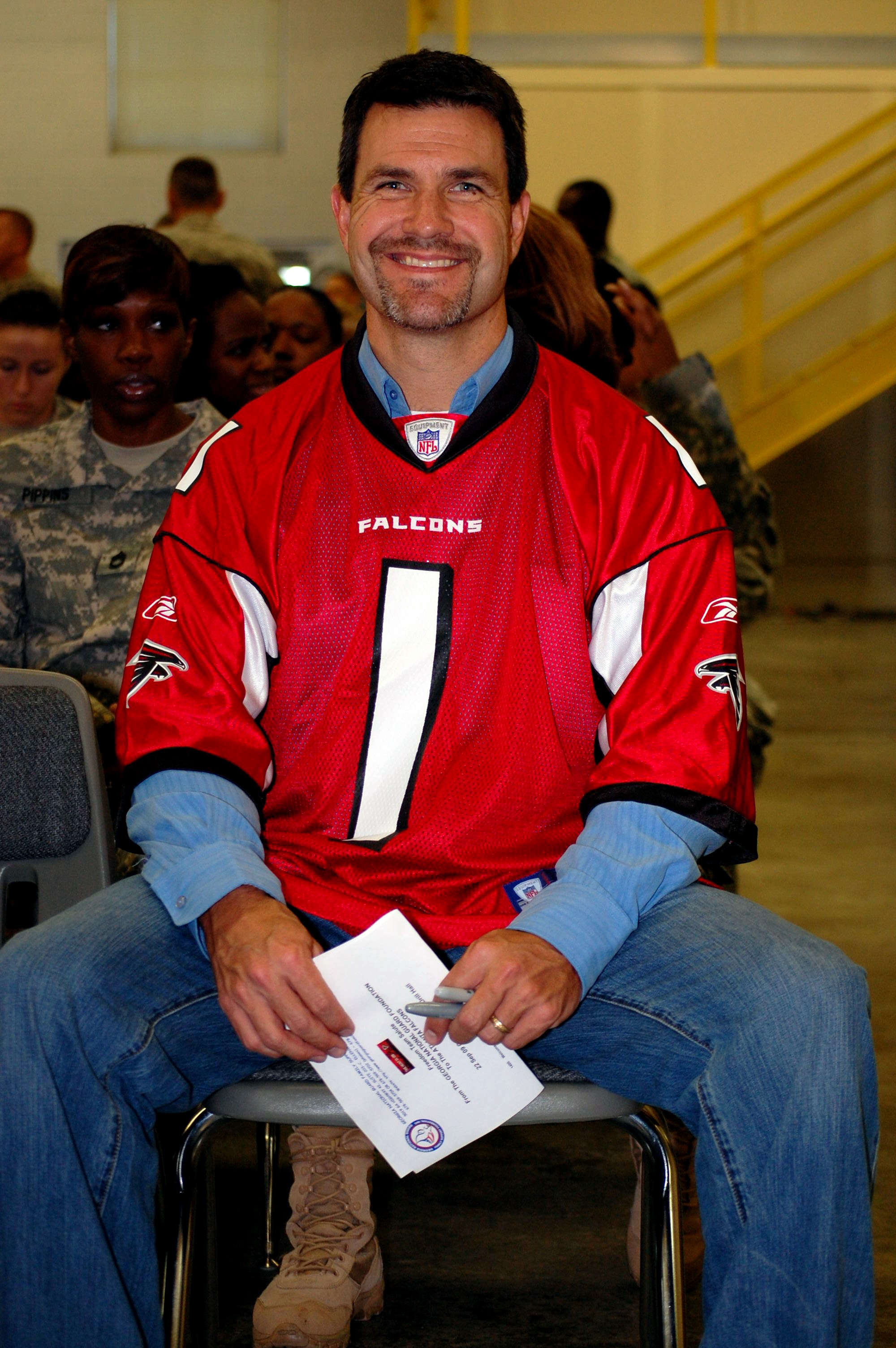
Jason Elam was drafted 70th overall by the Denver Broncos in the 1993 NFL Draft.

The Hawaii Rainbow Warriors football team, representing the University of Hawaiʻi at Mānoa, has had 69 American football players drafted into the National Football League (NFL) since the first draft in 1936. (Note: Because of the NFL–AFL merger agreement, the history of the AFL is officially recognized by the NFL and therefore this list includes the AFL draft (1960–1966) and the Common Draft (1967–1969).) The highest that a Warrior has ever been drafted is 19th overall, which occurred when Ashley Lelie was drafted in 2002. The St. Louis Rams have drafted the most Warriors with six.

Each NFL franchise seeks to add new players through the annual NFL Draft. The draft rules were last updated in 2009. The team with the worst record the previous year picks first, the next-worst team second, and so on. Teams that did not make the playoffs are ordered by their regular-season record, with any remaining ties broken by strength of schedule. Playoff participants are sequenced after non-playoff teams, based on their round of elimination (wild card, division, conference, and Super Bowl).

Before the merger agreement in 1966, the American Football League (AFL) operated in direct competition with the NFL and held a separate draft. This led to a massive bidding war over top prospects between the two leagues, along with the subsequent drafting of the same player in each draft. As part of the merger agreement on June 8, 1966, the two leagues held a multiple round "Common Draft". Once the AFL officially merged with the NFL in 1970, the "Common Draft" simply became the NFL Draft.

The most Warriors selected in a single NFL Draft is five, in 2007. Of the Warriors selected in the NFL Draft, two have been selected to a Pro Bowl: Jason Elam and Jesse Sapolu. Nine have been a member of a Super Bowl winning team, including Sapolu and Elam. One Warrior, Jim Mills, is a member of the Canadian Football Hall of Fame.

== Key ==
B	Back	K	Kicker	NT	Nose tackle
C	Center	LB	Linebacker	FB	Fullback
DB	Defensive back	P	Punter	HB	Halfback
DE	Defensive end	QB	Quarterback	WR	Wide receiver
DT	Defensive tackle	RB	Running back	G	Guard
E	End	T	Offensive tackle	TE	Tight end

*	Selected to a Pro Bowl
†	Won a Super Bowl championship
‡	Selected to a Pro Bowl and won a Super Bowl

== Players selected ==
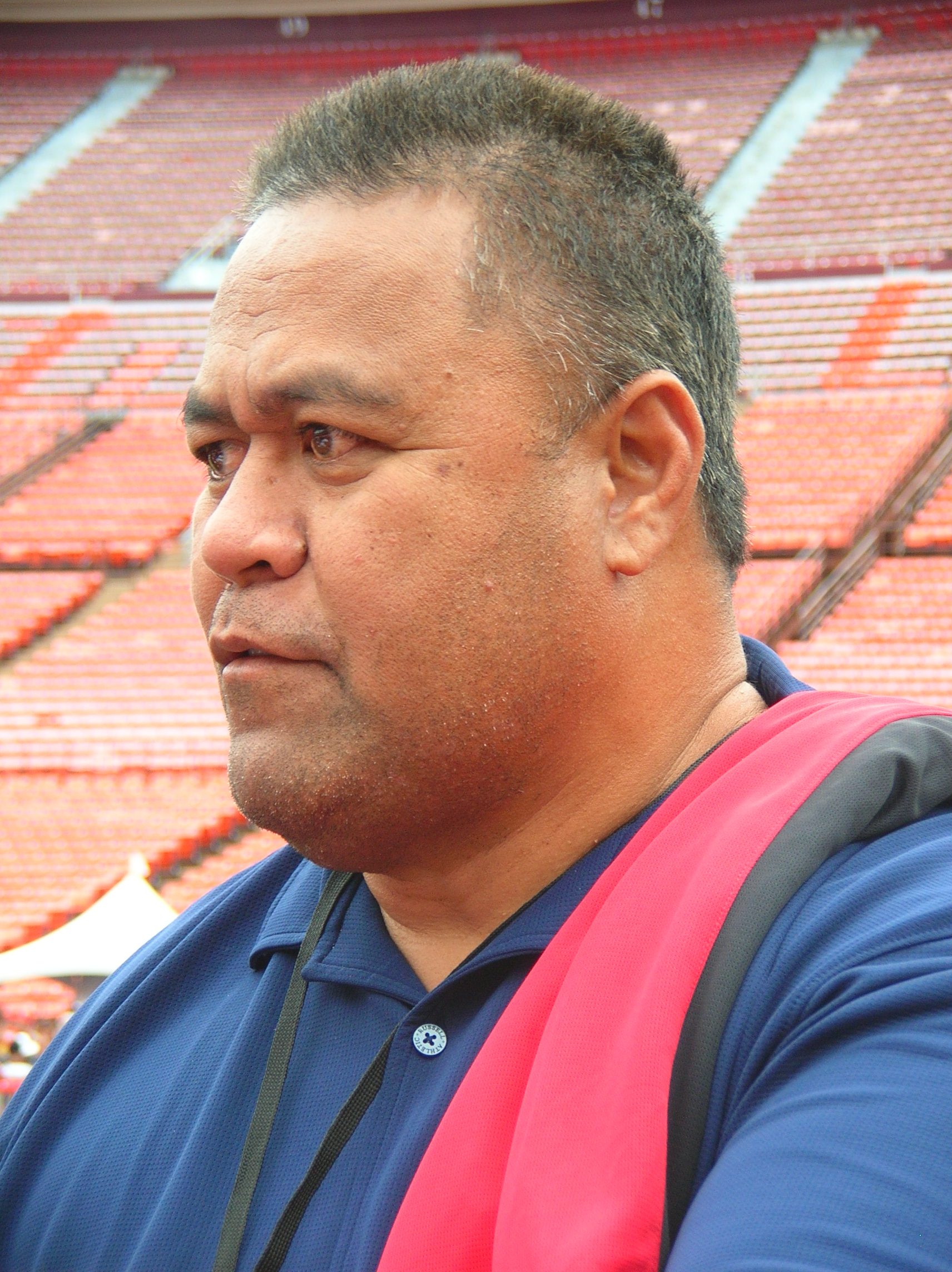
Jesse Sapolu was drafted 289th overall by the San Francisco 49ers in the 1983 NFL Draft.

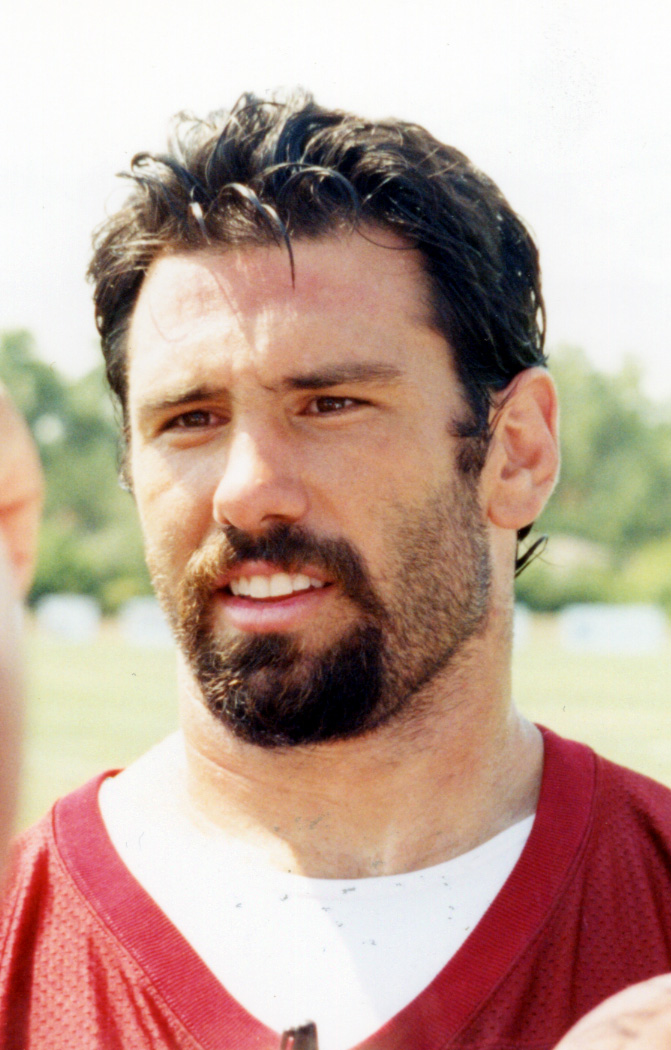
Jeff Ulbrich was drafted 86th overall by the San Francisco 49ers in the 2000 NFL Draft.

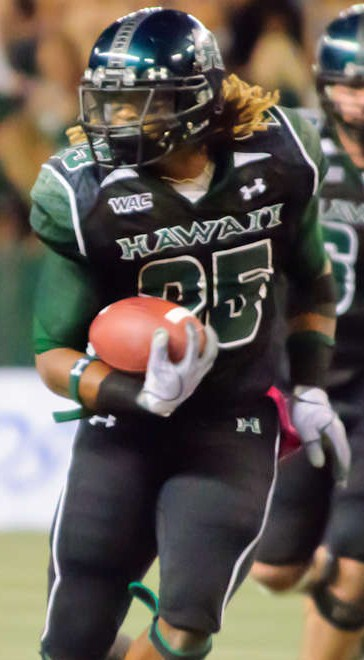
Alex Green was drafted 96th overall by the Green Bay Packers in the 2011 NFL Draft.

Hawaii Warriors selected in the NFL/AFL Drafts
Year	Round	Pick	Overall	Player	Team	Position	Notes
1968	16	20	428	Larry Cole^{†}	Dallas Cowboys	DE	Super Bowl champion (VI, XII)
1969	8	5	186	Tim Buchanan	Cincinnati Bengals	LB	—
1969	10	7	241	McKinley Reynolds	New Orleans Saints	RB	—
1970	12	22	308	Larry Arnold	Los Angeles Rams	QB	—
1971	10	5	239	Rocky Pamplin	New Orleans Saints	RB	—
1971	16	13	403	Ed Foote	San Diego Chargers	C	—
1972	10	23	257	Rich Ruppert	Kansas City Chiefs	T	—
1972	13	15	327	Henry Sovio	Atlanta Falcons	TE	—
1973	2	20	46	Golden Richards^{†} (Note: Golden Richards is listed in sources as being from BYU when drafted, but transferred to Hawaii his senior year of college.)	Dallas Cowboys	WR	Super Bowl champion (XII)
1973	16	20	410	John Conley	Dallas Cowboys	TE	—
1974	2	26	52	Jeris White^{†}	Miami Dolphins	DB	Super Bowl champion (XVII)
1974	17	9	425	Levi Stanley	San Francisco 49ers	G	—
1976	3	16	76	John Woodcock	Detroit Lions	DT	—
1976	9	17	254	Curtis Akins	Washington Redskins	G	—
1977	4	22	106	Dan Audick^{†}	Pittsburgh Steelers	T	Super Bowl champion (XVI)
1979	8	18	210	Wilbert Haslip	San Diego Chargers	RB	—
1980	9	1	222	DeWayne Jett	Detroit Lions	WR	—
1980	9	2	223	Tom Tuinei	Detroit Lions	DT	—
1982	6	9	148	Gary Allen	Houston Oilers	RB	—
1982	7	9	176	David Toloumu	Atlanta Falcons	RB	—
1982	8	4	199	Mark Kafentzis	Cleveland Browns	DB	—
1982	10	18	269	Dana McLemore^{†}	San Francisco 49ers	DB	Super Bowl champion (XIX)
1983	7	6	174	Anthony Edgar	Philadelphia Eagles	RB	—
1983	9	1	225	Jim Mills	Baltimore Colts	T	—
1983	11	10	289	Jesse Sapolu^{‡}	San Francisco 49ers	C	Pro Bowl (1993, 1994); Super Bowl champion (XIX, XXIII, XXIV, XXIX)
1984	7	26	194	Bernard Carvalho	Miami Dolphins	G	—
1984	8	5	201	Niko Noga	St. Louis Cardinals	LB	—
1985	5	10	122	Raphel Cherry	Washington Redskins	DB	—
1985	6	26	166	Rich Miano	New York Jets	DB	—
1985	7	2	170	Mike Akiu	Houston Oilers	WR	—
1986	2	18	45	Walter Murray	Washington Redskins	WR	—
1986	9	6	227	Kent Kafentzis	St. Louis Cardinals	DB	—
1986	9	24	245	Nuu Faaola	New York Jets	RB	—
1987	3	14	70	Colin Scotts	St. Louis Cardinals	DT	—
1987	4	3	87	Ron Hall	Tampa Bay Buccaneers	TE	—
1987	6	11	151	Joe Onosai	Dallas Cowboys	G	—
1987	9	20	243	M. L. Johnson	Seattle Seahawks	LB	—
1988	3	16	71	Al Noga	Minnesota Vikings	DE	—
1988	10	22	271	Marco Johnson	Houston Oilers	WR	—
1990	3	7	60	Leo Goeas	San Diego Chargers	G	—
1992	6	20	160	Jeff Sydner	Philadelphia Eagles	WR	—
1993	3	14	70	Jason Elam^{‡}	Denver Broncos	K	Pro Bowl (1995, 1998, 2002); Super Bowl champion (XXXII, XXXIII)
1993	8	13	209	Maa Tanuvasa^{†}	Los Angeles Rams	DT	Super Bowl champion (XXXII, XXXIII)
1993	8	24	220	Darrick Branch	Tampa Bay Buccaneers	WR	—
1994	4	19	122	Ta'ase Faumui	Pittsburgh Steelers	DE	—
2000	2	15	46	Adrian Klemm^{†}	New England Patriots	T	Super Bowl champion (XXXVI, XXXVIII, XXXIX)
2000	3	24	86	Jeff Ulbrich	San Francisco 49ers	LB	—
2000	4	10	104	Kaulana Noa	St. Louis Rams	G	—
2001	7	19	219	Kynan Forney	Atlanta Falcons	G	—
2002	1	19	19	Ashley Lelie	Denver Broncos	WR	—
2003	2	11	43	Pisa Tinoisamoa	St. Louis Rams	LB	—
2003	3	8	72	Vince Manuwai	Jacksonville Jaguars	G	—
2003	3	9	73	Wayne Hunter	Seattle Seahawks	T	—
2004	2	10	42	Travis LaBoy	Tennessee Titans	DE	—
2004	4	8	104	Isaac Sopoaga	San Francisco 49ers	DT	—
2005	6	11	185	Chad Owens	Jacksonville Jaguars	WR	—
2007	2	26	58	Ikaika Alama-Francis	Detroit Lions	DE	—
2007	2	28	60	Samson Satele	Miami Dolphins	C	—
2007	6	7	181	Reagan Maui'a	Miami Dolphins	FB	—
2007	6	26	200	Melila Purcell	Cleveland Browns	DE	—
2007	7	26	236	Nate Ilaoa	Philadelphia Eagles	RB	—
2008	6	20	186	Colt Brennan	Washington Redskins	QB	—
2009	2	20	52	David Veikune	Cleveland Browns	DE	—
2009	3	30	94	Ryan Mouton	Tennessee Titans	DB	—
2009	6	25	198	Jake Ingram	New England Patriots	LS	—
2011	3	32	96	Alex Green	Green Bay Packers	RB	—
2011	4	15	112	Greg Salas	St. Louis Rams	WR	—
2011	5	1	132	Kealoha Pilares	Carolina Panthers	WR	—
2012	7	2	209	Aaron Brown	St. Louis Rams	LB	—
2015	7	14	231	Joey Iosefa	Tampa Bay Buccaneers	FB	—
2019	2	11	43	Jahlani Tavai	Detroit Lions	LB	—
2019	7	22	236	John Ursua	Seattle Seahawks	WR	—
2020	7	10	224	Cole McDonald	Tennessee Titans	QB	—
