= Hawaii Rainbow Warriors football statistical leaders =

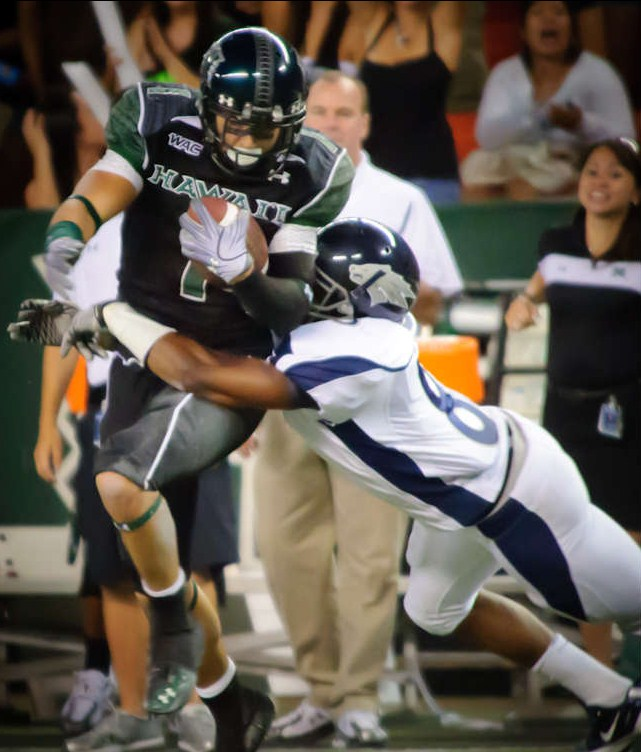
Greg Salas holds the Rainbow Warriors' career receiving yards record.

The Hawaii Rainbow Warriors football statistical leaders are individual statistical leaders of the Hawaii Rainbow Warriors football program in various categories, including passing, rushing, receiving, total offense, defensive stats, and kicking. Within those areas, the lists identify single-game, Single season and career leaders. The Rainbow Warriors represent the University of Hawai'i at Mānoa in the NCAA Division I FBS Mountain West Conference (MW).

Although Hawaii began competing in intercollegiate football in 1909, the school's official record book considers the "modern era" to have begun in 1968. Records from before this year are often incomplete and inconsistent, and they are generally not included in these lists.

These lists are dominated by more recent players for several reasons:

- Since 1968, college football seasons have increased from 10 games to 11 and then 12 games in length. Additionally, the NCAA allows Hawaii to play one more game each season than institutions located on the U.S. mainland, presumably as compensation for the costs required to travel to games on the mainland. In turn, this means that a typical Hawaii season now consists of 13 regular-season games, not counting possible conference championship games or bowl appearances.
- The NCAA didn't allow freshmen to play varsity football until 1972 (with the exception of the World War II years), allowing players to have four-year careers.
- Bowl games only began counting toward single-season and career statistics in 2002. The Rainbow Warriors have played in 12 bowl games since then.
- The Rainbow Warriors also played in the 2019 MW Championship Game, giving players in that season yet another game to accumulate statistics.
- Since 2018, players have been allowed to participate in as many as four games in a redshirt season; previously, playing in even one game "burned" the redshirt. Since 2024, postseason games have not counted against the four-game limit. These changes to redshirt rules have given very recent players several extra games to accumulate statistics.
- Due to COVID-19 disruptions, the NCAA did not count the 2020 season against the eligibility of any football player, giving all players active in that season five years of eligibility instead of the normal four.

These lists are updated through the end of the 2025 season. The 2025 Hawai'i Football Almanac does not list a top 10 for every statistic, sometimes only listing a single leader.

== Passing ==
=== Passing yards ===
Career
Rank	Player	Yards	Years
1	Timmy Chang	17,072	2000 2001 2002 2003 2004
2	Colt Brennan	14,193	2005 2006 2007
3	Bryant Moniz	10,169	2009 2010 2011
4	Brayden Schager	9,096	2021 2022 2023 2024
5	Cole McDonald	8,032	2017 2018 2019
6	Chevan Cordeiro	6,167	2018 2019 2020 2021
7	Dan Robinson	6,038	1997 1998 1999
8	Garrett Gabriel	5,631	1987 1988 1989 1990
9	Dru Brown	5,273	2016 2017
10	Raphel Cherry	5,046	1981 1982 1983 1984

Single season
Rank	Player	Yards	Year
1	Colt Brennan	5,549	2006
2	Bryant Moniz	5,040	2010
3	Timmy Chang	4,474	2002
4	Colt Brennan	4,343	2007
5	Colt Brennan	4,301	2005
6	Timmy Chang	4,258	2004
7	Timmy Chang	4,199	2003
8	Cole McDonald	4,135	2019
9	Cole McDonald	3,875	2018
10	Dan Robinson	3,853	1999

Single game
Rank	Player	Yards	Year	Opponent
1	Bryant Moniz	560	2010	San Jose State
2	Colt Brennan	559	2006	Arizona State
3	Colt Brennan	548	2007	Louisiana Tech
4	Colt Brennan	545	2007	San Jose State
5	Nick Rolovich	543	2001	BYU
6	Timmy Chang	534	2003	Louisiana Tech
7	Bryant Moniz	532	2010	Louisiana Tech
8	Dan Robinson	530	1999	Navy
9	Colt Brennan	515	2005	New Mexico State
10	Nick Rolovich	505	2001	Air Force

=== Passing touchdowns ===
Career
Rank	Player	TDs	Years
1	Colt Brennan	131	2005 2006 2007
2	Timmy Chang	117	2000 2001 2002 2003 2004
3	Bryant Moniz	75	2009 2010 2011
4	Cole McDonald	70	2017 2018 2019
5	Brayden Schager	60	2021 2022 2023 2024
6	Garrett Gabriel	47	1987 1988 1989 1990
7	Chevan Cordeiro	45	2018 2019 2020 2021
8	Nick Rolovich	40	2000 2001
9	Dan Robinson	39	1997 1998 1999
	Sean Schroeder	39	2012 2013

Single season
Rank	Player	TDs	Year
1	Colt Brennan	58	2006
2	Bryant Moniz	39	2010
3	Timmy Chang	38	2004
	Colt Brennan	38	2007
5	Cole McDonald	36	2018
6	Colt Brennan	35	2005
7	Nick Rolovich	34	2001
8	Cole McDonald	33	2019
9	Timmy Chang	29	2003
10	Sean Schroeder	28	2013

Single game
Rank	Player	TDs	Year	Opponent
1	Nick Rolovich	8	2001	BYU

== Rushing ==
=== Rushing yards ===
Career
Rank	Player	Yards	Years
1	Gary Allen	3,451	1978 1979 1980 1981
2	Diocemy Saint Juste	3,102	2013 2014 2016 2017
3	Michael Carter	2,528	1990 1991 1992 1993
4	Travis Sims	2,311	1989 1990 1991 1992
5	Joey Iosefa	2,218	2011 2012 2013 2014
6	Larry Sherrer	2,174	1969 1970 1971
7	Jamal Farmer	2,124	1988 1989 1990 1991
8	Heikoti Fakava	2,111	1985 1986 1987 1988
9	Wilbert Haslip	2,073	1975 1976 1977 1978
10	Albert Holmes	1,941	1971 1972 1973

Single season
Rank	Player	Yards	Year
1	Diocemy Saint Juste	1,510	2017
2	Travis Sims	1,498	1992
3	Alex Green	1,199	2010
4	Albert Holmes	1,146	1972
5	Paul Harris	1,132	2015
6	Larry Sherrer	1,129	1971
7	Michael Carter	1,092	1991
8	Nuu Faaola	1,064	1985
9	Gary Allen	1,040	1979
10	Gary Allen	1,006	1981
	Diocemy Saint Juste	1,006	2016

Single game
Rank	Player	Yards	Year	Opponent
1	Alex Green	327	2010	New Mexico State
2	Pete Wilson	270	1950	BYU
3	Anthony Edgar	242	1982	Air Force
	Jamal Farmer	242	1989	Air Force
5	Diocemy Saint Juste	241	2017	Nevada
6	Wilbert Haslip	221	1977	Idaho
7	Joey Iosefa	219	2014	UNLV
8	Michael Carter	214	1991	Wyoming
9	Diocemy Saint Juste	205	2016	Nevada
10	Gary Allen	202	1979	UTEP
	Travis Sims	202	1992	UTEP
	Diocemy Saint Juste	202	2017	Western Carolina
	Diocemy Saint Juste	202	2017	San Jose State

=== Rushing touchdowns ===
Career
Rank	Player	TDs	Years
1	Michael Carter	39	1990 1991 1992 1993
3	Heikoti Fakava	31	1985 1986 1987 1988
	Jamal Farmer	31	1988 1989 1990 1991
4	Larry Sherrer	26	1969 1970 1971
5	Joey Iosefa	21	2011 2012 2013 2014
6	Nate Ilaoa	20	2002 2003 2005 2006
	Alex Green	20	2009 2010
8	Gary Allen	19	1978 1979 1980 1981
9	Steven Lakalaka	19	2013 2014 2015 2016
	Dedrick Parson	19	2021 2022

Single season
Rank	Player	TDs	Year
1	Thero Mitchell	21	2002
2	Jamal Farmer	18	1989
	Alex Green	18	2010
4	Larry Sherrer	16	1971
	Heikoti Fakava	16	1987
	Michael Carter	16	1991
7	Nate Ilaoa	13	2006
8	Steven Lakalaka	13	2016
9	Albert Holmes	12	1972
	Heikoti Fakava	12	1988

Single game
Rank	Player	TDs	Year	Opponent
1	Heikoti Fakava	5	1987	Yale

== Receiving ==
=== Receptions ===
Career
Rank	Player	Rec	Years
1	Davone Bess	293	2005 2006 2007
2	Jason Rivers	292	2003 2004 2006 2007
3	Greg Salas	285	2007 2008 2009 2010
4	Chad Owens	239	2001 2002 2003 2004
5	Ryan Grice-Mullen	237	2005 2006 2006
6	Pofele Ashlock	220	2023 2024 2025
7	Justin Colbert	212	1999 2000 2001 2002
8	Kealoha Pilares	209	2007 2008 2009 2010
9	Ashley Lelie	194	1999 2000 2001
10	John Ursua	189	2015 2016 2017 2018

Single season
Rank	Player	Rec	Year
1	Greg Salas	119	2010
2	Davone Bess	108	2007
3	Ryan Grice-Mullen	106	2007
	Greg Salas	106	2009
5	Chad Owens	102	2004
6	Cedric Byrd II	98	2019
7	Davone Bess	96	2006
8	Justin Colbert	92	2002
	Jason Rivers	92	2007
10	Davone Bess	89	2005
	John Ursua	89	2018

Single game
Rank	Player	Rec	Year	Opponent
1	Kealoha Pilares	18	2010	Louisiana Tech
2	Greg Salas	16	2009	New Mexico State
3	Davone Bess	15	2007	Boise State
4	Chad Owens	14	2003	Army
	Davone Bess	14	2005	Fresno State
	Jason Rivers	14	2006	Arizona State
	Ryan Grice-Mullen	14	2007	San Jose State
	Jason Rivers	14	2007	Louisiana Tech
	Jason Rivers	14	2007	Washington
	Cedric Byrd II	14	2019	Arizona
	Pofele Ashlock	14	2025	California

=== Receiving yards ===
Career
Rank	Player	Yards	Years
1	Greg Salas	4,345	2007 2008 2009 2010
2	Jason Rivers	3,919	2003 2004 2006 2007
3	Davone Bess	3,610	2005 2006 2007
4	Ryan Grice-Mullen	3,370	2005 2006 2006
5	Ashley Lelie	3,341	1999 2000 2001
6	Chad Owens	3,031	2001 2002 2003 2004
7	Justin Colbert	2,905	1999 2000 2001 2002
8	Walter Murray	2,865	1982 1983 1984 1985
9	John Ursua	2,662	2015 2016 2017 2018
10	Marcus Kemp	2,570	2013 2014 2015 2016

Single season
Rank	Player	Yards	Year
1	Greg Salas	1,889	2010
2	Ashley Lelie	1,713	2001
3	Greg Salas	1,590	2009
4	Ryan Grice-Mullen	1,372	2007
5	John Ursua	1,343	2018
6	Kealoha Pilares	1,306	2010
7	Justin Colbert	1,302	2002
8	Chad Owens	1,290	2004
9	Davone Bess	1,266	2007
10	Dwight Carter	1,253	1999

Single game
Rank	Player	Yards	Year	Opponent
1	Jason Rivers	308	2006	Arizona State
2	Ashley Lelie	285	2001	Air Force
3	Chad Owens	283	2004	Michigan State
4	John Ursua	241	2017	UMass
5	Ashley Lelie	262	2001	BYU
6	Britton Komine	238	2002	Nevada
7	Cedric Byrd II	224	2019	Arizona
8	Dwight Carter	220	1999	Eastern Illinois
9	Kealoha Pilares	217	2010	Louisiana Tech
10	Royce Pollard	216	2011	Louisiana Tech

=== Receiving touchdowns ===
Career
Rank	Player	TDs	Years
1	Davone Bess	41	2005 2006 2006
2	Ryan Grice-Mullen	36	2005 2006 2006
3	Jason Rivers	35	2003 2004 2006 2007
4	Ashley Lelie	32	1999 2000 2001
5	Chad Owens	29	2001 2002 2003 2004
6	Greg Salas	26	2007 2008 2009 2010
7	John Ursua	24	2015 2016 2017 2018
8	Pofele Ashlock	23	2023 2024 2025
9	Chris Roscoe	22	1987 1988 1989
	Kealoha Pilares	22	2007 2008 2009 2010

Single season
Rank	Player	TDs	Year
1	Ashley Lelie	19	2001
2	Chad Owens	17	2004
3	John Ursua	16	2018
4	Ryan Grice-Mullen	15	2007
	Kealoha Pilares	15	2010
6	Davone Bess	14	2005
	Davone Bess	14	2006
	Greg Salas	14	2010
9	Davone Bess	13	2007
10	Ryan Grice-Mullen	12	2005
	Jackson Harris	12	2025

Single game
Rank	Player	TDs	Year	Opponent
1	Chad Owens	4	2004	Northwestern
	Chad Owens	4	2004	Michigan State
	Ryan Grice-Mullen	4	2005	New Mexico State
	Jason Rivers	4	2007	Washington
	Chris Grant	4	2013	Wyoming
	Cedric Byrd II	4	2019	Arizona
	Cedric Byrd II	4	2019	Oregon State

== Total offense ==
Total offense is the sum of passing and rushing statistics. It does not include receiving or returns.

=== Total offense yards ===
Career
Rank	Player	Yards	Years
1	Timmy Chang	16,910	2000 2001 2002 2003 2004
2	Colt Brennan	14,740	2005 2006 2007
3	Bryant Moniz	10,681	2009 2010 2011
4	Brayden Schager	9,406	2021 2022 2023 2024
5	Cole McDonald	8,912	2017 2018 2019
6	Chevan Cordeiro	7,250	2018 2019 2020 2021
7	Garrett Gabriel	6,181	1987 1988 1989 1990
8	Michael Carter	6,032	1990 1991 1992 1993
9	Raphel Cherry	5,944	1981 1982 1983 1984
10	Dru Brown	5,586	2016 2017

Single season
Rank	Player	Yards	Year
1	Colt Brennan	5,915	2006
2	Bryant Moniz	5,142	2010
3	Cole McDonald	4,518	2019
4	Timmy Chang	4,457	2002
5	Colt Brennan	4,455	2005
6	Colt Brennan	4,368	2007
7	Timmy Chang	4,273	2004
8	Cole McDonald	4,234	2018
9	Timmy Chang	4,139	2003
10	Dan Robinson	3,762	1999

Single game
Rank	Player	Yards	Year	Opponent
1	Bryant Moniz	581	2010	Louisiana Tech
2	Colt Brennan	574	2006	Arizona State
3	Colt Brennan	561	2005	New Mexico State
4	Nick Rolovich	558	2001	BYU
5	Bryant Moniz	546	2010	San Jose State
6	Colt Brennan	544	2007	San Jose State
7	Colt Brennan	540	2007	Louisiana Tech
8	Timmy Chang	527	2003	Louisiana Tech
9	Dan Robinson	525	1999	Navy
10	Micah Alejado	523	2024	New Mexico

=== Touchdowns responsible for ===
"Touchdowns responsible for" is the official NCAA term for combined rushing and passing touchdowns. It does not include receiving or returns.

Career
Rank	Player	TDs	Years
1	Colt Brennan	146	2005 2006 2007
2	Timmy Chang	123	2000 2001 2002 2003 2004
3	Bryant Moniz	88	2009 2010 2011
4	Cole McDonald	82	2017 2018 2019
5	Brayden Schager	68	2021 2022 2023 2024
6	Michael Carter	65	1990 1991 1992 1993
7	Chevan Cordeiro	58	2018 2019 2020 2021
8	Garrett Gabriel	57	1987 1988 1989 1990
9	Dan Robinson	45	1997 1998 1999
10	Raphel Cherry	43	1981 1982 1983 1984
	Dru Brown	43	2016 2017

Single season
Rank	Player	TDs	Year
1	Colt Brennan	63	2006
2	Colt Brennan	46	2007
3	Bryant Moniz	43	2010
4	Timmy Chang	40	2004
	Cole McDonald	40	2018
	Cole McDonald	40	2019
7	Colt Brennan	37	2005
8	Nick Rolovich	34	2001
9	Timmy Chang	30	2003
	Bryant Moniz	30	2011
	Sean Schroeder	30	2013

Single game
Rank	Player	TDs	Year	Opponent
1	Nick Rolovich	8	2001	BYU

== Defense ==
=== Interceptions ===
Career
Rank	Player	Ints	Years
1	Mana Silva	14	2000 2009 2010
2	Keoni Jardine	13	1977 1978 1979 1980
	Kelvin Millhouse, Jr.	13	2001 2002 2003
4	Abraham Elimimian	12	2001 2002 2003 2004
5	Harold Stringert	11	1972 1973
	Kurt Kafentzis	11	1981 1982 1983 1984
	Walter Briggs	11	1986 1987 1988 1989
8	Kent Kafentzis	10	1981 1982 1984 1985
9	Jeris White	9	1970 1971 1972 1973
	Ken Shibata	9	1973 1974
	Lyndell Jones	9	1979 1980
	Quincy LeJay	9	1998 1999

Single season
Rank	Player	Ints	Year
1	Walter Briggs	9	1989
2	Mana Silva	8	2010
3	Ken Shibata	7	1974
	Quincy LeJay	7	1999
	Nate Jackson	7	2000
6	Steve Adler	6	1970
	George Lumpkin	6	1970
	Jeris White	6	1971
	Harold Stringert	6	1973
	Tony Pang-Kee	6	1990
	Mana Silva	6	2009

Single game
Rank	Player	Ints	Year	Opponent
1	Joe Kaulukukui	3	1938	San Jose State
	Gene Tokuhama	3	1966	Fresno State
	Hal Stringert	3	1973	Washington
	Tony Pang-Kee	3	1990	Cal State Fullerton
	Kenny Harper	3	1990	BYU
	Abraham Elimimian	3	2004	UTEP

=== Tackles ===
Career
Rank	Player	Tackles	Years
1	Solomon Elimimian	434	2005 2006 2007 2008
2	Levi Stanley	366	1969 1970 1971 1972 1973
3	David Dworsky	348	1969 1970 1971
4	Steve Lehor	326	1979 1980 1981 1982
5	Nate Jackson	316	1998 1999 2000 2001
6	Adam Leonard	316	2005 2006 2007 2008
7	Corey Paredes	315	2008 2009 2010 2011
8	Jahlani Tavai	309	2015 2016 2017
9	Tadius Jefferson	298	1983 1984 1985 1986
10	Hyrum Peters	296	2000 2001 2002 2003

Single season
Rank	Player	Tackles	Year
1	Jeff Ulbrich	169	1999
2	Corey Paredes	151	2010
3	Tim Buchanan	148	1968
4	Randy Ingraham	145	1970
5	Tom Murphy	144	1977
6	Solomon Elimimian	141	2007
7	Levi Stanley	140	1973

Single game
Rank	Player	Tackles	Year	Opponent
1	Eddie Klaneski	23	1996	Fresno State

=== Sacks ===
Career
Rank	Player	Sacks	Years
1	Mark Odom	36.0	1987 1988 1989 1990
2	Al Noga	33.0	1984 1985 1986 1987
3	Melila Purcell	20.0	2003 2004 2005 2006
4	Pete Noga	19.0	1983 1985 1986
5	David Veikune	18.0	2006 2007 2008
6	Paipai Falemalu	16.5	2009 2010 2011 2012
7	Alvis Satele	16.0	1981 1982 1983 1984
	Art Laurel	16.0	2010 2011 2012 2013
9	Pisa Tinoisamoa	15.5	2000 2001 2002
10	Falaniko Noga	15.0	1980 1981 1982 1983

Single season
Rank	Player	Sacks	Year
1	Al Noga	17.0	1986

Single game
Rank	Player	Sacks	Year	Opponent
1	Mark Odom	4.0	1989	BYU

== Kicking ==
=== Field goals made ===
Career
Rank	Player	FGs	Years
1	Jason Elam	79	1988 1989 1990 1991 1992
2	Justin Ayat	59	2001 2002 2003 2004
3	Matthew Shipley	56	2020 2021 2022 2023
4	Dan Kelly	45	2005 2006 2007 2008
5	Tyler Hadden	43	2011 2012 2013 2014
6	Kansei Matsuzawa	39	2024 2025
7	Eric Hannum	36	1996 1997 1998 1999 1999
8	Richard Spelman	34	1982 1983 1984
9	Rod Valverde	29	1985 1986 1987
	Scott Enos	29	2009 2010

Single season
Rank	Player	FGs	Year
1	Kansei Matsuzawa	27	2025
2	Richard Spelman	21	1984
3	Jason Elam	20	1989
4	Jason Elam	19	1988
	Jason Elam	19	1991
	Justin Ayat	19	2001
7	Tyler Hadden	18	2014
	Matthew Shipley	18	2021
9	Scott Enos	17	2010
10	Kerry Brady	16	1985
	Jason Elam	16	1992
	Matthew Shipley	16	2022

Single game
Rank	Player	FGs	Year	Opponent
1	Reinhold Stuprich	5	1974	BYU
	Lee Larsen	5	1981	New Mexico

=== Field goal percentage ===
Career
Rank	Player	FG%	Years
1	Rigoberto Sanchez	87.5%	2015 2016
2	Kansei Matsuzawa	86.7	2024 2025
3	Jason Elam	79.0%	1988 1989 1990 1991 1992
4	Matthew Shipley	76.7%	2020 2021 2022 2023
5	Jim Asmus	74.3%	1979 1980
6	Scott Enos	72.5%	2009 2010
7	Rod Valverde	70.7%	1985 1986 1987
8	Richard Spelman	69.4%	1982 1983 1984
9	Ryan Meskell	66.7%	2017 2018 2019
10	Justin Ayat	66.3%	2001 2002 2003 2004

Single season
Rank	Player	FG%	Year
1	Rigoberto Sanchez	100.0%	2016
2	Kansei Matsuzawa	93.1	2025
3	Jason Elam	90.9%	1989
4	Matthew Shipley	85.7%	2021
5	Ryan Meskell	83.3%	2018
6	Jim Asmus	81.3%	1979
7	Scott Enos	81.0%	2010
8	Kerry Brady	80.0%	1985
	Matthew Shipley	80.0%	2022
10	Jason Elam	79.2%	1988
