= 2003 Hawaii Bowl =

2003 Sheraton Hawaii Bowl
Houston Cougars	Hawaii Warriors
(7–5)	(8–5)
C-USA	WAC
48	54
Head coach: Art Briles	Head coach: June Jones
	1	2	3	4	OT	2OT	3OT	Total
Houston	10	10	0	14	7	7	0	48
Hawaii	3	10	14	7	7	7	6	54
- Date: December 25, 2003
- Season: 2003
- Stadium: Aloha Stadium
- Location: Honolulu, Hawaii
- MVP: QB Timmy Chang (Hawaii); RB Jackie Battle (Houston)
- Referee: Ken Flaherty (Mtn. West)
- Attendance: 29,005
- Payout: US$750,000 per team

United States TV coverage
- Network: ESPN
- Announcers: Dave Barnett (Play-by-Play); Bill Curry (Analyst); Heather Cox (Sideline)

The 2003 Sheraton Hawaii Bowl was played on Christmas Day 2003, in Honolulu and matched the hometown Hawaii Warriors with the Houston Cougars. This was the second Hawaii Bowl, and the first time Hawaii and Houston played each other. The game was sponsored by Sheraton Hotels and Resorts.

== Game summary ==
Houston scored first with a 34-yard touchdown pass from quarterback Kevin Kolb to wide receiver Chad McCullar. David Bell kicked a 21-yard field goal to increase Houston's lead to 10–0. Hawaii got its first points of the game at the end of the first quarter on a 19-yard field goal. In the second quarter, Timmy Chang found wide receiver Clifton Herbert for a 49-yard touchdown pass to make the score 10–10.

Running back Jackie Battle scored on a 2-yard touchdown run for Houston, as they increased their lead to 17–10. David Bell later kicked a field goal to increase the lead to 20–10. A Hawaii field goal before half time cut the lead to 20–13.

In the third quarter, running back Michael Brewster Jr. ran in for a touchdown tying the game at 20. Timmy Chang then threw a 7-yard touchdown pass to wide receiver Jason Rivers, and Hawaii claimed its first lead of the game at 27–20. Jackie Battle scored on a 2-yard touchdown run and the score was 27–27. Jason Rivers caught a 4-yard touchdown pass to give Hawaii a 34–27 lead. In the fourth quarter, wide receiver Vincent Marshall caught an 81-yard touchdown pass to tie the game at 34. The game headed into overtime.

In overtime, Timmy Chang found Britton Komine for an 11-yard touchdown and a 41–34 Hawaii lead. Houston answered with an Anthony Evans touchdown run. After one overtime period the score was 41–41. On Houston's next possession, Jackie Battle got the handoff, and rushed 4 yards for a touchdown. The score was now 48–41 Houston. Jason Rivers tied it for Hawaii, by catching a 19-yard touchdown pass. In the third overtime period, Michael Brewster ran in for an 8-yard touchdown. The two-point conversion attempt failed leaving the score 54–48 Hawaii, and giving Houston a chance to win. Houston could not score, and that ended up being the final margin.

The game is also memorable for fighting that occurred between teams at the completion of the game, as players got into shouting matches and punches were thrown. Play-by-play announcer Dave Barnett called the ending sad and surprising.
