= John Ursua =

American football player (born 1994)

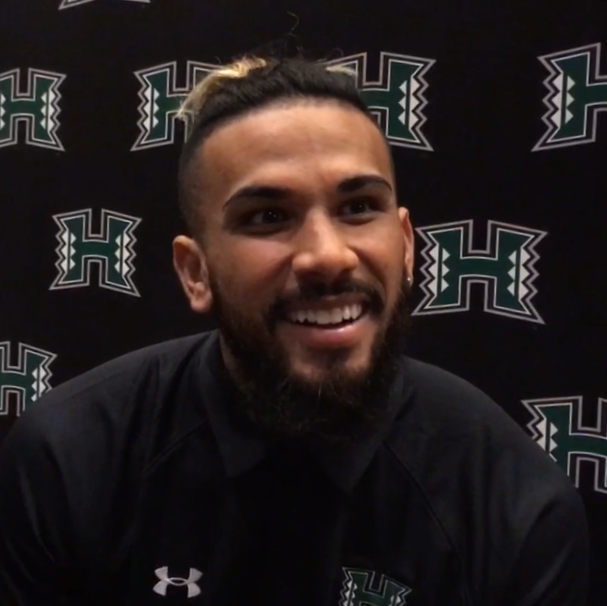
- Ursua at the 2018 MW Conference media day

Profile
- Position: Wide receiver

Personal information
- Born: January 17, 1994 (age 32); Kailua-Kona, Hawaii, U.S.
- Listed height: 5 ft 9 in (1.75 m)
- Listed weight: 182 lb (83 kg)

Career information
- High school: Cedar City (UT)
- College: Hawaii (2015-2018)
- NFL draft: 2019: 7th round, 236th overall pick

Career history
- Seattle Seahawks (2019–2021); Saskatchewan Roughriders (2023)*; BC Lions (2024)*
- * Offseason or practice squad member only

Awards and highlights
- First-team All-MWC (2018)

Career NFL statistics
- Receptions: 1
- Receiving yards: 11
- Stats at Pro Football Reference

John Ursua (born January 17, 1994), nicknamed "J-Dub", is an American professional football wide receiver. He played college football for the Hawaii Rainbow Warriors.

== Early life ==
Ursua was born in Kailua-Kona, Hawaii on January 17, 1994, and is the youngest of five children to Larry and Laurie Ursua. Ursua was a multi-sport athlete in high school earning a total of 12 varsity letters in football, baseball, and track and field. He attended Kealakehe High School in Kailua-Kona, Westlake High School in Saratoga Springs, Utah, and ultimately graduated from Cedar High School in Cedar City, Utah in 2012.

== College career ==
Ursua was an accomplished quarterback during his high school football career. He was rated by Rivals.com as the Number 10 prospect and by 247Sports as the Number 18 prospect for the state of Utah. Initially, Ursua verbally committed to BYU during his sophomore year at Westlake High School. Norm Chow, who was Utah's offensive coordinator at the time, discovered Ursua's talents as a wide receiver. After Chow was named Hawaii's head coach in December 2011, he offered a scholarship to Ursua. In between high school graduation and the start of his collegiate football career, Ursua served on a two year mission for the Church of Jesus Christ of Latter-day Saints to Paris, France.

=== Freshman season ===
Ursua was redshirted for the 2015 season.

=== Freshman (redshirt) season ===
During his sophomore season of 2016, Ursua appeared in all 14 games (13 starts) as a slot receiver. He finished second on the team with 53 receptions for 652 yards, 3 touchdowns, and two 100-yard games. He also carried the ball four times for eight yards during the season and scored his first career rushing touchdown against Nevada. He was the team's primary punt returner with eight returns for 63 yards. Despite finishing the regular season with a losing record of 6–7, Hawaii qualified for a bowl game and won the 2016 Hawaii Bowl against Middle Tennessee by a score of 52–35.

=== Sophomore (redshirt) season ===
Prior to the 2017 season, Ursua was named to the Polynesian College Football Player of the Year watch-list as well as to the Fred Biletnikoff Award watch-list for the nation's top wide receiver. He played in six games before suffering a season-ending injury against San José State on October 16. He entered that game leading the nation in receiving yards per game with 130.6 and second in receptions per game with 9.2. Despite missing half of the season, Ursua finished as the team's leader in receiving yards with 667 and receiving touchdowns with 5. He finished the season with 47 receptions, averaging 14.2 yards per catch, and produced three 100-yard receiving performances. On August 26 in a season-opening win against UMass, Ursua amassed 272 yards and one touchdown on 12 catches. The 272 yards was the best nationally in 2017 for a single game, the fourth-highest total ever by a UH player, the fourth-highest total ever by a Mountain West Conference player, and his 85-yard touchdown catch during that game was the fifth-longest catch in school history.

=== Junior (redshirt) season ===
Ursua led the nation in receiving touchdowns with 16. His 17 total touchdowns (one rushing touchdown versus Army) ranked 10th in the NCAA. He ranked fifth nationally in receiving yards with 1,343 and eighth in receiving yards per game with 103.3. He led the Mountain West in receiving touchdowns, receiving yards, receiving yards per game, and total touchdowns. He eclipsed 100-yards in seven games and scored multiple touchdowns in five games. He achieved a career-high 13 receptions in a game versus San Jose State. His senior year accomplishments included being named to the all-Mountain West first-team, selection to the Associated Press and USA Today Mid-Season All America second-team, a Semifinalist for the Biletnikoff Award, a finalist for the Polynesian Player of the Year, and named the team's Most Valuable Player. During the 2018 season, he reached the feat of having at least one catch in 30 consecutive games dating back to his first season on the team. He missed the 2018 Hawaii Bowl due to an injury, in a game that Hawaii lost to Louisiana Tech 31–14. Ursua completed his college football career ranked in Hawaii's top ten for career receptions (189, 9th), receiving yards (2,662, 9th), and receiving touchdowns (24, 7th).

=== Statistics ===
Year	GP	Rushing								Receiving					
Year	GP	Att	Gain	Loss	Net	Avg	TD	Long	Avg/G	Rec	Rec–Yards	Avg	TD	Long	Avg/G
2016	14	4	8	0	8	2	1	5	0.6	53	652	12.3	3	44	46.6
2017	6	0	0	0	0	0	0	0	0	47	667	14.2	5	85	111.2
2018	13	2	4	0	4	2	1	3	0.3	89	1,343	15.1	16	80	103.3
Total		6	12	0	12	4	2	5	0.3	189	2,662	13.7	24	85	87.3

== Professional career ==
Pre-draft measurables
Height	Weight	Arm length	Hand span	40-yard dash	10-yard split	20-yard split	20-yard shuttle	Three-cone drill	Vertical jump	Broad jump	Bench press
5 ft 9 1/8 in (1.76 m)	178 lb (81 kg)	29 7/8 in (0.76 m)	9 1/4 in (0.23 m)	4.56 s	1.58 s	2.65 s	4.16 s	6.77 s	37 in (0.94 m)	10 ft 0 in (3.05 m)	17 reps
Values from NFL Combine

"I honestly thought my chances (of getting drafted) were out the window. There were teams calling me and offering me undrafted free agent positions. I kind of just sat there patiently kind of pondering what would be my best fit if I went undrafted, then out of nowhere I get a call from Pete Carroll and they were telling me they were on the clock. I didn't see their name up there, but sure enough they got it done. It was a miracle for me."

— John Ursua

=== Seattle Seahawks ===
Despite one more year of eligibility at Hawaii, Ursua declared for the 2019 NFL draft on Christmas Day of 2018. He was selected by the Seattle Seahawks in the seventh round with the 236th overall selection. Prior to the start of the draft, the Seahawks' last pick was in the 6th Round. However, during the draft they traded a 2020 sixth-rounder to the Jacksonville Jaguars for the seventh-round pick that was ultimately used to select Ursua. He is the 72nd player in Hawaiian history to be selected in the NFL draft and the third ever selected by the Seahawks, joining M.L. Johnson in 1987 and Wayne Hunter in 2003. He was the second Rainbow Warrior selected in the 2019 Draft, joining Jahlani Tavai, a second round pick by the Detroit Lions. It is the first time Hawaii had multiple players drafted in the same year since the 2011 NFL draft when Alex Green (Green Bay Packers), Greg Salas (St. Louis Rams), and Kealoha Pilares (Carolina Panthers) were selected.

In the 2019 season, Ursua appeared in three regular season games and recorded one reception for 11 receiving yards, which occurred in Week 17 against the San Francisco 49ers.

Ursua was placed on the reserve/COVID-19 list by the team on August 9, 2020, and activated from the list three days later. He was waived on September 8, and was re-signed to the practice squad the next day. He signed a reserve/future contract with Seattle on January 13, 2021.

Ursua suffered a torn ACL in the second preseason game of 2021. He was placed on injured reserve on August 23, 2021.

=== Saskatchewan Roughriders ===
Ursua was signed to the practice roster of the Saskatchewan Roughriders of the Canadian Football League (CFL) on September 12, 2023. He was released on September 27, 2023.

=== BC Lions ===
On December 20, 2023, Ursua signed with the BC Lions of the Canadian Football League. On May 12, 2024, Ursua was placed on the reserve/suspended list. He was released by the Lions on July 20.

== Personal life ==
Ursua is an active member of the Church of Jesus Christ of Latter-day Saints and participated in mission trips to France, Belgium, and Luxembourg, and as a result speaks French. He also speaks Hawaiian.

Both of his older brothers were also college football players, having played for Southern Utah.
