= 2006 Hawaii Bowl =

2006 Sheraton Hawaii Bowl
Hawaii Warriors	Arizona State Sun Devils
(10-3)	(7-5)
WAC	Pac-10
41	24
Head coach: June Jones	Head coach: Dirk Koetter
	1	2	3	4	Total
Hawaii	0	3	21	17	41
Arizona State	3	7	0	14	24
- Date: December 24, 2006
- Season: 2006
- Stadium: Aloha Stadium
- Location: Honolulu, Hawaii
- MVP: QB Colt Brennan (Hawaii); WR Jason Rivers (Hawaii); RB Ryan Torain (Arizona State)
- Referee: Bill Alge (MAC)
- Attendance: 43,435
- Payout: US$750,000 per team<

United States TV coverage
- Network: ESPN
- Announcers: Mark Jones, David Norrie and Heather Cox

The 2006 Sheraton Hawaii Bowl was a college football bowl game that was a part of the 2006-2007 bowl game schedule of the 2006 NCAA Division I FBS football season. This was the fifth Hawaiʻi Bowl played, and was sponsored by Sheraton Hotels and Resorts. It was played on Christmas Eve 2006, at Aloha Stadium in Honolulu. The game matched the Hawaiʻi Warriors against the Arizona State Sun Devils, and was televised on ESPN.

Hawaiʻi won the contest, 41–24, finishing the season with eleven wins, tying the school record for most wins in a season with the 1992 Rainbow Warriors team that went 11–2.

== Background ==
This game received extra attention because Hawaii quarterback Colt Brennan was poised to set the NCAA single-season record for touchdown passes in a season. Entering the game, Brennan had 53 touchdown passes, one short of University of Houston quarterback David Klingler's mark of 54 set in 1990.

Brennan finished the game having completed 33-of-42 passes for 559 yards and five touchdowns, setting the new single-season record at 58. He shared MVP honors with wide receiver Jason Rivers, who tied a school mark with 14 receptions and set a record with 308 receiving yards, the most in a college bowl game since the NCAA began keeping official records in 1937.

== Scoring summary ==
=== First Quarter ===
- ASU - Jesse Ainsworth 44-yard FG. (1:59). 3-0 ASU

=== Second Quarter ===
- HAW - Dan Kelly 42-yard FG. (12:35). 3-3 Tie
- ASU - Brandon Smith 37-yard pass from Rudy Carpenter (Jesse Ainsworth kick). (5:21). 10-3 ASU

=== Third Quarter ===
- HAW - Jason Rivers 38-yard pass from Colt Brennan (Dan Kelly kick). (12:29). 10-10 Tie
- HAW - Ryan Grice-Mullen 7-yard pass from Colt Brennan (Dan Kelly kick). (8:46). 17-10 HAW
- HAW - Ryan Grice-Mullen 36-yard pass from Colt Brennan (Dan Kelly kick). (2:14). 24-10 HAW

=== Fourth Quarter ===
- HAW - Dan Kelly 43-yard FG. (13:04). 27-10 HAW
- ASU - Ryan Torain 12-yard run (Jesse Ainsworth kick). (12:21). 27-17 HAW
- ASU - Michael Jones 4-yard pass from Rudy Carpenter (Jesse Ainsworth kick). (10:25). 27-24 HAW
- HAW - Davone Bess 21-yard pass from Colt Brennan (Dan Kelly kick). (5:16). 34-24 HAW
- HAW - Jason Rivers 79-yard pass from Colt Brennan (Dan Kelly kick). (2:01). 41-24 HAW

== Aftermath ==
- Arizona State head coach Dirk Koetter was fired the month before the Hawaii Bowl, which served as his final game at ASU. Koetter was replaced in the offseason by Dennis Erickson. Koetter was hired as the offensive coordinator for the NFL's Jacksonville Jaguars.
- Hawaiʻi quarterback Colt Brennan was unsure of whether he would stay for his senior season at Hawaii or declare for the 2007 NFL draft. Brennan eventually declared for the draft, but did not sign with an agent, allowing him the opportunity to withdraw his name if he so chose. He eventually decided to withdraw from the draft and opted to return for his senior season.
- At the end of the season, Hawaiʻi was ranked #24 in the final Coaches Poll and was one spot out of making the Associated Press final poll. This was the first time Hawaiʻi finished the season ranked in the top 25 of a major poll since 1992, when the Warriors finished 20th in the AP Poll.
