= Bryant Moniz =

American gridiron football player and coach (born 1989)

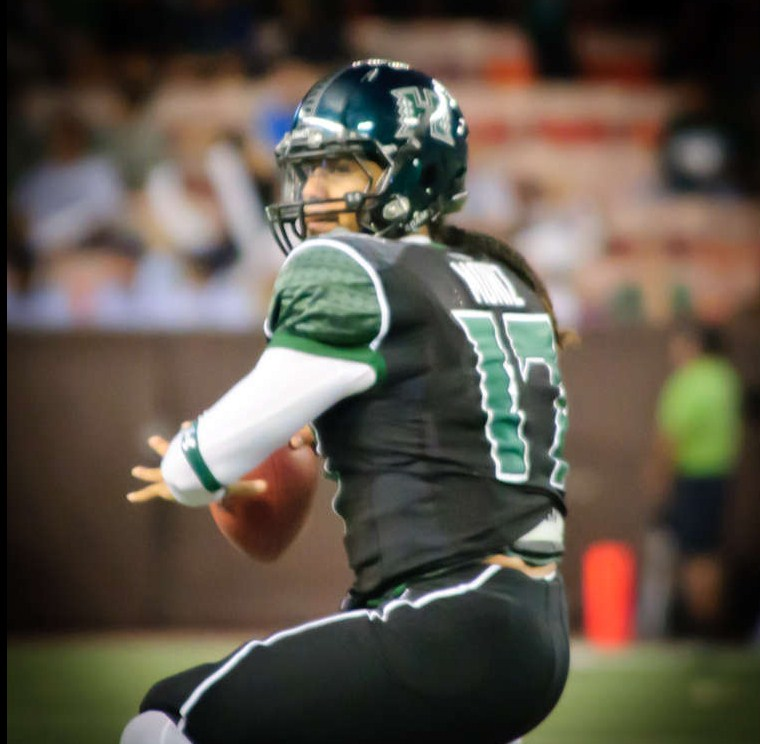
- Moniz with the Hawaii Rainbow Warriors in 2010

No. 20, 24, 18
- Position: Quarterback

Personal information
- Born: January 1, 1989 (age 37); Wahiawa, Hawaii, U.S.
- Listed height: 6 ft 0 in (1.83 m)
- Listed weight: 215 lb (98 kg)

Career information
- High school: Leilehua (Wahiawa, Hawaii)
- College: Fresno CC (2007); Hawaii (2009–2011)
- NFL draft: 2012: undrafted

Career history

Playing
- Georgia Force (2012); Calgary Stampeders (2014–2015); Saskatchewan Roughriders (2016); Hamilton Tiger-Cats (2018)

Coaching
- Moanalua HS (HI) (2020–2021) Offensive coordinator; Leilehua HS (HI) (2023–present) Offensive coordinator & quarterbacks coach

Awards and highlights
- Grey Cup champion (2014); NCAA passing yards leader (2010); 2× Second-team All-WAC (2010, 2011)

Career CFL statistics
- TD–INT: 1–0
- Passing yards: 29
- Completion percentage: 50
- Stats at CFL.ca

Career AFL statistics
- TD–INT: 16–2
- Passing yards: 875
- Completion percentage: 54.5
- Passer rating: 95.2
- Rushing touchdowns: 3
- Stats at ArenaFan.com

Bryant Moniz (born January 1, 1989) is an American former football quarterback. He played college football for the Hawaii Rainbow Warriors, and led the NCAA in passing yards in 2010. He played professionally in the Canadian Football League (CFL) and Arena Football League (AFL). Moniz is currently the offensive coordinator and quarterbacks coach at his alma mater, Leilehua High School, a position he has held since 2023.

== Early life ==
Moniz was born in Wahiawā, Hawai'i. He attended Leilehua High School in Wahiawa, where he was the starting quarterback for the Leilehua Mules for three years from 2004 to 2006. As a sophomore, Moniz passed for 2,879 yards and 27 touchdowns and led Leilehua to the state championship game. He was selected as an all-state player in both football and soccer.

== College career ==
=== Fresno City College ===
In 2007, Moniz enrolled at Fresno City College in Fresno, California. As Fresno's starting quarterback in 2007, Moniz passed for 2,268 yards and 18 touchdowns. Moniz later recalled his semester in Fresno as follows: "I lived in a studio with all eight of my animals (two bulldog puppies, two poi dogs and four rabbits). I was a real student-athlete at Fresno. I had a 4.0 (grade-point average) in my one semester there. I didn't have a car. My girlfriend was there, so I didn't go to too many parties. I pretty much went to school and played football."

After one semester in Fresno, Moniz returned to Hawaii in 2008 with his girlfriend, Kiley Kealoha. The couple had a daughter who they named Cali in tribute to their time in Fresno.

=== Hawaii ===
==== 2009 season ====
In January 2009, Moniz enrolled at the University of Hawaii and joined the Hawaii Warriors football team as a non-scholarship walk-on player. Moniz began the 2009 season as Hawaii's third-string quarterback, but won the starting job after quarterbacks Brent Rausch and Greg Alexander were injured. Moniz delivered pizzas to pay his school expenses and to support his daughter Cali, becoming "somewhat of a folk hero." He played his first game as a starter against Fresno State on October 10, 2009. Although Hawaii lost 42–17, Moniz passed for 283 yards, including two touchdowns and two interceptions. In his second game as a starter, Moniz passed for 360 yards and rushed for another 32 yards against Idaho. Later in the season, Moniz missed three consecutive games because of a tear in his left biceps. For the season, Moniz started eight games for the 2009 Hawaii Warriors football team. He completed 182 of 319 passes for 2,396 yards and 14 touchdowns. With a quarterback rating of 239.6, he ranked 29th nationally during the 2009 college football season. He also ranked 32nd in the nation with 251.3 yards of total offense per game.

==== 2010 season ====
Moniz led the Warriors to a 10-4 record as he completed 361 of 555 passes for 5,040 yards and 39 touchdowns, both of which led the nation. He threw six touchdown passes in a 66–7 win against Charleston Southern on October 2, 2010. The following week, he totaled 581 yards of total offense (532 passing yards and 49 rushing yards) in a 41–21 win over Louisiana Tech. He led the Warriors to an upset victory over previously unbeaten Nevada on October 16, 2010, as he completed 26 of 36 passes for three touchdowns and no interceptions.

==== 2011 season ====
In the fourth game of the 2011 season, Moniz tied an NCAA record by throwing seven touchdown passes in the first half in a 56–14 victory over UC Davis. Moniz completed 30 of 40 passes for 424 yards in the game.

The following week, Moniz completed 34 of 55 passes for 410 yards and four touchdowns against Louisiana Tech. After nine games, Moniz has completed 245 of 390 passes for 2,710 yards and 22 touchdowns. As of November 6, 2011, he ranked eighth among all NCAA Division I FBS players in passing yardage.

On November 12, 2011, in the game against Nevada, Moniz broke his right tibia after being sacked. Hawaii lost that game 42–28, and Moniz was out for the season. Moniz finished his career with 10,169 passing yards and 75 passing touchdowns, both of which are third in school history.

=== Statistics ===
Season	Passing							Rushing			
Season	Cmp	Att	Pct	Yds	TD	Int	Rtg	Att	Yds	Avg	TD
2009	182	319	57.1	2,396	14	10	128.4	58	117	2.0	1
2010	361	555	65.0	5,040	39	15	159.1	81	102	1.3	4
2011	245	390	62.8	2,710	22	5	137.2	80	299	3.7	8
Total	788	1,264	62.3	10,146	75	30	141.6	219	518	2.4	13

== Professional career ==
In May 2012, Bryant Moniz signed with the Georgia Force of the Arena Football League (AFL). Moniz played his first professional game on June 23, 2012, against the Utah Blaze, succeeding R. J. Archer as starting quarterback after Archer signed with an NFL team. In the 61–38 loss, Moniz completed 27 of 47 passes for 243 yards and 3 touchdowns. Moniz won his second start with Georgia the next week over the Orlando Predators, 56–53. He threw for 7 touchdowns on 21-for-29 passing over 273 yards.

Moniz was signed by the Calgary Stampeders of the Canadian Football League (CFL) on May 23, 2014. He was released in June 2016.

On June 25, 2016, Moniz signed with the CFL's Saskatchewan Roughriders. He fumbled in his only two plays from scrimmage as the Riders' 3rd down / short yardage quarterback. He was released from the team on July 11, 2016.

Moniz signed with the Hamilton Tiger-Cats of the CFL on February 8, 2018.

== Coaching career ==
Moniz was named the offensive coordinator at Moanalua High School before the start of the 2020 HHSAA season. He was named the offensive coordinator and quarterbacks coach at his alma mater, Leilehua High School in 2023.

== See also ==
- List of NCAA Division I FBS career passing yards leaders
- List of NCAA major college football yearly passing leaders
- List of NCAA major college football yearly total offense leaders
