= Timmy Chang =

American gridiron football player and coach (born 1981)

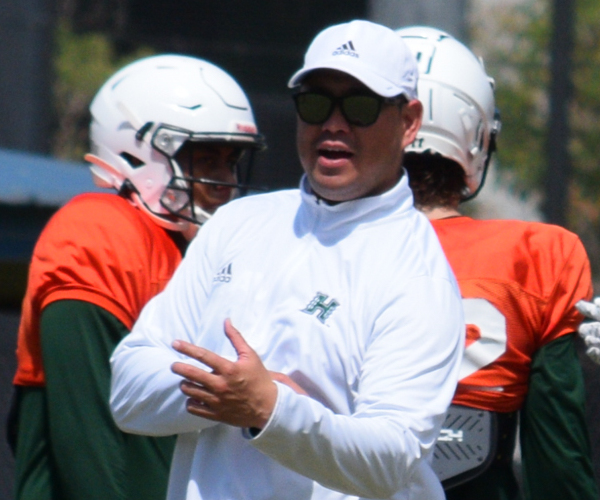
- Chang in 2022

Current position
- Title: Head coach
- Team: Hawaii
- Conference: Mountain West
- Record: 25–37

Biographical details
- Born: October 9, 1981 (age 45); Honolulu, Hawaii, U.S.
- Education: University of Hawaiʻi at Mānoa

Playing career
- 2000–2004: Hawaii
- 2005: Arizona Cardinals (Note: Offseason and/or practice squad member only)
- 2005: Detroit Lions
- 2006: Philadelphia Eagles
- 2006: Rhein Fire
- 2007–2008: Hamilton Tiger-Cats
- 2008: Winnipeg Blue Bombers
- Position: Quarterback

Coaching career (HC unless noted)
- 2012–2013: SMU (GA)
- 2014–2015: Jackson State (OC/QB)
- 2016: Emory & Henry (OC)
- 2017: Nevada (WR)
- 2018–2020: Nevada (TE)
- 2021: Nevada (WR)
- 2022–present: Hawaii

Head coaching record
- Overall: 25–37
- Bowls: 1–0

Accomplishments and honors

Awards
- As a player: First-team All-WAC (2004); Second-team All-WAC (2002); WAC Freshman of the Year (2000); 2× Hawaii Bowl MVP (2003, 2004)

Timothy Kealiiʻokaaina Awa Chang (born October 9, 1981) is an American football coach and former quarterback who is the head coach for the Hawaii Rainbow Warriors. During his playing career at Hawaii, he set several major college football passing records, including the NCAA record for most all-time passing yards; this record was later eclipsed by Case Keenum in 2011, and Dillon Gabriel in 2024, although Chang still remains in third place. He also holds the NCAA FBS record for career interceptions (80).

Chang has also played for the Arizona Cardinals, Detroit Lions, Philadelphia Eagles, Rhein Fire, Hamilton Tiger-Cats and Winnipeg Blue Bombers.

== Early years ==
Born in Waipahu, Hawaii, Chang attended St. Louis School in Honolulu and was an honors student and a three-year letterman in football and basketball. Chang was selected a prep All-American by eight major organizations and publications. As a member of the St. Louis School football team, Chang completed 464 passes for 8,001 yards and 113 touchdowns in his three-year career. Chang graduated from Saint Louis High School in 2000.

== College career ==
Following high school, Chang played five seasons (2000–2004) for the University of Hawai'i Warriors where he started 50 of 53 career games at quarterback. Chang completed 1,388 of 2,436 passes (57.0 percent) for 17,072 yards and 117 touchdowns, breaking the old NCAA Division I-A all-time records of 1,231 completions in 1,883 attempts by Kliff Kingsbury of Texas Tech University (1999–2002) and 15,031 yards by Ty Detmer of Brigham Young University (1989–91). Chang participated in 2,587 plays, breaking the old NCAA career record of 2,156 by Kingsbury. Chang's 16,910 yards in total offense broke the previous NCAA record of 14,465 by Detmer. Chang also had six rushing touchdowns and was a four-time All-Western Athletic Conference selection.

Chang currently holds NCAA Football Bowl Subdivision all-time records for total plays (2,587), passes attempted (2,436), and interceptions (80). He ranks second in total offensive yards (16,910), third in career passing yards (17,072) and is thirteenth in touchdown passes (117). Chang holds the school record for career passing yards and total offense, and is second in career passing touchdowns and total touchdowns.

Chang was named the Most Valuable Player of the 2003 Hawaii Bowl in a triple-overtime victory over the University of Houston, and was named Co-MVP, with Chad Owens, of the 2004 Hawaii Bowl in a victory over the University of Alabama at Birmingham. Chang was a finalist for the Johnny Unitas Golden Arm Award for the 2004 season. He made a cameo in NCAA Football 06.

=== College statistics ===
Legend
	FBS record
	Led NCAA Division I FBS
**Bold**	Career high

Season	Team	Games			Passing								Rushing			
Season	Team	GP	GS	Record	Cmp	Att	Pct	Yds	Avg	TD	Int	Rtg	Att	Yds	Avg	TD
2000	Hawaii	10	9	3–6	245	469	52.2	3,041	6.5	19	19	112.0	23	-49	-2.1	**2**
2001	Hawaii	3	3	1–2	83	140	59.3	1,100	**7.9**	6	6	130.9	9	-51	-5.7	0
2002	Hawaii	**14**	**14**	**10–4**	349	**624**	55.9	**4,474**	7.2	25	**22**	122.3	39	-17	-0.4	1
2003	Hawaii	13	11	7–4	353	601	58.7	4,199	7.0	29	20	126.7	**43**	-60	-1.4	1
2004	Hawaii	13	13	8–5	**358**	602	**59.5**	4,258	7.1	**38**	13	**135.4**	37	**15**	**0.4**	**2**
Career		53	50	29–21	1,388	2,436	57.0	17,072	7.0	117	80	125.1	151	-162	-1.1	6

== Professional career ==
Chang was signed by the Arizona Cardinals after going undrafted in the 2005 NFL draft, but was cut in training camp. That year, Chang also played in the preseason for the Detroit Lions but did not make the final roster. He then signed with the Philadelphia Eagles, who allocated him to the NFL Europe in 2006. He played for the Rhein Fire of NFL Europa for the 2006 season, in which he completed 50 of 89 passes for 656 yards, 4 touchdowns and 3 interceptions, while sharing playing time with Drew Henson. He was in training camp with the Philadelphia Eagles in 2006, but was cut before the start of the regular season.

The Hamilton Tiger-Cats of the CFL acquired the negotiating rights to Chang in a February 12, 2007 trade with the Edmonton Eskimos. Chang signed with Hamilton on March 13, 2007.

During the 2007 season, he started two of 18 games played, completing 42 of 89 pass attempts for 467 yards, one touchdown, and seven interceptions. Chang played in his first regular season game on June 30, 2007, against the Calgary Stampeders when he replaced the struggling Jason Maas towards the end of the fourth quarter, completing his first career CFL pass, a 51-yard pass to Jesse Lumsden, overall finishing 4 of 7 for 86 yards. He threw his first career CFL touchdown on July 14 during the Ticats 29–20 loss to Montreal, a 71-yard pass to Brock Ralph.

Chang was released by the Tiger-Cats on August 29, 2008, and signed by the Winnipeg Blue Bombers the following day. He retired in 2009 and returned to the University of Hawaii to complete his bachelor's degree.

== Coaching career ==
Southern Methodist University head football coach June Jones, who coached Chang at Hawai'i, announced in May 2012 that Chang would join his staff as a graduate assistant. Chang was chosen as the offensive coordinator and quarterbacks coach for Jackson State in February 2014, assisting newly named head coach Harold Jackson. In his first season as offensive coordinator, Jackson State averaged 25.8 points per game. QB La Montiez Ivy threw for 3,209 yards and 22 touchdowns. WR Daniel Williams finished the season with 73 catches for 1,004 yards and 9 touchdowns. Both were named to the All-SWAC team.

It was announced in December 2016 that Chang would join Nevada as an inside wide receivers coach. He moved to the tight ends coaching position in 2018 before moving back to coach wide receivers in 2021.

When Nevada's head coach Jay Norvell was hired by Colorado State following the 2021 season, Chang followed him to Fort Collins and was named the wide receivers coach for the Rams.

=== Hawaii ===
Chang was named the 25th head coach in program history at his alma mater, Hawaii, on January 22, 2022. He signed a four-year deal.

Chang received a one-year extension to his contract on December 3, keeping him with the program through at least the 2026 season, which will be Hawaii's first as a full member of the Mountain West Conference.

With a 31–19 win over the Colorado State Rams, Chang achieved his first bowl-eligible season in 2025. He received a five-year extension to his contract prior to the start of the 2026 season that will run through January 2031.

== Personal life ==
Chang and his wife have five children; he also has a son from a previous relationship. He is of Hawaiian, Chinese, Puerto Rican, English, Irish and Spanish descent.

Chang pleaded guilty to two misdemeanors in February 2010 was fined $155, agreed to undergo anger management assessment and was placed on six months' probation. Police stated he had seen a woman filming a fight in Honolulu's Pearlridge neighborhood, demanded that she stop filming, and upon her refusal and a subsequent struggle, had taken her camera and thrown it to the roof of a nearby building.

== Head coaching record ==
Year	Team	Overall	Conference	Standing	Bowl/playoffs
Hawaii Rainbow Warriors (Mountain West Conference) (2022–present)
2022	Hawaii	3–10	2–6	5th (West)	
2023	Hawaii	5–8	3–5	T–8th	
2024	Hawaii	5–7	3–4	T–5th	
2025	Hawaii	9–4	5–3	T–5th	W Hawaii
2026	Hawaii	3–8	2–6		
Hawaii:		25–37	15–24		
Total:		25–37			

== See also ==
- NCAA Division I FBS passing leaders
