= Ryan Grice-Mullen =

American gridiron football player (born 1986)

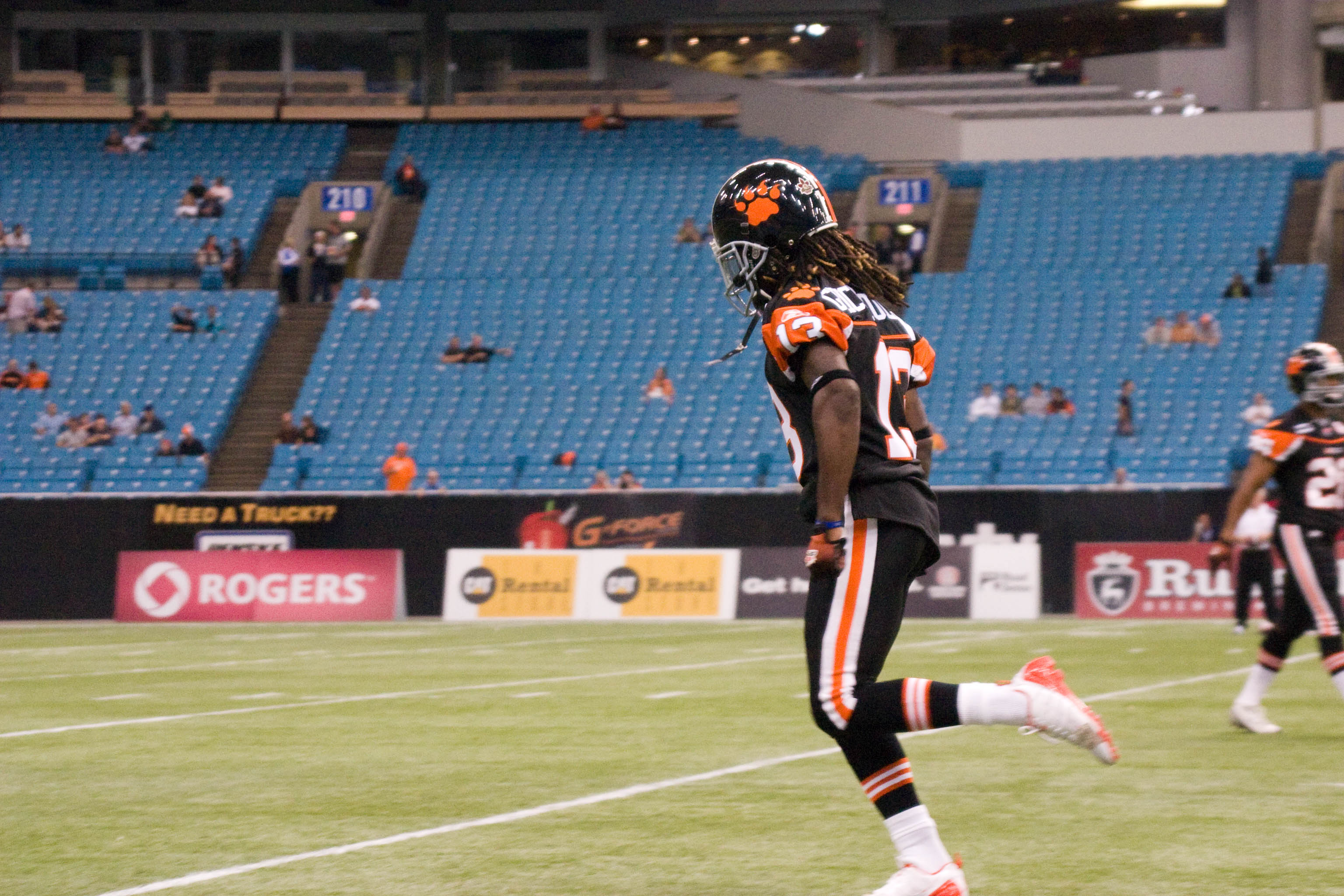
- Grice-Mullen with the BC Lions in 2009

Profile
- Position: Wide receiver

Personal information
- Born: September 12, 1986 (age 40); Rialto, California
- Listed height: 5 ft 11 in (1.80 m)
- Listed weight: 180 lb (82 kg)

Career information
- High school: Rialto
- College: Hawaii

Career history
- 2008: Houston Texans*
- 2008: Chicago Bears*
- 2008–2009: BC Lions
- 2010: Miami Dolphins*
- 2010: Saskatchewan Roughriders
- 2011: Hartford Colonials*
- 2011: Edmonton Eskimos
- * Offseason or practice squad member only

Awards and highlights
- First-team All-WAC (2007)
- Stats at CFL.ca (archive)

Ryan Grice-Mullen (born September 12, 1986) is a former gridiron football wide receiver. He was signed by the Houston Texans as an undrafted free agent in 2008. He played college football at Hawaii.

Grice-Mullen has also been a member of the Chicago Bears, BC Lions, Miami Dolphins, Saskatchewan Roughriders, Hartford Colonials and Edmonton Eskimos.

== Early life ==
Grice-Mullen attended Rialto High School in Rialto, California and was a student and lettered three times in football and once in track. In football, he played quarterback, running back, and defensive back, and as a senior, he was an All-League selection and an All-County selection. Grice-Mullen graduated from Rialto High School in 2004.

== College career ==
As a freshman for Hawaii, Grice-Mullen appeared in 12 games, starting 11 of them. He led UH's receiving corps with 1,228 yards and 12 touchdowns. He also recorded five 100+ yard receiving games. During his sophomore year, Grice-Mullen was injured for several games and started a total of nine games. During his junior year, Grice-Mullen caught 106 passes for 1372 yards and 13 touchdowns. He earned first team All-WAC honors and was part of the WAC's Special Award for Offensive Unit of the Year.

Grice-Mullen places prominently on Hawaii's career receiving lists:

- 5th in career receptions (237)
- 4th career receiving yards (3,370)
- 2nd in career receiving touchdowns (36)

== Professional career ==
=== Pre-draft ===
On January 8, 2008, he announced that he would skip his senior year of college to enter the 2008 NFL draft, though he would go undrafted.

=== Houston Texans ===
Grice-Mullen was signed as an undrafted free agent by the Houston Texans shortly after the 2008 NFL draft. However, he was released on June 13.

=== Chicago Bears ===
On July 24, 2008, Grice-Mullen was signed by the Chicago Bears. He was waived a month later on August 24.

=== BC Lions ===
Grice-Mullen was signed to the practice squad of the BC Lions on September 9, 2008, and was later placed on the active roster. During the 2008 season, Grice-Mullen caught 9 passes for 175 yards and 1 touchdown. Grice-Mullen caught a 67-yard touchdown pass in the Lions' season finale.

Grice-Mullen finished the 2009 season with 20 catches for 210 yards and one touchdown. In late November, Grice-Mullen set the CFL record for longest playoff punt return when he returned a punt for 106 yards in the second half for a touchdown. He was later named special teams player of the week.

=== Miami Dolphins ===
Grice-Mullen signed a contract with the Miami Dolphins on January 6, 2010. The move united him with fellow former Hawaii receiver and teammate Davone Bess. He was waived on August 18.

=== Saskatchewan Roughriders ===
On September 15, 2010, Grice-Mullen returned to the CFL and signed with the Saskatchewan Roughriders.

=== Edmonton Eskimos ===
On August 16, 2011, Grice-Mullen signed with the Edmonton Eskimos after slotback Fred Stamps went down with an abdominal injury
