= Ashley Lelie =

American football player and coach (born 1980)

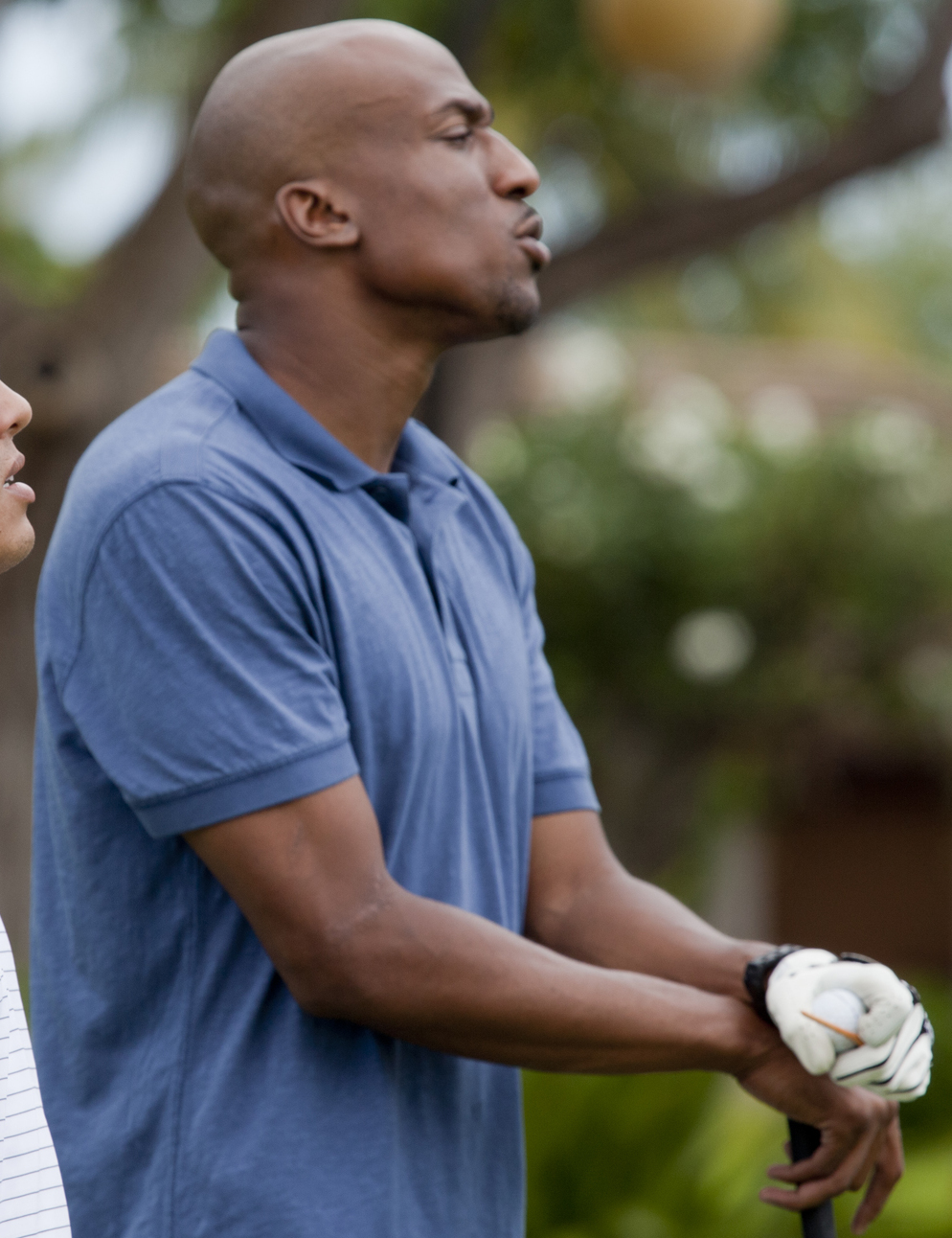
- Lelie in 2012

No. 85, 87, 18
- Position: Wide receiver

Personal information
- Born: February 16, 1980 (age 46); Bellflower, California, U.S.
- Listed height: 6 ft 3 in (1.91 m)
- Listed weight: 200 lb (91 kg)

Career information
- High school: Radford (Honolulu, Hawaii)
- College: Hawaii (1998–2001)
- NFL draft: 2002: 1st round, 19th overall pick

Career history

Playing
- Denver Broncos (2002–2005); Atlanta Falcons (2006); San Francisco 49ers (2007); Oakland Raiders (2008); Kansas City Chiefs (2009)*
- * Offseason or practice squad member only

Coaching
- Nevada (2013) Graduate assistant; Alabama A&M (2014) Wide receivers coach

Awards and highlights
- Third-team All-American (2001); First-team All-WAC (2001)

Career NFL statistics
- Receptions: 217
- Receiving yards: 3,749
- Receiving touchdowns: 15
- Stats at Pro Football Reference

Ashley Jovon Lelie (/ləˈliː/; born February 16, 1980) is an American former professional football player who was a wide receiver in the National Football League (NFL). He played college football for the Hawaii Warriors and was selected by the Denver Broncos in the first round of the 2002 NFL draft with the 19th overall pick.

Lelie also played for the Atlanta Falcons, San Francisco 49ers, Oakland Raiders, and was briefly signed by the Kansas City Chiefs, but was released before the 2009 season began.

== Early life ==
Lelie attended Radford High School in Honolulu, Hawaii, and was a three-sport standout in football, track, and basketball. In football, he won All-District and All-State honors. In basketball, he won All-District honors and in track, he won an All-League honors.

In 2006, Lelie donated a scoreboard to his alma mater. Ashley is the son of retired United States Marine Rene Allday Lelie and Annetta Lelie a nurse.

== College career ==
Lelie was a standout wide receiver at the University of Hawaiʻi at Mānoa from 1999 to 2001. He places prominently on Rainbow Warriors' career receiving lists:

- 8th in career receptions (194)
- 5th in career receiving yards (3,341)
- 4th in career receiving touchdowns (32)

== Professional career ==
Lelie was selected by the Denver Broncos with their first pick (19th overall) in the 2002 NFL Draft. He became a starter in 2004 when he recorded his best year with 54 receptions for 1,084 yards.

Lelie became unhappy in Denver at the start of the 2006 season when Denver traded for Javon Walker during the 2006 NFL draft. He skipped training camp and asked to be traded, which led to tension with head coach Mike Shanahan.

Lelie was traded to the Atlanta Falcons in a three-way deal with the Washington Redskins in August 2006, and went on to play as a backup for the San Francisco 49ers and the Oakland Raiders in subsequent seasons.

== NFL career statistics ==
Legend
	Led the league
**Bold**	Career high

=== Regular season ===
Year	Team	Games		Receiving					
Year	Team	GP	GS	Tgt	Rec	Yds	Avg	Lng	TD
2002	DEN	**16**	1	53	35	525	15.0	48	2
2003	DEN	**16**	10	81	37	628	17.0	**60**	2
2004	DEN	**16**	**16**	**101**	**54**	**1,084**	**20.1**	58	**7**
2005	DEN	**16**	13	88	42	770	18.3	56	1
2006	ATL	15	10	68	28	430	15.4	51	1
2007	SFO	15	3	27	10	115	11.5	47	0
2008	OAK	13	6	45	11	197	17.9	51	2
		107	59	463	217	3,749	17.3	60	15

=== Playoffs ===
Year	Team	Games		Receiving					
Year	Team	GP	GS	Tgt	Rec	Yds	Avg	Lng	TD
2003	DEN	1	**1**	3	1	7	7.0	7	0
2004	DEN	1	**1**	4	2	27	13.5	21	0
2005	DEN	**2**	**1**	**15**	**7**	**118**	**16.9**	**38**	**1**
		4	3	22	10	152	15.2	38	1

== Coaching career ==
In 2014 Lelie was hired by the Alabama A&M Bulldogs football team to be their wide receivers coach.

During the 2013 football season Lelie served as the offensive quality control coach for the Nevada Wolf Pack football team under new head coach Brian Polian. Lelie joined former Hawaii teammate and offensive coordinator Nick Rolovich.

== See also ==
- List of NCAA major college football yearly receiving leaders
