= Jeff Ulbrich =

American football player and coach (born 1977)

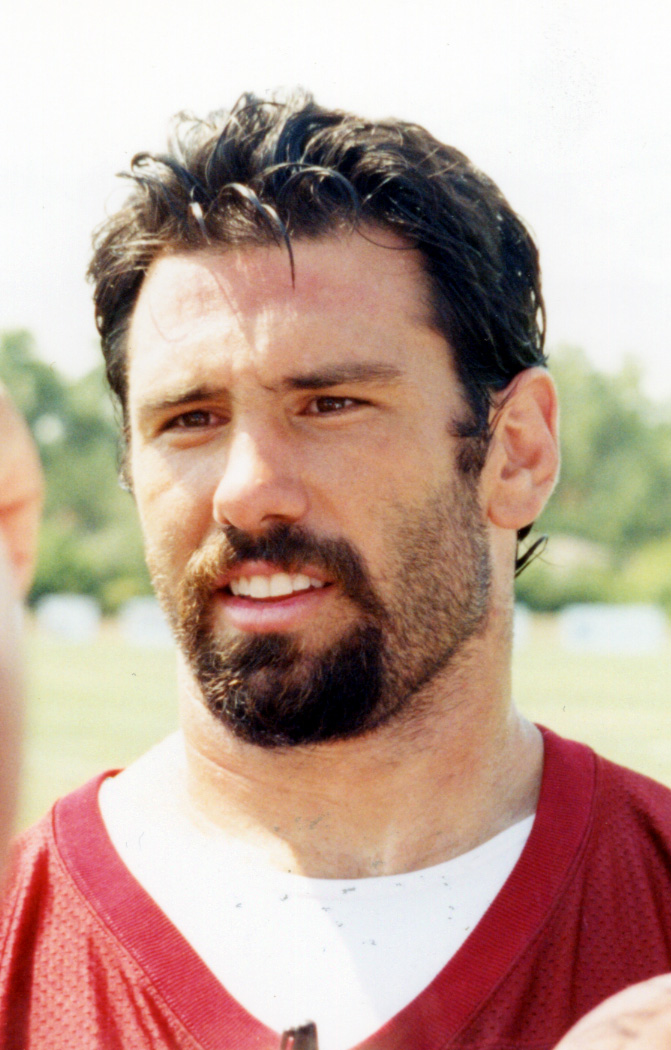
- Ulbrich with the San Francisco 49ers in 2002

Atlanta Falcons
- Title: Defensive coordinator

Personal information
- Born: February 17, 1977 (age 49); San Jose, California, U.S.
- Listed height: 6 ft 0 in (1.83 m)
- Listed weight: 240 lb (109 kg)

Career information
- Position: Linebacker (No. 53)
- High school: Live Oak (Morgan Hill, California)
- College: San Jose State (1995); Gavilan (1996); Hawaii (1997–1999)
- NFL draft: 2000: 3rd round, 86th overall pick

Career history

Playing
- San Francisco 49ers (2000–2009)

Coaching
- Seattle Seahawks (2010–2011) Assistant special teams coordinator; UCLA (2012–2014); Special teams coordinator & linebackers coach (2012); Assistant head coach, special teams coordinator & linebackers coach (2013); Defensive coordinator & inside linebackers coach (2014); Atlanta Falcons (2015–2020); Linebackers coach (2015–2019); Assistant head coach & linebackers coach (2020); Interim defensive coordinator & linebackers coach (2020); New York Jets (2021–2024); Defensive coordinator (2021–2024); Interim head coach (2024); Atlanta Falcons (2025–present) Defensive coordinator

Awards and highlights
- Pac-12 South Division champion (2012)

Career NFL statistics
- Total tackles: 501
- Sacks: 5.5
- Forced fumbles: 6
- Fumble recoveries: 2
- Interceptions: 2
- Stats at Pro Football Reference

Head coaching record
- Regular season: 3–9 (.250)
- Coaching profile at Pro Football Reference

Jeffery Wade Ulbrich (/ˈʊlbrɪk/; born February 17, 1977) is an American professional football coach and former linebacker who is the defensive coordinator for the Atlanta Falcons of the National Football League (NFL). He played college football for the Hawaii Warriors and was selected by the San Francisco 49ers in the third round (86th overall) in the 2000 NFL draft and played for the 49ers from 2000 to 2009.

After retiring as a player following the 2009 season, Ulbrich was the assistant special teams coach for the Seattle Seahawks for two seasons. He then served as the linebackers and special teams coach at UCLA for three seasons and later served as an assistant coach for the Atlanta Falcons for six seasons. From 2021 to 2024, Ulbrich served as defensive coordinator for the New York Jets, being promoted to interim head coach on October 8, 2024, following the firing of Robert Saleh. Since 2025, Ulbrich has served as the defensive coordinator for the Atlanta Falcons.

== Early life ==
Ulbrich attended Live Oak High School in Morgan Hill, California, and lettered three times in football and twice in wrestling. In football, he was a First-team All-League and team MVP. In wrestling, he won a league title (192 pounds).

== Playing career ==
=== College ===
Ulbrich redshirted in his lone season at San Jose State before transferring to Gavilan College. He earned first-team All-Conference and team MVP in lone season at Gavilan College in Gilroy, California. He was a two-year starter at Hawaii. He earned All-WAC first-team selection and team co-captain as a senior. He started all 12 games at middle linebacker. He led the conference with a school-record 169 tackles (42 solo) his senior year. Ulbrich set a school record with 127 assisted tackles, breaking the old mark of 97. He ranked third in the league with eight sacks for 67 yards. He had 15 tackles for loss (58 yards). He was credited with eight quarterback pressures, two fumble recoveries and one forced fumble. He returned two interceptions for 38 yards and had one pass defensed. He played in seven games, starting three at strong side inside linebacker as a junior. He finished with 41 tackles (28 solo), including a nine-yard sack. He caused and recovered a fumble.

Pre-draft measurables
Height	Weight	Arm length	Hand span	40-yard dash	10-yard split	20-yard split	20-yard shuttle	Three-cone drill	Vertical jump	Broad jump	Bench press
6 ft 0 3/8 in (1.84 m)	249 lb (113 kg)	31 in (0.79 m)	9 3/4 in (0.25 m)	4.66 s	1.57 s	2.69 s	4.30 s	7.23 s	32.0 in (0.81 m)	9 ft 1 in (2.77 m)	24 reps
All values from NFL Combine

=== San Francisco 49ers ===
Ulbrich was selected out of the University of Hawaiʻi at Mānoa by the San Francisco 49ers in the third round (86th pick overall) of the 2000 NFL draft. He only saw action in four games during his rookie season due to a right shoulder injury. He won the starting job in 2001. In 2005, he started only five games at inside linebacker before missing the remainder of the season with a torn biceps muscle. He started in 9 out of 16 games in 2006. Ulbrich took a backup role to first round pick Patrick Willis, and also a role on special teams. He was placed on injured reserve on October 19, 2009, after he suffered a concussion. Ulbrich announced his plans to retire as a result of the concussion on December 9. Upon retirement, he said that he would like to become a college football coach one day.

== Coaching career ==
=== Seattle Seahawks ===
On January 29, 2010, Ulbrich was hired by the Seattle Seahawks as a special teams assistant.

=== UCLA ===
In 2012, Ulbrich became the UCLA Bruins linebackers and special teams coach. Ulbrich was elevated to Assistant Head Coach in the spring of 2012, in addition to his duties with the linebackers and special teams. In February 2014, he was promoted to Defensive Coordinator. Two of his linebacker group, Anthony Barr and Jordan Zumwalt, were selected in the 2014 NFL Draft. Ulbrich's defensive unit was ranked third in the Pac-12 in total defense for 2014. It was led by the Butkus and Lott IMPACT Trophy winner linebacker Eric Kendricks. One of his players, Anthony Barr led the nation in sacks with 13.5.

=== Atlanta Falcons (first stint) ===
In 2015, Ulbrich was hired by the Atlanta Falcons as a linebackers coach.

In the 2016 season, Ulbrich and the Falcons reached Super Bowl LI, where they faced the New England Patriots. In the Super Bowl, the Falcons fell in a 34–28 overtime defeat.

In 2020, Ulbrich was promoted to assistant head coach and linebackers coach.

On October 12, 2020, Ulbrich was named defensive coordinator under interim head coach Raheem Morris, as part of a midseason shakeup of the coaching staff.

=== New York Jets ===
On January 21, 2021, Ulbrich was hired by the New York Jets as their defensive coordinator under head coach Robert Saleh. On October 8, 2024, Ulbrich was named interim head coach of the Jets following the firing of head coach Robert Saleh after a 2–3 start of the 2024 season. After losing his first three games as coach, Ulbrich got his first win as a head coach on October 31, against the Houston Texans. Ulbrich finished his stint as Jets interim head coach with a 3–9 record.

=== Atlanta Falcons (second stint) ===
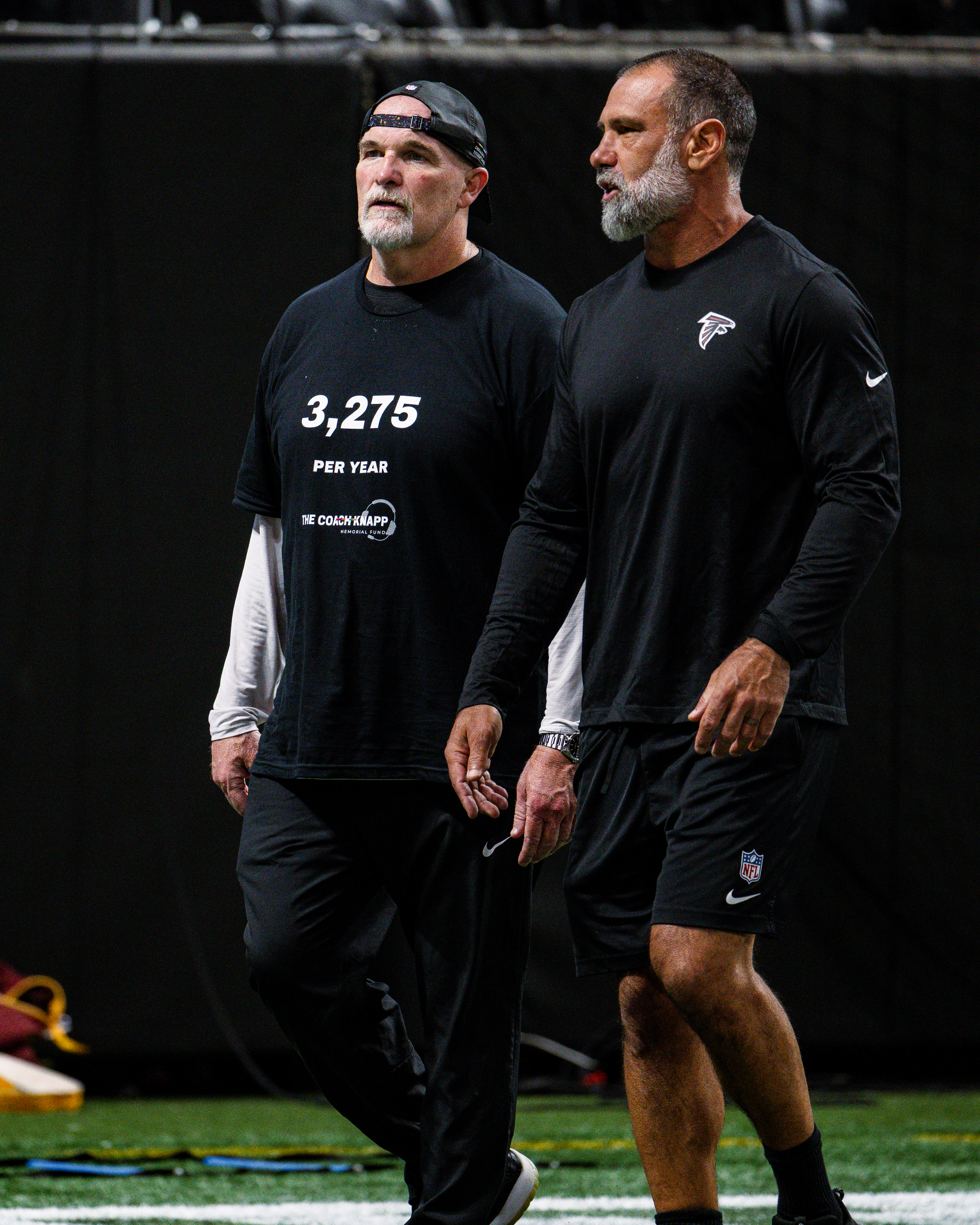
Ulbrich (right) speaking with Dan Quinn in 2025

On January 18, 2025, Ulbrich was hired by the Atlanta Falcons as their defensive coordinator under head coach Raheem Morris.

On January 19, 2026, the Falcons announced that Ulbrich would remain in his same position on the staff of new head coach, Kevin Stefanski. The Falcons granted Ulbrich an excused leave of absence at the start of training camp so he could be with his wife, before she died of cancer.

== Career statistics ==
=== Playing career ===
Legend
**Bold**	Career high

==== Regular season ====
Year	Team	Games		Tackles					Interceptions					Fumbles			
Year	Team	GP	GS	Cmb	Solo	Ast	Sck	TFL	Int	Yds	TD	Lng	PD	FF	FR	Yds	TD
2000	SF	4	0	1	0	1	0.0	0	0	0	0	0	0	0	0	0	0
2001	SF	14	14	88	64	**24**	0.5	6	0	0	0	0	1	**2**	0	0	0
2002	SF	14	13	70	47	23	1.5	3	0	0	0	0	0	1	0	0	0
2003	SF	15	**15**	79	58	21	**2.5**	5	**1**	7	0	7	**5**	1	**1**	0	0
2004	SF	**16**	14	**93**	**74**	19	1.0	**9**	**1**	**19**	0	**19**	3	1	0	0	0
2005	SF	5	5	42	32	10	0.0	3	0	0	0	0	3	1	0	0	0
2006	SF	**16**	9	64	46	18	0.0	3	0	0	0	0	0	0	0	0	0
2007	SF	**16**	2	45	31	14	0.0	3	0	0	0	0	1	0	**1**	0	0
2008	SF	**16**	3	18	14	4	0.0	0	0	0	0	0	0	0	0	0	0
2009	SF	4	0	1	0	1	0.0	0	0	0	0	0	0	0	0	0	0
Career		120	75	501	366	135	5.5	32	2	26	0	19	13	6	2	0	0

==== Playoffs ====
Year	Team	Games		Tackles					Interceptions					Fumbles			
Year	Team	GP	GS	Cmb	Solo	Ast	Sck	TFL	Int	Yds	TD	Lng	PD	FF	FR	Yds	TD
2001	SF	1	1	3	2	1	0.0	0	0	0	0	0	0	0	0	0	0
2002	SF	**2**	**2**	**15**	**10**	**5**	0.0	**1**	0	0	0	0	**1**	**1**	0	0	0
Career		3	3	18	12	6	0.0	1	0	0	0	0	1	1	0	0	0

=== Head coaching record ===
Team	Year	Regular season					Postseason			
Team	Year	Won	Lost	Ties	Win %	Finish	Won	Lost	Win %	Result
NYJ	2024*	3	9	0	.250	3rd in AFC East	—	—	—	—
Total		3	9	0	.250		—	—	—	

- Interim head coach

== Personal life ==
Ulbrich and his late wife, Cristina, have three children together. Cristina died on July 26, 2026, after a battle with cancer.

Ulbrich's son came to media attention in April 2025 after he was involved in a prank call to Shedeur Sanders during the 2025 NFL draft, in which his friend pretended to be Saints general manager Mickey Loomis selecting Sanders before saying "you're gonna have to wait a little bit longer." Ulbrich's son got the private phone number from his father's unlocked iPad, and later apologized for his involvement. The NFL fined the Falcons $250,000 and Ulbrich $100,000 for the incident. The league said the fines stemmed from the organization’s failure to prevent the disclosure of confidential information distributed to the club in advance of the NFL Draft.
