= Jason Rivers =

American football player (born 1985)

Profile
- Position: Wide receiver

Personal information
- Born: May 12, 1984 (age 42); Honolulu, Hawaii
- Listed height: 6 ft 2 in (1.88 m)
- Listed weight: 189 lb (86 kg)

Career information
- College: Hawaii

Career history
- Tennessee Titans (2008)*
- * Offseason or practice squad member only

Jason Rivers (born May 12, 1984) is an American former gridiron football wide receiver. He played college football for the Hawaii Warriors, and was a favorite target of record-setting quarterback Colt Brennan.

Rivers places prominently on Hawaii's career receiving lists:

- 2nd in career receptions (292)
- 2nd in career receiving yards (3,919)
- 3rd in career receiving touchdowns (35)

After not being selected in the 2008 NFL draft, he was signed by the Tennessee Titans as a free agent but subsequently released.

Rivers is of Samoan and African American descent. Prior to playing college football, Rivers attended Saint Louis School in Honolulu.

== See also ==
- 2006 Hawaii Bowl, during which Rivers and Brennan set several Hawaii Bowl records and were named co-MVPs
