= Nate Ilaoa =

American football player and administrator (born 1983)

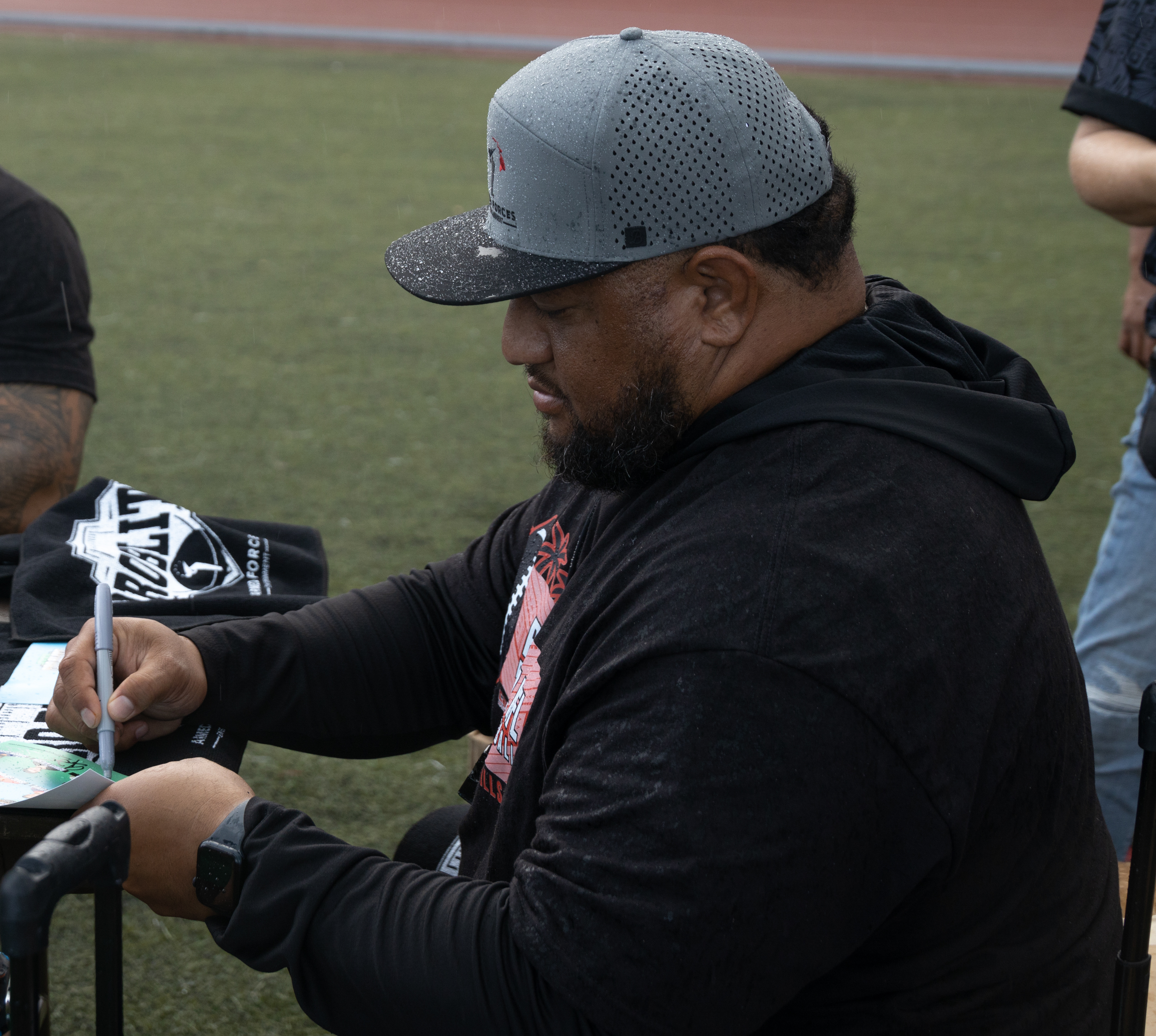
- Ilaoa at Marine Corps Base Hawaii in 2025

No. 48
- Position: Running back

Personal information
- Born: April 4, 1983 (age 43); Oakland, California, U.S.
- Listed height: 5 ft 9 in (1.75 m)
- Listed weight: 245 lb (111 kg)

Career information
- High school: North Stafford (Stafford, Virginia)
- College: Hawaii
- NFL draft: 2007: 7th round, 236th overall pick

Career history

Playing
- Philadelphia Eagles (2007)*; Columbus Destroyers (2008)
- * Offseason or practice squad member only

Operations
- Moanalua HS (HI) (2015) Running backs coach; Moanalua HS (HI) (2016) Offensive coordinator; Kahuku HS (HI) (2017) Running backs coach; Punahou (HI) (2018) Running backs coach; Moanalua HS (HI) (2019) Offensive coordinator & running backs coach; Waipahu HS (HI) (2021) Offensive coordinator & strength/conditioning coach; Hawaii (2022) Director of recruiting; Hawaii (2023) Director of player development; Farrington HS (HI) (2024–present) Co-offensive coordinator

Awards and highlights
- First-team All-WAC (2006)

Nathan Filipo Ilaoa (born April 4, 1983) is an American former professional football player who was a running back in the National Football League (NFL). He was selected by the Philadelphia Eagles in the seventh round of the 2007 NFL draft. He played college football for the Hawaii Warriors.

Ilaoa was also a member of the Columbus Destroyers.

== Early life ==
Ilaoa played high school football at North Stafford High School in Stafford, Virginia as both a wide receiver and running back. In his junior season, he set the Virginia AAA record for receiving yards in a season (1,299 in 12 games). Ilaoa was the 2000 Washington Post Offensive Player of the Year and two-time All-Met.

== College career ==
Ilaoa began his collegiate career on the Hawaii Warriors football team in 2001. Ilaoa started 8 games in the 2002 season as a wide receiver. In 2005, Ilaoa moved to the running back position and rushed for a team-high 643 yards. He was granted a rare sixth year of eligibility because of injuries in 2006 and amassed 1,827 all-purpose yards. Ilaoa's 20 career rushing touchdowns are sixth in Hawaii history.

== Professional career ==
=== Philadelphia Eagles ===
Ilaoa was selected 236th overall in the 2007 NFL draft by the Philadelphia Eagles. On July 22, 2007, Ilaoa agreed to a four-year contract with the Eagles. He was cut by the Eagles on September 1.

=== Columbus Destroyers ===
In 2008, Ilaoa played with the Columbus Destroyers of the Arena Football League. However, he was eventually sidelined by a shoulder injury. At the end of that season, the Arena Football League ceased operations.
