= Mana Silva =

American football player (born 1988)

No. 36, 30
- Position: Safety

Personal information
- Born: August 17, 1988 (age 38); Wahiawa, Hawaii, U.S.
- Listed height: 6 ft 1 in (1.85 m)
- Listed weight: 214 lb (97 kg)

Career information
- High school: Kamehameha Schools (Keaau, Hawaii)
- College: Hawaii
- NFL draft: 2011: undrafted

Career history
- Baltimore Ravens (2011)*; Buffalo Bills (2011)*; Dallas Cowboys (2011−2012); Buffalo Bills (2012)
- * Offseason or practice squad member only

Awards and highlights
- All-WAC (2010)

Career NFL statistics
- Games played: 12
- Total tackles: 7
- Stats at Pro Football Reference

Keanemana "Mana" Silva (born August 17, 1988) is an American former professional football player who was a free safety in the National Football League (NFL) for the Baltimore Ravens, Buffalo Bills and Dallas Cowboys. He was signed by the Baltimore Ravens as an undrafted free agent in 2011. He played college football for the Hawaii Warriors.

== Early life ==
Silva attended Kamehameha Schools in Keaau, Hawaii, where he practiced football, baseball, basketball and track. As a senior, he received All-state honors as a quarterback.

He also was named All-state in baseball as a senior. He was a member of league championship teams in football, baseball and basketball.

== College career ==
Silva accepted a football scholarship from Oregon State University. He was redshirted as a freshman and was moved from quarterback to wide receiver. At the end of the year he transferred to the University of Hawaii at Manoa, to be closer to his family. In 2007, he sat out due to NCAA transfer rules.

As a sophomore, he was converted into a safety. He appeared in 11 games, playing mostly on special teams. He collected 10 tackles (8 solo) and one pass defensed.

As a junior, he became a starter at free safety. He appeared in all 13 games (10 starts), recording 74 tackles (2 for loss), 6 interceptions (eleventh in the nation), 10 passes defensed and one quarterback hurry.

As a senior, he registered 85 tackles (second on the team), 3 tackles for loss, 8 interceptions (second in the nation), 15 passes defensed and one fumble recovery. He finished his college career with 169 tackles (5 for loss), 14 interceptions (school record), 26 passes defensed and one fumble recovery.

== Professional career ==
=== Baltimore Ravens ===
Silva was signed as an undrafted free agent by the Baltimore Ravens after the 2011 NFL draft. He was waived on September 3 and signed to the practice squad the next day. He was cut on September 6 and re-signed on September 21. He was released on November 1.

=== Buffalo Bills ===
On November 10, 2011, he was signed to the Buffalo Bills' practice squad. To make room for Silva, the Bills released safety Delano Howell.

=== Dallas Cowboys ===
On December 13, 2011, he was signed off the Bill's practice squad to the Dallas Cowboys, after safety Barry Church suffered a shoulder injury against the New York Giants. He appeared in the final 2 games of the season as a backup safety, making 4 special teams tackles.

In 2012, he played in the first 3 games of the season, making 2 defensive tackles and one special teams stop. On September 27, he was released to make room for punter Brian Moorman.

=== Buffalo Bills (second stint) ===
On October 2, 2012, Silva was signed to the Buffalo Bills' practice squad. On November 8, he was promoted to the active roster. He appeared in 7 games as a backup safety.

On August 6, 2013, he left training camp to solve personal matters and was placed on the exempt-left squad list. He never returned to the team.

== Personal life ==
Silva is of Native Hawaiian and Samoan descent. In March 2015, he was invited to the inaugural NFL veteran combine, but he wasn't signed by a team.
