= Joey Iosefa =

American Samoan football and rugby union player (born 1991)

No. 33, 47
- Position: Fullback

Personal information
- Born: June 19, 1991 (age 35); Pago Pago, American Samoa
- Listed height: 6 ft 0 in (1.83 m)
- Listed weight: 245 lb (111 kg)

Career information
- High school: Faga'itua (Pago Pago, American Samoa)
- College: Hawaii
- NFL draft: 2015: 7th round, 231st overall pick

Career history
- Tampa Bay Buccaneers (2015)*; New England Patriots (2015)
- * Offseason or practice squad member only

Career NFL statistics
- Rushing attempts: 15
- Rushing yards: 51
- Rushing average: 3.4
- Stats at Pro Football Reference

Joey Iosefa
Rugby union career
- Position: Outside center
Senior career
Years	Team	Apps	(Points)
2018	Houston SaberCats	6	(5)
2019–	Seattle Seawolves	6	(0)
- Correct as of February 19, 2021

Marvin Joey Iosefa (born June 19, 1991) is an American Samoan former professional football fullback. He played college football at Hawaii, and was selected by the Tampa Bay Buccaneers of the National Football League (NFL) in the seventh round of the 2015 NFL draft. He was also a member of the New England Patriots. Born on American Samoa, Iosefa is a 2009 graduate of Faga'itua High School.

== Professional career ==
=== American football ===
==== Tampa Bay Buccaneers ====
In the 2015 NFL draft, Iosefa was selected by the Tampa Bay Buccaneers in the seventh round (231st overall). He was waived on August 30, 2015, as part of Tampa Bay's final roster cutdowns.

==== New England Patriots ====
The New England Patriots signed Iosefa to their practice squad on October 21, 2015. On December 19, 2015, he was promoted to the Patriots' active roster. He made his NFL debut on December 20, 2015, in the Patriots' 33–16 win over the Tennessee Titans. Iosefa racked up 51 yards on 14 carries to lead the Patriots in rushing yards for the game. On December 28, 2015, he was waived by the Patriots. On December 30, 2015, he was signed to the Patriots' practice squad.

On January 26, 2016, Iosefa signed a futures contract with the Patriots. He was released by the Patriots on May 6, 2016, but was re-signed on May 13. On September 3, 2016, he was released by the Patriots as part of final roster cuts.

=== Rugby union ===
After his departure from the Patriots, Iosefa joined the Houston SaberCats of Major League Rugby (MLR) for the 2018 season. He played play five matches with the SaberCats. He later joined the Seattle Saracens of the CDI Premier League. Then on March 30, 2019, Iosefa was announced to join the Seattle Seawolves of MLR for their match on March 31.
