= Greg Salas =

American football player (born 1988)

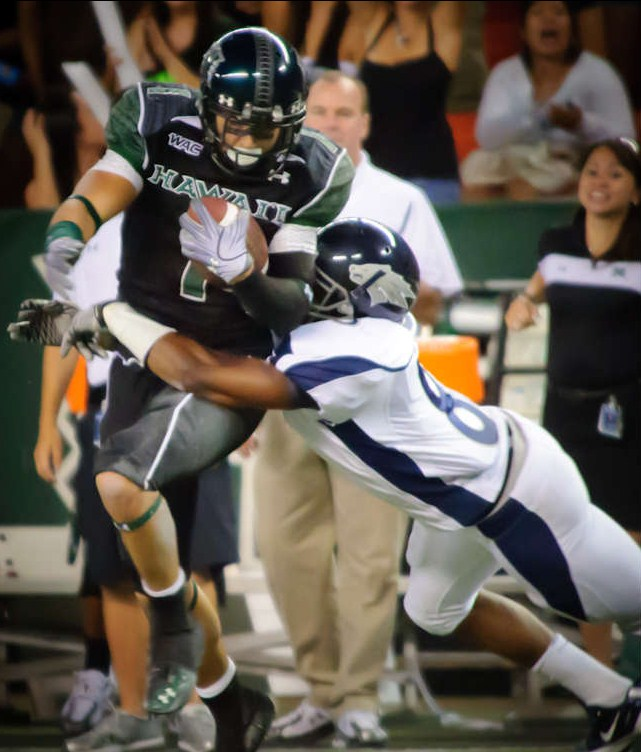
- Salas with the Hawaii Warriors in 2010

No. 87, 17, 19, 11
- Position: Wide receiver

Personal information
- Born: August 25, 1988 (age 38); Chino, California, U.S.
- Listed height: 6 ft 1 in (1.85 m)
- Listed weight: 210 lb (95 kg)

Career information
- High school: Chino
- College: Hawaii
- NFL draft: 2011: 4th round, 112th overall pick

Career history
- St. Louis Rams (2011); New England Patriots (2012); Philadelphia Eagles (2012–2013); New York Jets (2013–2014); Detroit Lions (2015)*; Buffalo Bills (2015–2016)
- * Offseason or practice squad member only

Awards and highlights
- Third-team All-American (2010); 2× First-team All-WAC (2009, 2010); Hawaii Bowl MVP (2010)

Career NFL statistics
- Receptions: 50
- Receiving yards: 704
- Receiving touchdowns: 1
- Rushing yards: 28
- Rushing touchdowns: 1
- Stats at Pro Football Reference

Greg Salas (born August 25, 1988) is an American former professional football player who was a wide receiver in the National Football League (NFL). He was selected by the St. Louis Rams in the fourth round of the 2011 NFL draft. He played college football for the Hawaii Warriors.

== College career ==
While at Hawaii, Salas amassed 285 receptions, 4,345 receiving yards and 26 touchdowns and is the school's career leader in receiving yards. In 2006 Salas redshirted and the following season, 2007, he played in eight games at wideout and posted three catches for 35 yards and one touchdown. During the 2008 season, Salas started all 14 games at wideout and caught 57 passes for a team-high 831 yards and scored three touchdowns, averaging 14.6 yards per catch.

In 2009 Salas moved to slot receiver in the Hawaii offense and finished third in the country in receiving yards with 1,590. He also caught 106 passes and 8 touchdowns. For his efforts, he was First-team All-WAC.

In 2010, he broke Hawaii single-season records with 119 receptions and 1,889 yards in 2010. His 1,675 were the most of any receiver during the NCAA regular season and 10 yards more than 2nd place Justin Blackmon. He was selected Third-team All-American (AP) and also selected to Phil Steele's Second-team All-America and SI.com's honorable mention All-America. He was a semi-finalist for the Fred Biletnikoff Award, given to the nation's top receiver and was First-team All-WAC for the second consecutive season.

== Professional career ==
Pre-draft measurables
Height	Weight	Arm length	Hand span	Wingspan	40-yard dash	10-yard split	20-yard split	20-yard shuttle	Three-cone drill	Vertical jump	Broad jump	Bench press
6 ft 1 1/8 in (1.86 m)	210 lb (95 kg)	32 in (0.81 m)	9 1/4 in (0.23 m)	6 ft 3 1/4 in (1.91 m)	4.53 s	1.58 s	2.66 s	4.10 s	6.65 s	37 in (0.94 m)	10 ft 0 in (3.05 m)	15 reps
All values from NFL Combine

=== St. Louis Rams ===
Salas was selected by the St. Louis Rams with the 112th pick in the 2011 NFL draft. On July 29, 2011, Salas signed a four-year contract with the Rams that included a $451,000 signing bonus.

=== New England Patriots ===
On September 1, 2012, Salas was acquired by the New England Patriots for a 2015 draft pick. He was released by the Patriots on September 18, 2012, but re-signed to the team's practice squad two days later. On November 17, 2012, Salas was called up to the active roster of the Patriots after veteran Deion Branch was waived. Five days later on November 22, he was released. He was expected to be signed to the practice squad, but was claimed off of waivers by the Eagles.

=== Philadelphia Eagles ===
On November 23, 2012, he was claimed off waivers by the Eagles. The Eagles cut WR Mardy Gilyard to clear a roster spot for Salas. He was released on August 31, 2013, and was consequently signed to the Eagles practice squad.

=== New York Jets ===
The New York Jets signed Salas off the Eagles' practice squad on October 15, 2013. Salas was placed on injured reserve on December 4, 2014.

=== Detroit Lions ===
Salas was signed to a one-year contract by the Detroit Lions on May 13, 2015. On September 5, 2015, Salas was cut from the Lions after suffering a serious knee injury in the final preseason game on September 3, 2015, against the Buffalo Bills. Salas finished the preseason leading the team with 10 receptions for 138 yards and one touchdown.

=== Buffalo Bills ===
The Buffalo Bills signed Salas on December 22, 2015, reuniting with Head Coach Rex Ryan, who he played for when he was head coach of the Jets. On January 4, 2016, the BIlls signed him to a contract extension. On September 15, 2016, Salas scored his first career receiving touchdown, a 71-yard reception against the New York Jets. He was placed on injured reserve on October 7, 2016. He was released by the Bills on November 4, 2016.

=== Retirement ===
On August 23, 2017, Salas announced his retirement from professional football.

== Personal life ==
Salas is of Mexican American descent. He currently is employed as an associate general manager for IMG Sports Marketing, a firm associated with Hawaii Athletics.

== See also ==
- List of NCAA major college football yearly receiving leaders
