= Raphel Cherry =

American football player (born 1961)

No. 37, 45
- Position: Defensive back

Personal information
- Born: December 19, 1961 (age 64); Little Rock, Arkansas, U.S.

Career information
- College: Hawaii
- NFL draft: 1985: 5th round, 122nd overall pick

Career history
- 1985: Washington Redskins
- 1986: San Francisco 49ers
- 1987–1988: Detroit Lions

Awards and highlights
- Second-team All-WAC (1984)
- Stats at Pro Football Reference

Raphel Jerome Cherry (born December 19, 1961) is an American former professional football player who was a defensive back in the National Football League (NFL) for the Washington Redskins and the Detroit Lions. He was selected by Washington in the fifth round of the 1985 NFL draft with the 122nd overall pick. He played college football at the University of Hawaii.

In 1999, Cherry was convicted of first degree murder for killing his estranged wife, Jerri Cherry. Initially sentenced to life imprisonment, his sentence was reduced to 30 years following a successful appeal. Cherry became eligible for parole in 2019 and was released on parole in July 2023.
