= Gary Allen (gridiron football) =

American gridiron football player (1960–2023)

No. 31, 21, 23, 36
- Positions: Running back Return specialist

Personal information
- Born: April 23, 1960; Baldwin Park, California, U.S.
- Died: July 8, 2023 (aged 63); Los Angeles, California, U.S.
- Listed height: 5 ft 10 in (1.78 m)
- Listed weight: 185 lb (84 kg)

Career information
- High school: Baldwin Park
- College: Hawaii (1978–1981)
- NFL draft: 1982: 6th round, 148th overall pick

Career history
- Houston Oilers (1982–1983); Dallas Cowboys (1983–1984); Calgary Stampeders (1986–1988); Winnipeg Blue Bombers (1988)

Awards and highlights
- 2× Eddie James Memorial Trophy (1988, 1987); CFL All-Star (1986); 2× CFL West All-Star (1986, 1987); CFL rushing yards leader (1986); 3× First-team All-WAC (1979–1981)

Career NFL statistics
- Rushing yards: 7
- Rushing average: 2.3
- Reception: 2
- Receiving yards: 35
- Receiving touchdowns: 1
- Return yards: 1,695
- Return touchdowns: 1
- Stats at Pro Football Reference

Career CFL statistics
- Rushing yards: 2,163
- Rushing average: 5.4
- Rushing touchdowns: 10
- Receptions: 79
- Receiving yards: 743
- Receiving touchdowns: 3
- Return yards: 1,439

Gary Eugene Allen (April 23, 1960 – July 8, 2023) was an American professional football player who was a running back and return specialist in the National Football League (NFL) and Canadian Football League (CFL). He played in the NFL for the Houston Oilers and Dallas Cowboys. He also was a member of the Calgary Stampeders and Winnipeg Blue Bombers in the CFL. He played college football for the Hawaii Rainbow Warriors.

== Early life ==
Gary Eugene Allen was born on April 23, 1960. He attended Baldwin Park High School, where he practiced football and track.

Allen accepted a football scholarship from the University of Hawaii, where he was initially recruited to play wide receiver. During a bye-week scrimmage between backups and redshirts in his freshman season, the team was short at running back and he was temporarily used at the position for depth purposes. After showing his running skills and dominating the practice, he was permanently switched and was named the starter against the University of the Pacific, where he ran for 92 yards. He finished his freshman year with a school record 521 rushing yards in half a season.

Though there were concerns about his size, his open-field elusiveness and strength made him one of the top players in the Western Athletic Conference. He ran from the I formation and was teamed with fullback David Toloumu. He also was a teammate of Mark Tuinei and Jesse Sapolu.

As a sophomore, he posted 1,040 rushing yards, six over 100-yard games and averaged more than 6 yards per carry. His accomplishments included a four-game 100-plus yards rushing streak, a six-carry 112-yard cameo against Prairie View A&M University, a 202-yard game against the University of Texas at El Paso, a 141-yard, three-touchdown performance against Temple University and a 155-yard game in an upset win against Arizona State University. He was invited to play in the Hula Bowl as a wide receiver.

Because of the field conditions at Aloha Stadium, he suffered from turf toe injuries in his last two years. As a junior, he had a down season with 884 rushing yards, 2 rushing touchdowns, 26 receptions for 257 yards and one touchdown.

As a senior, he recorded 1,006 rushing yards (five 100-yard rushing games), including 189 yards against San Diego State University. He helped the team accomplish a 9-2 record and their first in season top-20 Associated Press ranking.

Allen finished his college career as the school's all-time rushing leader (3,451 yards) and is considered to be one of its greatest football players. At the time he also set 20 school records including: 4,558 career all-purpose yards, career rushing attempts (647), career 100-yard games (15), 1,000-yard rushing seasons (2), career receiving yards for a running back (895 yards), career receptions for a running back (73), career touchdowns (19) and single-game rushing yards (247).

In 1998, he was inducted into the University of Hawaii ring of honor.

== Professional career ==
=== Houston Oilers ===
Allen was selected by the Houston Oilers in the sixth round (148th overall) of the 1982 NFL draft, after dropping due to concerns about his short stature. He played in 8 games returning punts and kickoffs. On September 8, 1983, he was waived to make room for running back Vagas Ferguson.

=== Dallas Cowboys ===
On September 29, 1983, he was signed as a free agent by the Dallas Cowboys to replace an injured Chuck McSwain. He played only on special teams, returning punts and kickoffs. Against the Kansas City Chiefs, he returned a punt for a 68-yard touchdown. He also fumbled a punt that was the turning point in the wild card playoff loss against the Los Angeles Rams.

The next year, he led the team in kickoff returns with a 20.2-yard average, ranked fifth in the NFL in punt return yards (446 yards), tenth in kickoff return yards (666 yards) and tied a team record with 54 punt returns. In 1985, the team tried unsuccessfully to convert him into a wide receiver, and he was released on August 16.

=== Calgary Stampeders ===
In 1986, he signed with the Calgary Stampeders of the Canadian Football League and was named the starter at running back, after being originally listed fifth on the depth chart. He was benched in three games for being late to practices and missing team meetings. He still finished as the league's rushing leader (1,153 yards) and punt returner (768 yards), becoming the first player to be selected to the All-star team in two positions in a single season. He also set franchise records with 768 punt return yards in a season and 155 punt return yards in a game (September 14).

The next year, he led the West Division in rushing yards (857) and again received All-star recognition. His performance fell off in 1988, before being cut after three games with only 100 rushing yards (5.0 yard avg.).

=== Winnipeg Blue Bombers ===
On August 22, 1988, he was signed by the Winnipeg Blue Bombers. He was released on September 8, after playing in three games and registering 53 rushing yards (5.6 yard avg.).

== Personal life and death ==
Allen later coached freshman football at his former Alma Mater Baldwin Park High School. His son, a graduate of Bishop Amat Memorial High School, was a receiver for the University of Hawaii. Allen also worked as an inspector for the San Gabriel Valley County Water District. He was married to Hilda Allen for 33 Years.

Allen died from heart failure in Covina, CA on July 8, 2023, at the age of 63.
