= Alex Green =

American gridiron football player (born 1988)

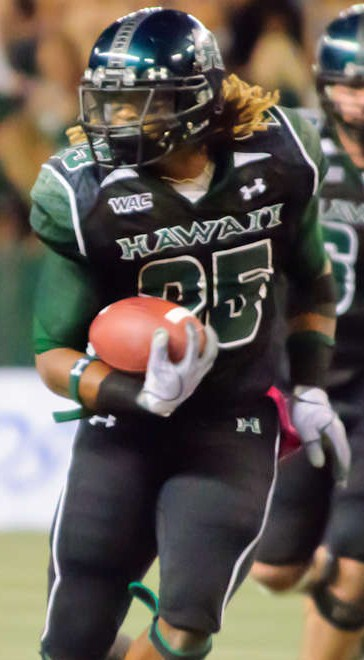
- Green with Hawaii in 2010

No. 20, 25
- Position: Running back

Personal information
- Born: June 23, 1988 (age 38); Portland, Oregon, U.S.
- Listed height: 6 ft 0 in (1.83 m)
- Listed weight: 222 lb (101 kg)

Career information
- High school: Benson Poly (Portland)
- College: Hawaii
- NFL draft: 2011: 3rd round, 96th overall pick

Career history
- Green Bay Packers (2011–2012); New York Jets (2013); Hamilton Tiger-Cats (2017–2018)

Career NFL statistics
- Rushing attempts: 149
- Rushing yards: 510
- Receptions: 21
- Receiving yards: 139
- Stats at Pro Football Reference
- Stats at CFL.ca

Alexander Denell Green (born June 23, 1988) is an American former professional football player who was a running back in the National Football League (NFL) and Canadian Football League (CFL). He played college football for the Hawaii Rainbow Warriors. He was selected by the Green Bay Packers in 2011, and was also a member of the New York Jets of the NFL and the Hamilton Tiger-Cats of the CFL.

== Early life ==
Green attended and played high school football at Benson Polytechnic High School in Portland, Oregon. He graduated in 2006. During his senior season, he rushed for 1,134 yards and 14 touchdowns to earn first-team All-PIL honors.

== College career ==
=== Butte College ===
Green originally went to Butte College in Oroville, California, the same college that future Packers teammate Aaron Rodgers had played for in 2002. In 2008, Green lead the team to a 12–0 record and the junior college national championship. During that time he had 1,037 yards and 14 touchdowns rushing, he also scored two receiving touchdowns.

=== University of Hawaii ===
After two years, Green transferred to the University of Hawaii at Manoa as an incoming junior where he became an integral part of the run and shoot offense for the Hawaii Warriors.

==== 2009 ====
In his first year at Hawaii, Green played in all thirteen games as a running back. He had 453 yards and two touchdowns rushing, as well as 11 receptions for 98 yards and another touchdown. His best game at the season came against Utah State University, where he rushed for 110 yards on 10 carries (11 yards per carry). The Warriors finished the season 6–7.

==== 2010 ====
During his senior year, Green was featured much more in the Warrior offense. Green rushed for 1,199 yards and 18 touchdowns, both of which place second in Hawaii's single-season rushing leaderboards. During the game against New Mexico State, Green broke the school record for rushing in a game with 327 yards on 19 carries (an average of 17 yards per carry). He was named the Western Athletic Conference (WAC) player of the week and Capital One Impact Performer of the week.

== Professional career ==
=== Pre-draft ===
Green was considered one of the better running back prospects coming into the 2011 NFL draft. Scouts stated that Green was "thickly built and well-proportioned", with "competitive speed". However, he was also criticized for his ball-control, lack of power, and the fact that he played in "a pass-happy 'pistol' offense featuring wide splits against porous WAC defenses" and that he "was never asked to handle a heavy workload." He was projected to go as early as the third round.

Pre-draft measurables
Height	Weight	Arm length	Hand span	Wingspan	40-yard dash	10-yard split	20-yard split	20-yard shuttle	Three-cone drill	Vertical jump	Broad jump	Bench press	Wonderlic
6 ft 0 1/4 in (1.84 m)	225 lb (102 kg)	32 in (0.81 m)	9 1/8 in (0.23 m)	6 ft 4 1/4 in (1.94 m)	4.53 s	1.58 s	2.69 s	4.15 s	6.91 s	34 in (0.86 m)	9 ft 6 in (2.90 m)	20 reps	15
All values from NFL Combine

=== Green Bay Packers ===
Green was selected by the Packers in the third round of the 2011 NFL draft, with the 96th overall pick. During the 2011 preseason, Green appeared in three games for the Packers; he rushed for 23 yards in 16 attempts (including a touchdown against the Arizona Cardinals), and had one reception for 25 yards.

Green made his regular season NFL debut in week 1 of the 2011 season against the New Orleans Saints. He received his first carries at running back during garbage time in week 4 against the Denver Broncos; he had three carries for a total of 11 yards. During week 7, Green injured his knee (torn ACL) and missed the rest of the season, an injury that head coach Mike McCarthy called "very unfortunate".

During the 2012 season, Green had 135 rushing attempts for a total of 464 yards (3.4 yards average), and caught 18 passes for a total of 125 yards (6.9 yards average). He did not play in the Packers' final two regular season games or two postseason games, due to aftereffects of his 2011 knee injury.

Green was released by the Packers on August 31, 2013.

=== New York Jets ===
Green was claimed off waivers by the New York Jets on September 1, 2013. During the 2013 season, he appeared in 13 games; he had 11 carries for a total of 35 yards, and 2 receptions for a total of 8 yards. In 2014, Green appeared in all four Jets preseason games, but was released on August 30, during final roster cuts.

=== Hamilton Tiger-Cats ===
In February 2017, Green signed with the Hamilton Tiger-Cats of the CFL. He played in the preseason, was released before the start of the regular season, then rejoined the team following the injury of running back C. J. Gable. Green played in his first CFL game on September 22; in a 24–23 victory over the BC Lions, Green had 13 carries for a total of 140 yards, and 2 receptions for a total of 15 yards. Green played five more games for the Ti-Cats in 2017, rushing for 447 yards and 5 touchdowns. Green earned the starting role for the 2018 season, however he suffered a hand injury just prior to the start of the season, requiring the Ti-Cats to convert defensive lineman Nikita Whitlock to a running back, and to sign John White. Green played very well when he was healthy, but missed 10 games with injury. In eight games he accumulated 604 rushing yards and 7 touchdowns. He also caught 17 passes for 205 yards with one touchdown. Jones and the Ti-Cats agreed to a contract extension on January 30, 2019. Despite being extended, and having great scoring production with 13 touchdowns in 14 regular season games played, Green was released prior to training camp.
