= Davone Bess =

American football player (born 1985)

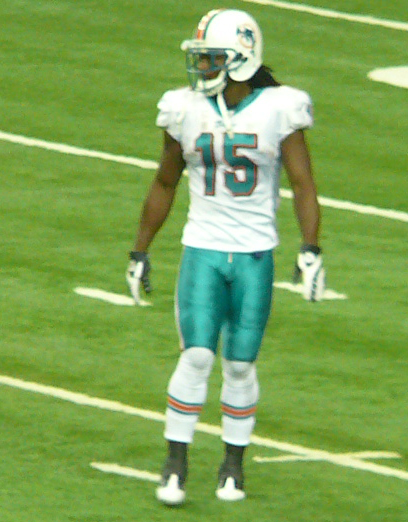
- Bess with the Miami Dolphins in 2009

No. 15
- Position: Wide receiver

Personal information
- Born: September 13, 1985 (age 41); Hayward, California, U.S.
- Listed height: 5 ft 10 in (1.78 m)
- Listed weight: 193 lb (88 kg)

Career information
- High school: Skyline (Oakland, California)
- College: Hawaii (2005–2007)
- NFL draft: 2008: undrafted

Career history
- Miami Dolphins (2008–2012); Cleveland Browns (2013)

Awards and highlights
- Second-team All-American (2007); WAC Freshman of the Year (2005)

Career NFL statistics
- Receptions: 363
- Receiving yards: 3,809
- Receiving touchdowns: 14
- Stats at Pro Football Reference

Davone Atrayo Bess (born September 13, 1985) is an American former professional football player who was a wide receiver in the National Football League (NFL). He was signed by the Miami Dolphins as an undrafted free agent in 2008. He played college football for the Hawaii Rainbow Warriors.

== Early life ==
Bess attended Skyline High School in Oakland, California and was a student and a letter-man in football, basketball, and baseball. In football, he was a first-team All-Citywide receiver as a junior. As a senior, he led his team to the League Championship and was a second-team All-City quarterback. Davone Bess graduated from Skyline High School in 2003.

Bess grew up five minutes away from the Oakland Coliseum as an avid Oakland Raiders fan and even played a high school playoff game for Skyline High at the Coliseum during his senior year. His favorite player was Tim Brown.

Bess has stated that "sports pretty much kept me busy, kept me out of trouble, kept me off the streets." Largely raised by a single mom, Bess was the first person in his family to attend college. Bess' father did not attend high school, but there are other family members on his dad's side that attended high school and graduated from college. Unfortunately, the distance between Bess and his biological dad made him unaware of the achievements of his dad's family; several have college degrees. Bess said of his father: "My dad pretty much wasn't there. If anyone was there it was my brother's dad, but not really because he was a big-time drug dealer. He was in and out of jail himself and going back and forth so he wasn't a reliable source." At the age of 10, Bess witnessed the murder of his uncle at a birthday party.

== College career ==
=== Oregon State University ===
Bess lost his scholarship to Oregon State when he was sentenced to about 21 months in Byron boys ranch juvenile facility after allowing a friend to put stolen items in his car. During his time in the juvenile facility, Bess played in a seven-man flag football team created by the facility. His high school coach contacted Keith Bhonapha, a former player who was a graduate assistant at the University of Hawaii and passed on video of Bess to coach June Jones who then gave Bess an opportunity.

=== University of Hawaii ===
Davone Bess joined Hawaiʻi in 2005 and quickly gained a starting spot at wide receiver.

As a freshman, Bess caught 89 passes for 1,124 yards and 14 touchdowns. Selected WAC first-team and WAC Freshman of the Year.

As a sophomore, caught 96 passes for 1,220 yards and 15 touchdowns. Named WAC first-team.

In his junior year, he finished with 108 catches for 1,266 yards with 12 TDs.

During his time at Hawaii, Bess was named to the Associated Press' 2007 All-America third-team; the Sporting News, Football Writers Association of America, and Rivals.com's 2005 Freshman All-American team; and was named to the All-WAC first-team in 2005, 2006, and 2007. Bess holds Hawaii's school records in receptions and receiving touchdowns, and is third all-time in receiving yards.

== Professional career ==
=== Miami Dolphins ===
Despite being undrafted, Bess earned a spot on the Miami Dolphins active roster during the 2008 NFL season. He managed to catch his first NFL touchdown in Week 7 against the Baltimore Ravens. He worked primarily as a slot receiver until starter Greg Camarillo was injured. Bess assumed starting duties beginning in week 13 against the St. Louis Rams and became a reliable target for quarterback Chad Pennington.

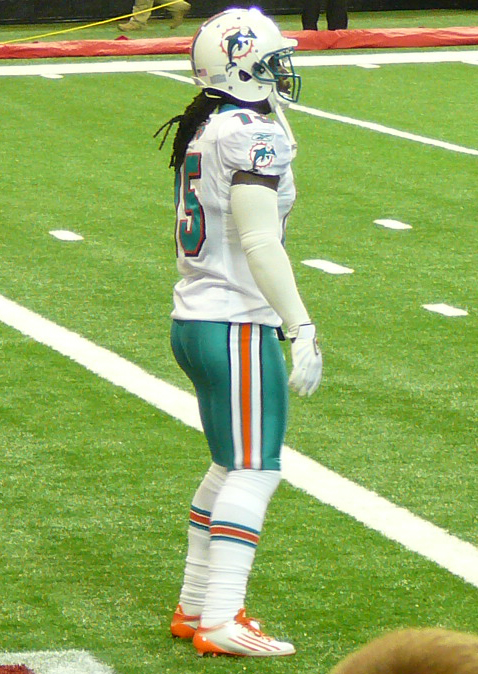
Bess with the Dolphins in 2011

Bess finished the regular season third among NFL rookies in receptions (54) behind two second-rounders—Denver's Eddie Royal (91) and Philadelphia's DeSean Jackson (62). His 54 receptions are the second most in NFL history for an undrafted rookie (behind only Wayne Chrebet, who had 66 catches in 1995).

=== Cleveland Browns ===
Bess was traded to the Cleveland Browns on April 27, 2013, during the 2013 NFL draft. The Browns traded fourth-round and fifth-round selections (#104 and #164 overall) to Miami for Bess and Miami's fourth-round and seventh-round picks (#111 and #217 overall).

In Bess' first season in Cleveland, he recorded 42 receptions for 362 yards—both career lows—and 2 touchdowns, while being credited with nine dropped passes, the second-highest total in the league. On December 21, 2013, with two games to go in the season, Bess was placed on the reserve/non-football illness list with a "personal matter," ending his 2013 campaign. He was released on March 5, 2014.

== Career statistics ==
=== NFL ===
Legend
**Bold**	Career high

==== Regular season ====
Year	Team	Games		Receiving					
Year	Team	GP	GS	Tgt	Rec	Yds	Avg	Lng	TD
2008	MIA	**16**	6	75	54	554	10.3	37	1
2009	MIA	**16**	2	113	76	758	10.0	34	2
2010	MIA	**16**	8	**125**	**79**	**820**	10.4	29	**5**
2011	MIA	**16**	4	86	51	537	10.5	**41**	3
2012	MIA	13	**13**	104	61	778	**12.8**	39	1
2013	CLE	14	3	86	42	362	8.6	20	2
		91	36	589	363	3,809	10.5	41	14

==== Playoffs ====
Year	Team	Games		Receiving					
Year	Team	GP	GS	Tgt	Rec	Yds	Avg	Lng	TD
2008	MIA	**1**	**1**	**5**	**2**	**54**	**27.0**	**45**	0
		1	1	5	2	54	27.0	45	0

=== College ===
			Receiving			
Year	Team	GP	Rec	Yds	Avg	TD
2005	Hawaii	12	89	1,124	12.6	14
2006	Hawaii	14	96	1,220	12.7	15
2007	Hawaii	13	108	1,266	11.7	12
**College totals**		**39**	**293**	**3,610**	**12.3**	**41**

== Personal life ==
Bess was arrested in Florida on January 17, 2014, on charges of assaulting a law enforcement officer at Fort Lauderdale airport. Broward Sheriff’s Office records show Bess was arrested after acting erratically and confronting an officer. The arrest came one day after Bess posted a photo on his Twitter page of a small package containing what appeared to be marijuana. The photo was later deleted. Following the arrest, on January 18, Bess posted yet another photo on Twitter - this time of himself nude standing in front of a mirror. This photo was also later deleted, adding to the list of bizarre behavior in this short timeframe.

On June 20, 2016 in Arizona, Bess was arrested by the Gilbert Police Department for three felony charges of endangerment, felony flight and failure to stop for a police officer. The arrest followed a traffic stop which Bess fled from and then subsequently barricaded himself inside his house. A SWAT team reportedly entered his home after receiving a warrant.

== See also ==
- List of NCAA major college football yearly receiving leaders
- List of NCAA Division I FBS career receiving touchdowns leaders
