= Kealoha Pilares =

American football player (born 1988)

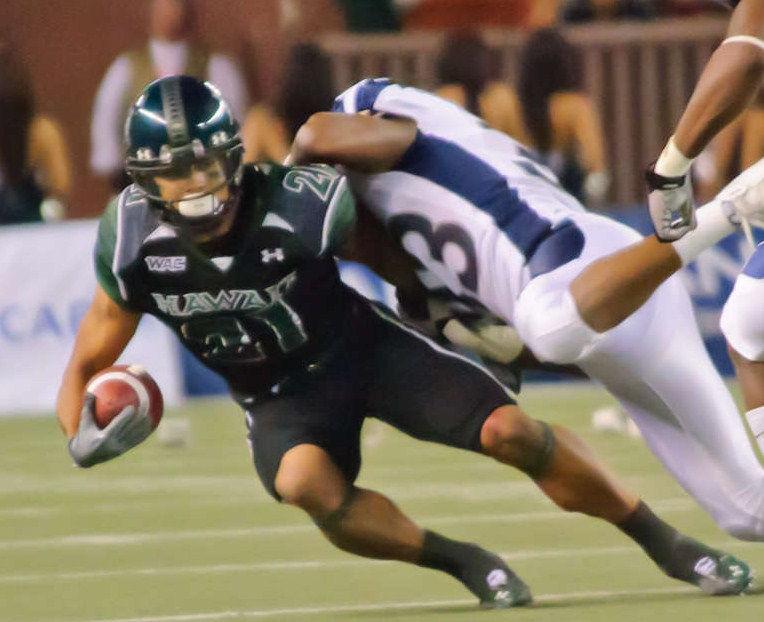
- Pilares with the Hawaii Warriors in 2010

No. 81
- Position: Wide receiver

Personal information
- Born: February 20, 1988 (age 38); Honolulu, Hawaii, U.S.
- Listed height: 5 ft 10 in (1.78 m)
- Listed weight: 205 lb (93 kg)

Career information
- High school: Damien Memorial (Honolulu)
- College: Hawaii
- NFL draft: 2011: 5th round, 132nd overall pick

Career history
- Carolina Panthers (2011–2014); Hamilton Tiger-Cats (2015–2016)

Career NFL statistics
- Receptions: 2
- Receiving yards: 42
- Receiving touchdowns: 1
- Return yards: 806
- Return touchdowns: 1
- Stats at Pro Football Reference

Kealoha Pilares (born February 20, 1988) is an American former professional football player who was a wide receiver in the National Football League (NFL). He was selected by the Carolina Panthers in the fifth round of the 2011 NFL draft. He played college football for the Hawaii Rainbow Warriors.

== Professional career ==
Pre-draft measurables
Height	Weight	Arm length	Hand span	Wingspan	40-yard dash	10-yard split	20-yard split	20-yard shuttle	Three-cone drill	Vertical jump	Broad jump	Bench press
5 ft 9 7/8 in (1.77 m)	199 lb (90 kg)	30 1/2 in (0.77 m)	8 3/4 in (0.22 m)	6 ft 1 in (1.85 m)	4.42 s	1.50 s	2.57 s	4.11 s	6.85 s	40.5 in (1.03 m)	10 ft 5 in (3.18 m)	19 reps
All values from NFL Combine/Pro Day

In the 2011 NFL draft, Pilares was selected in the fifth round, 132nd overall, by the Carolina Panthers. On November 20, 2011, he set a franchise record (since broken) with a 101-yard kick return for a touchdown against the Detroit Lions.

On August 24, 2013, he was placed on injured reserve. He was released on August 24, 2014.

=== NFL statistics ===
Regular season				Receiving					Kickoff returns				
Season	Team	GP	GS	Rec	Yds	Avg	Lng	TD	Ret	Yds	Avg	Lng	TD
2011	Carolina Panthers	12	0	0	0	0.0	0	0	23	590	25.7	101	1
2012	Carolina Panthers	8	0	2	42	21.0	36	1	9	216	24.0	28	0
