= 2006 New Mexico State Aggies football team =

American college football season

2006 New Mexico State Aggies football
- Conference: Western Athletic Conference
- Record: 4–8 (2–6 WAC)
- Head coach: Hal Mumme (2nd season)
- Co-offensive coordinators: Gary Goff (2nd season); Matt Mumme (2nd season)
- Offensive scheme: Air raid
- Defensive coordinator: Woody Widenhofer (2nd season)
- Base defense: 4–3
- Home stadium: Aggie Memorial Stadium

2006 Western Athletic Conference football standings
	Conf.			Overall
Team	W		L	W		L
No. 5 Boise State $	8	–	0	13	–	0
Hawaii	7	–	1	11	–	3
San Jose State	5	–	3	9	–	4
Nevada	5	–	3	8	–	5
Fresno State	4	–	4	4	–	8
Idaho	3	–	5	4	–	8
New Mexico State	2	–	6	4	–	8
Louisiana Tech	1	–	7	3	–	10
Utah State	1	–	7	1	–	11
$ – Conference champion and BCS representative as top non-AQ school to meet automatic qualification criteria; Rankings from AP Poll

The 2006 New Mexico State Aggies football team represented New Mexico State University in the 2006 NCAA Division I FBS football season. The Aggies were coached by head coach Hal Mumme and played their home games at Aggie Memorial Stadium in Las Cruces, New Mexico. They participated as members of the Western Athletic Conference.

== Schedule ==
Date	Time	Opponent	Site	TV	Result	Attendance
August 31	7:00 pm	Southeastern Louisiana*	Aggie Memorial Stadium; Las Cruces, NM		W 30–15	15,561
September 9	6:00 pm	New Mexico*	Aggie Memorial Stadium; Las Cruces, NM (Rio Grande Rivalry)	ESPN Plus	L 28–34	29,095
September 16	6:00 pm	Texas Southern*	Aggie Memorial Stadium; Las Cruces, NM	AV	W 48–14	15,450
September 30	7:05 pm	at UTEP*	Sun Bowl; El Paso, TX (Battle of I-10)		L 38–44	51,500
October 7	3:00 pm	at Idaho	Kibbie Dome; Moscow, ID	AV	L 20–28	15,107
October 15	6:00 pm	No. 19 Boise State	Aggie Memorial Stadium; Las Cruces, NM	ESPN	L 28–40	16,872
October 21	6:00 pm	Hawaii^{†}	Aggie Memorial Stadium; Las Cruces, NM		L 30–49	17,318
October 28	2:05 pm	at Nevada	Mackay Stadium; Reno, NV	AV	L 21–48	11,582
November 4	6:00 pm	San Jose State	Aggie Memorial Stadium; Las Cruces, NM	AV	L 21–31	15,308
November 11	3:00 pm	at Fresno State	Bulldog Stadium; Fresno, CA	AV	L 18–23	33,241
November 25	1:00 pm	at Utah State	Romney Stadium; Logan, UT	AV	W 42–20	7,108
December 2	1:00 pm	Louisiana Tech	Aggie Memorial Stadium; Las Cruces, NM		W 50–23	13,568
*Non-conference game; ^{†}Homecoming; Rankings from AP Poll released prior to the game; All times are in Mountain time

== Game summaries ==
=== Southeastern Louisiana ===
	1	2	3	4	Total
Lions	12	3	0	0	15
Aggies	14	9	7	0	30

Team	Category	Player	Statistics
Southeastern Louisiana	Passing	Seth Babin	17/28, 130 yards, TD, INT
Southeastern Louisiana	Rushing	Jay Lucas	17 rushes, 96 yards, TD
Southeastern Louisiana	Receiving	Byron Ross	5 receptions, 35 yards
New Mexico State	Passing	Chase Holbrook	29/40, 381 yards, 2 TD
New Mexico State	Rushing	Justine Buries	22 rushes, 107 yards, TD
New Mexico State	Receiving	Chris Williams	7 receptions, 146 yards, TD

=== New Mexico ===
	1	2	3	4	Total
Lobos	7	17	0	10	34
Aggies	7	7	0	14	28

Team	Category	Player	Statistics
New Mexico	Passing	Chris Nelson	11/26, 283 yards, 3 TD
New Mexico	Rushing	Rodney Ferguson	12 rushes, 77 yards
New Mexico	Receiving	Marcus Smith	5 receptions, 179 yards, 3 TD
New Mexico State	Passing	Chase Holbrook	37/56, 472 yards, 4 TD, INT
New Mexico State	Rushing	Justine Buries	11 rushes, 26 yards
New Mexico State	Receiving	Derek Dubois	7 receptions, 104 yards, TD

=== Texas Southern ===
	1	2	3	4	Total
Tigers	0	7	0	7	14
Aggies	7	14	14	13	48

Team	Category	Player	Statistics
Texas Southern	Passing	Cornelius Harmon	10/21, 105 yards, TD, INT
Texas Southern	Rushing	Brent Wilson	11 rushes, 37 yards
Texas Southern	Receiving	Brian Haith	2 receptions, 35 yards
New Mexico State	Passing	Chase Holbrook	28/43, 352 yards, 3 TD, INT
New Mexico State	Rushing	Jeremiah Williams	14 rushes, 101 yards, TD
New Mexico State	Receiving	Nick Cleaver	5 receptions, 100 yards, TD

=== At UTEP ===
	1	2	3	4	Total
Aggies	0	20	11	7	38
Miners	17	14	0	13	44

Team	Category	Player	Statistics
New Mexico State	Passing	Chase Holbrook	48/73, 506 yards, 4 TD, INT
New Mexico State	Rushing	Jeremiah Williams	15 rushes, 90 yards
New Mexico State	Receiving	A. J. Harris	10 receptions, 129 yards, TD
UTEP	Passing	Jordan Palmer	18/26, 414 yards, 3 TD, 2 INT
UTEP	Rushing	Marcus Thomas	18 rushes, 81 yards, TD
UTEP	Receiving	Johnnie Lee Higgins	7 receptions, 223 yards, 3 TD

=== At Idaho ===
	1	2	3	4	Total
Aggies	7	6	0	7	20
Vandals	7	21	0	0	28

Team	Category	Player	Statistics
New Mexico State	Passing	Chase Holbrook	24/41, 307 yards, 3 TD, 2 INT
New Mexico State	Rushing	Jeremiah Williams	8 rushes, 19 yards
New Mexico State	Receiving	Chris Williams	4 receptions, 111 yards, TD
Idaho	Passing	Steven Wichman	19/27, 298 yards, 2 TD, INT
Idaho	Rushing	Brian Flowers	19 rushes, 91 yards, 2 TD
Idaho	Receiving	Luke Smith-Anderson	5 receptions, 87 yards

=== No. 19 Boise State ===
	1	2	3	4	Total
No. 19 Broncos	21	6	6	7	40
Aggies	0	14	7	7	28

Team	Category	Player	Statistics
Boise State	Passing	Jared Zabransky	14/21, 215 yards, 2 TD, INT
Boise State	Rushing	Ian Johnson	27 rushes, 192 yards, 4 TD
Boise State	Receiving	Jerard Rabb	3 receptions, 59 yards
New Mexico State	Passing	Chase Holbrook	50/66, 529 yards, 2 TD, 2 INT
New Mexico State	Rushing	Jeremiah Williams	8 rushes, 15 yards, TD
New Mexico State	Receiving	Chris Williams	13 receptions, 191 yards, TD

=== Hawaii ===
	1	2	3	4	Total
Warriors	14	14	0	21	49
Aggies	14	3	7	6	30

Team	Category	Player	Statistics
Hawaii	Passing	Colt Brennan	22/31, 330 yards, 5 TD
Hawaii	Rushing	Nate Ilaoa	18 rushes, 94 yards, TD
Hawaii	Receiving	Ross Dickerson	6 receptions, 125 yards, 2 TD
New Mexico State	Passing	Chase Holbrook	31/45, 323 yards, 3 TD, INT
New Mexico State	Rushing	Chris Nwoko	12 rushes, 59 yards, TD
New Mexico State	Receiving	Chris Williams	7 receptions, 160 yards, 2 TD

=== At Nevada ===
	1	2	3	4	Total
Aggies	7	0	7	7	21
Wolf Pack	0	28	14	6	48

Team	Category	Player	Statistics
New Mexico State	Passing	Chase Holbrook	19/28, 217 yards, TD, INT
New Mexico State	Rushing	Jeremiah Williams	6 rushes, 34 yards
New Mexico State	Receiving	Chris Williams	8 receptions, 90 yards
Nevada	Passing	Jeff Rowe	10/16, 125 yards, TD, 2 INT
Nevada	Rushing	Robert Hubbard	28 rushes, 114 yards, TD
Nevada	Receiving	Arthur King Jr.	5 receptions, 65 yards

=== San Jose State ===
	1	2	3	4	Total
Spartans	8	7	0	16	31
Aggies	14	7	0	0	21

Team	Category	Player	Statistics
San Jose State	Passing	Adam Tafralis	9/16, 105 yards, TD
San Jose State	Rushing	Yonus Davis	25 rushes, 177 yards, TD
San Jose State	Receiving	John Broussard	3 receptions, 45 yards
New Mexico State	Passing	Chase Holbrook	34/49, 364 yards, 3 TD
New Mexico State	Rushing	Tonny Glynn	14 rushes, 66 yards
New Mexico State	Receiving	Nick Cleaver	7 receptions, 124 yards, TD

=== At Fresno State ===
	1	2	3	4	Total
Aggies	0	12	6	0	18
Bulldogs	7	3	6	7	23

Team	Category	Player	Statistics
New Mexico State	Passing	Chase Holbrook	39/51, 367 yards, 2 TD
New Mexico State	Rushing	Jeremiah Williams	6 rushes, 29 yards
New Mexico State	Receiving	Chris Williams	8 receptions, 121 yards, TD
Fresno State	Passing	Tom Brandstater	11/19, 99 yards, TD
Fresno State	Rushing	Dwayne Wright	26 rushes, 121 yards, 2 TD
Fresno State	Receiving	Bear Pascoe	2 receptions, 35 yards

=== At Utah State ===
	1	2	3	4	Total
NMSU Aggies	28	7	0	7	42
USU Aggies	0	12	8	0	20

Team	Category	Player	Statistics
New Mexico State	Passing	Chase Holbrook	16/20, 287 yards, 4 TD
New Mexico State	Rushing	David Romaka	14 rushes, 66 yards
New Mexico State	Receiving	Chris Williams	7 receptions, 161 yards, 3 TD
Utah State	Passing	Leon Jackson III	12/25, 146 yards, 2 TD
Utah State	Rushing	Leon Jackson III	8 rushes, 48 yards
Utah State	Receiving	Kevin Robinson	4 receptions, 101 yards, TD

=== Louisiana Tech ===
	1	2	3	4	Total
Bulldogs	7	0	0	16	23
Aggies	7	7	17	19	50

Team	Category	Player	Statistics
Louisiana Tech	Passing	Zac Champion	13/29, 163 yards, 3 INT
Louisiana Tech	Rushing	Patrick Jackson	23 rushes, 136 yards, TD
Louisiana Tech	Receiving	Eric Newman	5 receptions, 86 yards
New Mexico State	Passing	Chase Holbrook	42/55, 514 yards, 3 TD
New Mexico State	Rushing	David Romaka	9 rushes, 58 yards, 2 TD
New Mexico State	Receiving	Chris Williams	12 receptions, 140 yards
