= 2006 Nevada Wolf Pack football team =

American college football season

2006 Nevada Wolf Pack football
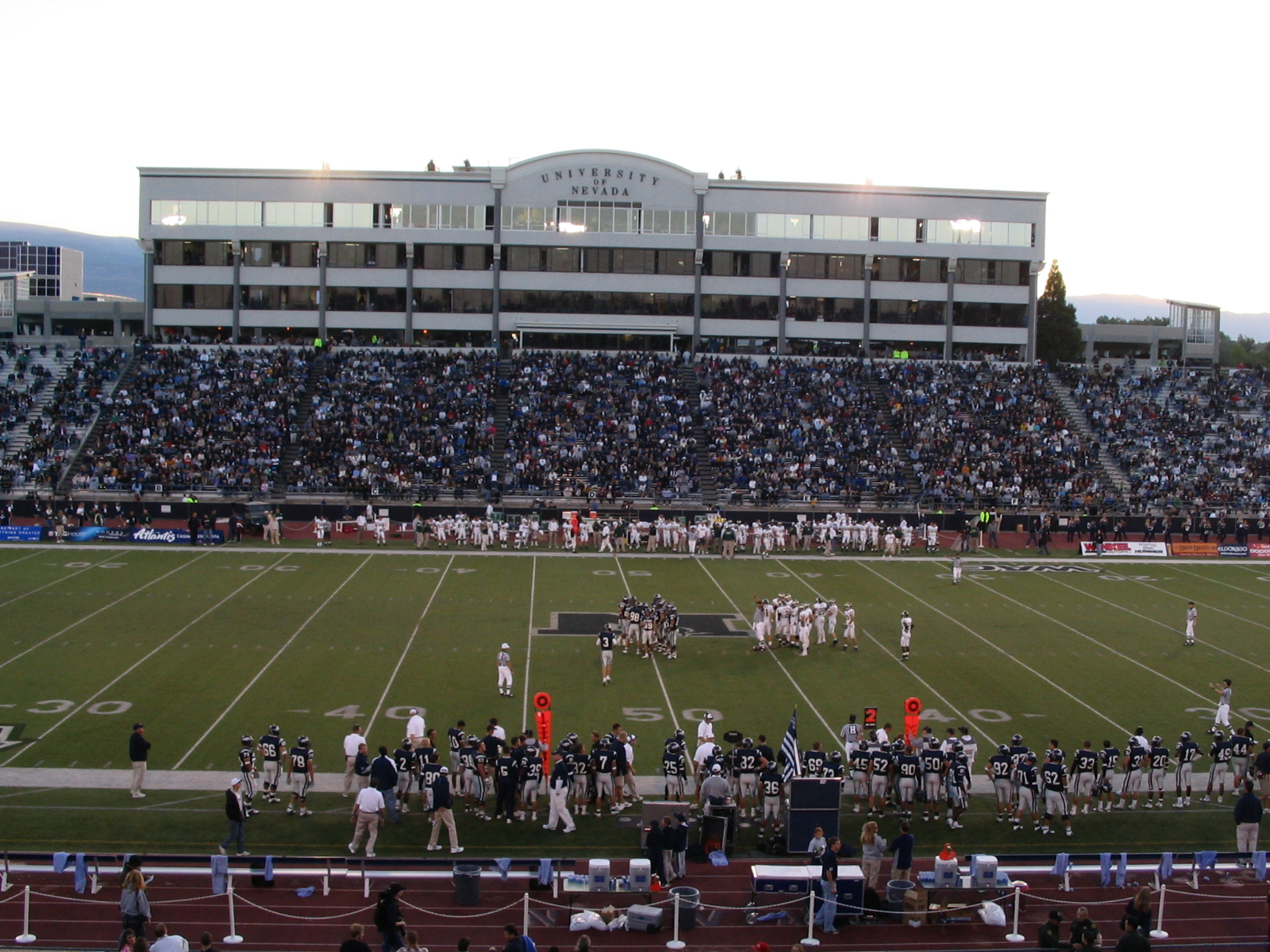
- Nevada on the field vs. Colorado State on September 16 at Mackay Stadium

MPC Computers Bowl, L 20–21 vs. Miami (FL)
- Conference: Western Athletic Conference
- Record: 8–5 (5–3 WAC)
- Head coach: Chris Ault (22nd season)
- Offensive coordinator: Chris Klenakis (6th season)
- Offensive scheme: Pistol
- Co-defensive coordinators: Tim DeRuyter (2nd season); Barry Sacks (3rd season)
- Base defense: 3–4
- Home stadium: Mackay Stadium

2006 Western Athletic Conference football standings
	Conf.			Overall
Team	W		L	W		L
No. 5 Boise State $	8	–	0	13	–	0
Hawaii	7	–	1	11	–	3
San Jose State	5	–	3	9	–	4
Nevada	5	–	3	8	–	5
Fresno State	4	–	4	4	–	8
Idaho	3	–	5	4	–	8
New Mexico State	2	–	6	4	–	8
Louisiana Tech	1	–	7	3	–	10
Utah State	1	–	7	1	–	11
$ – Conference champion and BCS representative as top non-AQ school to meet automatic qualification criteria; Rankings from AP Poll

The 2006 Nevada Wolf Pack football team represented the University of Nevada, Reno during the 2006 NCAA Division I FBS football season. Nevada competed as a member of the Western Athletic Conference (WAC). The Wolf Pack were led by Chris Ault in his 22nd overall and 3rd straight season since taking over as head coach for the third time in 2004. They played their home games at Mackay Stadium.

== Schedule ==
Date	Time	Opponent	Site	TV	Result	Attendance
September 1	5:00 p.m.	at Fresno State	Bulldog Stadium; Fresno, CA	ESPN	L 19–28	39,269
September 9	7:00 p.m.	at No. 25 Arizona State*	Sun Devil Stadium; Tempe, AZ	KREN-TV/FSNAZ	L 21–52	54,232
September 16	6:00 p.m.	Colorado State*	Mackay Stadium; Reno, NV	WSN	W 28–10	18,883
September 22	5:00 p.m.	Northwestern*	Mackay Stadium; Reno, NV	ESPN2	W 31–21	16,176
September 30	7:00 p.m.	at UNLV*	Sam Boyd Stadium; Whitney, NV (Fremont Cannon)	MWSN	W 31–3	37,179
October 7	9:00 p.m.	at Hawaii	Aloha Stadium; Halawa, HI	KREN-TV/Oceanic PPV	L 34–41	33,761
October 21	4:00 p.m.	San Jose State^{†}	Mackay Stadium; Reno, NV	ABC	W 23–7	19,636
October 28	1:00 p.m.	New Mexico State	Mackay Stadium; Reno, NV		W 48–21	11,582
November 4	2:00 p.m.	at Idaho	Kibbie Dome; Moscow, ID	KREN-TV	W 45–7	15,013
November 11	1:00 p.m.	Utah State	Mackay Stadium; Reno, NV		W 42–0	8,584
November 18	5:00 p.m.	at Louisiana Tech	Joe Aillet Stadium; Ruston, LA	WSN	W 42–0	9,383
November 25	1:00 p.m.	No. 12 Boise State	Mackay Stadium; Reno, NV (rivalry)	ESPN2	L 7–38	25,506
December 31	4:30 p.m.	vs. Miami (FL)*	Bronco Stadium; Boise, ID (MPC Computers Bowl)	ESPN	L 20–21	28,654
*Non-conference game; ^{†}Homecoming; Rankings from AP Poll released prior to the game; All times are in Pacific time

== Game summaries ==
=== At Fresno State ===
Nevada at Fresno State

Team	1	2	3	4	Total
Wolf Pack	0	6	6	7	19
• Bulldogs	7	7	7	7	28

- Date: September 1, 2006
- Location: Bulldog Stadium
  Fresno, CA
- Game start: 5:00 p.m. PDT
- Elapsed time: 3 hours and 1 minute
- Game attendance: 39,269
- Game weather: Temperature: 100 °F (38 °C) • Weather: Sunny and Hot • Wind: N 5 MPH
- Referee: Bill Athan
- TV announcers (ESPN): Bob Wischusen, Rod Gilmore, Trevor Matich and Rob Simmelkjaer (sideline)

Scoring summary
1	04:54	FS	Joe Fernandez 6–yard pass from Tom Brandstater (Clint Stitser kick)	FS 7–0
2	07:17	FS	Dwayne Wright 1–yard run (Clint Stitser kick)	FS 14–0
2	00:37	NEV	Mike McCoy 23–yard pass from Jeff Rowe (Brett Jaekle kick blocked)	FS 14–6
3	12:58	FS	Dwayne Wright 40–yard run (Clint Stitser kick)	FS 21–6
3	05:24	NEV	Mike McCoy 21–yard pass from Jeff Rowe (Brett Jaekle kick)	FS 21–13
4	14:15	NEV	Luke Lippincott 1–yard run (Brett Jaekle kick)	FS 21–19
4	06:55	FS	Dwayne Wright 9–yard run (Clint Stitser kick)	FS 28–19

=== At Arizona State ===
Nevada at Arizona State

Team	1	2	3	4	Total
Wolf Pack	0	14	0	7	21
• Sun Devils	7	24	14	7	52

- Date: September 9, 2006
- Location: Sun Devil Stadium
  Tempe, AZ
- Game start: 7:07 p.m. PDT
- Elapsed time: 3 hours and 3 minutes
- Game attendance: 54,232
- Game weather: Temperature: 84 °F (29 °C) • Weather: Clear • Wind: W 7 MPH
- Referee: Brian O'Cain
- TV announcers (KREN-TV/FSNAZ): Dan Gustin and Chris Vargas of KREN-TV and N/A of FSNAZ

Scoring summary
1	09:21	ASU	Zach Miller 2–yard pass from Rudy Carpenter (Jesse Ainsworth kick)	ASU 7–0
2	13:54	NEV	Ezra Butler 23–yard interception (Brett Jaekle kick)	TIE 7–7
2	09:58	ASU	Michael Jones 20–yard pass from Rudy Carpenter (Jesse Ainsworth kick)	ASU 14–7
2	06:04	ASU	Jesse Ainsworth 32–yard field goal	ASU 17–7
2	02:44	ASU	Nate Kimbrough 52–yard pass from Rudy Carpenter (Jesse Ainsworth kick)	ASU 24–7
2	02:13	ASU	Ryan McFoy 30–yard interception (Jesse Ainsworth kick)	ASU 31–7
2	00:14	NEV	Marko Mitchell 9–yard pass from Jeff Rowe (Brett Jaekle kick)	ASU 31–14
3	12:26	ASU	Shaun DeWitty 22–yard pass from Rudy Carpenter (Jesse Ainsworth kick)	ASU 38–14
3	06:16	ASU	Terry Richardson 25–yard pass from Rudy Carpenter (Jesse Ainsworth kick)	ASU 45–14
4	05:17	NEV	Adam Bishop 7–yard pass from Travis Moore (Brett Jaekle kick)	ASU 45–21
4	02:55	ASU	Ryan Torain 15–yard run (Jesse Ainsworth kick)	ASU 52–21

=== Colorado State ===
Colorado State at Nevada

Team	1	2	3	4	Total
Rams	0	10	0	0	10
• Wolf Pack	7	14	0	7	28

- Date: September 16, 2006
- Location: Mackay Stadium
  Reno, NV
- Game start: 6:05 p.m. PDT
- Elapsed time: 2 hours and 25 minutes
- Game attendance: 18,883
- Game weather: N/A
- Referee: Karl Richins
- TV announcers (WSN): N/A

Scoring summary
1	07:48	NEV	Robert Hubbard 1–yard run (Brett Jaekle kick)	NEV 7–0
2	14:54	NEV	Luke Lippincott 2–yard run (Brett Jaekle kick)	NEV 14–0
2	07:51	CSU	Jason Smith 36–yard field goal	NEV 14–3
2	05:10	CSU	Sedric Patterson 0–yard blocked punt return (Jason Smith kick)	NEV 14–10
2	00:51	NEV	Mike McCoy 39–yard pass from Jeff Rowe (Brett Jaekle kick)	NEV 21–10
4	12:38	NEV	Brandon Fragger 11–yard pass from Jeff Rowe (Brett Jaekle kick)	NEV 28–10

=== Northwestern ===
Northwestern at Nevada

Team	1	2	3	4	Total
Wildcats	7	7	0	7	21
• Wolf Pack	17	7	0	7	31

- Date: September 22, 2006
- Location: Mackay Stadium
  Reno, NV
- Game start: 5:06 p.m. PDT
- Elapsed time: 3 hours and 14 minutes
- Game attendance: 16,176
- Game weather: Temperature: 62 °F (17 °C) • Weather: Clear • Wind: 5–10 MPH
- Referee: Stephen Pamon
- TV announcers (ESPN2): Dave Pasch, Rod Gilmore, Trevor Matich and Heather Cox (sideline)

Scoring summary
1	11:44	NU	Tyrell Sutton 3–yard run (Joel Howells kick)	NU 7–0
1	05:28	NEV	Robert Hubbard 25–yard pass from Jeff Rowe (Brett Jaekle kick)	TIE 7–7
1	02:33	NEV	Brett Jaekle 32–yard field goal	NEV 10–7
1	01:02	NEV	Robert Hubbard 3–yard run (Brett Jaekle kick)	NEV 17–7
2	12:51	NU	Terrell Jordan 2–yard run (Joel Howells kick)	NEV 17–14
2	09:25	NEV	Mike McCoy 26–yard pass from Jeff Rowe (Brett Jaekle kick)	NEV 24–14
4	13:49	NU	Mike Kafka 13–yard run (Joel Howells kick)	NEV 24–21
4	02:14	NEV	Joe Garcia 24–yard interception (Brett Jaekle kick)	NEV 31–21

=== At UNLV ===
Nevada at UNLV
(Battle for the Fremont Cannon)

Team	1	2	3	4	Total
• Wolf Pack	7	10	7	7	31
Rebels	0	0	0	3	3

- Date: September 30, 2006
- Location: Sam Boyd Stadium
  Whitney, NV
- Game start: 7:06 p.m. PDT
- Elapsed time: 2 hours and 50 minutes
- Game attendance: 37,179
- Game weather: Temperature: 90 °F (32 °C) • Weather: Clear • Wind: S 7 MPH
- Referee: Daniel Romeo
- TV announcers (MWSN): Rich Cellini, Jon Berger and Anne Marie Anderson (sideline)

Scoring summary
1	11:14	NEV	Mike McCoy 79–yard pass from Jeff Rowe (Brett Jaekle kick)	NEV 7–0
2	12:01	NEV	Brett Jaekle 36–yard field goal	NEV 10–0
2	01:36	NEV	Brandon Fragger 5–yard run (Brett Jaekle kick)	NEV 17–0
3	13:59	NEV	Brandon Fragger 66–yard run (Brett Jaekle kick)	NEV 24–0
4	13:04	NEV	Kyle Eklund 2–yard run (Brett Jaekle kick)	NEV 31–0
4	04:49	UNLV	Sergio Aguayo 21–yard field goal	NEV 31–3

=== At Hawaii ===
Nevada at Hawaii

Team	1	2	3	4	Total
Wolf Pack	7	14	0	13	34
• Warriors	10	21	3	7	41

- Date: October 7, 2006
- Location: Aloha Stadium
  Halawa, HI
- Game start: 6:07 p.m.
- Elapsed time: 3 hours and 30 minutes
- Game attendance: 33,761
- Game weather: Temperature: 81 °F (27 °C) • Weather: Partly Cloudy • Wind: SE 14 MPH
- Referee: Frank White
- TV announcers (KREN-TV/Oceanic PPV): Dan Gustin and Chris Vargas of KREN-TV and Jim Leahey, Jim Donovan and Russell Yamanoha of Oceanic PPV

Scoring summary
1	10:38	UH	Dan Kelly 35–yard field goal	UH 3–0
1	06:36	NEV	Jack Darlington 19–yard pass from Jeff Rowe (Brett Jaekle kick)	NEV 7–3
1	01:10	UH	Ian Sample 17–yard pass from Colt Brennan (Dan Kelly kick)	UH 10–7
2	14:19	UH	Ian Sample 63–yard pass from Colt Brennan (Dan Kelly kick)	UH 17–7
2	08:29	UH	Davone Bess 9–yard pass from Colt Brennan (Dan Kelly kick)	UH 24–7
2	05:44	NEV	Brandon Fragger 3–yard run (Brett Jaekle kick)	UH 24–14
2	01:48	UH	Ross Dickerson 3–yard pass from Colt Brennan (Dan Kelly kick)	UH 31–14
2	00:10	NEV	Mike McCoy 3–yard pass from Jeff Rowe (Brett Jaekle kick)	UH 31–21
3	07:49	UH	Dan Kelly 25–yard field goal	UH 34–21
4	11:45	UH	Colt Brennan 6–yard run (Dan Kelly kick)	UH 41–21
4	09:08	NEV	Anthony Pudewell 13–yard pass from Travis Moore (Brett Jaekle kick)	UH 41–28
4	03:57	NEV	Anthony Pudewell 5–yard pass from Travis Moore (Brett Jaekle kick failed)	UH 41–34

=== San Jose State ===
San Jose State at Nevada

Team	1	2	3	4	Total
Spartans	0	7	0	0	7
• Wolf Pack	7	3	7	6	23

- Date: October 21, 2006
- Location: Mackay Stadium
  Reno, NV
- Game start: 4:06 p.m. PDT
- Elapsed time: 3 hours and 22 minutes
- Game attendance: 19,636
- Game weather: N/A
- Referee: Paul Labenne
- TV announcers (ABC): Dan Fouts, Tim Brant and Jack Arute (sideline)

Scoring summary
1	04:46	NEV	Robert Hubbard 1–yard run (Brett Jaekle kick)	NEV 7–0
2	12:03	NEV	Brett Jaekle 27–yard field goal	NEV 10–0
2	00:10	SJSU	James Jones 13–yard pass from Adam Tafralis (Jared Strubeck kick)	NEV 10–7
3	13:33	NEV	Travis Moore 1–yard run (Brett Jaekle kick)	NEV 17–7
4	03:33	NEV	Mike McCoy 2–yard pass from Travis Moore (Brett Jaekle kick failed)	NEV 23–7

=== New Mexico State ===
New Mexico State at Nevada

Team	1	2	3	4	Total
Aggies	7	0	7	7	21
• Wolf Pack	0	28	14	6	48

- Date: October 28, 2006
- Location: Mackay Stadium
  Reno, NV
- Game start: 1:07 p.m. PDT
- Elapsed time: 3 hours and 17 minutes
- Game attendance: 11,582
- Game weather: Temperature: 67 °F (19 °C) • Weather: Clear • Wind: E 5–10 MPH
- Referee: Bill McCabe
- TV announcers (None): None

Scoring summary
1	05:22	NMSU	A.J. Harris 67–yard pass from Chase Holbrook (Ryan Bowling kick)	NMSU 7–0
2	09:18	NEV	Jeff Rowe 6–yard run (Brett Jaekle kick)	TIE 7–7
2	08:15	NEV	Jeremy Engstrom 19–yard fumble recovery (Brett Jaekle kick)	NEV 14–7
2	04:32	NEV	Caleb Spencer 6–yard run (Brett Jaekle kick)	NEV 21–7
2	00:03	NEV	Mike McCoy 8–yard pass from Jeff Rowe (Brett Jaekle kick)	NEV 28–7
3	08:24	NEV	Caleb Spencer 9–yard pass from Travis Moore (Brett Jaekle kick)	NEV 35–7
3	06:11	NMSU	Tim McManigal 60–yard interception (Ryan Bowling kick)	NEV 35–14
3	02:26	NEV	Mike McCoy 16–yard pass from Nick Graziano (Brett Jaekle kick)	NEV 42–14
4	05:29	NMSU	Chris Nwoko 3–yard run (Ryan Bowling kick)	NEV 42–21
4	02:40	NEV	Robert Hubbard 2–yard run (Brett Jaekle kick failed)	NEV 48–21

=== At Idaho ===
Nevada at Idaho

Team	1	2	3	4	Total
• Wolf Pack	14	17	7	7	45
Vandals	0	0	7	0	7

- Date: November 4, 2006
- Location: Kibbie Dome
  Moscow, ID
- Game start: 2:07 p.m. PST
- Elapsed time: 2 hours and 53 minutes
- Game attendance: 15,013
- Game weather: Indoors
- Referee: Frank White
- TV announcers (KREN-TV): Dan Gustin and Chris Vargas

Scoring summary
1	08:27	NEV	Travis Branzell 2–yard pass from Jeff Rowe (Brett Jaekle kick)	NEV 7–0
1	01:35	NEV	Caleb Spencer 34–yard pass from Jeff Rowe (Brett Jaekle kick)	NEV 14–0
2	07:31	NEV	Marko Mitchell 30–yard pass from Jeff Rowe (Brett Jaekle kick)	NEV 21–0
2	03:58	NEV	Jeff Rowe 1–yard run (Brett Jaekle kick)	NEV 28–0
2	00:00	NEV	Brett Jaekle 19–yard field goal	NEV 31–0
3	07:40	Idaho	Jayson Bird 1–yard run (Tino Amancio kick)	NEV 31–7
3	01:36	NEV	Luke Lippincott 1–yard run (Brett Jaekle kick)	NEV 38–7
4	11:34	NEV	Luke Lippincott 1–yard run (Brett Jaekle kick)	NEV 45–7

=== Utah State ===
Utah State at Nevada

Team	1	2	3	4	Total
Aggies	0	0	0	0	0
• Wolf Pack	7	7	21	7	42

- Date: November 11, 2006
- Location: Mackay Stadium
  Reno, NV
- Game start: 1:05 p.m. PST
- Elapsed time: 2 hours and 35 minutes
- Game attendance: 8,584
- Game weather: Temperature: 46 °F (8 °C) • Weather: Rain and Snow showers • Wind: N 5–10 MPH
- Referee: Daniel Romeo
- TV announcers (None): None

Scoring summary
1	13:40	NEV	Robert Hubbard 4–yard pass from Jeff Rowe (Brett Jaekle kick)	NEV 7–0
2	03:20	NEV	Luke Lippincott 5–yard run (Brett Jaekle kick)	NEV 14–0
3	09:45	NEV	Luke Lippincott 1–yard run (Brett Jaekle kick)	NEV 21–0
3	05:26	NEV	Jeff Rowe 18–yard run (Brett Jaekle kick)	NEV 28–0
3	00:19	NEV	Jeff Rowe 6–yard run (Brett Jaekle kick)	NEV 35–0
4	11:41	NEV	Mike Kanellis 1–yard run (Brett Jaekle kick)	NEV 42–0

=== At Louisiana Tech ===
Nevada at Louisiana Tech

Team	1	2	3	4	Total
• Wolf Pack	14	21	0	7	42
Bulldogs	0	0	0	0	0

- Date: November 18, 2006
- Location: Joe Aillet Stadium
  Ruston, LA
- Game start: 7:00 p.m. CST
- Elapsed time: 2 hours and 48 minutes
- Game attendance: 9,383
- Game weather: Temperature: 60 °F (16 °C) • Weather: Clear • Wind: Calm
- Referee: Bill McCabe
- TV announcers (WSN): N/A

Scoring summary
1	06:16	NEV	Luke Lippincott 4–yard run (Brett Jaekle kick)	NEV 7–0
1	02:15	NEV	Robert Hubbard 1–yard run (Brett Jaekle kick)	NEV 14–0
2	12:27	NEV	Marko Mitchell 5–yard pass from Jeff Rowe (Brett Jaekle kick)	NEV 21–0
2	05:20	NEV	Robert Hubbard 23–yard run (Brett Jaekle kick)	NEV 28–0
2	03:28	NEV	Luke Lippincott 23–yard run (Brett Jaekle kick)	NEV 35–0
4	13:46	NEV	Luke Lippincott 1–yard run (Brett Jaekle kick)	NEV 42–0

=== Boise State ===
Boise State at Nevada
(rivalry)

Team	1	2	3	4	Total
• No. 12 Broncos	3	14	14	7	38
Wolf Pack	0	0	7	0	7

- Date: November 25, 2006
- Location: Mackay Stadium
  Reno, NV
- Game start: 1:15 p.m. PST
- Elapsed time: 3 hours and 3 minutes
- Game attendance: 25,506
- Game weather: Temperature: 46 °F (8 °C) • Weather: Clear and Sunny • Wind: E 10 MPH
- Referee: Frank White
- TV announcers (ESPN2): Ron Franklin, Ed Cunningham and Jerry Punch (sideline)

Scoring summary
1	02:59	BSU	Anthony Montgomery 28–yard field goal	BSU 3–0
2	12:03	BSU	Ian Johnson 6–yard run (Anthony Montgomery kick)	BSU 10–0
2	08:34	BSU	Ian Johnson 4–yard run (Anthony Montgomery kick)	BSU 17–0
3	10:13	BSU	Vinny Perretta 5–yard run (Anthony Montgomery kick)	BSU 24–0
3	06:18	BSU	Legedu Naanee 45–yard pass from Jared Zabransky (Anthony Montgomery kick)	BSU 31–0
3	02:52	NEV	Nick Hawthrone 45–yard interception (Brett Jaekle kick)	BSU 31–7
4	06:41	BSU	Ian Johnson 3–yard run (Anthony Montgomery kick)	BSU 38–7

=== Vs. Miami (FL) ===
Nevada vs. Miami (FL)
(MPC Computers Bowl)

Team	1	2	3	4	Total
• Hurricanes	7	7	7	0	21
Wolf Pack	2	9	3	6	20

- Date: December 31, 2006
- Location: Bronco Stadium
  Boise, ID
- Game start: 5:37 p.m. MST
- Elapsed time: 3 hours and 26 minutes
- Game attendance: 28,654
- Game weather: Temperature: 31 °F (−1 °C) • Weather: Mostly Cloudy • Wind: NW 8 MPH
- Referee: Randy Smith
- TV announcers (ESPN): Mark Jones and David Norrie

Scoring summary
1	04:20	UM	Kirby Freeman 1–yard run (Jon Peattie kick)	UM 7–0
1	00:05	NEV	Team -11–yard safety	UM 7–2
2	03:38	NEV	Marko Mitchell 27–yard pass from Jeff Rowe (rush failed)	NEV 8–7
2	01:46	UM	Ryan Moore 52–yard pass from Kirby Freeman (Jon Peattie kick)	UM 14–8
2	00:05	NEV	Brett Jaekle 33–yard field goal	UM 14–11
3	06:22	NEV	Brett Jaekle 31–yard field goal	TIE 14–14
3	05:59	UM	Sam Shields 78–yard pass from Kirby Freeman (Jon Peattie kick)	UM 21–14
4	14:05	NEV	Brett Jaekle 44–yard field goal	UM 21–17
4	09:25	NEV	Brett Jaekle 40–yard field goal	UM 21–20
