= 2006 Boise State Broncos football team =

American college football season

2006 Boise State Broncos football

WAC champion Fiesta Bowl champion

Fiesta Bowl, W 43–42 ^{OT} vs. Oklahoma
- Conference: Western Athletic Conference

Ranking
- Coaches: No. 6
- AP: No. 5
- Record: 13–0 (8–0 WAC)
- Head coach: Chris Petersen (1st season)
- Offensive coordinator: Bryan Harsin (1st season)
- Offensive scheme: Multiple
- Defensive coordinator: Justin Wilcox (1st season)
- Base defense: 4–3
- Home stadium: Bronco Stadium

2006 Western Athletic Conference football standings
	Conf.			Overall
Team	W		L	W		L
No. 5 Boise State $	8	–	0	13	–	0
Hawaii	7	–	1	11	–	3
San Jose State	5	–	3	9	–	4
Nevada	5	–	3	8	–	5
Fresno State	4	–	4	4	–	8
Idaho	3	–	5	4	–	8
New Mexico State	2	–	6	4	–	8
Louisiana Tech	1	–	7	3	–	10
Utah State	1	–	7	1	–	11
$ – Conference champion and BCS representative as top non-AQ school to meet automatic qualification criteria; Rankings from AP Poll

The 2006 Boise State Broncos football team represented Boise State University in the 2006 NCAA Division I FBS football season. The Broncos won the Western Athletic Conference (WAC) championship with an undefeated 12–0 regular-season record (8–0 in the WAC), their second unbeaten regular season in the past three years. This was also Boise State's fifth consecutive season with at least a share of the WAC title, and the fourth in that period in which they went unbeaten in conference play. They became only the second team from outside the Bowl Championship Series (BCS) to play in a BCS bowl game when they faced Oklahoma in the 2007 Fiesta Bowl, defeating the Sooners in a dramatic thriller.

The Broncos completed the first undefeated and untied season in school history with a 43–42 overtime win over the Sooners. The Broncos led most of the game, but fell behind late in the fourth quarter when quarterback Jared Zabransky threw an interception that was returned for an Oklahoma touchdown. They tied the game on a 50-yard hook and lateral play that ended in a touchdown with 7 seconds left. In the overtime, Sooners star running back Adrian Peterson scored a touchdown on the first play of Oklahoma's possession. Zabransky led the Broncos on a touchdown drive, capped off by a trick play in which backup receiver Vinny Peretta connected with tight end Derek Schouman on a fourth-down pass. They then gambled for the win on a two-point conversion, and tried another trick play. The Broncos ran a play very similar to the Statue of Liberty play, with Zabransky looking toward three receivers before handing the ball off behind his back to star running back Ian Johnson, who ran into the end zone untouched for the win. The play would later be named the second greatest highlight of all time in a 2008 ESPN Sportscenter poll, behind Mike Eruzione's goal against the Soviets in the 1980 Miracle on Ice.

Due to Florida's 41–14 thrashing of previously unbeaten Ohio State in the BCS National Championship Game, the Broncos ended the season as the only undefeated team in NCAA Division I football, as no other team in Division I-AA (officially known as the "Football Championship Subdivision") finished undefeated (Three teams in lower divisions finished unbeaten: Grand Valley State in Division II, Mount Union in Division III, and Sioux Falls in NAIA.)

The Broncos play their home games at Bronco Stadium, most famous for its blue artificial turf surface, often referred to as the "Smurf-turf."

== Pre-season ==
The 2006 Broncos were an overwhelming favorite in the league's Preseason Media Poll to win the WAC title. They returned more starters than any other team in Division I FBS football—nine on offense and nine on defense, as well as their placekicker and punter. Among the returning starters was quarterback Jared Zabransky, whose 20 wins in the previous two seasons was the most by any returning quarterback in Division I FBS.

=== Pre-season awards ===
Korey Hall

- Dick Butkus Award watch list

Ian Johnson

- Walter Camp Award watch list
- Doak Walker Award watch list

Jared Zabransky

- Maxwell Award watch list
- Davey O'Brien Award watch list

== During the season ==
The Broncos started the season unranked in both the Coaches Poll or the AP Poll, and would not enter the polls until they had won their first three games. They steadily rose in the rankings mainly on the strength of an offense that finished the regular season second in scoring. The keys to their offense were running back Ian Johnson, who was the nation's leading scorer and second in rushing yards per game, and Zabransky, eighth in passing efficiency. Due to their threats on both the ground and in the air, they were one of only two teams in the country to rush and pass for over 200 yards per game (the other being Oklahoma State). In a more obscure statistic, they led the country in percentage of fourth-down conversions, converting 15 of 19 attempts.

The Broncos played five bowl-bound teams during the season—Oregon State, their only opponent from one of the six BCS conferences; Utah; and conference rivals Hawaii, San Jose State, and Nevada. Four out of five of these teams won their bowl game. The only loser, Nevada, lost by one point. Notably, they put a 42–14 defeat on an Oregon State team that would later in the season end the 38-game regular-season winning streak of USC.

=== Postseason awards ===
Chris Petersen

- Paul "Bear" Bryant Award winner
- AFCA Region 4 Coach of the Year
- Eddie Robinson Coach of the Year finalist

Korey Hall

- WAC Defensive Player of the Year
- Lott Trophy quarterfinalist

Ian Johnson

- Doak Walker Award semifinalist
- Walter Camp Award final watchlist

Jared Zabransky

- Maxwell Award semifinalist
- Davey O'Brien Award semifinalist
- Fiesta Bowl Most Valuable Player
- Cover athlete of NCAA Football 08 video game

2007 Espy Awards

- Best Game - 2007 Fiesta Bowl
- Best Play - Fiesta Bowl Statue of Liberty

== Schedule ==
Date	Time	Opponent	Rank	Site	TV	Result	Attendance	Source
August 31	7:00 p.m.	Sacramento State*		Bronco Stadium; Boise, ID	KTVB	W 45–0	29,647	
September 7	5:30 p.m.	Oregon State*		Bronco Stadium; Boise, ID	ESPN	W 42–14	30,711	
September 16	1:30 p.m.	at Wyoming*		War Memorial Stadium; Laramie, WY	MTN	W 17–10	17,880	
September 23	6:00 p.m.	Hawaii	No. 25	Bronco Stadium; Boise, ID	KTVB	W 41–34	30,642	
September 30	2:30 p.m.	at Utah*	No. 22	Rice–Eccles Stadium; Salt Lake City, UT	Versus	W 36–3	45,222	
October 7	6:00 p.m.	Louisiana Tech^{†}	No. 20	Bronco Stadium; Boise, ID	KTVB	W 55–14	30,572	
October 15	6:00 p.m.	at New Mexico State	No. 20	Aggie Memorial Stadium; Las Cruces, NM	ESPN	W 40–28	16,872	
October 21	3:00 p.m.	at Idaho	No. 18	Kibbie Dome; Moscow, ID (rivalry)	KTVB	W 42–26	17,000	
November 1	6:00 p.m.	Fresno State	No. 14	Bronco Stadium; Boise, ID (rivalry)	ESPN2	W 45–21	30,604	
November 11	4:00 p.m.	at San Jose State	No. 14	Spartan Stadium; San Jose, CA	KTVB	W 23–20	21,742	
November 18	1:00 p.m.	Utah State	No. 13	Bronco Stadium; Boise, ID	KTVB	W 49–10	30,515	
November 25	2:00 p.m.	at Nevada	No. 12	Mackay Stadium; Reno, NV (rivalry)	ESPN2	W 38–7	25,506	
January 1, 2007	6:00 p.m.	vs. No. 7 Oklahoma*	No. 9	University of Phoenix Stadium; Glendale, AZ (Fiesta Bowl)	FOX	W 43–42 ^{OT}	73,719	
*Non-conference game; ^{†}Homecoming; Rankings from AP Poll released prior to the game; All times are in Mountain time

== Rankings ==
Ranking movements Legend: ██ Increase in ranking ██ Decrease in ranking RV = Received votes ( ) = First-place votes
	Week															
Poll	Pre	1	2	3	4	5	6	7	8	9	10	11	12	13	14	Final
AP	RV	RV	RV	25	22	20	20	18	15	14	14	13	12	10	9	5 (1)
Coaches Poll	RV	RV	RV	25	22	21	19	17	15	14	13	13	12	9	9	6
Harris	Not released				22	22	21	18	16	15	14	13	12	9	9	Not released
BCS	Not released							15	15	14	14	12	11	8	8	Not released

== Roster ==
2006 Boise State Broncos football roster
Wide receivers: 1 Jerard Rabb^{†} - Senior; 4 Legedu Naanee - Senior; 9 Jeremy Childs - (redshirt) Freshman; 11 Drisan James^{†} - Senior; 19 Xavier Lucas - Freshman; 19 Vinny Perretta - Sophomore; 21 Toshi Franklin - Sophomore; 45 Jovan Hutchinson - Senior; 83 Nick Harris - Sophomore; 84 Aiona Key - (redshirt) Freshman; 87 Tanyon Bissell - Sophomore; Offensive guards: 61 Jeff Biedermann - Junior; 64 Pete Cavender* - Junior; 64 Jeff Cavender^{†} - Junior; 65 Cameron Filkins - (redshirt) Freshman; 66 Tad Miller^{†} - Junior; Offensive tackles: 60 Andrew Woodruff^{†} - Sophomore; 70 Tony Volponi - Senior; 71 Ryan Keating - Senior; 75 Dan Gore - Junior; 77 Ben Iannacchione - Sophomore; 79 Ryan Clady^{†} - Sophomore; Centers: 69 Jadon Dailey^{†} - Senior; 78 Paul Lucariello - (redshirt) Freshman; Offensive linemen: 62 Kevin Sapien - Freshman; 68 Mitch Rudder - Freshman; 72 Matt Slater - Freshman; 76 Jon Gott - Sophomore	Tight ends: 39 Ryan Putnam - Junior; 40 Richie Brockel - (redshirt) Freshman; 49 Jared Hunter - Senior; 80 Peter Elliott - Junior; 82 Julian Hawkins - Sophomore; 85 Tommy Gallarda - Freshman; 86 Sherm Blaser - Senior; 88 Chris O'Neill - Sophomore; 91 Derek Schouman^{†} - Senior; Fullbacks: 30 Michael Lose - Junior; 34 Brad Lau^{†} - Senior; 37 Michael Orris - (redshirt); Quarterbacks: 3 Bush Hamdan - Sophomore; 5 Jared Zabransky^{†} - Senior; 7 Michael Coughlin - Sophomore; 10 Taylor Tharp - Junior; 15 Nick Lomax - (redshirt) Freshman; Running backs: 27 Jeremy Avery - Freshman; 28 Jarvis Hodge - Freshman; 32 Andy Silsby - (redshirt) Freshman; 33 Jon Helmandollar - Junior; 35 Brett Denton - Junior; 41 Ian Johnson^{†} - Sophomore; Defensive ends: 48 Kapono Rawlins-Crivello - Freshman; 53 Sean Bingham - Sophomore; 74 Mike Dominguez - Senior (starting long snapper); 93 Mike T. Williams - Sophomore; 96 Mike G. Williams^{†} - Senior; 97 Nick Schlekeway^{†} - Junior; 98 Ryan Winterswyk - Freshman; Defensive tackles: 57 Andrew Browning^{†} - Senior; 59 Will Lawrence - Freshman; 67 Joe Bozikovich - Sophomore; 90 Ian Smart - Junior; 92 Dennis Ellis^{†} - Senior; 94 Phillip Edwards - Sophomore; 95 Sione Tavaki - Junior; 99 Steven Reveles - Junior	Linebackers: 13 Mike Altieri - Junior; 24 Tim Brady - Sophomore; 25 Korey Hall^{†} - Senior; 31 Colt Brooks^{†} - Senior; 43 David Shields^{†} - Sophomore; 44 Kyle Gingo - Sophomore; 51 Dallas Dobbs - Sophomore; 52 Derrell Acrey - Freshman; 55 Garrett Tuggle - Sophomore; 56 Josh Bean - Junior; Cornerbacks: 6 Rashaun Scott - Junior; 8 Orlando Scandrick^{†} - Sophomore; 16 Tristan Patin - (redshirt) Freshman; 22 Kyle Wilson^{†} - (redshirt) Freshman; 23 Quinton Jones - Senior (starting return specialist); 26 Ia Falo - Junior; 29 Evan Surratt - (redshirt) Freshman; 37 Austin Smith - Junior; Safeties: 2 Gerald Alexander^{†} - Senior; 14 Jason Robinson - Freshman; 18 Ellis Powers - Sophomore; 20 Marty Tadman^{†} - Junior; 36 Seth Anderson - (redshirt) Freshman; 38 Jeron Johnson - Freshman; 46 Jon Barry Van Hoogen - Sophomore; Punters: 42 Kyle Stringer^{†} - Senior (also holder); Kickers: 47 Anthony Montgomery^{†} - Senior
† Starter at position * Injured; did not play in 2006.
