= Jeff Rowe =

Jeff Rowe may refer to:

- Jeff Rowe (American football)
- Jeff Rowe (filmmaker)
