= 2006 Utah State Aggies football team =

American college football season

2006 Utah State Aggies football
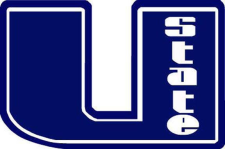
- Conference: Western Athletic Conference
- Record: 1–11 (1–7 WAC)
- Head coach: Brent Guy (2nd season)
- Offensive coordinator: Mike Santiago (games 1-5); Greg Stevens (games 6-12)
- Defensive coordinator: Mark Johnson (2nd season)
- Home stadium: Romney Stadium

2006 Western Athletic Conference football standings
	Conf.			Overall
Team	W		L	W		L
No. 5 Boise State $	8	–	0	13	–	0
Hawaii	7	–	1	11	–	3
San Jose State	5	–	3	9	–	4
Nevada	5	–	3	8	–	5
Fresno State	4	–	4	4	–	8
Idaho	3	–	5	4	–	8
New Mexico State	2	–	6	4	–	8
Louisiana Tech	1	–	7	3	–	10
Utah State	1	–	7	1	–	11
$ – Conference champion and BCS representative as top non-AQ school to meet automatic qualification criteria; Rankings from AP Poll

The 2006 Utah State Aggies football team represented Utah State University as a member of the Western Athletic Conference (WAC) in 2006 NCAA Division I FBS football season. The Aggies were led by second-year head coach Brent Guy and played their home games in Romney Stadium in Logan, Utah.

== Schedule ==
Date	Time	Opponent	Site	TV	Result	Attendance
September 2	2:30 pm	at Wyoming*	War Memorial Stadium; Laramie, WY (rivalry)		L 7–38	18,531
September 9	5:00 pm	at Arkansas*	Donald W. Reynolds Razorback Stadium; Fayetteville, AR		L 0–20	69,491
September 16	6:05 pm	Utah*	Romney Stadium; Logan, UT (Battle of the Brothers)	KJZZ	L 0–48	20,082
September 23	1:00 pm	at BYU*	LaVell Edwards Stadium; Provo, UT (Beehive Boot / Old Wagon Wheel)	mtn	L 0–38	58,659
September 30	1:05 pm	Idaho	Romney Stadium; Logan, UT		L 21–41	8,618
October 7	6:05 pm	Fresno State	Romney Stadium; Logan, UT	FSN	W 13–12	10,701
October 14	5:30 pm	at San Jose State	Spartan Stadium; San Jose, CA	WAC.tv	L 14–21	15,738
October 21	5:00 pm	at Louisiana Tech	Joe Aillet Stadium; Ruston, LA	CST	L 35–48	14,463
November 4	1:05 pm	Hawaii	Romney Stadium; Logan, UT	ESPN+	L 10–63	10,291
November 11	2:00 pm	at Nevada	Mackay Stadium; Reno, NV		L 0–42	8,584
November 18	1:00 pm	at No. 13 Boise State	Bronco Stadium; Boise, ID		L 10-49	30,515
November 25	1:05 pm	New Mexico State	Romney Stadium; Logan, UT		L 20–42	7,108
*Non-conference game; Rankings from Coaches' Poll released prior to the game; All times are in Mountain time
