= 2006 Idaho Vandals football team =

American college football season

2006 Idaho Vandals football
- Conference: Western Athletic Conference
- Record: 4–8 (3–5 WAC)
- Head coach: Dennis Erickson (5th season)
- Offensive coordinator: Dan Cozzetto (1st season)
- Offensive scheme: Spread
- Defensive coordinator: Jeff Mills (1st season)
- Base defense: 3–4
- Home stadium: Kibbie Dome

2006 Western Athletic Conference football standings
	Conf.			Overall
Team	W		L	W		L
No. 5 Boise State $	8	–	0	13	–	0
Hawaii	7	–	1	11	–	3
San Jose State	5	–	3	9	–	4
Nevada	5	–	3	8	–	5
Fresno State	4	–	4	4	–	8
Idaho	3	–	5	4	–	8
New Mexico State	2	–	6	4	–	8
Louisiana Tech	1	–	7	3	–	10
Utah State	1	–	7	1	–	11
$ – Conference champion and BCS representative as top non-AQ school to meet automatic qualification criteria; Rankings from AP Poll

The 2006 Idaho Vandals football team represented the University of Idaho during the 2006 NCAA Division I FBS football season. Idaho competed as a member of the Western Athletic Conference (WAC), and played their home games in the Kibbie Dome, an indoor facility on campus in Moscow, Idaho. In his second stint as the program's head coach, Dennis Erickson led the Vandals to wins in their first three conference games to move to 4–3 overall, Idaho then lost their final five games, all in conference to finish at 4–8 (3–5 in WAC, sixth), their seventh-straight season with a losing record.

Hired in February following the departure of Nick Holt for an assistant's position at USC, Erickson was previously the head coach of the Vandals from 1982 through 1985, his first collegiate head coaching position, and was most recently the head coach of the NFL's San Francisco 49ers. After just ten months back at Idaho, Erickson departed in December to become the head coach at Arizona State in the Pac-10 Conference.

== Schedule ==
Date	Time	Opponent	Site	TV	Result	Attendance	Source
September 2	9:00 am	at Michigan State*	Spartan Stadium; East Lansing, MI	ESPN Plus	L 17–27	70,711	
September 9	12:45 pm	at Washington State*	Martin Stadium; Pullman, WA (Battle of the Palouse)	FSN NW	L 10–56	29,431	
September 16	2:00 pm	Idaho State*	Kibbie Dome; Moscow, ID (rivalry)		W 27–24	15,162	
September 23	7:15 pm	at Oregon State*	Reser Stadium; Corvallis, OR	FSN NW	L 0–38	40,317	
September 30	12:00 pm	at Utah State	Romney Stadium; Logan, UT		W 41–21	8,618	
October 7	2:00 pm	New Mexico State^{†}	Kibbie Dome; Moscow, ID		W 28–20	15,107	
October 14	4:00 pm	at Louisiana Tech	Joe Aillet Stadium; Ruston, LA		W 24–14	19,231	
October 21	2:00 pm	No. 17 Boise State	Kibbie Dome; Moscow, ID (rivalry)	KTVB	L 26–42	17,000	
October 28	9:00 pm	at Hawaii	Aloha Stadium; Halawa, HI		L 10–68	34,051	
November 4	2:00 pm	Nevada	Kibbie Dome; Moscow, ID		L 7–45	15,013	
November 18	2:00 pm	at Fresno State	Bulldog Stadium; Fresno, CA		L 0–34	35,382	
November 25	2:00 pm	San José State	Kibbie Dome; Moscow, ID		L 13–28	10,435	
*Non-conference game; ^{†}Homecoming; Rankings from AP Poll released prior to the game

Idaho's reported home attendance for 2006 was 72,717 for five games, an average of 15,543. The maximum was 17,000 for the Boise State game on October 21, and the minimum was 10,435 for San Jose State on November 25, two days after Thanksgiving.
