= 2006 Fresno State Bulldogs football team =

American college football season

2006 Fresno State Bulldogs football
- Conference: Western Athletic Conference
- Record: 4–8 (4–4 WAC)
- Head coach: Pat Hill (10th season)
- Offensive coordinator: Steve Hagen (1st season)
- Offensive scheme: Pro-style
- Defensive coordinator: Dan Brown (6th season)
- Base defense: 4–3
- Home stadium: Bulldog Stadium (Capacity: 41,031)

2006 Western Athletic Conference football standings
	Conf.			Overall
Team	W		L	W		L
No. 5 Boise State $	8	–	0	13	–	0
Hawaii	7	–	1	11	–	3
San Jose State	5	–	3	9	–	4
Nevada	5	–	3	8	–	5
Fresno State	4	–	4	4	–	8
Idaho	3	–	5	4	–	8
New Mexico State	2	–	6	4	–	8
Louisiana Tech	1	–	7	3	–	10
Utah State	1	–	7	1	–	11
$ – Conference champion and BCS representative as top non-AQ school to meet automatic qualification criteria; Rankings from AP Poll

The 2006 Fresno State football team represented California State University, Fresno in the 2006 NCAA Division I FBS football season. They played their home games at Bulldog Stadium in Fresno, California and were coached by Pat Hill. The outcome of the 2006 season was a 4–8 record, the worst for Fresno State football since 1978, when the Bulldogs went 3–8. The Bulldogs lost all four non-conference games and also missed out on a bowl game for the first time in seven years. The Bulldogs also lost to rival San Jose State for the first time since 1990.

== Personnel ==
=== Coaching staff ===
Name	Position	Seasons at Fresno State	Alma mater
Pat Hill	Head coach	10th as HC; 16th overall	UC Riverside (1973)
Steve Hagen	Offensive coordinator/Quarterbacks	1st	California Lutheran University
Dan Brown	Defensive coordinator	10th	Boise State (1982)
Tom Mason	Linebackers	6th	Nevada (1977); Eastern Washington (1982)
John Baxter	Special Teams/Wide Receivers/Assistant Head Coach	10th	Loras College
Kerry Locklin	Defensive Line	7th	New Mexico State (1982)
Tim Skipper	1st	Running backs	Fresno State (2001)

== Schedule ==
Date	Time	Opponent	Site	TV	Result	Attendance
September 1	7:00 pm	Nevada	Bulldog Stadium; Fresno, CA (College Colors Day Kickoff Classic)	ESPN	W 28–19	39,269
September 9	5:00 pm	No. 20 Oregon*	Bulldog Stadium; Fresno, CA	ESPN	L 24–31	42,281
September 16	7:00 pm	at Washington*	Husky Stadium; Seattle, WA	FSN	L 20–21	57,012
September 30	7:00 pm	Colorado State*	Bulldog Stadium; Fresno, CA	BSN	L 23–35	42,012
October 7	5:00 pm	at Utah State	Romney Stadium; Logan, UT	BSN	L 12–13	10,701
October 14	2:00 pm	Hawaii	Bulldog Stadium; Fresno, CA (rivalry)	BSN	L 37–68	39,122
October 21	12:00 pm	at No. 14 LSU*	Tiger Stadium; Baton Rouge, LA	ESPN	L 6–38	91,833
November 1	5:00 pm	at No. 14 Boise State	Bronco Stadium; Boise, ID (Battle for the Milk Can)	ESPN2	L 21–45	30,604
November 11	2:00 pm	New Mexico State	Bulldog Stadium; Fresno, CA		W 23–18	33,241
November 18	2:00 pm	Idaho	Bulldog Stadium; Fresno, CA		W 34–0	35,382
November 29	6:00 pm	at Louisiana Tech	Joe Aillet Stadium; Ruston, LA	ESPN2	W 34–27	11,086
December 2	3:00 pm	at San Jose State	Spartan Stadium; San Jose, CA (rivalry)	BSN	L 14–24	22,235
*Non-conference game; Rankings from AP Poll released prior to the game; All times are in Pacific time

== Game summaries ==
=== Nevada ===
	1	2	3	4	Total
Wolf Pack	0	6	6	7	19
Bulldogs	7	7	7	7	28

=== No. 20 Oregon ===
	1	2	3	4	Total
No. 20 Ducks	14	0	10	7	31
Bulldogs	3	7	7	7	24

=== At Washington ===
	1	2	3	4	Total
Bulldogs	7	0	7	6	20
Huskies	7	7	0	7	21

=== Colorado State ===
	1	2	3	4	Total
Rams	7	7	14	7	35
Bulldogs	7	10	0	6	23

=== At Utah State ===
	1	2	3	4	Total
Bulldogs	0	0	7	5	12
Aggies	7	0	0	6	13

=== Hawaii ===
	1	2	3	4	Total
Warriors	21	21	20	6	68
Bulldogs	7	10	6	14	37

=== At No. 14 LSU ===
	1	2	3	4	Total
Bulldogs	0	3	3	0	6
No. 14 Tigers	14	3	7	14	38

=== At No. 14 Boise State ===
	1	2	3	4	Total
Bulldogs	7	0	7	7	21
No. 14 Broncos	10	14	14	7	45

=== New Mexico State ===
	1	2	3	4	Total
Aggies	0	12	6	0	18
Bulldogs	7	3	6	7	23

=== Idaho ===
	1	2	3	4	Total
Vandals	0	0	0	0	0
Bulldogs	7	10	10	7	34

=== At Louisiana Tech ===
	1	2	3	4	Total
Fresno State Bulldogs	0	14	7	13	34
Louisiana Tech Bulldogs	0	14	7	6	27

=== At San Jose State (Rivalry) ===
	1	2	3	4	Total
Bulldogs	0	14	0	0	14
Spartans	14	7	0	3	24
