= 2006 San Jose State Spartans football team =

American college football season

2006 San Jose State Spartans football

New Mexico Bowl champion

New Mexico Bowl, W 20–12 vs. New Mexico
- Conference: Western Athletic Conference
- Record: 9–4 (5–3 WAC)
- Head coach: Dick Tomey (2nd season)
- Defensive coordinator: Dave Fipp (2nd season)
- Home stadium: Spartan Stadium

2006 Western Athletic Conference football standings
	Conf.			Overall
Team	W		L	W		L
No. 5 Boise State $	8	–	0	13	–	0
Hawaii	7	–	1	11	–	3
San Jose State	5	–	3	9	–	4
Nevada	5	–	3	8	–	5
Fresno State	4	–	4	4	–	8
Idaho	3	–	5	4	–	8
New Mexico State	2	–	6	4	–	8
Louisiana Tech	1	–	7	3	–	10
Utah State	1	–	7	1	–	11
$ – Conference champion and BCS representative as top non-AQ school to meet automatic qualification criteria; Rankings from AP Poll

The 2006 San Jose State Spartans football team represented San Jose State University in the 2006 NCAA Division I FBS football season. The team played their home games at Spartan Stadium in San Jose, California. They participated as members of the Western Athletic Conference. They were coached by head coach Dick Tomey. The team clinched their first winning season since 2000 and their first bowl game since 1990.

== Schedule ==
Date	Time	Opponent	Site	TV	Result	Attendance
September 2	12:30 pm	at Washington*	Husky Stadium; Seattle, WA		L 29–35	52,256
September 9	3:00 pm	Stanford*	Spartan Stadium; San Jose, CA (rivalry)	CSNW	W 35–34	29,321
September 23	3:00 pm	Cal Poly*	Spartan Stadium; San Jose, CA	WAC.tv	W 17–7	15,684
September 30	3:00 pm	San Diego State*	Spartan Stadium; San Jose, CA	4SD	W 31–10	14,361
October 14	3:00 pm	Utah State	Spartan Stadium; San Jose, CA	WAC.tv	W 21–14	15,738
October 21	4:00 pm	at Nevada	Mackay Stadium; Reno, NV	ABC	L 7–23	19,636
October 28	3:00 pm	Louisiana Tech	Spartan Stadium; San Jose, CA	WAC.tv	W 44–10	12,897
November 4	5:00 pm	at New Mexico State	Aggie Memorial Stadium; Las Cruces, NM	WAC.tv	W 31–21	15,308
November 11	3:00 pm	No. 13 Boise State	Spartan Stadium; San Jose, CA		L 20–23	21,742
November 18	9:05 pm	at Hawaii	Aloha Stadium; Honolulu, HI (Dick Tomey Legacy Game)	Oceanic PPV	L 17–54	33,622
November 25	2:00 pm	at Idaho	Kibbie Dome; Moscow, ID		W 28–13	10,435
December 2	1:00 pm	Fresno State	Spartan Stadium; San Jose, CA (rivalry)	CSNW	W 24–14	22,235
December 23	1:30 pm	at New Mexico*	University Stadium; Albuquerque, NM (New Mexico Bowl)	ESPN	W 20–12	34,111
*Non-conference game; Rankings from AP Poll released prior to the game; All times are in Pacific time

== Game summaries ==
=== At Washington ===
	1	2	3	4	Total
Spartans	6	3	6	14	29
Huskies	7	14	7	7	35

=== Stanford ===
	1	2	3	4	Total
Cardinal	13	21	0	0	34
Spartans	7	14	14	0	35

=== Cal Poly ===
	1	2	3	4	Total
Mustangs	0	0	0	7	7
Spartans	0	10	7	0	17

=== San Diego State ===
	1	2	3	4	Total
Aztecs	0	10	0	0	10
Spartans	7	7	14	3	31

=== Utah State ===
	1	2	3	4	Total
Aggies	7	7	0	0	14
Spartans	0	7	7	7	21

=== At Nevada ===
	1	2	3	4	Total
Spartans	0	7	0	0	7
Wolf Pack	7	3	7	6	23

=== Louisiana Tech ===
	1	2	3	4	Total
Bulldogs	0	3	7	0	10
Spartans	3	20	7	14	44

=== At New Mexico State ===
	1	2	3	4	Total
Spartans	8	7	3	13	31
Aggies	14	7	0	0	21

=== No. 13 Boise State ===
	1	2	3	4	Total
No. 13 Broncos	0	6	6	11	23
Spartans	0	7	6	7	20

=== At Hawai'i ===
	1	2	3	4	Total
Spartans	0	10	7	0	17
Rainbow Warriors	10	10	27	7	54

=== At Idaho ===
	1	2	3	4	Total
Spartans	7	0	7	14	28
Vandals	0	10	3	0	13

=== Fresno State ===
	1	2	3	4	Total
Bulldogs	0	14	0	0	14
Spartans	14	7	0	3	24

=== At New Mexico (New Mexico Bowl) ===
	1	2	3	4	Total
Spartans	0	13	7	0	20
Lobos	0	3	0	9	12

== Coaching staff ==
Name	Position	Seasons at San Jose State	Alma mater
Dick Tomey	Head coach	2nd	DePauw (1961)
Keith Burns	Defensive coordinator	3rd	Arkansas (1982)
Brent Brennan	Wide receivers/Recruiting coordinator	2nd	UCLA (1996)
Ken Margerum	Co-offensive coordinator/Running backs	2nd	Stanford (1981)

== Awards ==
- Safety Dwight Lowery was selected as an All-American.
