= 2006 Louisiana Tech Bulldogs football team =

American college football season

2006 Louisiana Tech Bulldogs football
- Conference: Western Athletic Conference
- Record: 3–10 (1–7 WAC)
- Head coach: Jack Bicknell Jr. (8th season)
- Offensive coordinator: Conroy Hines (7th season)
- Defensive coordinator: George Darlington (1st season)
- Captains: Dez Abrams; Anthony James; Brannon Jackson; Josh Muse; Eric Newman
- Home stadium: Joe Aillet Stadium

2006 Western Athletic Conference football standings
	Conf.			Overall
Team	W		L	W		L
No. 5 Boise State $	8	–	0	13	–	0
Hawaii	7	–	1	11	–	3
San Jose State	5	–	3	9	–	4
Nevada	5	–	3	8	–	5
Fresno State	4	–	4	4	–	8
Idaho	3	–	5	4	–	8
New Mexico State	2	–	6	4	–	8
Louisiana Tech	1	–	7	3	–	10
Utah State	1	–	7	1	–	11
$ – Conference champion and BCS representative as top non-AQ school to meet automatic qualification criteria; Rankings from AP Poll

The 2006 Louisiana Tech Bulldogs football team represented Louisiana Tech University as a member of the Western Athletic Conference (WAC) during the 2006 NCAA Division I FBS football season. Led by eighth-year head coach Jack Bicknell Jr., the Bulldogs played their home games at Joe Aillet Stadium in Ruston, Louisiana. Louisiana Tech finished the season with a record of 3–10 overall and a mark of 1–7 in conference play, tying for eighth place in the WAC.

== Schedule ==
Date	Time	Opponent	Site	TV	Result	Attendance
September 2	2:30 pm	at No. 20 Nebraska*	Memorial Stadium; Lincoln, NE	FSN	L 10–49	85,181
September 16	6:00 pm	Nicholls State*	Joe Aillet Stadium; Ruston, LA	CST	W 31–21	18,765
September 23	6:00 pm	at Texas A&M*	Kyle Field; College Station, TX		L 14–45	68,563
September 30	6:00 pm	at No. 18 Clemson*	Memorial Stadium; Clemson, SC	ESPNU	L 0–51	81,564
October 7	7:00 pm	at No. 20 Boise State	Bronco Stadium; Boise, ID	KTVB/CST	L 14–55	30,572
October 14	6:00 pm	Idaho^{†}	Joe Aillet Stadium; Ruston, LA		L 14–24	19,231
October 21	6:00 pm	Utah State	Joe Aillet Stadium; Ruston, LA	CST	W 48–35	14,463
October 28	5:00 pm	at San Jose State	Spartan Stadium; San Jose, CA		L 10–44	12,897
November 4	6:00 pm	at North Texas*	Fouts Field; Denton, TX		W 34–31	11,103
November 11	10:00 pm	at Hawaii	Aloha Stadium; Honolulu, HI		L 17–61	32,083
November 18	7:00 pm	Nevada	Joe Aillet Stadium; Ruston, LA		L 0–42	9,383
November 24	8:00 pm	Fresno State	Joe Aillet Stadium; Ruston, LA	ESPN2	L 27–34	11,086
December 2	2:00 pm	at New Mexico State	Aggie Memorial Stadium; Las Cruces, NM		L 23–50	13,568
*Non-conference game; ^{†}Homecoming; Rankings from AP Poll released prior to the game; All times are in Central time
