= 2006 MPC Computers Bowl =

- Postseason bowl game
Miami Hurricanes	Nevada Wolf Pack
(6–6)	(8–4)
ACC	WAC
21	20
Head coach: Larry Coker	Head coach: Chris Ault
	1	2	3	4	Total
Miami	7	7	7	0	21
Nevada	2	9	3	6	20
- Date: December 31, 2006
- Season: 2006
- Stadium: Bronco Stadium
- Location: Boise, Idaho
- MVP: Miami: Kirby Freeman, QB; Nevada: Jeff Rowe, QB
- Favorite: Miami by 3
- Referee: Randy Smith (Big East)

United States TV coverage
- Network: ESPN
- Announcers: Mark Jones, David Norrie, & Heather Cox

The 2006 MPC Computers Bowl was a postseason college football bowl game held on December 31, 2006 at Bronco Stadium in Boise, Idaho. The game featured tie-ins between the Atlantic Coast Conference (ACC) which was represented by the Miami Hurricanes and the Western Athletic Conference (WAC), represented by the Nevada Wolf Pack. The game was sponsored by the MPC Corporation which was formerly known as Micron.

== Team comparison ==
Pre-season the ACC media favored Miami to win the conference but Miami posted a 6–6 record in the regular season. A brawl during the FIU game and the murder of defensive lineman Bryan Pata also marred the season. Miami fired head coach Larry Coker at the end of the season and named defensive coordinator Randy Shannon as his successor to take effect after the bowl game. The Hurricanes were ranked the third-best rushing defense in the nation, having allowed 792 yards on the ground. The Miami secondary, however, had proven somewhat porous by allowing 2,233 passing yards. The Hurricanes offense had struggled and quarterback Kyle Wright had thrown eight touchdowns and seven interceptions. He suffered a broken thumb and was replaced late in the season by Kirby Freeman for the last three games. Freeman threw for five touchdowns and seven interceptions. On the ground, Miami gained 2,295 rushing yards.

Nevada, led by long-time head coach Chris Ault had performed according to expectations during the season, finishing the regular season 8–4. Quarterback Jeff Rowe passed for over 2,000 yards and a completion rate of 64.7%, but had also suffered 25 sacks. The Wolf Pack recorded 2,128 rushing yards, led by Robert Hubbard and Luke Lippincott. The Nevada defense recorded 19 interceptions to tie for eighth in the nation and allowed an average of 19 points per game.

== Game summary ==
Miami tallied first when Kirby Freeman led a 70–yard, 13–play drive capped with a one–yard quarterback keeper. With five seconds remaining in the first quarter, Nevada recorded a safety by forcing Freeman to intentionally ground the ball. In the second quarter, Jeff Rowe connected with receiver Marko Mitchell for a 27–yard touchdown, but a two-point conversion attempt failed. In the following possession, an 80–yard, four-play Miami drive culminated with a 52–yard Freeman pass to Ryan Moore. With five seconds remaining in the half, Nevada kicker Brett Jaekle made good a 33–yard field goal attempt. Miami led at halftime, 14–11.

In the third quarter, Jaekle connected on a second 31–yard field goal to equalize the score. On the first play of their next possession, Freeman completed a pass to Sam Shields for a 78–yard touchdown. In the fourth quarter, Jaekle made 44– and 40–yard field goals to close the deficit to one-point. In the final minute, defensive back Chavez Grant intercepted a pass from Jeff Rowe on the Hurricane 33–yard line to seal the victory for Miami, 21–20.
