= Colt Brennan =

American football player (1983–2021)

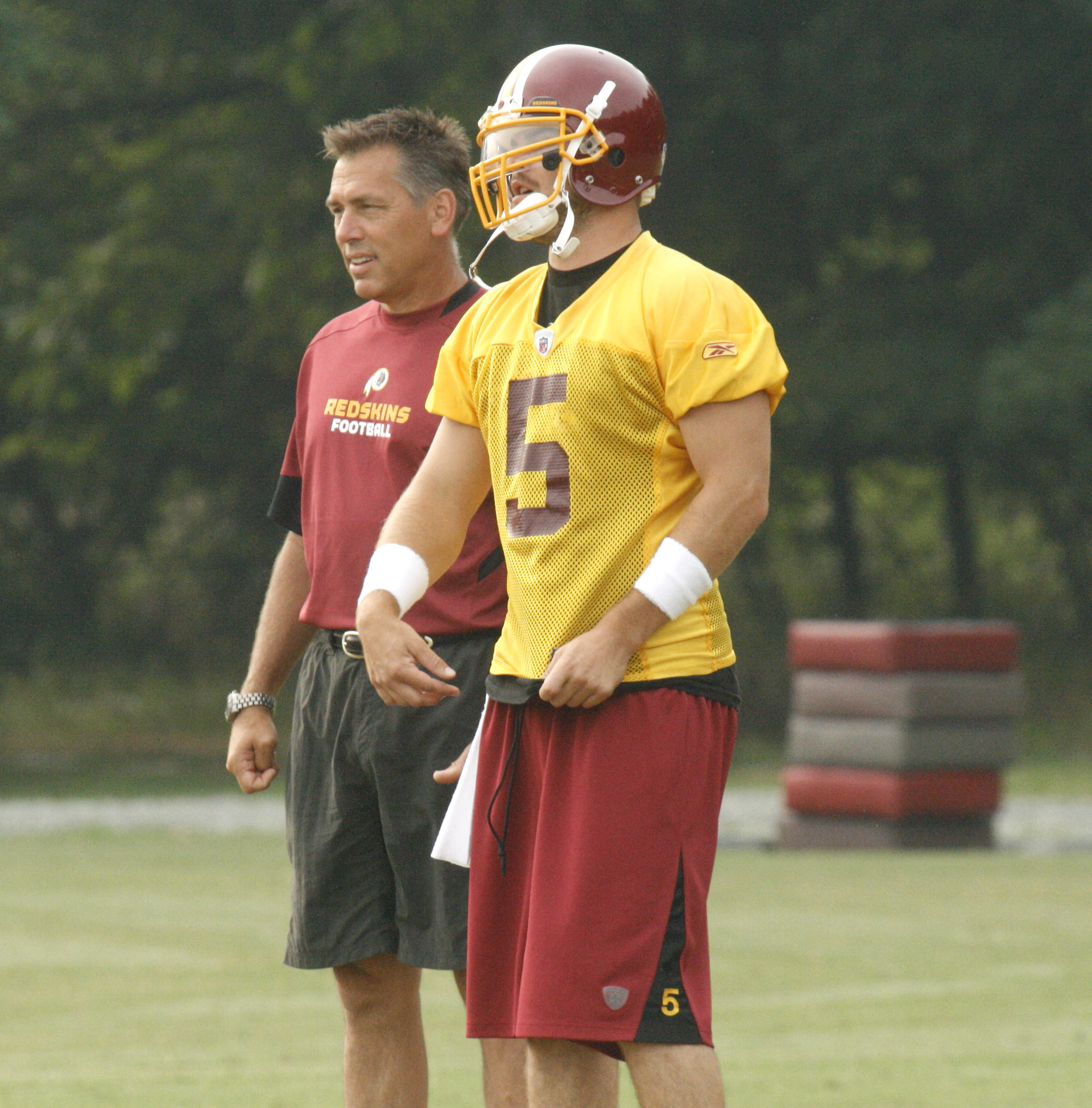
- Brennan (right) with coach Jim Zorn in 2008

No. 5
- Position: Quarterback

Personal information
- Born: August 16, 1983; Laguna Beach, California, U.S.
- Died: May 11, 2021 (aged 37); Newport Beach, California, U.S.
- Listed height: 6 ft 3 in (1.91 m)
- Listed weight: 206 lb (93 kg)

Career information
- High school: Mater Dei (Santa Ana, California)
- College: Colorado (2002–2003); Saddleback (2004); Hawaii (2005–2007)
- NFL draft: 2008: 6th round, 186th overall pick

Career history
- Washington Redskins (2008–2009); Oakland Raiders (2010)*; Hartford Colonials (2011)*; Saskatchewan Roughriders (2012)*; Los Angeles Kiss (2014)*
- * Offseason or practice squad member only

Awards and highlights
- Sammy Baugh Trophy (2006); 2× Third-team All-American (2006, 2007); 2× NCAA passing yards leader (2005, 2006); 2× WAC Offensive Player of the Year (2006, 2007); 2× First-team All-WAC (2006, 2007); Hawaii Rainbow Warriors No. 15 retired
- Stats at Pro Football Reference

Colton James Brennan (August 16, 1983 – May 11, 2021) was an American football quarterback. He played college football for the Colorado Buffaloes, Saddleback Gauchos, and Hawaii Rainbow Warriors. With the Rainbow Warriors, he was a two-time third-team All-American and two-time NCAA passing leader. Brennan was selected by the Washington Redskins of the National Football League (NFL) in the sixth round of the 2008 NFL draft, but never played in a regular season NFL game.

== Early life ==
Brennan attended Mater Dei High School in California. He helped Mater Dei advance to the league championship in basketball as a senior. While at Mater Dei, he was the backup quarterback to Matt Leinart until Leinart graduated. After graduating from Mater Dei, Brennan attended Worcester Academy in Massachusetts for a postgraduate year, where his primary receiver was David Ball, who later would break Jerry Rice's college record for touchdown receptions in Division I-AA.

== College career ==
=== Colorado ===
Brennan originally attended the University of Colorado at Boulder (Colorado) in 2002 as a walk-on. He spent the year as a redshirt.

On January 28, 2004, Brennan entered the dorm room of a female student, uninvited, and, according to the victim, "exposed himself and fondled her," a charge which Brennan denied. Brennan, who was intoxicated at the time of the incident, was arrested and eventually convicted of charges of felony burglary and trespassing (serving one week in jail along with probation until he graduated from college), but a guilty verdict for unlawful sexual contact was vacated by the court for lack of evidence. Brennan was court ordered to take a polygraph test about the incident and passed. He later showed those results to Saddleback College President Richard McCullough. After the incident, which occurred during a period of time when Colorado was experiencing accusations of sex crimes and wild recruiting parties involving several athletes, he was cut from the team for the incident.

=== Saddleback ===
Brennan then transferred to Saddleback College in California in 2004 and helped lead the school to a conference championship. He was named honorable mention JUCO All-American, state offensive player of the year by the JuCal Transfer, and first-team all-conference for his performance in that season. He repaired his image well enough for the University of Hawaii head coach June Jones to offer him a walk-on opportunity. Looking to put some distance between himself and his past problems and interested in Jones' quarterback knowledge, Brennan accepted the offer and turned down an offer from San Jose State.

=== Hawaii ===
==== 2005 ====
Brennan transferred to University of Hawaiʻi at Mānoa (Hawaii) in 2005 and quickly earned the starting quarterback job. He started 10 of 12 games, the only games he did not start being against USC and San Diego State. He either tied or broke 11 school offensive records in what was a successful first season with the Rainbow Warriors. He led the country in total offense yards (4,455) and touchdowns thrown (35). His 4,301 yards passing is the eighth-most in Western Athletic Conference (WAC) history. Against New Mexico State, he recorded career-high numbers in passing yards (515), touchdowns (7), and pass completions (38). He also had nine 300+ yard performances on the season, including four 400+ yard games. Despite leading the country in several statistical categories, he was not named to the All-WAC team (being passed over for Paul Pinegar and Jeff Rowe).

==== 2006 ====
Brennan entered 2006 as the undisputed starter at quarterback, was named to multiple award watch lists and was voted the WAC's preseason Offensive Player of the Year. He led the nation in scoring and passing efficiency, finishing the regular season with a 182.8 rating, and completed 72.15% of his passes, the best in Division I-A.

During the regular season, Brennan passed for 53 touchdowns, falling one touchdown pass short of the NCAA Division I-A single-season record of 54 set by David Klingler of Houston in 1990. On December 24, 2006, at the Hawaii Bowl, Brennan threw for five touchdowns to bring his season total to a record-breaking 58 to break Klinger's record. Prior to 2002 statistics from postseason games did not count towards records. Brennan's 58 touchdowns were accumulated in 14 games, while Klinger's 54 touchdowns were accumulated in 11 games. The team finished the season with an 11–3 record, finishing second in the WAC behind Boise State.

Brennan finished 6th in the voting for the 2006 Heisman Trophy, behind Troy Smith, Darren McFadden, Brady Quinn, Steve Slaton, and Mike Hart. During the season, Brennan passed for 5,549 yards and 58 touchdowns, both of which are school records, and had the highest passer efficiency rating in the nation. According to Jones, "Colt is a money guy. Colt is what I said he is: the best college quarterback in America, and he proved it tonight." During a press conference on January 17, Brennan announced that he was returning to the University of Hawaii for his senior season. He didn't feel he was fully prepared for the NFL and needed another year to get ready. He returned to Hawaii as a Heisman front runner and one of the NCAA's most prolific passers. Rivals.com named him one of the top 10 quarterbacks going into the 2007 season.

==== 2007 ====
On November 23, 2007, he broke the major college career record for touchdown passes, throwing five touchdown passes against then No. 17 Boise State. He threw the record-breaking 122nd in the first quarter, a six-yard touchdown pass to Ryan Grice-Mullen to surpass the mark set by BYU quarterback Ty Detmer in 1991. With the pass, Brennan also broke Detmer's record for the player responsible for the most touchdowns with 136. Hawaii beat Washington 35–28 in the final game of the regular season to finish with a 12–0 record, finishing the 2007 season ranked No. 10 on the AP Top 25, earning a bid to 2007 BCS Sugar Bowl against the No. 5 ranked Georgia Bulldogs.

The Sugar Bowl turned out to be a one-sided affair, as Georgia defeated Hawaii 41–10. Brennan completed 22-of-38 for 169 yards, while throwing three interceptions. Throughout the game, Georgia was able to effectively apply pressure rushing only three defensive linemen, allowing Georgia to drop eight men into coverage. This game cost Brennan the all-time passer efficiency rating that he held prior to the game. He was later quoted as saying, "This is not how I wanted my career to end." He finished the season with 38 touchdowns and 17 interceptions. Brennan was selected for the second year in a row as a Heisman trophy finalist, this time finishing in third place behind Tim Tebow and Darren McFadden. At the end of the season, he was invited to participate in the 2008 Senior Bowl, where he suffered a torn labrum in his right hip during the first day of practice. He still managed to play in the game.

==== June Jones ====
June Jones, Brennan's coach at Hawaii, had a large impact upon his career and helped him become one of the most prolific passers in NCAA Division 1 history. In a short January 6, 2008 interview Brennan said of Jones: "He's obviously done a lot for me because he gave me a chance and that's really what I was looking for... He really gave me the confidence to take my game to the next level and give me the confidence to play like an All-American." Jones was instrumental in bringing Brennan to Hawaii during his sophomore year.

=== Awards and honors ===
- 2× First-team All-WAC (2006–2007)
- 2× WAC Offensive P.O.Y. (2006–2007)
- 2× Third-team AP All-American (2006–2007)
- 2× Davey O'Brien Award finalist (2006)
- Sammy Baugh Trophy (2006)
- Johnny Unitas Golden Arm Award finalist (2007)
- Heisman Trophy finalist (2007)

=== Records ===
- Second all-time in most career touchdowns responsible for (146). Achieved November 23, 2007.
- NCAA record for most 400 yard games (20).
- Tied NCAA record for most career touchdown passes by a quarterback-receiver combination (39 to Davone Bess). Achieved November 23, 2007.
- Former record for passing efficiency (season), 186.0 (2006).
- NCAA record for most points responsible (for season) with 384. (2006)
- Second all-time for highest pass completion percentage (career) with 70.4%. This record was eclipsed by Dan Persa during the 2011 season.
- Fourth all-time in career touchdown passes with 131, a former record.
- Sixth all-time in total passing yards with 14,193.

=== College statistics ===
Legend
	Led the NCAA
**Bold**	Career high

Season	Team	Games			Passing								Rushing			
Season	Team	GP	GS	Record	Cmp	Att	Pct	Yds	Avg	TD	Int	Rate	Att	Yds	Avg	TD
2004	Saddleback	13	—	—	238	366	65.0	3,395	9.3	30	7	176.7	66	57	0.9	1
2005	Hawaii	12	10	4–6	350	515	68.0	4,301	8.4	35	13	155.5	**99**	154	1.6	2
2006	Hawaii	**14**	**14**	11–3	**406**	**559**	**72.6**	**5,549**	**9.9**	**58**	12	**186.0**	86	**366**	**4.3**	5
2007	Hawaii	12	12	**11–1**	359	510	70.4	4,343	8.5	38	**17**	159.8	82	27	0.3	**8**
NCAA career		38	36	26–10	1,115	1,584	70.4	14,193	9.0	131	42	167.6	267	547	2.0	15

== Professional career ==
Pre-draft measurables
Height	Weight	Arm length	Hand span	40-yard dash
6 ft 2 3/8 in (1.89 m)	207 lb (94 kg)	32 1/2 in (0.83 m)	9 1/2 in (0.24 m)	4.79 s
All values from NFL Combine

=== Washington Redskins ===
Brennan was drafted by the Washington Redskins in the sixth round (186th overall) of the 2008 NFL draft. He was the tenth quarterback selected in the draft. On July 14, he signed a four-year, $1.8 million contract.

Brennan appeared in his first NFL preseason game in the 2008 Hall of Fame Game, against the Indianapolis Colts on August 3. He was impressive in his debut, completing 9-of-10 passes for 123 yards and two touchdowns for a 157.5 passer rating in the Redskins' victory. Brennan's success continued two weeks later against the New York Jets when he completed 4-of-5 passes for 79 yards and threw the game-winning touchdown on a 33-yard pass to wide receiver Jason Goode. He led all 2008 NFL rookies through the preseason in touchdown passes (three), passing yards (411), and quarterback rating (109.9). He went 36-for-53 with no interceptions for a completion percentage of 67.9%. He also carried the ball twice for 11 yards. He saw no game time in the regular season.

Brennan was placed on injured reserve on September 4, 2009, thus ending his 2009 season, due to a torn hamstring and a hip injury. The hip injury was similar to one he suffered while in college at Hawaii and required surgery. On August 2, 2010, the Redskins traded for Baltimore Ravens quarterback John Beck, thus making Brennan expendable. He was subsequently released.

=== Oakland Raiders ===
On August 7, 2010, Brennan signed with the Oakland Raiders. He was cut on September 4, never having played a regular season game in the NFL.

=== Hartford Colonials ===
On June 3, 2011, Brennan signed with the Hartford Colonials in the United Football League for the 2011 season. The league suspended operations of the Colonials on August 10. Brennan was not selected by any of the four remaining UFL teams in a dispersal draft held on August 15.

=== Saskatchewan Roughriders ===
On February 28, 2012, Brennan signed with the Saskatchewan Roughriders of the Canadian Football League. The announcement was widely reported online and attracted widespread attention in its aftermath. Although he was expected to be the third-string backup behind Darian Durant and Drew Willy, the Roughriders later signed former NFL journeyman J. T. O'Sullivan, pushing Brennan down in the depth chart. Brennan was released on June 11.

=== Los Angeles Kiss ===
On October 29, 2013, Brennan was assigned to the Los Angeles Kiss of the Arena Football League. However, he was cut by the Kiss on March 8, 2014, after being diagnosed with a brain injury resulting from a 2010 car crash (see below). Brennan's experience with the Kiss became the focus of the first episode of 4th and Loud, a reality television series about the team.

== Personal life ==
Brennan was a communications major. On December 16, 2007, Brennan received his Bachelor of Arts in communications and a 27-second standing ovation. Hawaii-based venture capitalist Barry Weinman wore Brennan's No. 15 jersey while delivering the commencement address at the 2007 graduation.

His cousin Brent Brennan is a college football coach who was the head coach at San Jose State from 2017 to 2023 and at Arizona beginning at the start of the 2024 season.

On November 19, 2010, Brennan was hospitalized and listed in serious condition after he was a passenger in a car crash in the Big Island of Hawai'i. The crash left him with a traumatic brain injury, broken ribs and collar bone, which according to his family affected him emotionally in the following years. He was released from Queen's Medical Center on November 27, 2010, and headed to his parents' home in Southern California to continue his recovery. He described his injuries in 2014:

All I know is I woke up, six, seven days later, [...] and I was—and I still am—a different person. I suffered minor TBI—traumatic brain injury. I just have a small scar, you know, on my brain, but it's in an area that makes you impulsive and emotional. I've had to learn how to control that.

== Legal issues ==
Brennan was arrested on July 25, 2012, in Kailua, Honolulu County, Hawaii, on suspicion of driving under the influence and third-degree promotion of a dangerous drug. His blood-alcohol level was 0.17 percent, more than twice the legal limit for driving a vehicle. He was released the next day without charges. In August 2012, Brennan was charged with drunken driving, but he was not charged for cocaine residue found in a plastic packet in the car. Despite entering a not guilty plea in November 2012, Brennan pleaded guilty to driving under the influence of alcohol on July 31, 2013, and he paid a $300 fine.

In 2015, Brennan allegedly filed a false police report that his vehicle was stolen, something his attorney blamed on memory problems stemming from his 2010 car crash injuries. Charges were later dropped.

On December 10, 2019, Brennan was arrested once again for operating a vehicle under the influence in Kaneohe.

On August 1, 2020, Brennan was arrested for trespassing and refusing to leave a hotel in Kailua-Kona while "heavily intoxicated". He was charged with second-degree trespassing; bail was set at $250, but he remained in jail until his hearing several days later. The judge granted his lawyer's request for court-supervised release without bail until his next scheduled court appearance later that month.

== Death ==
On May 10, 2021, Brennan was found unconscious in a hotel room after ingesting fentanyl. He was hospitalized in Newport Beach, California, and died the following day, at age 37. With his father's assistance, Brennan had attempted to enter a detox center at Hoag Hospital in Newport Beach hours before ingesting fentanyl, but the hospital eventually turned him away because there were no open beds available, and the hospital had failed to contact Brennan's father despite promising to call him back.

In the immediate aftermath of his death, many released statements mourning his death. Hawaii governor David Ige said of Brennan: "He will always be remembered for his brilliance, his leadership and how he and his team brought the people of Hawaii together during that exciting and memorable 2007 season."

On February 25, 2022, a further investigation revealed that Brennan had Stage 1 CTE. He was one of at least 345 NFL players to be diagnosed after death with this disease, which is caused by repeated hits to the head. In addition, there were multiple substances in his system, including ethanol, methamphetamines, amphetamines, and fentanyl in the autopsy report.

== See also ==
- List of NCAA Division I FBS career passing yards leaders
- List of NCAA Division I FBS career passing touchdowns leaders
- List of NCAA major college football yearly passing leaders
- List of NCAA major college football yearly total offense leaders
