= Jerard Rabb =

American football player (born 1984)

No. 11, 19
- Position: Wide receiver

Personal information
- Born: August 19, 1984 (age 42); El Modena, California, U.S.
- Listed height: 6 ft 2 in (1.88 m)
- Listed weight: 199 lb (90 kg)

Career information
- College: Boise State
- NFL draft: 2007: undrafted

Career history
- Dallas Cowboys (2007)*; San Francisco 49ers (2007–2008)*; Boise Burn (2008–2009)
- * Offseason or practice squad member only

Jerard Rabb (born August 19, 1984) is an American former football wide receiver. He played college football at Boise State. Rabb, along with Drisan James, was a component of the famous Hook and Lateral play that led the Broncos into overtime against the Oklahoma Sooners in the 2007 Fiesta Bowl.

He was a member of the Dallas Cowboys, San Francisco 49ers, and Boise Burn.

== Early life ==
Rabb attended El Modena High School in Orange, California and was a student and a letterman in football and basketball. In football, he was named as an All-League selection and was chosen as an All-State selection. Rabb graduated from El Modena High School in 2002.

== College career ==
Rabb began his college football career at Saddleback Community College in Mission Viejo, California. His quarterback at Saddleback was Colt Brennan. As a sophomore, Rabb was named Mission Conference offensive player of the year after catching 83 passes for 1,368 yards and 15 touchdowns.

As a junior at Boise State in 2005, Rabb snared 38 passes for 572 yards (15.1 avg.) and five touchdowns. In his senior season, he caught 37 balls for 586 yards (15.8 avg.) and four touchdowns.

== Professional career ==
=== Pre-draft ===
Rabb recorded a 4.58-second 40-yard dash time at the 2007 NFL Scouting Combine. He also posted a 36.5-inch vertical jump, a 6.99-second 3-cone drill time, and a 4.19-second 20-yard shuttle time.

=== Dallas Cowboys ===
Rabb was signed as an undrafted free agent by the Dallas Cowboys in 2007. He was released before the end of the season and never made it on to the active roster.

=== San Francisco 49ers ===
After being on the practice squad for the final two weeks of the season, Rabb was signed to a futures contract by the San Francisco 49ers on January 14, 2008. He was cut during final preseason cuts on August 30, 2008.

=== Boise Burn ===
Rabb entered the 2009 season with AF2's Boise Burn. He experienced some success in 2009, including a big touchdown catch against the Amarillo Venom.

== Post-career life ==
Rabb now works as a scheduler for Boeing. He also runs the Gridiron Dreams football camp.
