= Tommy Gallarda =

American football player (born 1988)

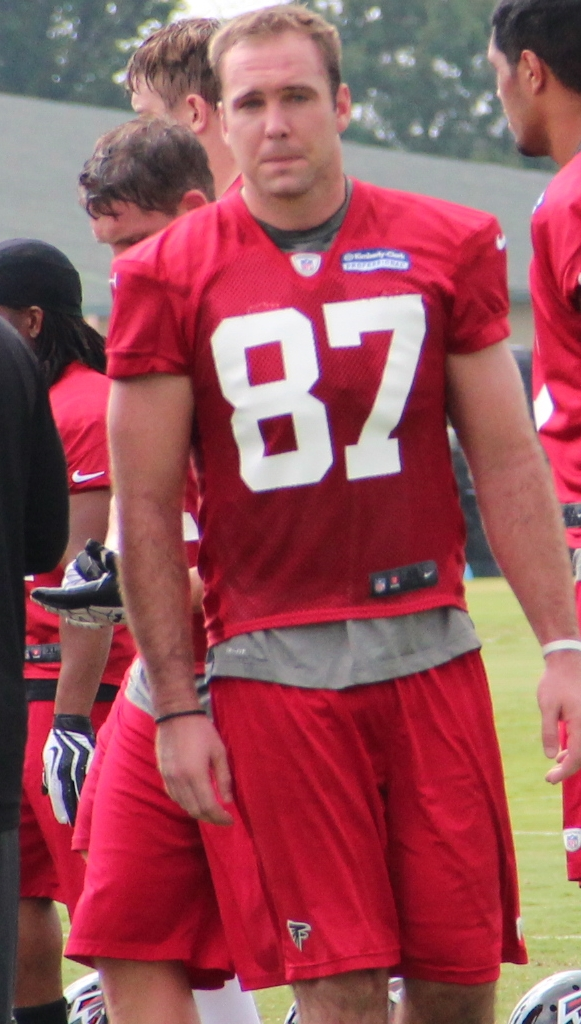
- Gallarda in 2013

No. 87
- Position: Tight end

Personal information
- Born: May 8, 1988 (age 38); Brea, California, U.S.
- Listed height: 6 ft 5 in (1.96 m)
- Listed weight: 262 lb (119 kg)

Career information
- High school: Brea Olinda
- College: Boise State
- NFL draft: 2011: undrafted

Career history
- Jacksonville Jaguars (2011)*; Atlanta Falcons (2011−2013)
- * Offseason or practice squad member only

Career NFL statistics
- Receptions: 1
- Receiving yards: 7
- Stats at Pro Football Reference

Tommy Gallarda (born May 5, 1988) is an American former professional football player who was a tight end in the National Football League (NFL). He signed with the Jacksonville Jaguars as an undrafted free agent in 2011. He played college football for the Boise State Broncos.

== Early life ==
He was a three-year letterman in football, track and field at Brea Olinda High School. He was selected to the All-Century League team twice both on offense and defense. He was also the Century League Defensive MVP.

== College career ==
Gallarda committed to Boise State University on January 4, 2006, during a home visit from Chris Petersen and Bryan Harsin. Petersen had asked Gallarda "Is there any way to get you to commit tonight?", Gallarda jokingly responded "If Vince Young scores the game-winning touchdown." Young scored the eventual game-winning touchdown on an eight-yard run with 19 seconds left in the game to give the University of Texas a one-point lead over USC which they held to win the 2006 Rose Bowl. Gallarda signed his letter of intent to play with Boise State on February 1, 2006.

In his freshman year, he played in 3 games, he recorded 3 receptions for 19 yards as a backup tight end.

In his sophomore year, he played 13 games in which he had 6 receptions, 65 receiving yards and 2 receiving touchdowns.

In his junior year, he played 14 games and started 12 games in which he recorded 9 receptions for 110 yards and 4 receiving touchdowns. On October 14, 2009, in a regular season game against Tulsa in which he recorded 3 receptions for 15 yards and a touchdown.

In his senior year, he recorded 7 receptions, 63 receiving yards and 3 receiving touchdowns. On September 6, 2010, in a regular season game against No. 13 ranked Virginia Tech in which Gallarda had 2 receptions for 4 yards and a touchdown as Boise State wins 33-30. On September 25, 2010, he had a 6-yard receiving touchdown against No. 24 Oregon State as Boise State wins 37-24.

== Professional career ==
=== Jacksonville Jaguars ===
On July 26, 2011, he signed with the Jacksonville Jaguars as an undrafted free agent. On September 2, 2011, he was released.

=== Atlanta Falcons ===
He signed with the Atlanta Falcons to join the practice squad. On November 29, 2011, he was released from the practice squad. On January 10, 2012, he was signed to reserve/future contract. On September 1, 2012, he made the 53-man roster. On August 4, 2013, Gallarda was waived with an injury settlement.
