= Jeff Rowe (American football) =

American football player (born 1984)

No. 3
- Position: Quarterback

Personal information
- Born: March 21, 1984 (age 42); Reno, Nevada, U.S.
- Listed height: 6 ft 5 in (1.96 m)
- Listed weight: 221 lb (100 kg)

Career information
- High school: Robert McQueen (Reno)
- College: Nevada
- NFL draft: 2007: 5th round, 151st overall pick

Career history
- Cincinnati Bengals (2007–2008); Seattle Seahawks (2008); New England Patriots (2009)*
- * Offseason or practice squad member only

Awards and highlights
- Second-team All-WAC (2005)
- Stats at Pro Football Reference

Jeff Rowe (born March 21, 1984) is an American former professional football player who was a quarterback in the National Football League (NFL). He was selected by the Cincinnati Bengals in the fifth round of the 2007 NFL draft. He played college football for the Nevada Wolf Pack.

He was also a member of the Seattle Seahawks and New England Patriots.

== Early life ==
Rowe attended Robert McQueen High School in Reno, Nevada and led his team to the 2001 state title game, his only season as the starter, throwing for 2,059 yards and 27 touchdowns.

== College career ==
Rowe attended the University of Nevada, Reno. In his true freshman season of 2002, Rowe played in six games as the backup quarterback, throwing for 138 yards and one touchdown. In 2003, Rowe was named the most improved offensive back during spring drills and became the team's starter before suffering a shoulder injury early in the year. He threw for 259 yards and one touchdown and was redshirted for the season. In 2004, Rowe started all 14 games for the Nevada Wolf Pack, passing for 2,633 yards and 15 touchdowns, while rushing for another 129 yards. In his junior season in 2005, Rowe started all 12 games, throwing for 2,925 yards and 21 touchdowns. He also ran 119 times for 244 yards and six touchdowns. He earned second-team All-Western Athletic Conference honors and was his team's offensive most outstanding player. In 2006, his senior season, Rowe missed one game with a hamstring injury, but in his 12 starts he threw for 1,907 yards and 17 touchdowns. Rowe was the MVP of the 2006 MPC Computers Bowl. Following the season, he was named as the team's most valuable player. He compiled 7,862 yards in his college career, ranking him fifth in the school's history. Rowe was also the MVP of the 2007 East-West Shrine Game.

== Professional career ==
=== Cincinnati Bengals ===
Rowe was selected by the Cincinnati Bengals in the fifth round (151st overall) of the 2007 NFL draft and spent his rookie season as the team's third-string quarterback behind Carson Palmer and Ryan Fitzpatrick, but did not see any playing time.

Rowe began the 2008 season on the team's practice squad and remained there until being signed by the Seattle Seahawks on December 12.

=== Seattle Seahawks ===
Rowe was signed by the Seattle Seahawks on December 16, 2008 after offensive tackle Walter Jones was placed on injured reserve. He spent the offseason with the Seahawks before being waived on September 5, 2009.

=== New England Patriots ===
Rowe was signed to the New England Patriots practice squad on December 9, 2009. He was re-signed to a future contract on January 12, 2010. Rowe was waived by the Patriots on May 21.
