= Nick Rolovich =

American football player and coach (born 1979)

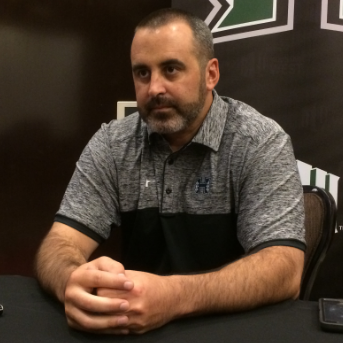
- Rolovich in 2016

California Golden Bears
- Title: Quarterbacks coach and assistant head coach

Personal information
- Born: February 16, 1979 (age 47); Daly City, California, U.S.
- Listed height: 6 ft 1 in (1.85 m)
- Listed weight: 205 lb (93 kg)

Career information
- High school: Marin Catholic (Kentfield, California)
- College: Hawaii
- NFL draft: 2002: undrafted

Career history

Playing
- Denver Broncos (2002–2003)*; Rhein Fire (2002–2003); San Jose SaberCats (2004–2005); Arizona Rattlers (2006); Las Vegas Gladiators (2007)
- * Offseason or practice squad member only

Coaching
- San Marin (CA) HS (2002) Assistant coach; Hawaii (2003–2004) Student assistant; City College of San Francisco (2006–2007) Quarterbacks coach; Hawaii (2008–2011); Quarterbacks coach (2008–2009); Offensive coordinator & quarterbacks coach (2010–2011); Nevada (2012–2015) Offensive coordinator & quarterbacks coach; Hawaii (2016–2019) Head coach; Washington State (2020–2021) Head coach; California (2025–present); Senior offensive assistant (2025); Interim head coach (2025); Assistant head coach & quarterbacks coach (2026–present)

Awards and highlights
- As player: ArenaBowl champion (2004); 2× Junior College All-American (1998–1999); Hula Bowl MVP (2002); As coach: Mountain West West Division (2019); MW Coach of the Year (2019)

Career AFL statistics
- TD–INT: 25–5
- Passing yards: 1,401
- Completion percentage: 55.2
- Passer rating: 97.3
- Stats at ArenaFan.com

Head coaching record
- Career: NCAA: 33–33 (.500)

Nicholas Robert Rolovich (/ˈroʊləvɪtʃ/ ROH-lə-vitch; born February 16, 1979) is an American football coach and former player who is currently the quarterbacks and assistant head coach at California.

Rolovich majored in economics at the University of Hawaii and earned a master's degree from New Mexico Highlands University. He played as a quarterback with the Las Vegas Gladiators in the Arena Football League (AFL).

After a lengthy stint as an assistant coach at his alma mater, Hawaii, Rolovich served as the Rainbow Warriors' head coach from 2016 to 2019. He then served as the head coach of the Washington State Cougars from 2020 to 2021.

In October 2021, after his request for a religious exemption to Washington’s COVID-19 vaccination mandate for state employees was denied, Rolovich was terminated by Washington State University. He later filed a lawsuit against the university, seeking $25 million in damages, alleging wrongful termination and religious discrimination. His lawsuit was unsuccessful, with U.S. District Court Judge Thomas O. Rice ruling in favor of the university.

== Early life ==
Rolovich grew up in Novato, California. He attended Marin Catholic High School in Kentfield, California, where he earned varsity letters in both football and baseball. As a quarterback, he led his football team to two league championships.

== College career ==
=== City College of San Francisco ===
Rolovich was a two-time junior college All-American (1998–1999) at City College of San Francisco, where he led the Rams to the 1999 national championship.

=== University of Hawaii ===
Rolovich was a two-year letterman at the University of Hawaii at Manoa, where he replaced starter and eventual NCAA all-time career passing leader Timmy Chang early in the 2001 season, leading the team to an 8–1 record. Over those nine games, Rolovich threw for 3,361 yards and 34 touchdowns on 233-of-405 passing and ended his college career with three consecutive 500-yard passing games. He also set school single-game records with eight touchdown passes and 543 passing yards in a 72–45 win over BYU on December 8.

His performance placed him tenth in the nation in pass efficiency (105.5) while breaking 19 school passing records and eight total offense records. Rolovich was also named one of the two MVPs of the 2002 Hula Bowl college all-star game.

== Professional football career ==
Rolovich signed with the Denver Broncos on May 18, 2002, after an impressive mini-camp. He rejoined the team the following season before being allocated to the Rhein Fire of NFL Europe. In 2003, Rolovich completed 87 of 149 passes while leading the Fire to World Bowl XI. He connected on 14 of 19 passes for 164 yards and a touchdown in their 35–16 loss to the Frankfurt Galaxy in the championship game.

In 2004 and 2005, Rolovich signed with the San Jose SaberCats of the Arena Football League, serving as a backup to Mark Grieb. He became the first San Jose quarterback other than Grieb to throw a pass in a game since the 2002 season.

Rolovich signed with the Arizona Rattlers on October 31, 2006, but was released after injuring his shoulder in a non-contact scrimmage against Las Vegas on January 16, 2006. Within a week, he was waived. He also had a brief stint with the Chicago Rush in 2006. On April 10, 2007, Rolovich signed with the Las Vegas Gladiators.

== Coaching career ==
While still playing in the AFL, Rolovich served as the quarterbacks coach for his junior college alma mater, the City College of San Francisco Rams, for two years. During his tenure, he coached future quarterbacks Zac Lee and Jeremiah Masoli, who later played at Nebraska and Oregon, respectively.

In 2008, Rolovich retired from professional football and joined the coaching staff of his other alma mater, the Hawaii Warriors, as a full-time quarterbacks coach. In 2010, he was promoted to offensive coordinator.

In 2012, after not being retained by new Warriors head coach Norm Chow, Rolovich was hired as the offensive coordinator and quarterbacks coach for the Nevada Wolf Pack. In 2013, he initially accepted the offensive coordinator position at Temple on Matt Rhule's inaugural staff but backed out on January 9, 2013, after Nevada doubled his salary to $240,000.

=== Hawaii (2016–19) ===
On November 27, 2015, Rolovich was hired as the head football coach at the University of Hawaii, replacing Norm Chow and interim head coach Chris Naeole.

In his first season, Hawaii finished the regular season 6–7 but received their first bowl invitation since 2010, earning a spot in the Hawaii Bowl, where they defeated Middle Tennessee 52–35.

In 2017, the team struggled, finishing 3–9, in part due to injuries to key players, including wide receiver John Ursua.

In 2018, Rolovich shifted from a balanced spread offense to the pass-heavy run and shoot offense, which had been successfully implemented by June Jones during Rolovich's playing days at Hawaii. The offensive shift helped Hawaii finish 8–6, though they lost to Louisiana Tech 31–14 in the Hawaii Bowl.

In 2019, Hawaii opened the season with wins against Pac-12 opponents Arizona and Oregon State before falling to No. 23 Washington. The team clinched a berth in the Mountain West Championship Game with a 14–11 victory over San Diego State on November 23, 2019. After leading Hawaii to a 10-win season and a division title, Rolovich was named the Mountain West Coach of the Year.

=== Washington State (2020–2021) ===
On January 13, 2020, Nick Rolovich was announced as the new head coach of Washington State University, replacing Mike Leach, who had departed to take the head coaching job at Mississippi State.

During the COVID-19 pandemic, student-athletes in the Pac-12 Conference formed a unity group advocating for fair treatment, including COVID-19 safety protocols and racial equality messages, under the threat of opting out of the fall season with the hashtag #WeAreUnited. On August 2, 2020, Washington State wide receiver Kassidy Woods alleged that Rolovich threatened his standing on the team after Woods expressed support for the movement. Woods was subsequently removed from team chats and told to clear out his locker.

Woods released an audio recording of his conversation with Rolovich to the Dallas Morning News, in which Rolovich appeared understanding of Woods opting out due to COVID-19 concerns but remained critical of the unity group. Rolovich later stated that the conversation had taken place before the #WeAreUnited group's official article was released. Washington State spokesman Bill Stephens clarified that Woods had not lost his scholarship or been dismissed from the team. ESPN further reported that no players had been cut but that those who opted out due to safety concerns were not permitted to participate in team activities.

In April 2021, Washington State University became aware of Rolovich's vaccine skepticism when he met with Dr. Guy Palmer, a professor of pathology and infectious diseases. According to Palmer, Rolovich raised concerns common among vaccine skeptics, including references to SV40, a contaminant in polio vaccines from the late 1950s that was not present in COVID-19 vaccines. On July 21, 2021, Rolovich announced that he had chosen not to receive a COVID-19 vaccine, preventing him from attending Pac-12 media day.

On October 18, 2021, Rolovich, along with defensive tackles coach Ricky Logo, cornerbacks coach John Richardson, quarterbacks coach Craig Stutzmann, and offensive line coach Mark Weber, was fired for failing to comply with Washington's COVID-19 vaccine mandate for state employees.

In September 2021, Stutzmann's younger brother Billy Ray, who had previously worked under Rolovich at Hawaii, was also dismissed from his position as an offensive assistant at the US Naval Academy for refusing to receive a COVID-19 vaccine.

Rolovich lost his case with the federal district court in January 2025, and later that year he filed an appeal with the Ninth Circuit Court of Appeals with the assistance of the Becket Fund for Religious Liberty. The United States Department of Justice filed an amicus brief in favor of his appeal, which will be heard sometime in 2026.

Rolovich compiled a record of 5–6 with the Cougars.

=== Seattle Sea Dragons ===
On September 14, 2023, Seattle Sea Dragons head coach Jim Haslett announced that Nick Rolovich would become the team's offensive coordinator for the 2024 season. However, on December 31, 2023, reports emerged that the Sea Dragons would not be included in the merger between the XFL and USFL to form the United Football League (UFL), effectively disbanding the team.

=== California (2025–present) ===
On December 13, 2024, California Golden Bears head coach Justin Wilcox announced the hiring of Nick Rolovich as a senior offensive assistant. Upon Wilcox's firing on November 23, 2025, general manager Ron Rivera announced Rolovich would be the interim head coach for Cal's last home game against SMU and its bowl game. Under new head coach Tosh Lupoi, Rolovich will continue as assistant head coach and quarterbacks coach with the Bears.

== Notable players coached ==
=== As assistant coach ===
- Trevor Davis – Former Hawaiʻi wide receiver (2011–2012). Drafted 163rd overall in the 2016 NFL draft by the Green Bay Packers.
- Joel Bitonio – Former offensive lineman for Nevada (2009–2013). Drafted 35th overall in the 2014 NFL draft by the Cleveland Browns. 7× Pro Bowl selection (2018–2024), 5× All-Pro selection (3× Second-Team: 2018–2020; 2× First-Team: 2021, 2022).

=== As head coach ===
- Marcus Kemp – Former Hawaiʻi wide receiver (2014–2017). Signed by the Kansas City Chiefs as an undrafted free agent in 2017. Won Super Bowl LIV and LVII with Kansas City. In his NFL career, he is credited with 4 receptions for 42 yards.
- Leo Koloamatangi – Former center for Hawaiʻi. Signed by the Detroit Lions as an undrafted free agent in 2017, but did not appear in any regular season games.
- Jahlani Tavai – Former linebacker for Hawaiʻi (2014–2018). Drafted 43rd overall in the 2019 NFL draft by the Detroit Lions. As of 2026, he is currently active on the Jacksonville Jaguars roster.
- John Ursua – Former wide receiver for Hawaiʻi (2016–2018). Drafted 236th overall in the 2019 NFL draft by the Seattle Seahawks. In his NFL career, he is credited with 1 reception for 11 yards.
- Cole McDonald – Former quarterback for Hawaiʻi (2016–2019). Drafted 224th overall in the 2020 NFL draft by the Tennessee Titans. He was released during the pre-season.

== Coaching style ==
=== Offensive philosophy ===
During his stint as offensive coordinator at Hawaii, Rolovich used the run and shoot offense that June Jones had run when Rolovich was the team's starting quarterback. As the offensive coordinator, he made adjustments to the offense so that it could be run out of the pistol formation, creating opportunities for the quarterback to be a second runner. This led to an increase in success in the running game. When he became the offensive coordinator at Nevada, he ran the pistol offense that longtime Nevada head coach Chris Ault had popularized. When he was named head coach at Hawaii, he was the de facto offensive coordinator with Brian Smith and Craig Stutzmann named running game coordinator and passing game coordinator for one season before naming Smith the offensive coordinator for the 2017 season. After running a balanced spread offense for the first two years, he switched back to the run and shoot. With the rise in popularity of the run-pass option (RPO), Rolovich once again made adjustments to the run and shoot offense so that the quarterback of the offense could run RPO plays.

=== Personality ===
Rolovich is known for his zany personality; he brought a tarot card reader, a Britney Spears impersonator, and an Elvis Presley impersonator to Mountain West Conference Media Days during his head coaching days at Hawaii. During the COVID-19 pandemic, Rolovich went around Washington State University's Pullman campus on a bicycle FaceTimeing a recruit with a phone taped to his bike helmet to show the recruit what Pullman and the campus looked like.

== Personal life ==
Rolovich is married to Analea Donovan, his college sweetheart from Maui. They have four children.

== Head coaching record ==
Year	Team	Overall	Conference	Standing	Bowl/playoffs
Hawaii Rainbow Warriors (Mountain West Conference) (2016–2019)
2016	Hawaii	7–7	4–4	2nd (West)	W Hawaii
2017	Hawaii	3–9	1–7	T–5th (West)	
2018	Hawaii	8–6	5–3	T–2nd (West)	L Hawaii
2019	Hawaii	10–5	5–3	T–1st (West)	W Hawaii
Hawaii:		28–27	15–17		
Washington State Cougars (Pac-12 Conference) (2020–2021)
2020	Washington State	1–3	1–3	T–5th (North)	
2021	Washington State	4–3 (Note: Rolovich was fired after seven games)	3–2		
Washington State:		5–6	4–5		
California Golden Bears (Atlantic Coast Conference) (2025)
2025	California	1–1 (Note: Rolovich served as California's interim coach for two games after Justin Wilcox was fired)	1–0	T–7th	L Hawaii
California:		1–1	1–0		
Total:		34–34			
National championship Conference title Conference division title or championship game berth
