= 2016 Hawaii Rainbow Warriors football team =

American college football season

2016 Hawaii Rainbow Warriors football

Hawaii Bowl champion

Hawaii Bowl, W 52–35 vs. Middle Tennessee
- Conference: Mountain West Conference
- West Division
- Record: 7–7 (4–4 MW)
- Head coach: Nick Rolovich (1st season)
- Offensive coordinator: Brian Smith (1st season)
- Offensive scheme: Spread option
- Defensive coordinator: Kevin Lempa (4th season)
- Base defense: 4–3
- Home stadium: Aloha Stadium

2016 Mountain West Conference football standings
| | Conf. | | | Overall |
| Team | W | | L | W | | L |
|---|---|---|---|---|---|---|
Mountain Division
| Wyoming xy | 6 | – | 2 | 8 | – | 6 |
| Boise State x | 6 | – | 2 | 10 | – | 3 |
| New Mexico x | 6 | – | 2 | 9 | – | 4 |
| Air Force | 5 | – | 3 | 10 | – | 3 |
| Colorado State | 5 | – | 3 | 7 | – | 6 |
| Utah State | 1 | – | 7 | 3 | – | 9 |
West Division
| No. 25 San Diego State xy$ | 6 | – | 2 | 11 | – | 3 |
| Hawaii | 4 | – | 4 | 7 | – | 7 |
| Nevada | 3 | – | 5 | 5 | – | 7 |
| San Jose State | 3 | – | 5 | 4 | – | 8 |
| UNLV | 3 | – | 5 | 4 | – | 8 |
| Fresno State | 0 | – | 8 | 1 | – | 11 |
Championship: San Diego State 27, Wyoming 24
$ – Conference champion; x – Division champion/co-champions; y – Championship game participant; Rankings from AP Poll

The 2016 Hawaii Rainbow Warriors football team represented the University of Hawaiʻi at Mānoa in the 2016 NCAA Division I FBS football season. The team was led by first year head coach Nick Rolovich, who replaced Norm Chow. They played their home games at Aloha Stadium. They were members of the Mountain West Conference in the West Division.

With their 52–16 loss to Boise State on November 12, the team clinched their sixth straight losing regular season, a new school record. However, with a 14–13 victory over Fresno State the following week, they won their fourth conference game, their most since joining the Mountain West. It also snapped a string of five straight losing conference seasons. In addition, with the win against UMass, Hawaii became bowl eligible for the first time since 2010, because of the lack of eligible teams.

== Schedule ==
| Date | Time | Opponent | Site | TV | Result | Attendance |
|---|---|---|---|---|---|---|
| August 26 | 4:00 pm (Note: Game date and time are listed in Hawaii Time. Sydney is on Australian Eastern Standard Time, which at game time was 20 hours ahead of Hawaii Time.) | vs. California* | (Australia) ANZ Stadium; Sydney, Australia (Sydney Cup) | ESPN | L 31–51 | 61,247 |
| September 3 | 6:00 am | at No. 7 Michigan* | Michigan Stadium; Ann Arbor, MI | ESPN | L 3–63 | 110,222 |
| September 10 | 6:00 pm | UT Martin* | Aloha Stadium; Honolulu, HI | Oceanic PPV | W 41–36 | 23,900 |
| September 17 | 4:45 pm | at Arizona* | Arizona Stadium; Tucson, AZ | P12N | L 28–47 | 50,116 |
| October 1 | 6:00 pm | Nevada | Aloha Stadium; Honolulu, HI | Oceanic PPV | W 38–17 | 23,593 |
| October 8 | 11:30 am | at San Jose State | CEFCU Stadium; San Jose, CA (rivalry) | Oceanic PPV | W 34–17 | 16,837 |
| October 15 | 6:00 pm | UNLV^{†} | Aloha Stadium; Honolulu, HI | Oceanic PPV | L 38–41 | 31,287 |
| October 22 | 9:00 am | at Air Force | Falcon Stadium; Colorado Springs, CO (rivalry) | Oceanic PPV | W 34–27 ^{2OT} | 29,132 |
| October 29 | 6:00 pm | New Mexico | Aloha Stadium; Honolulu, HI | Oceanic PPV | L 21–28 | 23,964 |
| November 5 | 2:00 pm | at San Diego State | Qualcomm Stadium; San Diego, CA | CBSSN | L 0–55 | 41,644 |
| November 12 | 2:00 pm | No. 24 Boise State | Aloha Stadium; Honolulu, HI | CBSSN | L 16–52 | 22,731 |
| November 19 | 2:00 pm | at Fresno State | Bulldog Stadium; Fresno, CA (rivalry) | Oceanic PPV | W 14–13 | 26,951 |
| November 26 | 6:00 pm | UMass* | Aloha Stadium; Honolulu, HI | Oceanic PPV | W 46–40 | 22,739 |
| December 24 | 3:00 pm | Middle Tennessee* | Aloha Stadium; Honolulu, HI (Hawaii Bowl) | ESPN | W 52–35 | 23,175 |
*Non-conference game; ^{†}Homecoming; Rankings from AP Poll released prior to the game; All times are in Hawaii time

All attendances at Aloha Stadium are in tickets sold.

== Game summaries ==
=== vs California ===
| | 1 | 2 | 3 | 4 | Total |
|---|---|---|---|---|---|
| Rainbow Warriors | 14 | 0 | 10 | 7 | 31 |
| Golden Bears | 17 | 17 | 7 | 10 | 51 |

Calling the game for ESPN: Allen Bestwick, Mike Bellotti (from Bristol) and Fox Sports Australia's NRL host Warren Smith (live on-site). It was produced by Foxtel.

=== at #7 Michigan ===
| | 1 | 2 | 3 | 4 | Total |
|---|---|---|---|---|---|
| Rainbow Warriors | 0 | 0 | 0 | 3 | 3 |
| #7 Wolverines | 14 | 21 | 21 | 7 | 63 |

Calling the game for ESPN: Mike Patrick, Ed Cunningham, and Dr. Jerry Punch. The 110,222 in attendance is the largest crowd to ever attend a University of Hawaii football game. The previous record for attendance was 107,145 during a game against Ohio State at the Ohio Stadium on September 12, 2015.

=== Tennessee–Martin ===
| | 1 | 2 | 3 | 4 | Total |
|---|---|---|---|---|---|
| Skyhawks | 10 | 7 | 7 | 12 | 36 |
| Rainbow Warriors | 7 | 7 | 14 | 13 | 41 |

=== at Arizona ===
| | 1 | 2 | 3 | 4 | Total |
|---|---|---|---|---|---|
| Rainbow Warriors | 7 | 0 | 7 | 14 | 28 |
| Wildcats | 20 | 14 | 10 | 3 | 47 |

=== Nevada ===
| | 1 | 2 | 3 | 4 | Total |
|---|---|---|---|---|---|
| Wolf Pack | 0 | 3 | 0 | 14 | 17 |
| Rainbow Warriors | 3 | 14 | 21 | 0 | 38 |

=== at San Jose State ===
| | 1 | 2 | 3 | 4 | Total |
|---|---|---|---|---|---|
| Rainbow Warriors | 3 | 21 | 0 | 10 | 34 |
| Spartans | 3 | 7 | 7 | 0 | 17 |

=== UNLV ===
| | 1 | 2 | 3 | 4 | Total |
|---|---|---|---|---|---|
| Rebels | 7 | 14 | 3 | 17 | 41 |
| Rainbow Warriors | 7 | 14 | 3 | 14 | 38 |

=== at Air Force ===
| | 1 | 2 | 3 | 4 | OT | 2OT | Total |
|---|---|---|---|---|---|---|---|
| Rainbow Warriors | 0 | 10 | 3 | 7 | 7 | 7 | 34 |
| Falcons | 7 | 0 | 6 | 7 | 7 | 0 | 27 |

=== New Mexico ===
| | 1 | 2 | 3 | 4 | Total |
|---|---|---|---|---|---|
| Lobos | 14 | 0 | 7 | 7 | 28 |
| Rainbow Warriors | 0 | 14 | 0 | 7 | 21 |

=== at San Diego State ===
| | 1 | 2 | 3 | 4 | Total |
|---|---|---|---|---|---|
| Rainbow Warriors | 0 | 0 | 0 | 0 | 0 |
| Aztecs | 14 | 13 | 14 | 14 | 55 |

On the call for CBS Sports Network: Rich Waltz, Eric Davis, and Cassie McKinney.

=== #24 Boise State ===
| | 1 | 2 | 3 | 4 | Total |
|---|---|---|---|---|---|
| #24 Broncos | 14 | 21 | 10 | 7 | 52 |
| Rainbow Warriors | 0 | 3 | 3 | 10 | 16 |

On the call for CBS Sports Network: Rich Waltz, Adam Archuleta, and Cassie McKinney.

=== at Fresno State ===
| | 1 | 2 | 3 | 4 | Total |
|---|---|---|---|---|---|
| Rainbow Warriors | 0 | 7 | 0 | 7 | 14 |
| Bulldogs | 0 | 7 | 3 | 3 | 13 |

=== Massachusetts ===
| | 1 | 2 | 3 | 4 | Total |
|---|---|---|---|---|---|
| Minutemen | 3 | 10 | 13 | 14 | 40 |
| Rainbow Warriors | 10 | 14 | 9 | 13 | 46 |

=== Middle Tennessee–Hawaii Bowl ===
| | 1 | 2 | 3 | 4 | Total |
|---|---|---|---|---|---|
| Rainbow Warriors | 14 | 21 | 10 | 7 | 52 |
| Blue Raiders | 14 | 7 | 7 | 7 | 35 |

Calling the game for ESPN: Chris Cotter, Mark May, and Maria Taylor.

== Personnel ==
=== Coaching staff ===
| Name | Position | Seasons at Hawaii | Alma mater |
|---|---|---|---|
| Nick Rolovich | Head coach | 7 | Hawaii (2004) |
| Kevin Lempa | Defensive coordinator | 4 | Southern Connecticut State (1974) |
| Mayur Chaudhari | Special teams coordinator / tight ends coach | 1 | UC Davis (2002) |
| Sean Duggan | Linebackers Coach | 1 | Boston College (2014) |
| Abe Elimimian | Secondary Coach | 2 | Hawaii (2004) |
| Kefense Hynson | Wide receivers Coach | 1 | Willamette (2003) |
| Chris Naeole | Offensive line Coach | 4 | Colorado (1997) |
| Brian Smith | Offensive coordinator / running backs coach | 6 | Hawaii (2005) |
| Craig Stutzmann | Pass Game Coordinator / quarterbacks coach | 2 | Hawaii (2002) |
| Legi Suiaunoa | Defensive line Coach | 1 | Nevada (2002) |
| Bubba Reynolds | Strength and conditioning | 1 | Humboldt State (2011) |

=== Roster ===
2016 Hawaii Rainbow Warriors Football
| Quarterback: 11 Ikaika Woolsey – (redshirt) senior (6'1, 215); 13 Cole McDonald – freshman (6'4, 205); 15 Aaron Zwahlen – (redshirt) freshman (6'3, 200); 16 Beau Reilly – (redshirt) sophomore (6'6, 190); 17 Cole Brownholtz – sophomore (6'4, 210); 18 Kyle Gallup – freshman (6'2, 210); 19 Dru Brown – sophomore (6'0, 200); Tailback: 4 Steven Lakalaka – senior (5'10, 210); 6 Paul Harris – (redshirt) senior (5'11, 190); 21 Freddie Holly III – freshman (6'0, 210); 22 Diocemy Saint Juste – (redshirt) junior (5'8, 195); 29 Genta Ito – junior (5'8, 195); 33 Melvin Davis – senior (6'2, 235); 47 Kaiwi Chung – (redshirt) sophomore (5'11, 240) (FB); 48 Ryan Tuiasoa – (redshirt) junior (5'11, 210); Wide receiver: 9 Devan Stubblefield – (redshirt) sophomore (6'0, 190); 10 Makoa Camanse-Stevens – senior (6'4, 205); 12 Keelan Ewaliko – (redshirt) junior (5'11, 200); 14 Marcus Kemp – senior (6'4, 200); 23 Dylan Collie – (redshirt) sophomore (5'10, 175); 24 Samson Anguay – senior (5'7, 170); 30 Davine Tullis – freshman (6'1, 195); 31 Frank Abreu – (redshirt) junior (6'0, 200); 34 Nic Tom – freshman (5'9, 180); 35 Don'Yeh Patterson – (redshirt) sophomore (6'0, 175); 45 John Ursua – (redshirt) freshman (5'10, 165); 80 Ammon Barker – (redshirt) junior (6'4, 215); 81 Kalakaua Timoteo – freshman (6'1, 190); 84 Isaiah Bernard – senior (6'1, 190); 88 Kalei Letoto – senior (5'10, 190); Marcus Armstrong-Brown – junior (6'3, 195); Tight end: 7 Metuisela `Unga – junior (6'5, 240); 82 Davasyia Hagger – (redshirt) junior (6'6, 230); 85 Andrew James-Ho – (redshirt) junior (6'2, 240); 86 Dakota Torres – (redshirt) sophomore (6'2, 245); 95 Sione Kauhi – (redshirt) freshman (6'5, 250) | Offensive lineman: 50 Dejon Allen – (redshirt) junior (6'3, 290); 51 John Wa'a – (redshirt) junior (6'4, 315); 56 Elijah Tupai – (redshirt) junior (6'4, 315); 57 J.R. Hensley – (redshirt) freshman (6'5, 310); 60 Chris Posa – junior (6'4, 290); 64 Fred Ulu-Perry – sophomore (6'2, 305); 65 Asotui Eli – (redshirt) sophomore (6'4, 315); 66 Eperone Moananu – sophomore (6'2, 290); 67 Josh Hauani'o – freshman (6'4, 300); 70 Luke Clements – (redshirt) sophomore (6'5, 300); 71 King James Taylor – freshman (6'4, 305); 72 Matt Norman – (redshirt) junior (6'5, 270); 73 Austin Webb – (redshirt) freshman (6'8, 310); 74 RJ Hollis – (redshirt) senior (6'4, 295); 78 Leo Koloamatangi – (redshirt) senior (6'5, 310); Defensive lineman: 3 David Manoa – (redshirt) junior (6'3, 240); 5 Makani Kema-Kaleiwahea – (redshirt) senior (6'3, 240); 8 Penitito Faalologo – (redshirt) junior (5'11, 300); 45 Tevarua Eldridge – (redshirt) sophomore (6'2, 230); 49 Manly Williams – (redshirt) freshman (6'2, 220); 63 Taaga Tuulima – freshman (6'2, 280); 70 Joey Nu'uanu-Kuhi'iki – freshman (6'3, 260); 75 Kory Rasmussen – (redshirt) senior (6'2, 295); 77 Alesana Sunia – freshman (6'3, 305); 89 Cole Carter – freshman (6'4, 265); 91 Samiuela Akoteu – (redshirt) freshman (6'2, 320); 92 Maxwell Hendrie – freshman (6'4, 245); 93 Isaac Liva – freshman (6'5, 230); 94 Ka'aumoana Gifford – (redshirt) sophomore (6'4, 275); 96 Kaimana Padello – freshman (6'0, 205); 97 Meffy Koloamatangi – (redshirt) junior (6'5, 240); 98 Viane Moala – freshman (6'7, 270); 99 Zeno Choi – sophomore (6'3, 260); Netane Muti – freshman (6'4, 275); Long snappers: 62 Brodie Nakama – senior (5'9, 225) | Linebacker: 2 Jerrol Garcia-Williams – (redshirt) senior (6'2, 230); 10 Jeremiah Pritchard – freshman (6'0, 210); 22 Ikem Okeke – freshman (6'0, 220); 27 Solomon Matautia – (redshirt) freshman (6'1, 230); 31 Jahlani Tavai – (redshirt) sophomore (6'4, 235); 38 Malachi Mageo – (redshirt) sophomore (6'2, 210); 40 Dany Mulanga – (redshirt) sophomore (6'3, 200); 41 Noah Borden – sophomore (6'1, 215) (+LS); 44 Russell Williams Jr. – junior (6'1, 230); 52 Dalton Gouveia – (redshirt) freshman (6'1, 225); 53 Dayton Furuta – (redshirt) freshman (5'11, 230); 54 La'akea Look – freshman (6'0, 225); 58 Rashaan Falemalu – (redshirt) sophomore (6'1, 230); 59 Max Broman – (redshirt) junior (6'1, 220); 88 Tumua Tuinei – (redshirt) sophomore (5'9, 210); Defensive back: 11 Jamal Mayo – (redshirt) senior (5'11, 185); 13 Keala Santiago – freshman (6'0, 200); 15 Daniel Lewis Jr. – junior (5'11, 180); 16 Kalen Hicks – freshman (6'3, 200); 18 Rojesterman Farris II – (redshirt) freshman (6'1, 180); 19 Jalen Rogers – (redshirt) senior (6'1, 200); 20 Zach Wilson – freshman (5'11, 170); 21 Damien Packer – (redshirt) senior (5'11, 210); 24 Mykal Tolliver – freshman (6'0, 175); 25 Austin Borengasser – (redshirt) freshman (6'2, 205); 26 Dejaun Butler – senior (5'11, 180); 28 Cameron Hayes – (redshirt) freshman (5'11, 180); 33 Tyrus Tuiasosopo – freshman (6'4, 180); 37 Austin Gerard – (redshirt) junior (6'1, 195); 39 Trayvon Henderson – (redshirt) junior (6'0, 200); 42 Scheyenne Sanitoa – freshman (6'0, 200); Eugene Ford – freshman (6'2, 185); Placekicker: 1 Rigoberto Sanchez – senior (6'1, 190) (+P); 69 Stephen Yaffe – freshman (5'11, 185); Punter: 46 Alex Trifonovitch – (redshirt) freshman (6'1, 180); 83 Stan Gaudion – freshman (6'3, 210) |
