= Run and shoot offense =

American football offensive scheme

The run and shoot offense (also known as Run N' Shoot) is an offensive system for American football which emphasizes receiver motion and on-the-fly adjustments of receivers' routes in response to different defenses. It was conceived by former high school coach Glenn "Tiger" Ellison and refined and popularized by former Portland State offensive coordinator Mouse Davis.

== Description ==
The run and shoot system uses a formation consisting of one running back and usually four wide receivers. This system makes extensive use of receiver motion (having a receiver suddenly change position by running left or right, parallel to the line of scrimmage, just before the ball is snapped), both to create advantageous mismatches with the opposing defensive players and to help reveal what coverage the defense is using. If a defender stays with the motioning receiver, it would imply man-to-man coverage.

The basic idea behind the run and shoot is a flexible offense that adjusts "on the fly," with the receivers changing their routes based on the defensive coverage and play of the defenders covering them. The quarterback then not only reads the defensive coverage to determine where to throw the ball, but must also read the defenders to determine the probable route his receivers may run. As a result, the offense is considered complex and difficult to implement due to the intelligence and communication required between quarterback and receivers. The offense also typically relies heavily on the pass, sometimes throwing the ball upwards of 65 to 75% in a game or over the course of a season.

In the purest form of the offense, the proper complement would consist of two wide receivers lined up on the outside edges of the formation and two "slotbacks" (wide receivers who line up one step back from the line of scrimmage, so as not to be considered "covered" and thus ineligible) lined up just outside and behind the two offensive tackles. The formation would look very similar to the Flexbone Offense formation.

== Formation history ==
The original inventor of the run and shoot, Glenn "Tiger" Ellison, first started out with a formation that overloaded the left side of the offensive line for his scrambling quarterback. He called it "The Lonesome Polecat".

In many cases, the receivers used were shorter (often ranging from 5'7" to 5'11" in height) but faster, so they could outrun their defender more easily. By incorporating a 4th wide receiver instead of a bigger tight end, defenses (usually a nickel defense or dime defense) would often substitute a smaller defensive back in place of a linebacker to cover that 4th wide receiver. Thus, the defense would often give up a big weight advantage. Running backs were usually bigger in weight, ranging from 210 to 230 pounds, due to the requirement of blocking. Since the running backs were bigger, many of the runs were designed to go inside or behind the offensive guard to take advantage of the two smaller defensive backs trying to tackle them instead of bigger linebackers. Due to the spacing of the wide receivers, this also made the interior of the field less packed with defenders, allowing for a blocking advantage for the offensive line.

A lot of the core concepts involved option routes where receivers would make a decision based on the defender. One example would be for the Y receiver to run deep if the free safety was in the middle of the field or to run a post pattern inside if the safety was not there. A second example would be for an outside receiver to go deep if he could beat his defender with speed, or stop and hook back to the quarterback if he could not. A key route concept that has continued in today's modern passing game is the Switch where the two outside receivers switch places as they run down the field (the outside receiver runs inside, the inside receiver runs outside). In the early days of the offense under Mouse Davis, the offense was more reliant on a vertical passing attack going down the field and being aggressive.

Many of the National Football League teams that used the run and shoot in the early 1990s used true wide receivers in all four receiving positions.

=== Variations ===
Originally, the run and shoot was set up so the quarterback would be under center with the running back lined up a few yards behind him. Later, during his tenure with the University of Hawaii, June Jones used quarterback Colt Brennan out of the shotgun. In this case the running back is usually offset to the right or left of the quarterback.

Also at Hawaii, Nick Rolovich tweaked the formation to run out of the pistol, thus creating an opportunity for a mobile quarterback to become a second running back. This led to increased success in the running game.

Another formation that can often be seen with the run and shoot is the trips formation, where three wide receivers are situated to the right or left side of the line of scrimmage. Most of the time, this formation will be created out of motion when the W or Y receiver moves to the opposite side of the formation helping force defenses to declare whether they are in man-to-man coverage or zone defense.

== Professional and collegiate notability with offense ==
The Portland State Vikings under head coach Mouse Davis went 42–24 in his tenure installing the offense and putting the system on the map. Quarterback Neil Lomax set many records including career NCAA passing yards.

In 1984 the offense came on to the scene nationally in the USFL with the Houston Gamblers. Quarterback Jim Kelly, under offensive coordinator Mouse Davis, would set the professional football passing yard record in a season with 5,219 yards.

The South Carolina Gamecocks football team used the offense to varied success in the mid-late 1980's behind quarterback Todd Ellis and receivers Sterling Sharpe, Robert Brooks, among others. It was considered some of the Gamecocks most successful years to that point.

The 1989 Houston Cougars football team demonstrated the scoring potential of the run and shoot offense as quarterback Andre Ware set 26 NCAA records and won the Heisman Trophy while the #14 ranked Cougars finished the season 9–2. The Cougars were disallowed from having its football games televised or playing in a Bowl Game that season due to NCAA sanctions imposed some years earlier. The following two seasons Houston quarterback David Klingler continued the success of the run and shoot throwing for 9,430 yards and 91 touchdowns, including 716 yards and 11 touchdown passes in a single game which were all records. Quarterbacks Ware and Klingler were both drafted in the NFL first round. The success of Houston's run and shoot offense along with the inability of its record setting quarterbacks to translate their success into the NFL led to the label of such quarterbacks in this system being "system quarterbacks".

At the University of Hawaii, June Jones went 76–41 including seeing quarterback Timmy Chang set a record for most NCAA completions and passing yards in 2004 and quarterback Colt Brennan set a record for touchdown passes in 2006 with 58. In 2018, Hawaii brought back the run and shoot offense under former Hawaii QB and head coach Nick Rolovich, and again under Chang as the head coach in 2024, both times transitioning out of the spread offense.

=== NFL teams that used the Run and Shoot offense ===
Start	End	Team	Head coach	Offensive coordinator
1987	1994	Houston Oilers	Jerry Glanville and Jack Pardee	June Jones and Kevin Gilbride
1989	1994	Detroit Lions	Wayne Fontes	Mouse Davis, Dave Levy and Dan Henning
1991	1996	Atlanta Falcons	Jerry Glanville and June Jones	June Jones
1997	1998	San Diego Chargers	Kevin Gilbride and June Jones	Mike Sheppard

=== NCAA teams that used the Run and Shoot offense ===
Start	End	Team	Head coach	Offensive coordinator
1974	1980	Portland State Vikings	Mouse Davis	
1975	1988	Franklin College (Indiana)	Stewart Faught	
1981	1981	California Golden Bears	Roger Theder	Mouse Davis
1986	1991	College of the Holy Cross	Mark Duffner	
1986	1988	South Carolina Gamecocks	Joe Morrison	Al Groh and Charlie Weis
1987	1989	Houston Cougars	Jack Pardee	John Jenkins
1988	1989	Boston University Terriers		Chris Palmer
1990	1991	Georgetown Tigers		Stewart Faught
1990	1992	Houston Cougars	John Jenkins	
1991	1993	Hofstra Pride	Joe Gardi	Manny Matsakis
1992	1996	Maryland Terrapins	Mark Duffner	Dan Dorazio
1995	1998	Emporia State Hornets	Manny Matsakis	
1999	2007	Hawaii Warriors	June Jones	
2008	2011	Hawaii Warriors	Greg McMackin	Nick Rolovich
2008	2014	SMU Mustangs	June Jones	June Jones, Hal Mumme and Dan Morrison
2018	2019	Hawaii Rainbow Warriors	Nick Rolovich	Brian Smith and Craig Stutzmann
2020	2021	Washington State Cougars	Nick Rolovich	Brian Smith and Craig Stutzmann
2021	2021	Washington State Cougars	Jake Dickert (interim)	Brian Smith
2024	present	Hawaii Rainbow Warriors	Timmy Chang	

=== Professional Spring League teams that used the Run and Shoot offense ===
Start	End	League	Team	Head coach	Offensive Coordinator
1984	1985	USFL	Houston Gamblers	Jack Pardee	Mouse Davis and John Jenkins
1985	1985	USFL	Denver Gold	Mouse Davis	June Jones
2020	2020	XFL	Houston Roughnecks	June Jones	Chris Miller
2020	2021	TSL	Conquerors	Jerry Glanville	June Jones and AJ Smith
2023	2023	XFL	Seattle Sea Dragons	Jim Haslett	June Jones
2023	2023	XFL	Houston Roughnecks	Wade Phillips	AJ Smith
2024	2024	UFL	San Antonio Brahmas	Wade Phillips	AJ Smith
