= Andre Ware =

American football player and analyst (born 1968)

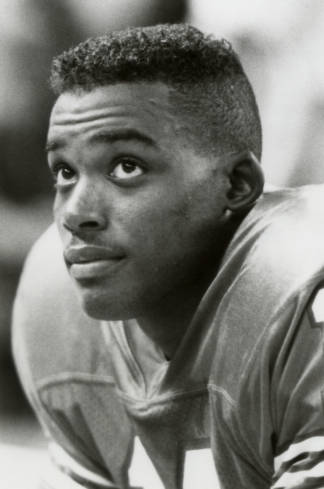
- Ware with the Houston Cougars

No. 11, 10, 1
- Position: Quarterback

Personal information
- Born: July 31, 1968 (age 58); Galveston, Texas, U.S.
- Listed height: 6 ft 2 in (1.88 m)
- Listed weight: 205 lb (93 kg)

Career information
- High school: Dickinson (Dickinson, Texas)
- College: Houston (1987–1989)
- NFL draft: 1990: 1st round, 7th overall pick

Career history
- Detroit Lions (1990–1993); Minnesota Vikings (1994)*; Jacksonville Jaguars (1995)*; Ottawa Rough Riders (1995); BC Lions (1996); Toronto Argonauts (1997); Berlin Thunder (1999); Oakland Raiders (1999)*
- * Offseason or practice squad member only

Awards and highlights
- Grey Cup champion (1997); Heisman Trophy (1989); Consensus All-American (1989); SWC Offensive Player of the Year (1989); First-team All-SWC (1989); Second-team All-SWC (1988); Houston Cougars No. 11 retired

Career NFL statistics
- Passing attempts: 161
- Passing completions: 83
- Completion percentage: 51.6%
- TD–INT: 5–8
- Passing yards: 1,112
- Passer rating: 63.5
- Rushing yards: 217
- Stats at Pro Football Reference

Career CFL statistics
- Passing attempts: 249
- Passing completions: 134
- Completion percentage: 58.8%
- TD–INT: 10–10
- Passing yards: 1,542
- College Football Hall of Fame

Andre Trevor Ware (born July 31, 1968) is an American sports analyst and commentator, and a former professional football player. He played professionally as a quarterback in the National Football League (NFL), Canadian Football League (CFL) and NFL Europe. Ware played college football for the Houston Cougars, winning the Heisman Trophy and Davey O'Brien Award in 1989. He was the first black quarterback to receive the Heisman. In the 1990 NFL draft, Ware was selected in the first round by the Detroit Lions with the seventh overall pick. He was inducted into the College Football Hall of Fame in 2004.

== College career ==
Ware grew up in the Galveston, Texas region, hoping to play football at the University of Texas. He said "I was going to Texas. All they had to do was lie to me and tell me I was going to play quarterback once I got there. Thank goodness they told me the truth [that] they were going to move me to defense". After graduating from Dickinson High School, Ware instead played at the University of Houston, where he won the Heisman Trophy in 1989, along with the Davey O'Brien Award, the latter award given to the most outstanding college quarterback of the year. That season - his junior year - averaging 52 passes per contest (365-of-578, 63.1%), he threw for 4,699 yards (427.18 yds/g or 127 yds/quarter), 46 touchdowns, and set 27 NCAA records over the span of 11 games, seven of which he sat during the fourth quarter. Many of the records (including the notable 340 yards/5 TDs in the first quarter and 517 yards/6 TDs thrown in one half, set on October 21, 1989, in a 95–21 rout against the SMU Mustangs) were thanks to the innovative use of the run and shoot offense, which his successor, David Klingler, also used to great effect. The 1989 Cougars were the first FBS team to have a 4,000-yard passer, 1,000-yard rusher, and 1,000-yard receiver in the same season, where they ended the season 9–2 after averaging 624.9 y/g and ranked the #14 team in the nation by the Associated Press, but were on probation, making Ware the only quarterback to win the Heisman while playing for a team on probation. He then declared for the NFL draft, forgoing his senior year.

== Professional football career ==
Ware became the top draft pick of the Detroit Lions in the 1990 NFL draft. Head coach Wayne Fontes overrode the advice of the team's scouting director, who resigned the next day. Ware joined the Lions for the 1990 season, teaming with the previous Heisman Trophy winner from 1988, Barry Sanders. Ware spent four years with Detroit, playing 14 games and starting six: Coach Fontes insisted on starting the oft-injured Rodney Peete, and usually replacing Peete with Erik Kramer when Peete was hurt or played poorly. Fontes generally only played Ware when the Lions were out of the playoffs or already losing a game by a wide margin. Ware's best stretch came late in the 1992 season when the Lions were out of the playoffs: he won two of three games.

In 1994 Ware was signed by the Minnesota Vikings, but was released before the start of the season. He ended up on the roster of the Los Angeles Raiders, but was released after several games without being activated. In 1995, he was signed by the Jacksonville Jaguars, one of the NFL's two expansion teams that year. As a former Heisman Trophy winner, Ware's presence created much local excitement in Jacksonville, but ultimately Ware was cut from the team the week before the regular season began.

It is debated why Ware failed in the NFL despite a prolific college career. While some have argued that Ware's coaches never gave him a fair chance to develop, others have noticed that he was unable to adapt to an offensive system other than the run-and-shoot offense at Houston.

Ware also played in the Canadian Football League with the Ottawa Rough Riders, the BC Lions and the Toronto Argonauts (where he backed up fellow Heisman winner Doug Flutie). He spent five games with the Berlin Thunder, a German NFL Europe team.

== Career statistics ==
Legend
**Bold**	Career high

=== NFL ===
Year	Team	Games			Passing									Rushing					Sacked	
Year	Team	GP	GS	Record	Cmp	Att	Pct	Yds	Y/A	Lng	TD	Int	Rtg	Att	Yds	Y/A	Lng	TD	Sck	Yds
1990	DET	4	1	0–1	13	30	43.4	164	5.5	33	1	2	44.3	7	64	**9.1**	30	0	4	22
1991	DET	1	0	—	0	0	0.0	0	0.0	0	0	0	0.0	4	6	1.5	10	0	0	0
1992	DET	4	3	**2–1**	**50**	**86**	**58.1**	**677**	**7.9**	**59**	**3**	**4**	**75.6**	**20**	**124**	6.2	**32**	0	**16**	**104**
1993	DET	5	2	1–1	20	45	44.4	271	6.0	47	1	2	53.1	7	23	3.3	8	0	7	20
Career		14	6	3–3	83	161	51.6	1,112	6.9	59	5	8	63.5	38	217	5.7	32	0	27	146

=== CFL ===
Year	Team	Games			Passing								Rushing			
Year	Team	GD	GS	Record	Cmp	Att	Pct	Yds	Y/A	TD	Int	Rtg	Att	Yds	Y/A	TD
1995	OTT	7	4	0–4	**70**	**126**	55.6	**759**	6.0	3	**8**	55.0	**20**	**148**	7.4	0
1996	BC	4	4	0–4	49	97	50.5	590	6.1	**5**	2	78.1	14	108	7.7	0
1997	TOR	18	0	—	15	26	**57.7**	193	**7.4**	2	0	**106.7**	6	60	**10.0**	**1**
Career		29	8	0–8	134	249	53.8	1,542	6.2	10	10	69.4	40	316	7.9	1

=== College ===
Year	Team	Games			Passing								Rushing			
Year	Team	GP	GS	Record	Cmp	Att	Pct	Yds	Y/A	TD	Int	Rtg	Att	Yds	Avg	TD
1987	Houston	5	4	1–3	83	140	59.3	996	7.1	4	5	121.3	35	**–58**	**–1.7**	1
1988	Houston	11	5	4–1	212	356	59.6	2,507	7.0	25	8	137.4	35	−48	−1.4	2
1989	Houston	11	11	**9–2**	**365**	**578**	**63.1**	**4,699**	**8.1**	**46**	**15**	**152.5**	**120**	–38	–0.8	**3**
Career		27	20	14–6	660	1,074	61.5	8,202	7.6	75	28	143.4	120	−144	−1.2	6

== Broadcaster ==
Since 2002, Ware has been a part of the Houston Texans' radio broadcast team with Marc Vandermeer.

Since 2003, Ware has been a college football analyst for ESPN. From 2003 until 2008, he called games on ESPN, ESPN2 and ESPN on ABC. In July 2009, ESPN announced that Ware would team up with long-time SEC broadcaster Dave Neal in the fall of 2009 as color commentator for ESPN Regional Television's coverage of Southeastern Conference Football. Ware continued in this role until 2013. From 2014 through 2019, he called games for ESPN's SEC Network, then joined the ESPN College Football Friday Primetime team in 2020.

== Awards and honors ==
- Grey Cup champion (1997)
- Heisman Trophy (1989)
- Davey O'Brien Award (1989)
- UPI Player of the Year (1989)
- Consensus All-American (1989)
- SWC Offensive Player of the Year (1989)
- First-team All-SWC (1989)
- Second-team All-SWC (1988)
- Houston Cougars No. 11 retired
- College Football Hall of Fame (2004)
- Texas Sports Hall of Fame (2011)

== See also ==
- List of NCAA major college football yearly passing leaders
- List of NCAA major college football yearly total offense leaders
- Racial issues faced by black quarterbacks
- List of black quarterbacks
