= System quarterback =

Pejorative American football term

A system quarterback is a quarterback in American football who flourishes under a particular offensive system, specifically one that focuses on passing. The term is often seen as a pejorative, for it implicitly downplays a quarterback's talent or skill by implying that a successful offense is due to a particular scheme or that a quarterback is successful due to his employment under specific circumstances. Russ Lande of Sporting News traced the term's etymology, or at least currency, to the early 1990s, when two University of Houston quarterbacks failed to carry college success into their professional careers. First, Andre Ware, in head coach Jack Pardee and offensive coordinator John Jenkins's run and shoot offense, had a record-setting 1989 season that culminated in a Heisman Trophy. He was the seventh overall pick in the 1990 NFL draft, but did not have success in either the National Football League (NFL) or the Canadian Football League (CFL). David Klingler took over for Ware at UH and was the sixth overall pick in the 1992 NFL draft. He too, failed to find exceptional success in the NFL.

== Usage ==
Recently, the appellation was commonly applied to Texas Tech quarterbacks that operated under former head coach Mike Leach and offensive coordinator Dana Holgorsen's spread offense. In the 2000s, the school had several different quarterbacks that threw in excess of 4,000 yards in a season. According to some pundits, this demonstrated that the quarterback had simply been an interchangeable part in a prolific passing offense. Some Texas Tech quarterbacks, with their college tenure in parentheses, described as such include:

- Sonny Cumbie (2001–2004), threw for 4,742 yards his senior year.
- Graham Harrell (2004–2008), threw for 4,555, 5,705, and 5,111 yards his last three years.
- Cody Hodges (2001–2005), threw for 4,238 yards his senior year.
- Kliff Kingsbury (1998–2002), passed for 4,642 yards his senior year.
- B. J. Symons (2000–2003), threw for 5,336 yards his senior year.

The label is not restricted to Texas Tech, however, and pundits and coaches have referred to players from several other schools as benefiting from systems. In 2007, then Hawaii head coach and offensive coordinator June Jones infamously defended his own alleged system quarterback, Colt Brennan, by making the counter-accusation against Tim Tebow of Florida. Players from schools other than Texas Tech that were described as system quarterbacks include:

- Colt Brennan – Hawaii (2005–2007), under June Jones's run and shoot offense.
- Timmy Chang – Hawaii (2000–2004), under June Jones's run and shoot.
- Chase Daniel – Missouri (2005–2008), under Dave Christensen's spread offense.
- Dennis Dixon – Oregon (2003–2007), under Mike Belloti's spread offense.
- Connor Halliday – Washington State (2011–2014), under Mike Leach's spread offense in his years post-Texas Tech.
- David Klingler – Houston (1988–1991), under John Jenkins's run and shoot.
- Kevin Kolb – Houston (2003–2006), under Art Briles's spread offense.
- Marcus Mariota – Oregon (2012–2014), 2014 Heisman Trophy winner, under Chip Kelly and Mark Helfrich's spread offense
- Tim Tebow – Florida (2006–2009), 2007 Heisman Trophy winner, under Dan Mullen's spread option.
- Gino Torretta – Miami (FL) (1989–1992), 1992 Heisman Trophy winner, under Bob Bratkowski's pro-style offense.
- Andre Ware – Houston (1987–1989), 1989 Heisman Trophy winner, under John Jenkins's run and shoot offense.

The term has even been applied to highly successful players. One notable example is Tom Brady, an instance where critics credit his success to coaches Josh McDaniels or Bill Belichick. Even after winning multiple Super Bowls and MVPs, some pundits continued to use the label, illustrating how, even when applied to players with proven individual excellence, the term "system quarterback" can carry a dismissive tone.
