= Craig Stutzmann =

American football player and coach (born 1980)

Current position
- Title: Offensive coordinator
- Team: San Jose State
- Conference: MW

Biographical details
- Born: July 14, 1980 (age 46); Hilo, Hawaii
- Education: University of Hawaiʻi at Mānoa (BA, MEd)

Playing career
- 1998–2001: Hawaii
- 2002: BC Lions
- Position: Wide receiver

Coaching career (HC unless noted)
- 2003: Kalaheo HS (OC)
- 2004: Saint Louis (HI) (AC)
- 2005–2007: Saint Louis (HI)
- 2008: Hawaii (GA)
- 2009: Portland State (WR)
- 2010: Memphis (GA)
- 2011: Rhodes (WR)
- 2012–2013: Weber State (WR)
- 2014–2015: Emory & Henry (OC/QB)
- 2016–2019: Hawaii (PGC/QB)
- 2020–2021: Washington State (co-OC/QB)
- 2022: Utah Tech (OC/QB)
- 2022: Green Bay Packers (AC)
- 2023: Texas State (PGC/WR)
- 2024–present: San Jose State (OC)

Craig Keola Stutzmann (born July 14, 1980) is an American football coach and former player who is the offensive coordinator for the San Jose State Spartans. He was previously the co-offensive coordinator and quarterbacks coach for the Washington State Cougars. He played college football for the Hawaii Warriors.

== Playing career ==
Stutzmann was a four-year letterman at the University of Hawaii, where he played wide receiver. He started in three seasons as a slotback in June Jones' run and shoot offense, garnering two honorable mentions in all-WAC selections on his way to 2,025 career receiving yards. He made headlines in the final game of his college career in 2001 when he was ejected in the game against BYU for punting a football into the stands and jumping into them after scoring a touchdown. Stutzmann has stated that he does not regret doing the punt and that he probably would've practiced to punt it higher. He spent one season with the BC Lions of the Canadian Football League after his college career before getting into coaching.

== Coaching career ==
=== Early career ===
Stutzmann began his coaching career as Kalaheo High School in 2003, serving as the offensive coordinator for the football team. He was hired by his alma mater Saint Louis School in 2004 as a varsity assistant before being named the head coach of the junior varsity team in 2005. He was named a graduate assistant on the coaching staff at Hawaii in 2008, before leaving to join Jerry Glanville's staff at Portland State in 2009 as a wide receivers coach. After Glanville resigned from Portland State in 2009, Stutzmann left and accepted a position at Memphis as a graduate assistant. He was named the wide receivers coach at Rhodes College in Memphis in 2011, only spending one season there before being named the wide receivers coach at Weber State in 2012. He was named the offensive coordinator and quarterbacks coach at Emory & Henry in 2014, spending two seasons there before accepting a position on the coaching staff at Hawaii in 2016.

=== Second stint at Hawaii ===
Stutzmann was hired at Hawaii as the team's passing game coordinator under former teammate Nick Rolovich. He was also named the quarterbacks coach after Zak Hill left to be the offensive coordinator at Boise State.

After Rolovich left to be the next head coach at Washington State, Stutzmann was rumored to be a top candidate to replace Rolovich as head coach at Hawaii, garnering support from the Hawaii fanbase and received an endorsement from Heisman Trophy winner Marcus Mariota, who played at Saint Louis while Stutzmann was coaching at the school.

=== Washington State ===
After Todd Graham was hired as Rolovich's successor at Hawaii, Stutzmann was officially added to Rolovich's staff at Washington State. He was named the co-offensive coordinator and quarterbacks coach, sharing coordinator duties with Brian Smith. Washington State fired Stutzmann, along with Rolovich and three other assistants, for failing to comply with Washington's COVID-19 vaccination mandate.

=== Utah Tech ===
In January 2022, Stutzmann was announced as the new offensive coordinator and quarterbacks coach at Utah Tech, formerly known as Dixie State.

=== Green Bay Packers ===
On May 11, 2022, Stutzmann was announced as a member of the Green Bay Packers Bill Walsh Diversity Coaching Fellowship program.

=== San Jose State ===
Stutzmann joined San Jose State in 2024 as their offensive coordinator.

== Football strategy ==
After playing under the run and shoot for Jones and working alongside Rolovich as a coach, Stutzmann designed a spread offense variant called the "Spread-N-Shred" that he first implemented at Emory & Henry; the name was coined by Bristol Herald Courier writer Allen Gregory. The system is described as a "wide-open offense" that places offensive players across the field to misalign defenses.

== Personal life and education ==
Born in Hilo, Hawaii and raised in Honolulu, Stutzmann attended Saint Louis School before attending the University of Hawaii. He earned his bachelor's degree in political science from Hawaii in 2002, and his master's in education from Hawaii in 2010.

Stutzmann and his wife, Briana, have one son. His younger brother Billy Ray, also a wide receiver at Hawaii under Rolovich, was an offensive assistant at the United States Naval Academy before being terminated in September 2021, also for refusing to take a COVID vaccine. Billy Ray later worked under Craig at Utah Tech and San Jose State as a wide receivers coach and senior offensive analyst, respectively.
