= Marcus Kemp =

American football player (born 1995)

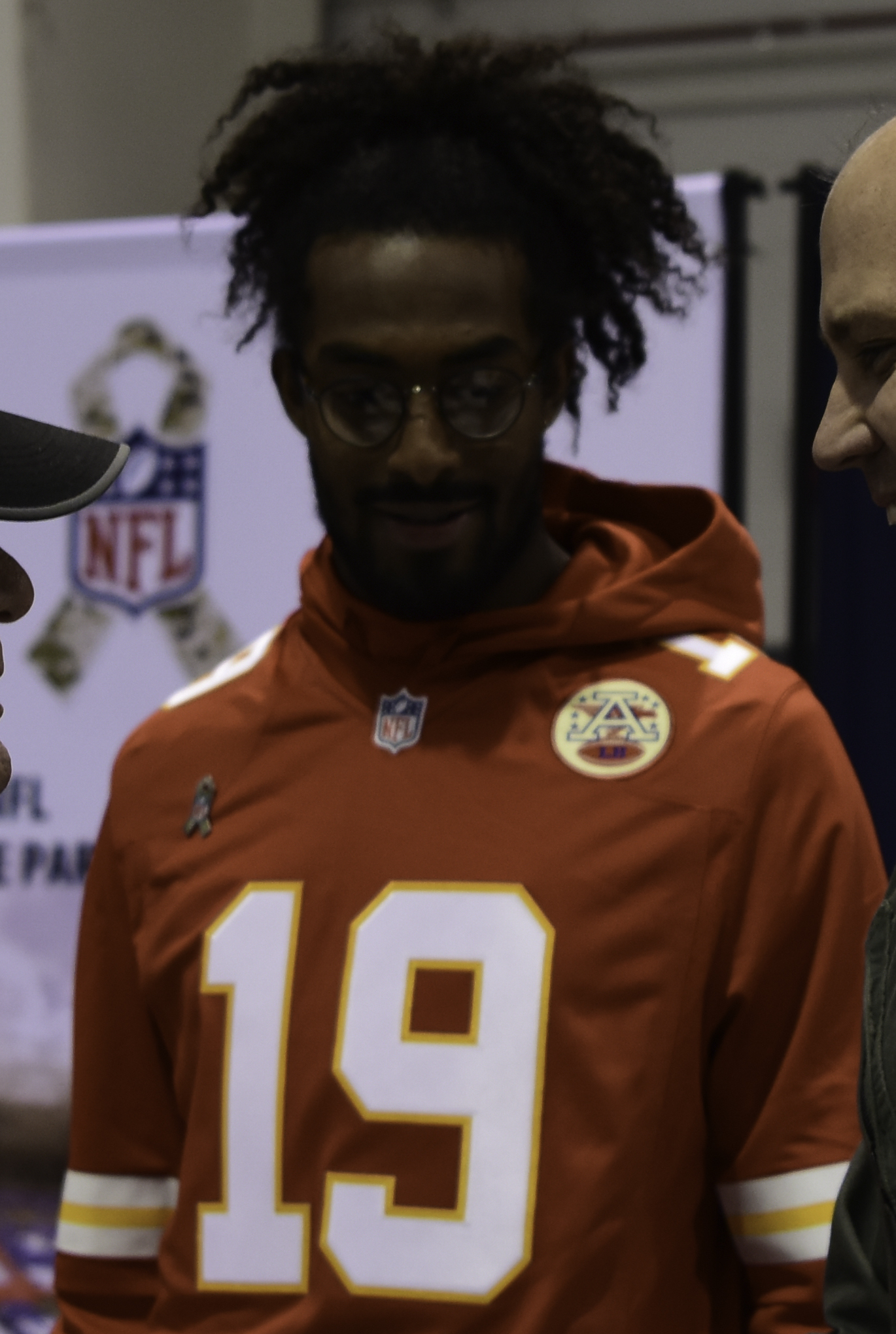
- Kemp with the Kansas City Chiefs in 2022

Profile
- Positions: Wide receiver, special teamer

Personal information
- Born: August 14, 1995 (age 31); Ogden, Utah, U.S.
- Listed height: 6 ft 4 in (1.93 m)
- Listed weight: 210 lb (95 kg)

Career information
- High school: Layton (Layton, Utah)
- College: Hawaii (2013–2016)
- NFL draft: 2017: undrafted

Career history
- Kansas City Chiefs (2017–2020); Miami Dolphins (2020); Kansas City Chiefs (2020–2021); New York Giants (2022)*; Kansas City Chiefs (2022); Washington Commanders (2023)*
- * Offseason or practice squad member only

Awards and highlights
- 2× Super Bowl champion (LIV, LVII)

Career NFL statistics
- Receptions: 4
- Receiving yards: 42
- Stats at Pro Football Reference

Marcus Kemp (born August 14, 1995) is an American professional football wide receiver and special teamer. He played college football at Hawaii before signing with the Kansas City Chiefs as an undrafted free agent in 2017. Kemp has also been a member of the Miami Dolphins, New York Giants, and Washington Commanders.

== College career ==
Kemp played college football for the Hawaii Rainbow Warriors. He was named the team's most valuable player during his senior year in 2016.

=== Statistics ===
College statistics
Season	GP	Rec	Yds	Avg	TD
2013	7	11	110	10.0	0
2014	12	56	797	14.2	3
2015	12	36	563	15.6	2
2016	14	73	1,100	15.1	8
Career	45	176	2,570	14.6	13

== Professional career ==
Pre-draft measurables
Height	Weight	Arm length	Hand span	40-yard dash	10-yard split	20-yard split	20-yard shuttle	Three-cone drill	Vertical jump	Broad jump	Bench press
6 ft 3 1/4 in (1.91 m)	200 lb (91 kg)	32 5/8 in (0.83 m)	9 5/8 in (0.24 m)	4.54 s	1.59 s	2.63 s	4.36 s	7.10 s	35.5 in (0.90 m)	10 ft 6 in (3.20 m)	10 reps
All values from Pro Day

=== Kansas City Chiefs (first stint) ===
Kemp was signed by the Kansas City Chiefs as an undrafted free agent on May 6, 2017. He was waived on September 2, 2017, and was signed to the Chiefs' practice squad the next day. He was signed to the active roster on October 14, 2017. He was waived on October 16, 2017, and was re-signed back to the practice squad. He was signed back to the active roster on January 2, 2018.

On August 20, 2019, he was placed on injured reserve with a torn ACL and MCL. Without Kemp, the Chiefs won Super Bowl LIV against the San Francisco 49ers. He was re-signed on August 19, 2020. He was waived on October 6, 2020, and signed to the practice squad two days later. He was elevated to the active roster on October 19, October 24, and October 31 for the team's weeks 6, 7, and 8 games against the Buffalo Bills, Denver Broncos, and New York Jets, and reverted to the practice squad following each game. He recorded his second career reception in week 6. He was promoted to the active roster on November 28, 2020. He was waived on December 15, 2020.

=== Miami Dolphins ===
On December 22, 2020, Kemp was signed to the Miami Dolphins' practice squad. He was elevated to the active roster on January 2, 2021, for the team's week 17 game against the Buffalo Bills, and reverted to the practice squad after the game. His practice squad contract with the team expired after the season on January 11, 2021.

=== Kansas City Chiefs (second stint) ===
On January 12, 2021, Kemp signed with the practice squad of the Chiefs. He was elevated to the active roster on January 23 and February 6 for the AFC Championship Game against the Buffalo Bills and Super Bowl LV against the Tampa Bay Buccaneers, and reverted to the practice squad after each game. His practice squad contract with the team expired after the season on February 16, 2021.

Kemp re-signed with the Chiefs on March 9, 2021. He was released on August 31, 2021. He was re-signed the following day. He was placed on the Reserve/COVID-19 list on November 18, 2021.

=== New York Giants ===
On July 26, 2022, the New York Giants signed Kemp. On August 24, 2022, Kemp was placed on injured reserve with a hamstring injury. He was released on August 30.

=== Kansas City Chiefs (third stint) ===
On October 3, 2022, Kemp was signed to the Chiefs practice squad.

In the 2022 AFC championship game, Kemp caught a crucial first-down pass from Patrick Mahomes. In his post-game press conference, Mahomes cited his work with Kemp on the 2017 Chiefs practice squad as a reason he felt comfortable with Kemp on the field. Kemp won his second Super Bowl ring when the Chiefs defeated the Philadelphia Eagles in Super Bowl LVII. He did not record a catch but had several key blocks on a record setting 66 yard punt return by Kadarius Toney.

=== Washington Commanders ===
On March 3, 2023, Kemp signed with the Washington Commanders. On August 28, 2023, he was released as part of final roster cuts before the start of 2023 season.
