= Leo Koloamatangi =

American football player (born 1994)

Profile
- Position: Center

Personal information
- Born: May 9, 1994 (age 32); Fort Worth, Texas, U.S.
- Listed height: 6 ft 5 in (1.96 m)
- Listed weight: 305 lb (138 kg)

Career information
- High school: Sacred Heart Prep (Atherton, California)
- College: Hawaii
- NFL draft: 2017: undrafted

Career history
- Detroit Lions (2017–2018); New York Jets (2019–2020)
- Stats at Pro Football Reference

Mafileo "Leo" Koloamatangi (born May 9, 1994) is an American former football center. He played college football at Hawaii, and was signed by the Detroit Lions as an undrafted free agent in 2017. He was also a member of the New York Jets.

== Professional career ==
=== Detroit Lions ===
Koloamatangi was signed by the Detroit Lions as an undrafted free agent on May 12, 2017. He was waived on September 2, 2017 and was signed to the practice squad the next day. He signed a reserve/future contract on January 1, 2018.

On September 2, 2018, Koloamatangi was waived by the Lions and re-signed to the practice squad. He was promoted to the active roster on December 11, 2018.

On August 31, 2019, Koloamatangi was waived by the Lions.

=== New York Jets ===
On October 30, 2019, was signed to the New York Jets practice squad. He was promoted to the active roster on November 16, 2019.

Koloamatangi re-signed with the Jets on April 23, 2020. On July 28, 2020, he opted out of the 2020 season due to the COVID-19 pandemic. He was waived after the season on May 7, 2021.
