= June Jones =

American football player and coach (1953–2026)

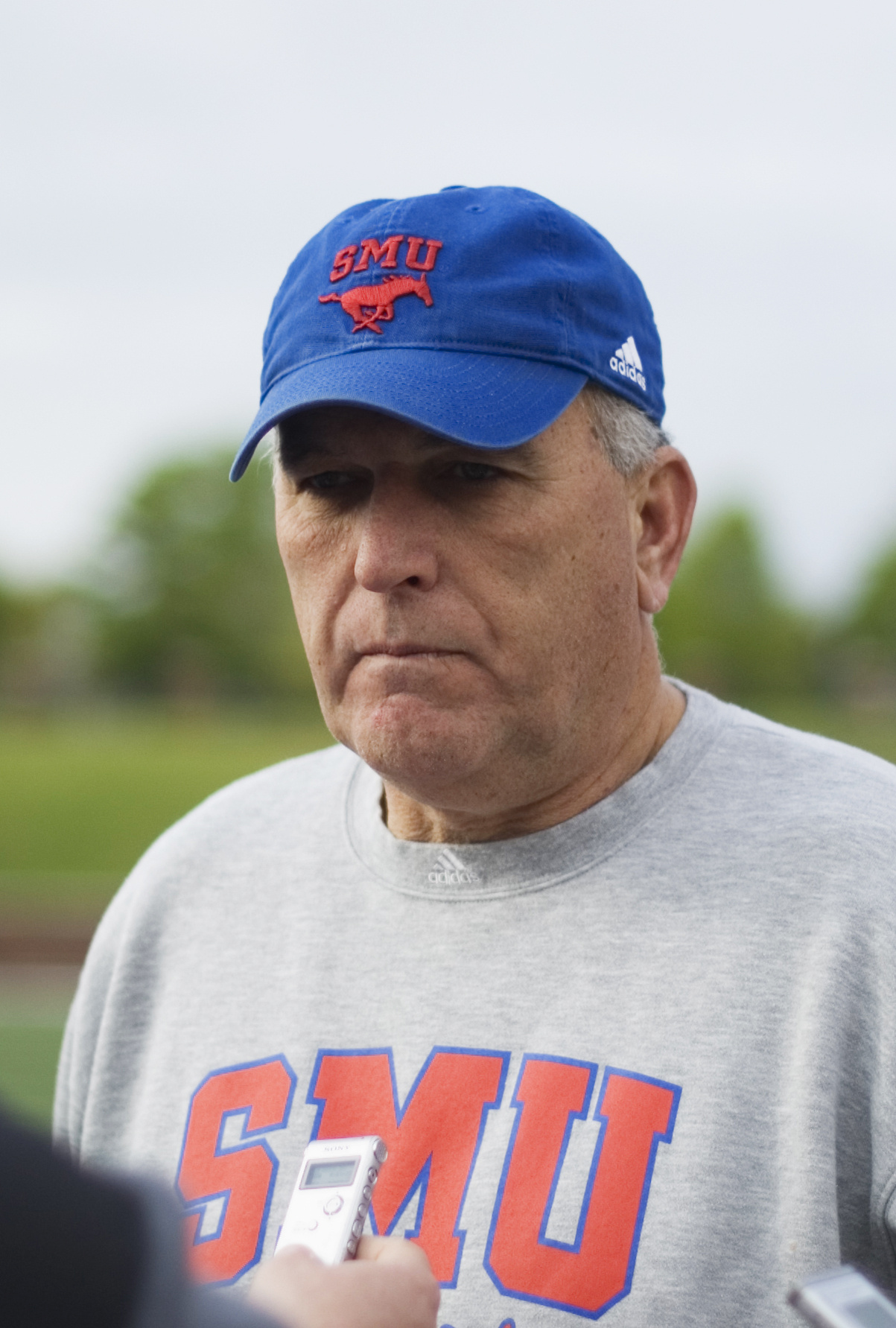
- Jones in 2009

No. 14
- Position: Quarterback

Personal information
- Born: February 19, 1953; Portland, Oregon, U.S.
- Died: October 29, 2026 (aged 73); Oregon, U.S.
- Listed height: 6 ft 4 in (1.93 m)
- Listed weight: 200 lb (91 kg)

Career information
- High school: Grant (Portland)
- College: Oregon (1971–1972); Hawaii (1973–1974); Portland State (1975–1976)
- NFL draft: 1977: undrafted

Career history

Playing
- Atlanta Falcons (1977–1981); Toronto Argonauts (1982)

Coaching
- Hawaii (1983) Quarterbacks coach; Houston Gamblers (1984) Wide receivers coach; Denver Gold (1985) Offensive coordinator; Ottawa Rough Riders (1986) Offensive coordinator; Houston Oilers (1987–1988) Quarterbacks coach; Detroit Lions (1989–1990) Quarterbacks coach & wide receivers coach; Atlanta Falcons (1991–1996); Offensive coordinator (1991–1993); Head coach (1994–1996); San Diego Chargers (1998) Quarterbacks coach & interim head coach; Hawaii (1999–2007) Head coach; SMU (2008–2014) Head coach; Kapolei HS (HI) (2016) Offensive coordinator; Hamilton Tiger-Cats (2017–2018) Head coach; Houston Roughnecks (2020) Head coach; TSL Conquerors (2020) Offensive coordinator; Seattle Sea Dragons (2023) Offensive coordinator

Operations
- Saint Louis School (HI) (2016–2017) Athletic director; Houston Roughnecks (2020) General manager

Awards and highlights
- As head coach: 2 WAC (1999, 2007); 2 C-USA West Division (2009, 2010); Sporting News College Football Coach of the Year (1999); American Football Coach/Schutt Sports National COY (1999); CNN/SI National Coach of the Year (1999); 3× WAC Coach of the Year (1999, 2006, 2007); XFL Head Coach of the Year (2020)

Career NFL statistics
- Passing attempts: 166
- Passing completions: 75
- Completion percentage: 45.2%
- TD–INT: 3–7
- Passing yards: 923
- Passer rating: 51.4
- Stats at Pro Football Reference

Head coaching record
- Regular season: College: 105–81 (.565); NFL: 22–36 (.379); CFL: 14–14 (.500); XFL: 5–0 (1.000)
- Postseason: College: 7–3 (.700); NFL: 0–1 (.000); CFL: 1–1 (.500)
- Career: College: 112–84 (.571); NFL: 22–37 (.373); CFL: 15–15 (.500); XFL: 5–0 (1.000)
- Coaching profile at Pro Football Reference

June Sheldon Jones III (February 19, 1953 – October 29, 2026) was an American football player and coach. Jones was the head football coach at the University of Hawaii at Manoa from 1999 to 2007 and Southern Methodist University (SMU) from 2008 until his resignation in 2014. He coached in the National Football League (NFL) for three years as head coach of the Atlanta Falcons from 1994 to 1996, plus a ten-game stint as interim head coach of the San Diego Chargers in 1998; he also spent 1 1/2 seasons as head coach of the Hamilton Tiger-Cats in the Canadian Football League (CFL). Jones was the general manager and head coach of the Houston Roughnecks.

Jones played professionally as a quarterback in the NFL and CFL. He played college football with the Oregon Ducks, Hawaii Rainbow Warriors and Portland State Vikings.

== Early life ==
Jones grew up in Portland, Oregon, the second of four children born to Marilyn and June Jones Jr. Jones was an All-City football, basketball, and baseball player at Portland's Grant High School. He was second team all-state in basketball, as well. In 1991, Jones was inducted into the Portland Interscholastic League Hall of Fame.

== College playing career ==
Jones played the quarterback in college for three teams: the Oregon Ducks (1971–1972), the Hawaii Rainbow Warriors (1973–1974), and the Portland State Vikings (1975–1976). During his time at Portland State he was introduced to the run and shoot offense by head coach Mouse Davis. Jones would later champion the run and shoot throughout his coaching career.

In two seasons at Portland State, Jones threw for 5,798 yards passing with 41 touchdowns against 20 interceptions, while leading the Vikings to the program's first eight-win seasons. In 1976, Jones set program records for total offense (3,463 yards) and passing yards (3,513). Both marks were broken by Jones successor, Neil Lomax. Jones was the team's offensive MVP in both seasons and named a first-team American Football Coaches Association All-American in 1976. He was inducted into the Portland State Hall of Fame in 1998 and is credited with being the first quarterback to give the run and shoot legitimacy as a quarterback-friendly offense.

== Professional playing career ==
After college, Jones signed as an undrafted free agent with the Atlanta Falcons in 1977. He spent four seasons backing up quarterback Steve Bartkowski, the No. 1 overall pick of the 1975 NFL Draft from 1977 to 1981 (with the exception of the 1980 season due to a leg injury he suffered from a motorcycle crash). He started five games during his NFL career, with his only win as a starter coming in the opening game of the 1978 season against the Houston Oilers. Overall, Jones completed 75 of 166 passes for 923 yards with three touchdowns and seven interceptions. Jones spent the 1982 season playing for the Toronto Argonauts of the Canadian Football League and subsequently retired to move into coaching.

== Coaching career ==
=== Early career ===
In 1983, Jones started his coaching career as a graduate assistant under Dick Tomey at the University of Hawaii. He then spent two years in the USFL, first as the wide receivers coach for the Houston Gamblers (1984), then as the offensive coordinator for the Denver Gold (1985). Following the demise of the USFL, Jones spent the 1986 season working as an offensive assistant for the Ottawa Rough Riders of the CFL. In 1987, he got his first NFL coaching position serving as the quarterbacks coach on Jerry Glanville's staff with the Houston Oilers. After Glanville was released by the Oilers, he would join the Detroit Lions coaching staff upon the recommendation of Mouse Davis, his college head coach at Portland State who was serving as the team's offensive coordinator.

=== Atlanta Falcons ===
Jones reunited with Glanville upon joining the Atlanta Falcons organization in 1991 as its assistant head coach. In 1994, Jones replaced Glanville as the team's head coach, a move that caused a rift between the two. Reportedly, they did not speak to each other for several years thereafter. (Later, in the 2000s, Jones would hire Glanville as defensive coordinator at Hawaii.) As head coach, Jones installed the run and shoot offense he learned under Mouse Davis. Initially, quarterback Jeff George flourished under the system, passing for 3,734 yards and 23 touchdowns in Jones's first year and 4,143 yards and 24 touchdowns his second year. In 1995, Jones's second season as head coach, the Falcons went to the playoffs, losing in the first round to the Green Bay Packers. The following year, the Falcons posted a 3–13 record, leading to Jones's dismissal. Jones's coaching record over three seasons in Atlanta was nineteen wins and twenty-nine losses. He also clashed with quarterback Jeff George during his final season, including a well-publicized and widely broadcast profanity-laced shouting match during a September 22 game against the Philadelphia Eagles. The feud contributed to both men's release by the organization.

=== San Diego Chargers ===
Jones returned to coaching when the San Diego Chargers hired him as quarterbacks coach on January 20, 1998. On October 13, 1998, head coach Kevin Gilbride was fired after the sixth game of the season and Jones became the interim head coach. The Chargers won three of ten games coached by Jones, giving him a career NFL coaching record of 22 wins and 36 losses.

=== Hawaii ===
Jones joined the University of Hawaii-Manoa football team as head coach, replacing Fred von Appen, who was fired when the team lost 18 games in a row, including all 12 games in the 1998 season. Jones led the Warriors to a 9–4 record and a share of the Western Athletic Conference football championship in the 1999 season, making it the most dramatic turnaround in NCAA football history until that record was surpassed by Tulane in the 2022–23 season. With Jones's success on the field, and media-friendly persona off the field, he instantly became one of the most famous people in Hawaii, with some people making "June Jones for Governor" T-shirts. Reflecting his offensive philosophy, bumper stickers sporting the slogan "June would throw" appeared. These referenced legendary Hawaiian lifeguard Eddie Aikau, of whom it is said, "Eddie would go" (into big surf).

Joe Moore of KHON-TV in Honolulu faulted Jones for discarding long-standing traditions, such as changing music played during home games, and the change in the uniforms and team nickname during his tenure.

During his tenure at Hawaii, he coached five All-Americans, 52 all-conference performers, and 16 NFL Draft picks. In particular, Jones claims to have made a special effort to recruit local talent in his players and coaching staff. One of the most notable of his recruits was quarterback Timmy Chang, who became the all-time NCAA leader in passing yardage.

Jones was injured in a car accident on February 22, 2001, missing the spring season because of his injuries.

Jones negotiated a contract worth $800,016 during the 2004 season, which made him the highest-paid public employee in the state, even though the football team was struggling. The team finished with a 7–5 regular season record and an invitation to the Hawaii Bowl. Half of Jones's $800,000 salary was paid by private donors.

On December 24, 2006, Jones passed Dick Tomey to become the winningest head coach in Hawaii football history (against an all-college schedule) with a 41–24 victory over Arizona State in the 2006 Hawaii Bowl.

Frustrated with what he viewed as a lack of support from the university, Jones opted to leave Hawaii at the end of the 2007 season. After initial reports had him interviewing at SMU, Hawaii officials had offers to raise his salary from $800,000 a year to $1.7 million a year and offered a commitment to improve its facilities; in addition there was an outpouring of support from Hawaii fans, including Gov. Linda Lingle. However, Jones contacted Hawaii on January 7, 2008, and let them know he had decided to accept an offer from SMU. Jones said the work that needed to be done to improve the football facilities and the campus in general would never get done with him still there. He said after all of the broken promises, leaving was the only way to send a message. Jones went 76–41 at Hawaii, including 4–2 in bowls. His teams finished first in the WAC twice and second two other times.

=== SMU ===
In a press conference at the Hall of Champions adjacent to Gerald J. Ford Stadium on January 7, 2008, Jones was introduced as the new head football coach at Southern Methodist University. He was the school's fifth coach since the NCAA-imposed "death penalty" in 1987. Jones signed a five-year contract with SMU, paying him two million dollars annually, and making him the highest-paid coach in Conference USA. He guided the SMU Mustangs to a 1–11 record in 2008.

On November 28, 2009, Jones coached SMU to a win over Tulane, ending the regular season with a 7–5 record, the most SMU victories in a season since before the death penalty in the 1980s. The 2009 season included a win over the defending and eventual repeat C-USA champion, East Carolina. The 2009 season also saw Jones utilize the ground game more than in recent seasons. Jones led SMU to its third bowl-eligible season, and to its first bowl game (Hawai'i Bowl) since the 1984 Aloha Bowl and the NCAA-imposed death penalty. SMU defeated Nevada, 45–10, to finish the season 8–5. As in 1999, Jones coached his team to the most improved record in Division I football.

In 2010, Jones coached the Mustangs to a .500 season. The Mustangs went 7–7 overall with a conference record of 6–2, helping them clinch the C-USA Western title. The team beat the previous year's C-USA champion, East Carolina, in overtime in the final regular-season game but lost the Conference USA Championship Game in Orlando to UCF the next week. Jones and the Mustangs went to their second consecutive bowl game, the Armed Forces Bowl, losing to the Army Black Knights, 16–14. The game was played at SMU's Gerald J. Ford Stadium because the game's normal venue, Texas Christian University's Amon G. Carter Stadium, was undergoing renovation.

On September 8, 2014, Jones stepped down as coach of the Mustangs, citing "personal issues". Jones led the Mustangs to four straight bowl appearances before finishing 5–7 in the school's first season as a member of the AAC and starting the 2014 season 0–2, losing by a combined total of 88–6.

While at SMU, he was publicly questioned about the number of players on the team from outside of Texas, and for a lack of recruiting. SMU won 1 game in 2014 and 2 games in 2015 with the players Jones had recruited.

=== High school football ===
After interviewing for the vacant coaching job at Hawaii, Jones was hired as the offensive coordinator at Kapolei High School in January 2016. In December 2016, Jones was named director of athletics at Saint Louis School and the door was left open for him to step into the football coach's job, if it opened.

=== CFL ===
On August 2, 2017, the Hamilton Tiger-Cats hired Jones as an assistant coach. He was hired after the team had lost their first five regular-season games, the last of which was a 60–1 blowout. On August 24, 2017, he was named interim head coach, after Kent Austin stepped down to focus on his duties as vice-president of football operations. The team was 0–8 at the time Jones was appointed head coach.

He quickly became embroiled in controversy when he attempted to get his longtime friend and former Baylor University coach Art Briles hired as an assistant. Briles had been fired from Baylor for his actions in connection with a major sexual assault scandal at the school. Following a media firestorm, the team reversed the decision to hire Briles.

As head coach, Jones led the Tiger-Cats to a respectable 6–4 record over the ten games that remained in the 2017 season. Because of this, the Tiger-Cats removed the "interim" tag and retained Jones as head coach for the next three seasons.

After an 8–10 season in 2018 (which included a playoff berth), Jones agreed to step aside for the highly sought-after Orlondo Steinauer to take over as head coach. Jones initially intended to stay on in 2019 as associate head coach and offensive coordinator but departed May 13, 2019. His record as a CFL head coach is 14–14.

=== XFL ===
On May 20, 2019, the XFL confirmed it had hired Jones to serve as its Houston franchise's head coach.

For the 2023 XFL season, Jones signed on as the offensive coordinator for Jim Haslett's coaching staff, with Jones stating that he and Haslett would be coaching the Seattle Sea Dragons. He resigned on July 1, 2023.

== Coaching style ==
As an American collegiate coach, Jones's offenses rarely ran the ball, favoring a wide-open, pass-heavy offense, the run and shoot approach; however, in 2010 sophomore tailback Zach Line rushed for over 1,450 yards in 14 games, making him the 11th best rusher in the FBS. Jones was also notable for never holding full-contact practices.

== Personal life and death ==
On June 30, 2023, at age 70, Jones was arrested in Honolulu under suspicion of driving while under the influence of alcohol.

Jones died in Oregon on October 29, 2026, at the age of 73.

== Head coaching record ==
=== College ===
Year	Team	Overall	Conference	Standing	Bowl/playoffs	Coaches^{#}	AP^{°}
Hawaii Warriors (Western Athletic Conference) (1999–2007)
1999	Hawaii	9–4	5–2	T–1st	W Oahu		
2000	Hawaii	3–9	2–6	T–6th			
2001	Hawaii	9–3	5–3	T–4th			
2002	Hawaii	10–4	7–1	2nd	L Hawaii	24	
2003	Hawaii	9–5	5–3	T–4th	W Hawaii		
2004	Hawaii	8–5	4–4	5th	W Hawaii		
2005	Hawaii	5–7	4–4	5th			
2006	Hawaii	11–3	7–1	2nd	W Hawaii	24	
2007	Hawaii	12–1	8–0	1st	L Sugar^{†}	17	19
Hawaii:		76–41	47–24				
SMU Mustangs (Conference USA) (2008–2012)
2008	SMU	1–11	0–8	6th (West)			
2009	SMU	8–5	6–2	T–1st (West)	W Hawaii		
2010	SMU	7–7	6–2	T–1st (West)	L Armed Forces		
2011	SMU	8–5	5–3	3rd (West)	W BBVA Compass		
2012	SMU	7–6	5–3	2nd (West)	W Hawaii		
SMU Mustangs (American Athletic Conference) (2013–2014)
2013	SMU	5–7	4–4	5th			
2014	SMU	0–2 (Note: Resigned on September 8, 2014. Defensive coordinator Tom Mason served as interim head coach for the final 10 games of the season.)	0–0	10th			
SMU:		36–43	26–22				
Total:		112–84					
National championship Conference title Conference division title or championship game berth
^{†}Indicates BCS bowl.; ^{#}Rankings from final Coaches Poll.; ^{°}Rankings from final AP Poll.

=== NFL ===
Team	Year	Regular season					Postseason			
Team	Year	Won	Lost	Ties	Win %	Finish	Won	Lost	Win %	Result
ATL	1994	7	9	0	.438	3rd in NFC West	–	–	–	–
ATL	1995	9	7	0	.563	2nd in NFC West	0	1	.000	Lost to Green Bay Packers in NFC Wild Card Game
ATL	1996	3	13	0	.188	4th in NFC West	–	–	–	–
ATL total		19	29	0	.396		0	1	.000	
SD (Note: Became interim head coach when Kevin Gilbride was fired after the sixth game of the season.)	1998	3	7	0	.300	5th in AFC West	–	–	–	–
SD total		3	7	0	.300		0	0	–	
Total		22	36	0	.379		0	1	.000	

=== CFL ===
Team	Year	Regular season					Postseason		
Team	Year	Won	Lost	Ties	Win %	Finish	Won	Lost	Result
HAM	2017	6	4	0	.600	3rd in East Division	–	–	Missed playoffs
HAM	2018	8	10	0	.444	2nd in East Division	1	1	Lost in Eastern Final
Total		14	14	0	.500		1	1	

=== XFL ===
Team	Year	Regular season					Postseason			
Team	Year	Won	Lost	Ties	Win %	Finish	Won	Lost	Win %	Result
HOU	2020	5	0	0	1.000	TBD	0	0	.000	TBD
Total		5	0	0	1.000		0	0	.000	
