= Quarterback =

Position in gridiron football

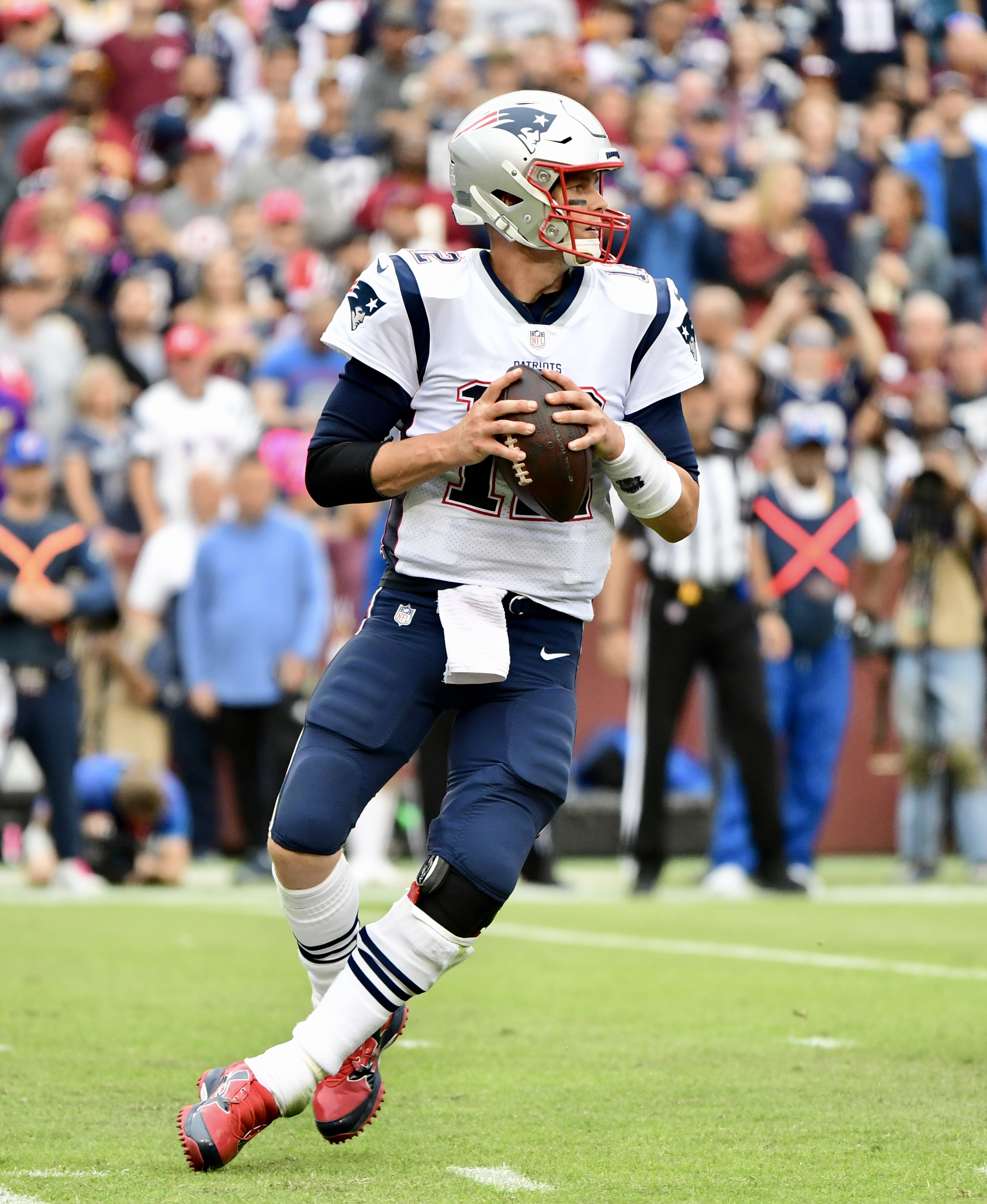
Seven-time Super Bowl champion quarterback Tom Brady in a 2019 game at the Washington Redskins

The quarterback (QB) is a position in gridiron football who is a member of the offensive side of the ball and usually lines up directly behind the offensive line. In modern American football, the quarterback is usually considered the leader of the offense, and is often responsible for calling the play in the huddle. The quarterback also touches the ball on almost every offensive play, and is almost always the offensive player that throws forward passes. When the QB is tackled behind the line of scrimmage, it is called a sack. The position is also colloquially known as the "signal caller" and "field general". The quarterback is widely considered the most important position in American football, and one of the most important positions in Northern American team sports.

== Overview ==
An example of quarterback positioning in an I-formation

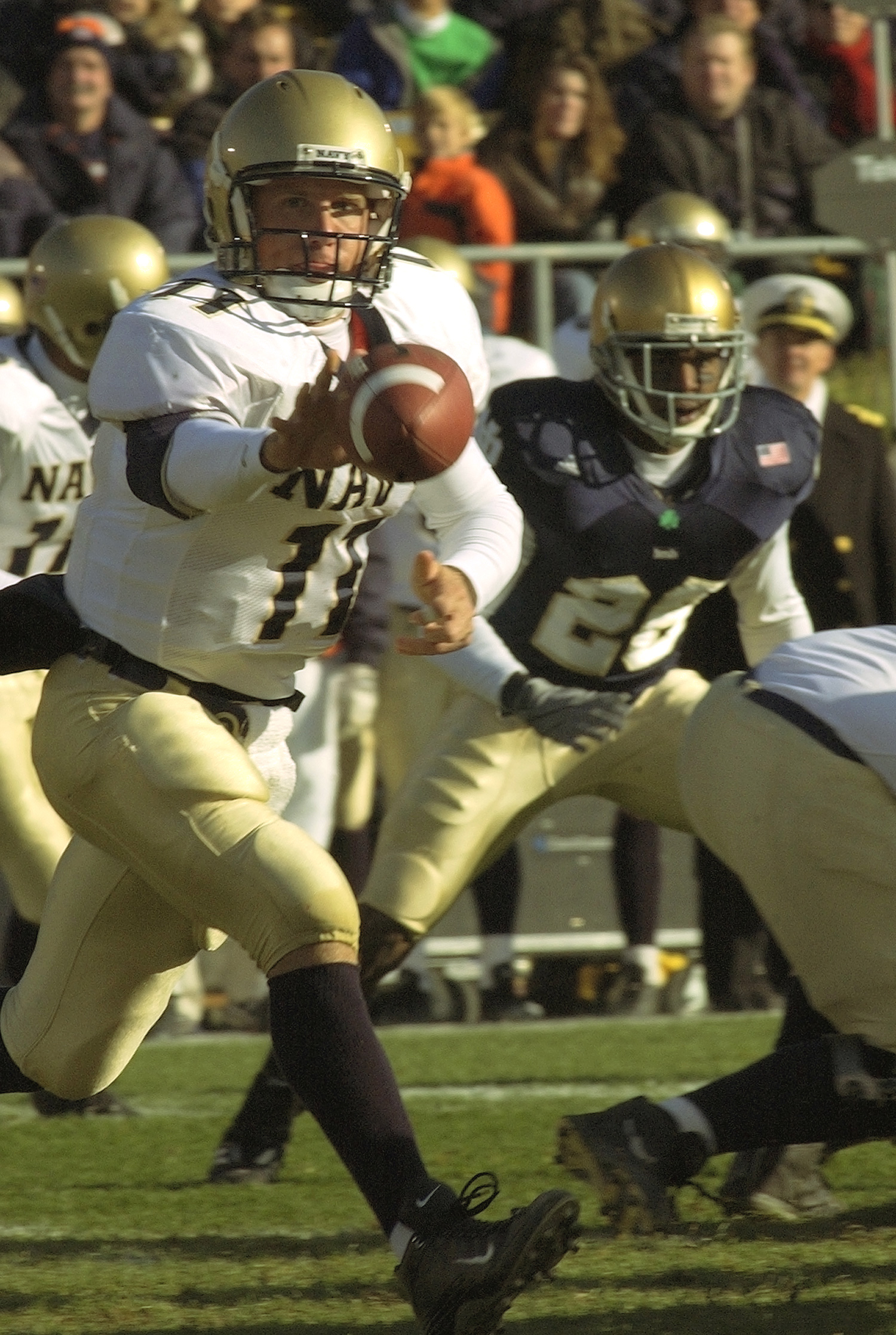
Navy Midshipmen quarterback Craig Candeto pitches the ball while running an option-based offense

In modern American football, the starting quarterback is usually the leader of the offense, and their successes and failures can have a significant impact on the fortunes of their team. Accordingly, the quarterback is among the most glorified, scrutinized, and highest-paid positions in team sports; the majority of the highest-paid players in the NFL are quarterbacks, and teams often use their top draft picks to select a quarterback. Bleacher Report describes the signing of a starting quarterback as a catch-22, where "NFL teams cannot maintain success without excellent quarterback play. But excellent quarterback play is usually so expensive that it prevents NFL teams from maintaining success"; a star quarterback's high salary may prevent the signing of other expensive star players as the team has to stay under the hard salary cap. One of the major contributing factors behind the success and longevity of the New England Patriots' Brady–Belichick era was the willingness of starting quarterback Tom Brady to consistently take pay cuts despite his elite performance, which allowed the Patriots to spend that money elsewhere on additional skill players, with a famous example of this being the signing of Hall of Fame wide receiver Randy Moss in 2007.

The quarterback touches the ball on almost every offensive play. Depending on the play calling system, prior to each play the quarterback will usually gather the rest of their team together in a huddle to tell them which play the team will run. However, when there is not much time left, or when an offense simply wants to increase the tempo of their plays, teams will forgo the huddle and the quarterback may call plays while the other offensive players get into position or at the line of scrimmage. After the team is lined up, the center will pass the ball back to the quarterback (a process called the snap). Usually on a running play, the quarterback will then hand or pitch the ball backwards to a halfback or fullback. On a passing play, the quarterback is almost always the player responsible for trying to throw the ball downfield to an eligible receiver. Additionally, the quarterback may run with the football himself, as part of a designed play like the option run or quarterback sneak, or the quarterback could make an impromptu run on their own (called a "scramble") to avoid being sacked by the defense. Nowadays, many quarterbacks choose to scramble or run option plays like Lamar Jackson, who is known for his rushing ability.

Depending on the offensive scheme used by their team, the quarterback's role can vary. In systems like the triple option, the quarterback will only pass the ball a few times per game, if at all, while the pass-heavy spread offense, as run by schools like Texas Tech, requires quarterbacks to throw the ball on most plays. The passing game is emphasized heavily in the Canadian Football League (CFL), where there are only three downs (as opposed to the four downs used in American football), a larger field of play and an extra eligible receiver. Different skillsets are required of the quarterback depending upon the offensive system. Quarterbacks that perform well in a pass-heavy spread offense system, a popular offensive scheme in the NCAA and NFHS, rarely perform well in the National Football League (NFL), as the fundamentals of the pro-style offense used in the NFL are very different from those in the spread system, while quarterbacks in Canadian football need to be able to throw the ball often and accurately. In general, quarterbacks need to have physical skills such as arm strength, mobility and a quick throwing motion, in addition to intangibles such as competitiveness, leadership, intelligence and downfield vision.

In the NFL, quarterbacks are required to wear a uniform number between 1 and 19. In the National Collegiate Athletic Association (NCAA) and National Federation of State High School Associations (NFHS), quarterbacks are required to wear a uniform number between 1 and 49; in the NFHS, the quarterback can also wear a number between 80 and 89. In the CFL, the quarterback can wear any number from 0 to 49 and 70 to 99. Because of their numbering, quarterbacks are eligible receivers in the NCAA, NFHS and CFL; in the NFL, quarterbacks are eligible receivers if they are not lined up directly under center.

== Leadership ==
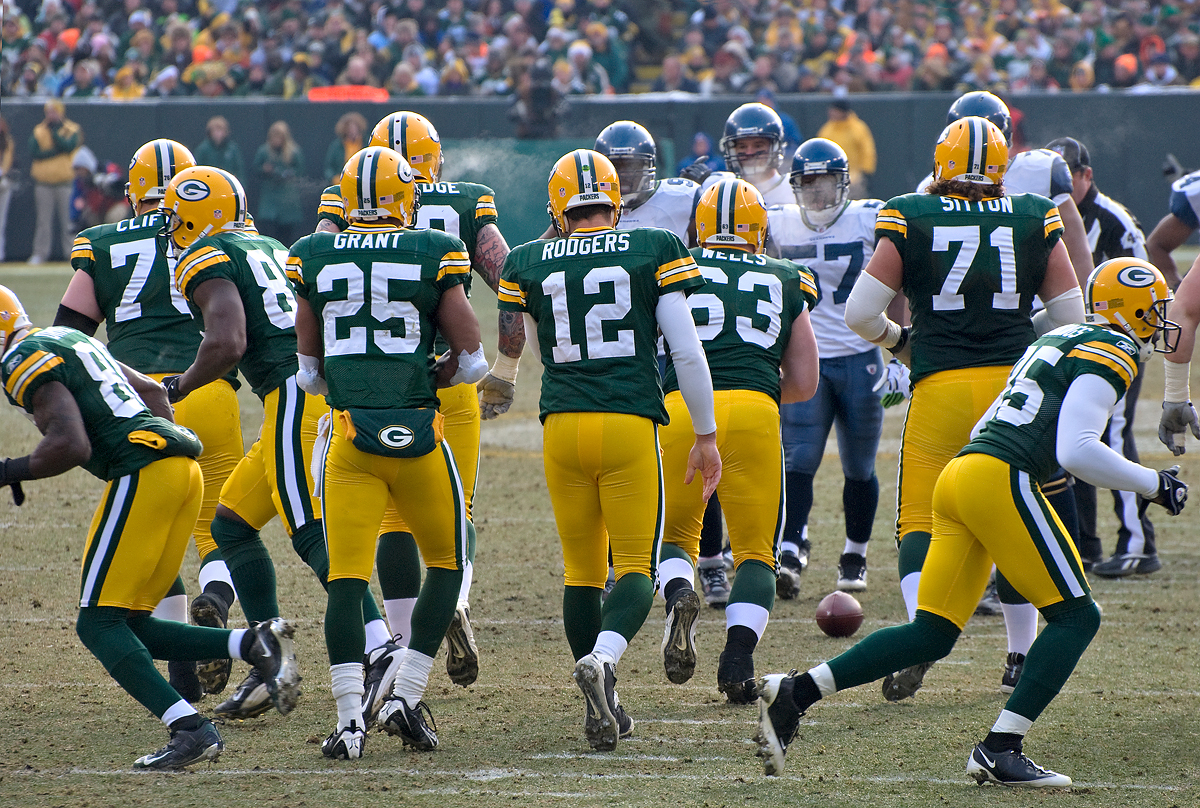
Green Bay Packers quarterback Aaron Rodgers (No. 12) breaks the Packers' offensive huddle

Often compared to captains of other team sports, before the implementation of NFL team captains in 2007, the starting quarterback was usually the de facto team leader and a well-respected player on and off the field. Since 2007, when the NFL allowed teams to designate several captains to serve as on-field leaders, the starting quarterback has usually been one of the team captains as the leader of the team's offense.

In the NFL, while the starting quarterback has no other responsibility or authority, they may, depending on the league or individual team, have various informal duties, such as participation in pre-game ceremonies, the coin toss or other events outside the game. For instance, the starting quarterback is the first player (and third person after the team owner and head coach) to be presented with the Lamar Hunt Trophy/George Halas Trophy (after winning the AFC/NFC Conference title) and the Vince Lombardi Trophy (after a Super Bowl victory). The starting quarterback of the victorious Super Bowl team is often chosen for the "I'm going to Disney World!" campaign (which includes a trip to Walt Disney World for them and their families), whether they are the Super Bowl MVP or not; examples include Joe Montana (XXIII), Trent Dilfer (XXXV), Peyton Manning (50) and Tom Brady (LIII). Dilfer was chosen even though teammate Ray Lewis was the MVP of Super Bowl XXXV, due to the bad publicity from Lewis' murder trial the previous year.

Being able to rely on a quarterback is vital to team morale. San Diego Chargers safety Rodney Harrison called the 1998 season a "nightmare" because of poor play by Ryan Leaf and Craig Whelihan and, from the rookie Leaf, obnoxious behavior toward teammates. Although their 1999 season replacements Jim Harbaugh and Erik Kramer were not stars, linebacker Junior Seau said, "You can't imagine the security we feel as teammates knowing we have two quarterbacks who have performed in this league and know how to handle themselves as players and as leaders".

Commentators have noted the "disproportionate importance" of the quarterback, describing it as the "most glorified—and scrutinized—position" in team sports. It is believed that "there is no other position in sports that 'dictates the terms' of a game the way quarterback does", whether that impact is positive or negative, as "Everybody feeds off of what the quarterback can and cannot do...Defensively, offensively, everybody reacts to what threats or non-threats the quarterback has. Everything else is secondary". "An argument can be made that quarterback is the most influential position in team sports, considering he touches the ball on virtually every offensive play of a far shorter season than baseball, basketball or hockey—a season in which every game is vitally important". Most consistently successful NFL teams (for instance, multiple Super Bowl appearances within a short period of time) have been centered around a single starting quarterback; the one exception was the Washington Redskins under head coach Joe Gibbs who won three Super Bowls with three different starting quarterbacks from 1982 to 1991. Many of these NFL dynasties ended with the departure of their starting quarterback.

On a team's defense, the middle linebacker is regarded as "quarterback of the defense" and is often the defensive leader, since they must be as smart as they are athletic. The middle linebacker (MLB), sometimes known as the "Mike", is the only inside linebacker in the 4–3 scheme.

== Backup ==
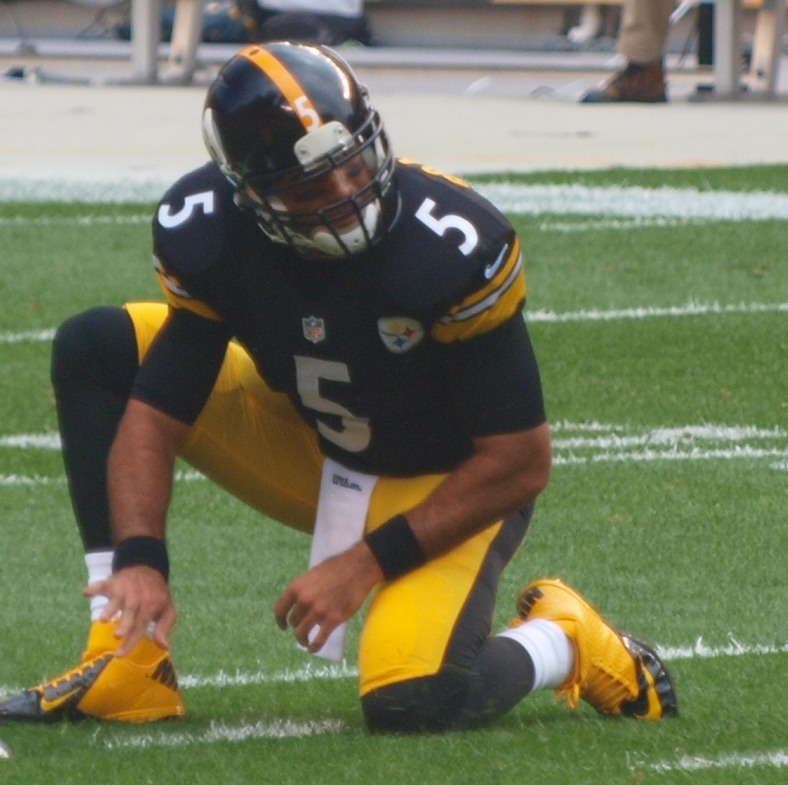
Pittsburgh Steelers backup quarterback Bruce Gradkowski acting as the ball holder for a kick

Compared to other positions in gridiron football, the backup quarterback gets considerably less playing time than the starting quarterback. While players at many other positions may rotate in and out during a game, and even a starter at most other positions rarely plays every snap, a team's starting quarterback often remains in the game for every play, which means that a team's primary backup may go an entire season without taking a meaningful offensive snap. While their primary role may be to be available in case of injury to the starter, the backup quarterback may also have additional roles such as a holder on placekicks or as a punter, and will often play a key role in practice, serving as the upcoming opponent's quarterback during the preceding week's practices. A backup quarterback may also be put in during "garbage time" (when the score is so lopsided and the time left in the game is so short that the outcome cannot realistically be changed), or start a meaningless late-season game (either the team has been eliminated from the postseason, or the playoff seeding cannot be affected), in order to ensure the starting quarterback does not needlessly risk an injury. Backup quarterbacks typically have the career of a journeyman quarterback and have short stints with multiple teams, with notable exceptions being Frank Reich and Gary Kubiak, who backed up Jim Kelly and John Elway for nine years each with the Buffalo Bills and Denver Broncos respectively.

A quarterback controversy results when a team has two capable quarterbacks competing for the starting position. Dallas Cowboys head coach Tom Landry alternated Roger Staubach and Craig Morton on each play, sending in the quarterbacks with the play call from the sideline; Morton started in Super Bowl V, which his team lost, while Staubach started in Super Bowl VI the following year and won. Although Morton played most of the 1972 season due to an injury to Staubach, Staubach took back the starting job when he rallied the Cowboys in a come-from-behind win in the playoffs and Morton was subsequently traded; Staubach and Morton faced each other in Super Bowl XII. Another notable quarterback controversy involved the San Francisco 49ers, who had three capable starters: Joe Montana, Steve Young and Steve Bono. Montana suffered a season-ending injury that cost him the 1991 NFL season and was supplanted by Young. Young was injured midway through the season, but Bono held the starting job (despite Young's recovery) until Bono's own injury let Young reclaim it. Montana also missed most of the 1992 NFL season, making only one appearance, then was traded away at his request to take over as the starter for the Kansas City Chiefs; upon retirement, he was succeeded by Bono as the Chiefs' starting quarterback.

Teams will often bring in a capable backup quarterback via the draft or a trade, as competition or potential replacement which would certainly threaten the starting quarterback's place in the team (see Two-quarterback system below). For instance, Drew Brees began his career with the San Diego Chargers but the team also drafted Philip Rivers; despite Brees initially retaining his starting job and being the Comeback Player of the Year he was not re-signed due to an injury and joined the New Orleans Saints as a free agent. Brees and Rivers both retired in 2021, each having been a starter for the Saints and Chargers, respectively, for over a decade. Aaron Rodgers was drafted by the Green Bay Packers as the eventual successor to Brett Favre, though Rodgers served in a backup role for a few years to develop sufficiently for the team to give him the starting job; Rodgers would himself encounter a similar situation in 2020 when the Packers drafted quarterback Jordan Love. Similarly, Patrick Mahomes was selected by the Kansas City Chiefs to eventually supplant Alex Smith, with the latter willingly serving as a mentor.

== Trends and other roles ==
In addition to their main role, quarterbacks are occasionally used in other roles. In the past, many teams utilized a backup quarterback as their holder on placekicks. A benefit of using quarterbacks as holders is that it would be easier to pull off a fake field goal attempt, but many coaches today prefer to use punters as holders because a punter will have far more time in practice sessions to work with the kicker than any quarterback would. In the Wildcat formation, where a halfback lines up behind the center and the quarterback lines up out wide, the quarterback can be used as a receiving target or a blocker. A more rare use for a quarterback is to punt the ball themself, a play known as a quick kick. Denver Broncos quarterback John Elway was known to perform quick kicks occasionally, typically when the Broncos were facing a third-and-long situation. Philadelphia Eagles quarterback Randall Cunningham, an All-America punter in college, was also known to punt the ball occasionally, and was assigned as the team's default punter for certain situations, such as when the team was backed up inside their own five-yard line.

As Roger Staubach's backup, Dallas Cowboys quarterback Danny White was also the team's punter, opening strategic possibilities for coach Tom Landry. Ascending to the starting role upon Staubach's retirement, White held his position as the team's punter for several seasons—a double duty he performed to All-American standard at Arizona State University. White also had two touchdown receptions as a Dallas Cowboy, both from the halfback option.

=== Special tactics ===
If quarterbacks are uncomfortable with the formation the defense is using, they may call an audible change to their play. For example, if a quarterback receives the call to execute a running play, but they notice that the defense is ready to blitz—that is, to send additional defenders across the line of scrimmage in an attempt to tackle the quarterback or short their ability to pass—the quarterback may want to change the play. To do this, the quarterback yells a special code, like "Blue 42" or "Texas 29", which tells the offense to switch to a specific play or formation.

Quarterbacks can also "spike" (throw the football at the ground) to stop the official game clock. For example, if a team is down by a field goal with only seconds remaining, a quarterback may spike the ball to prevent the game clock from running out. This usually allows the field goal unit to come onto the field, or attempt a final "Hail Mary pass". However, if a team is winning, a quarterback can keep the clock running by kneeling after the snap. This is normally done when the opposing team has no timeouts and there is little time left in the game, as it allows a team to burn up the remaining time on the clock without risking a turnover or injury.

=== Dual-threat quarterbacks ===
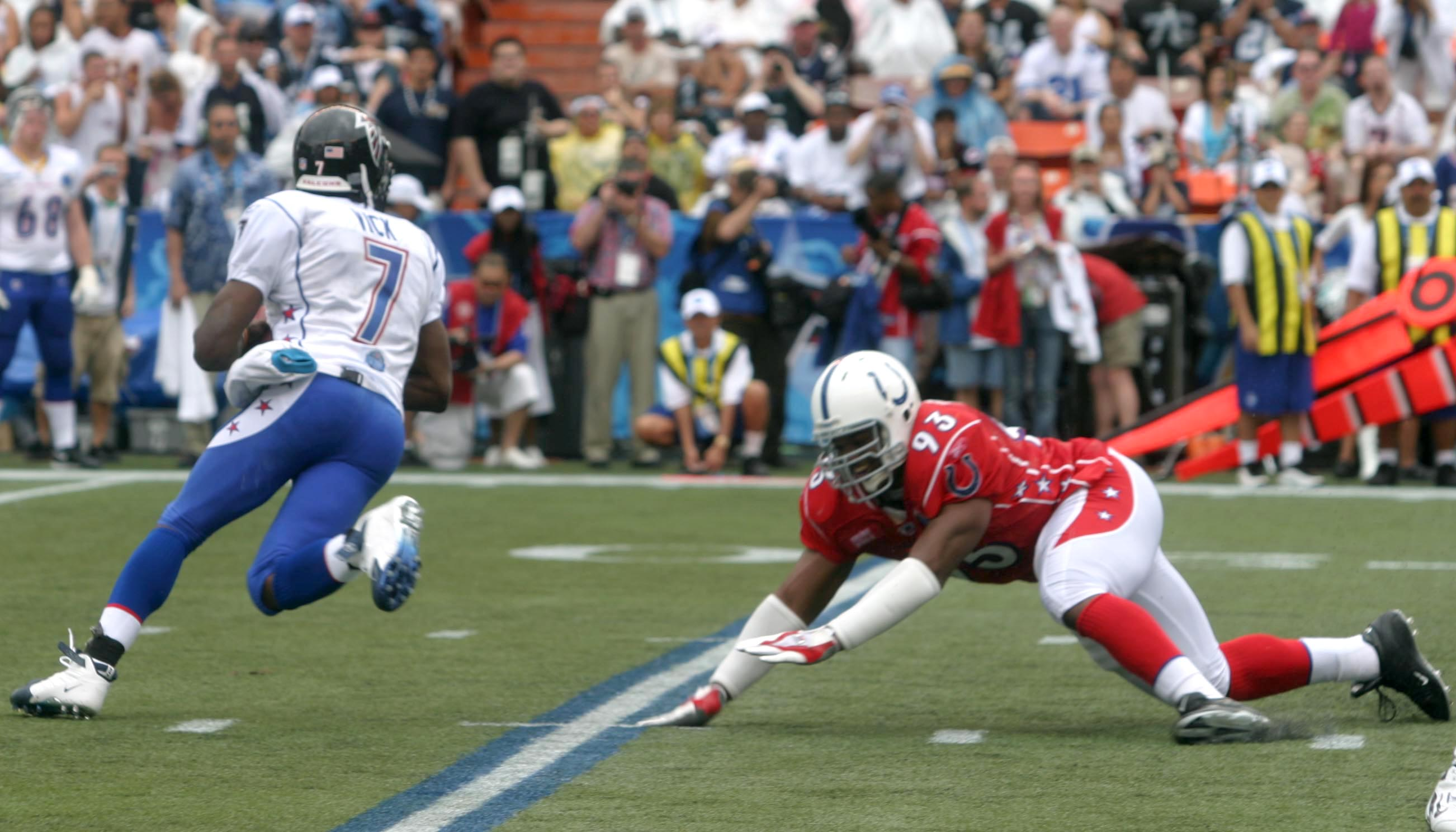
Michael Vick, a member of the NFC team at the NFL's 2006 Pro Bowl, uses his mobility to elude Hall of Fame edge rusher Dwight Freeney

A dual-threat quarterback possesses the skills and physique to run with the ball if necessary. With the rise of several blitz-heavy defensive schemes and increasingly faster defensive players, the importance of a mobile quarterback has been redefined. While arm power, accuracy, and pocket presence—the ability to successfully operate from within the "pocket" formed by his blockers—are still the most important quarterback virtues, the ability to elude or run past defenders creates an additional threat that allows greater flexibility in a team's passing and running game.

Dual-threat quarterbacks have historically been more prolific at the college level. Typically, a quarterback with exceptional quickness is used in an option offense, which allows the quarterback to hand the ball off, run it themself or pitch it to a running back shadowing them to the outside. This type of offense forces defenders to commit to the running back up the middle, the quarterback around the end or the running back trailing the quarterback. It is then that the quarterback has the "option" to identify which matchup is most favorable to the offense as the play unfolds and exploit that defensive weakness. In the college game, many schools employ several plays that are designed for the quarterback to run with the ball. This is much less common in professional football, except for a quarterback sneak, a play that involves the quarterback diving forward behind the offensive line to gain a small amount of yardage, but there is still an emphasis on being mobile enough to escape a heavy pass rush. Historically, high-profile dual-threat quarterbacks in the NFL were uncommon—among the notable exceptions were Steve Young and John Elway, who led their teams to one and five Super Bowl appearances respectively; and Michael Vick, whose rushing ability was a rarity in the early 2000s, although he never led his team to a Super Bowl. In the 2010s, quarterbacks with dual-threat capabilities have become more popular. Current NFL quarterbacks considered to be dual-threats include Russell Wilson, Lamar Jackson, and Josh Allen.

=== Two-quarterback system ===
Some teams employ a strategy that involves the use of more than one quarterback during the course of a game. This is more common at lower levels of football, such as high school or small college, but rare in major college or professional football.

There are four circumstances in which a two-quarterback system may be used.

The first is when a team is in the process of determining which quarterback will eventually be the starter, and may choose to use each quarterback for part of the game in order to compare the performances. For instance, the Seattle Seahawks' Pete Carroll used the preseason games in 2012 to select Russell Wilson as the starting quarterback over Matt Flynn and Tarvaris Jackson.

The second is a starter–reliever system, in which the starting quarterback splits the regular season playing time with the backup quarterback, although the former will start playoff games. This strategy is rare, and was last seen in the NFL in the "WoodStrock" combination of Don Strock and David Woodley, which took the Miami Dolphins to the Epic in Miami in 1982 and Super Bowl XVII the following year. The starter–reliever system is distinct from a one-off situation in which a starter is benched in favor of the backup because the switch is part of the game plan (usually if the starter is playing poorly for that game), and the expectation is that the two players will assume the same roles game after game.

The third is if a coach decides that the team has two quarterbacks who are equally effective and proceeds to rotate the quarterbacks at predetermined intervals, such as after each quarter or after each series. Southern California high school football team Corona Centennial operated this model during the 2014 football season, rotating quarterbacks after every series. In a game against the Chicago Bears in week 7 of the 1971 season, Dallas Cowboys head coach Tom Landry alternated Roger Staubach and Craig Morton on each play, sending in the quarterbacks with the playcall from the sideline.

The fourth, still occasionally seen in major-college football, is the use of different quarterbacks in different game or down-and-distance situations. Generally this involves a running quarterback and a passing quarterback in an option or wishbone offense. In Canadian football, quarterback sneaks or other runs in short-yardage situations tend to be successful as a result of the distance between the offensive and defensive lines being one yard. Drew Tate, a quarterback for the Calgary Stampeders, was primarily used in short-yardage situations and led the CFL in rushing touchdowns during the 2014 season with 10 scores as the backup to Bo Levi Mitchell. This strategy had all but disappeared from professional American football, but returned to some extent with the advent of the "wildcat" offense. There is debate within football circles as to the effectiveness of the so-called "two-quarterback system". Many coaches and media personnel remain skeptical of the model. Teams such as USC (Southern California), OSU (Oklahoma State), Northwestern and smaller West Georgia have utilized the two-quarterback system; West Georgia, for example, uses the system due to the skillsets of its quarterbacks. As recently as 2020, Oregon, who had two quarterbacks capable of starting (Boston College transfer Anthony Brown and sophomore Tyler Shough), utilized a similar tactic in the 2020 Pac-12 Football Championship Game, giving Shough the start but inserting the dual-threat Brown on short-yardage plays, red zone situations and the final drive of the game. Teams like these use this situation because of the advantages it gives them against defenses of the other team, so that the defense is unable to adjust to their gameplan.

== History ==
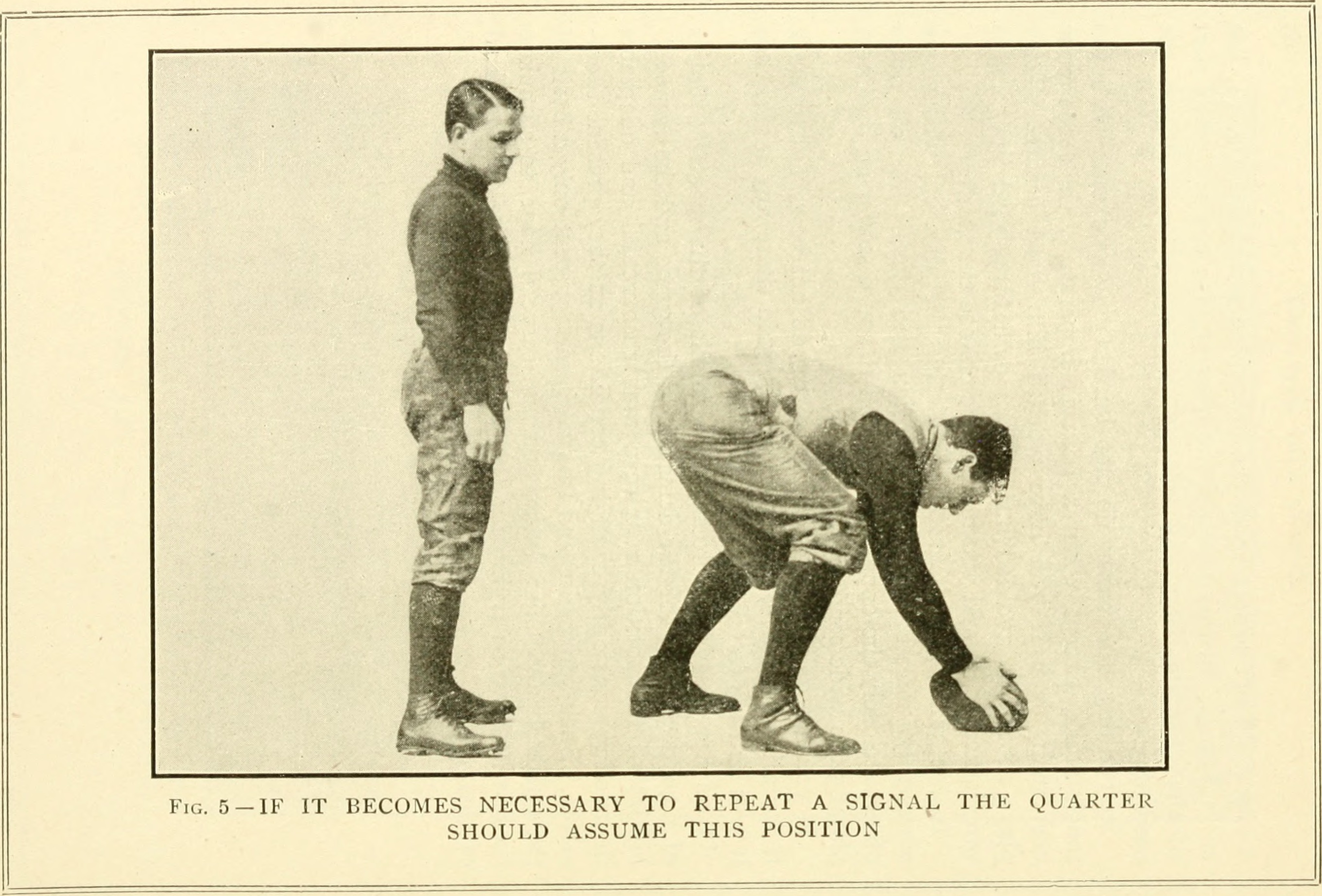
An illustration of a quarterback and center in Spalding's How to Play Foot Ball, published in 1902

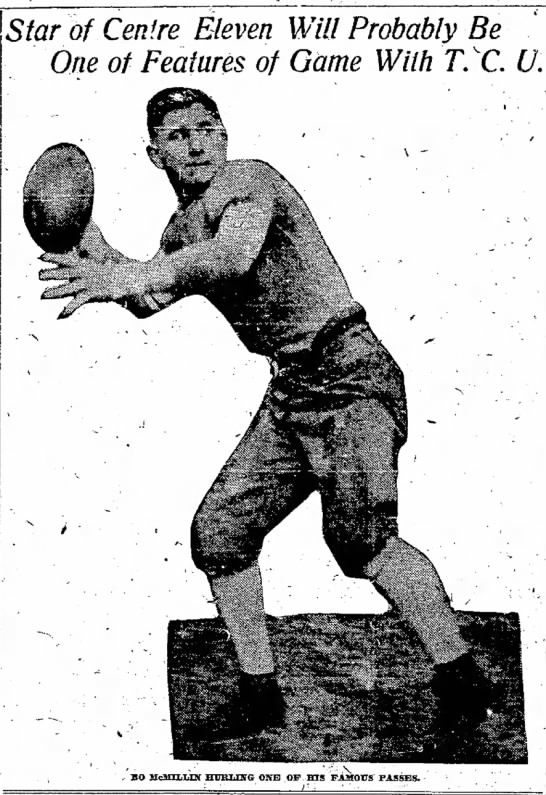
Bo McMillin tossing a pass

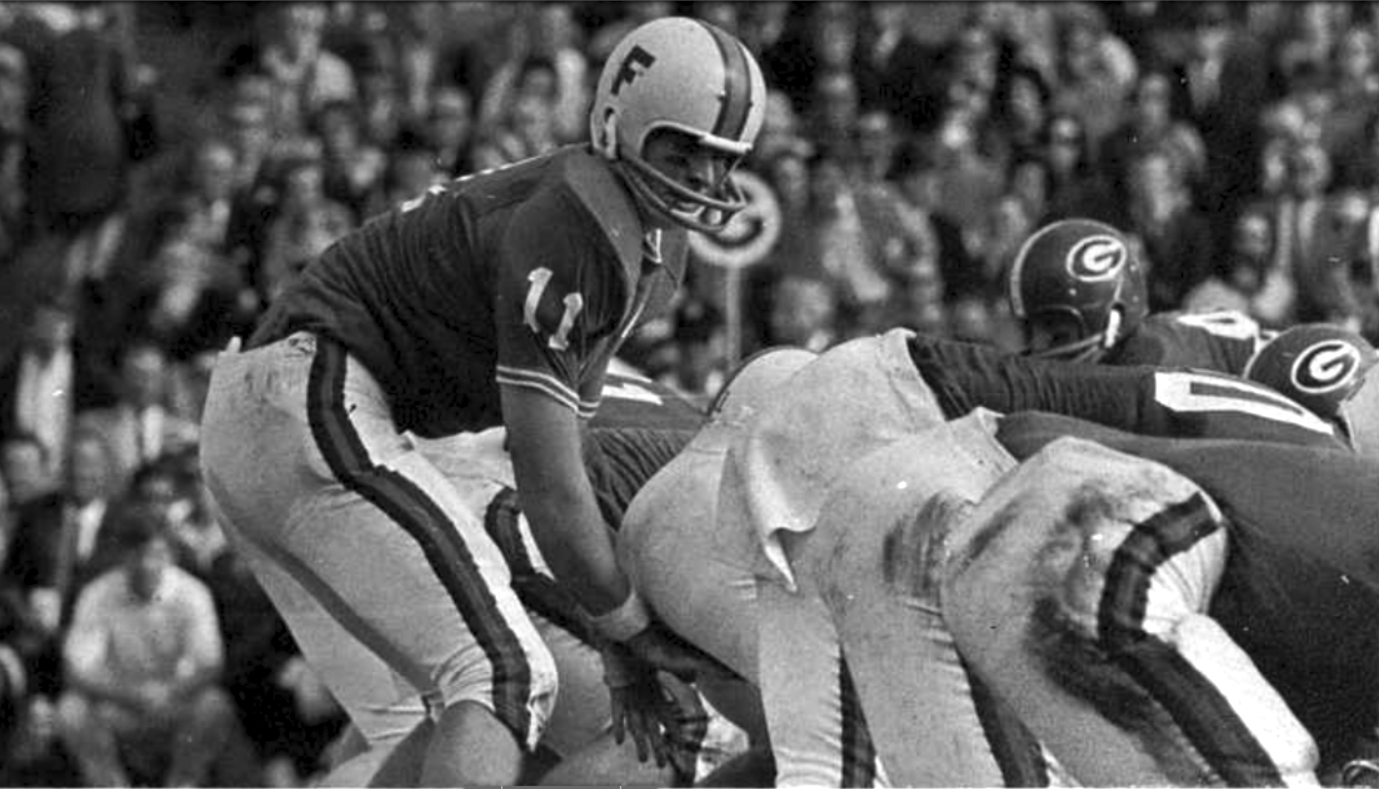
Steve Spurrier under center

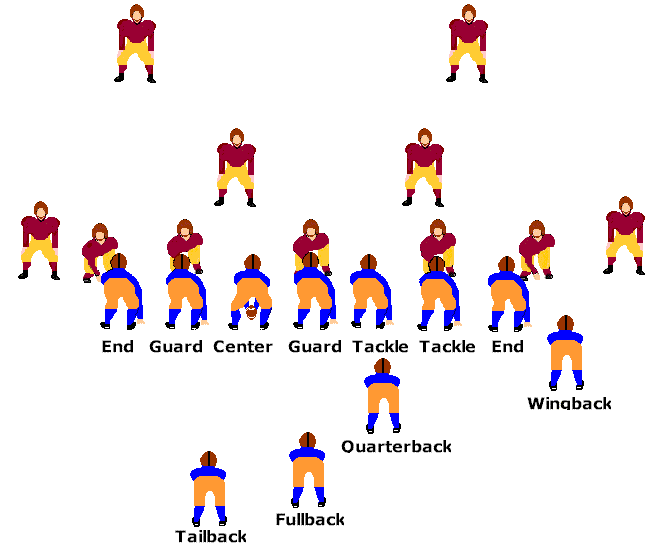
An image of the single-wing formation, a popular formation and offensive scheme created in the early 1900s. Like many early formations, the quarterback did not receive the ball from center, and instead served as a blocking back. In modern football, the single-wing is only used as a primary offense by a small number of high school teams.

The quarterback position dates to the late 1800s, when American Ivy League schools playing a form of rugby union imported from the United Kingdom began to put their own spin on the game. Walter Camp, a prominent athlete and rugby player at Yale University, pushed through a change in rules at a meeting in 1880 that established a line of scrimmage and allowed for the football to be snapped to a quarterback. The change was meant to allow for teams to strategize their play more thoroughly and retain possession more easily than was possible in the chaos of a scrummage in rugby. In Camp's formulation, the "quarter-back" was the person who received a ball snapped back with another player's foot. Originally he was not allowed to run forward of the line of scrimmage:

A scrimmage takes place when the holder of the ball puts it on the ground before him and puts it in play while on-side either by kicking the ball or by snapping it back with his foot. The man who first receives the ball from the snap-back shall be called the quarter-back and shall not rush forward with the ball under penalty of foul.

— Walter Camp, rule adopted at Springfield, Massachusetts Intercollegiate Football Association convention, 1880

In the primary formation of Camp's time, there were four "back" positions, with the tailback playing furthest back, followed by the fullback, the halfback, and the quarterback closest to the line. As the quarterback was not allowed to run past the line of scrimmage, and the forward pass had not yet been invented, their primary role was to receive the snap from the center, and immediately hand or toss the ball backwards to the fullback or halfback to run. By the early 1900s, their role had been further reduced, as teams began to employ longer, direct snaps to one of the other backs (who by rule were allowed to run) and the quarterback became the primary "blocking back", leading the way through the defense but rarely carrying the ball themselves. This was the primary strategy of the single wing offense which was popular during the early decades of the 20th century. After the growth of the forward pass, the role of the quarterback changed again. The quarterback would later be returned to his role as the primary receiver of the snap after the advent of the T-formation offense, especially under the success of former single wing tailback, and later T-formation quarterback, Sammy Baugh.

The requirement to stay behind the line of scrimmage was soon rescinded, but it was later reimposed in six-man football. The exchange between the person snapping the ball, typically the center, and the quarterback was initially an awkward one because it involved a kick. At first, centers gave the ball a small boot, and then picked it up and handed it to the quarterback. By 1889, Yale center Bert Hanson was bouncing the ball on the ground to the quarterback between his legs. The following year, a rule change officially made snapping the ball using the hands between the legs legal. Several years later, Amos Alonzo Stagg at the University of Chicago invented the lift-up snap: the center passed the ball off the ground and between his legs to a standing quarterback. A similar set of changes were later adopted in Canadian football as part of the Burnside rules, a set of rules proposed by John Meldrum "Thrift" Burnside, the captain of the University of Toronto's football team.

The change from a scrummage to a scrimmage made it easier for teams to decide what plays they would run before the snap. At first, the captains of college teams were put in charge of play calling, indicating with shouted codes which players would run with the ball and how the men on the line were supposed to block. Yale later used visual signals, including adjustments of the captain's knit hat, to call plays. Centers could also signal plays based on the alignment of the ball before the snap. In 1888, however, Princeton University began to have its quarterback call plays using number signals. That system caught on and quarterbacks began to act as directors and organizers of offensive play.

Early on, quarterbacks were used in a variety of formations. Harvard's team put seven men on the line of scrimmage, with three halfbacks who alternated at quarterback and a lone fullback. Princeton put six men on the line and had one designated quarterback, while Yale used seven linemen, one quarterback and two halfbacks who lined up on either side of the fullback. This was the origin of the T-formation, an offensive set that remained in use for many decades afterward and gained popularity in professional football starting in the 1930s.

In 1906, the forward pass was legalized in American football; Canadian football did not adopt the forward pass until 1929. Despite the legalization of the forward pass, the most popular formations of the early 20th century focused mostly on the rushing game. The single-wing formation, a run-oriented offensive set, was invented by football coach Glenn "Pop" Warner around the year 1908. In the single-wing, the quarterback was positioned behind the line of scrimmage and was flanked by a tailback, fullback and wingback. He served largely as a blocking back; the tailback typically took the snap, either running forward with the ball or making a lateral pass to one of the other players in the backfield. The quarterback's job was usually to make blocks upfield to help the tailback or fullback gain yards. Passing plays were rare in the single-wing, an unbalanced power formation where four linemen lined up to one side of the center and two lined up to the other. The tailback was the focus of the offense, and was often a triple-threat man who would either pass, run or kick the ball.

Offensive play calling continued to focus on rushing up through the 1920s, when professional leagues began to challenge the popularity of college football. In the early days of the professional National Football League (NFL), which was founded in 1920, games were largely low-scoring affairs. Two-thirds of all games in the 1920s were shutouts, and quarterbacks/tailbacks usually passed only out of desperation. In addition to a reluctance to risk turnovers by passing, various rules existed that limited the effectiveness of the forward pass: passers were required to drop back five yards behind the line of scrimmage before they could attempt a pass, and incomplete passes in the end zone resulted in a change of possession and a touchback. Additionally, the rules required the ball to be snapped from the location on the field where it was ruled dead; if a play ended with a player going out of bounds, the center had to snap the ball from the sideline, an awkward place to start a play.

Despite these constraints, player-coach Curly Lambeau of the Green Bay Packers, along with several other NFL figures of his era, was a consistent proponent of the forward pass. The Packers found success in the 1920s and 1930s using variations on the single-wing that emphasized the passing game. Packers quarterback Red Dunn and New York Giants and Brooklyn Dodgers quarterback Benny Friedman were the leading passers of their era, but passing remained a relative rarity among other teams; between 1920 and 1932, there were three times as many running plays as there were passing plays.

Early NFL quarterbacks typically were responsible for calling the team's offensive plays with signals before the snap. The use of the huddle to call plays originated with Stagg in 1896, but only began to be used regularly in college games in 1921. In the NFL, players were typically assigned numbers, as were the gaps between offensive linemen. One player, usually the quarterback, would call signals indicating which player was to run the ball and which gap he would run toward. Playcalling (or any other kind of coaching from the sidelines) was not permitted during this period, leaving the quarterback to devise the offensive strategy (often, the quarterback doubled as head coach during this era). Substitutions were limited and quarterbacks often played on both offense and defense.

Between 1933 and 1945, numerous changes for the quarterback position were applied. The rule requiring a quarterback/tailback to be five yards behind the line of scrimmage to pass was abolished, and hash marks were added to the field that established a limited zone between which the ball was placed before snaps, making offensive formations more flexible. Additionally, incomplete passes in the end zone were no longer counted as turnovers and touchbacks.

The single-wing continued to be in wide use throughout this, and a number of forward-passing tailbacks became stars, including Sammy Baugh of the Washington Redskins. In 1939, University of Chicago head football coach Clark Shaughnessy made modifications to the T-formation, a formation that put the quarterback behind the center and had him receive the snap directly. Shaughnessy altered the formation by having the linemen be spaced further apart, and he began having players go in motion behind the line of scrimmage before the snap to confuse defenses. These changes were picked up by Chicago Bears coach George Halas, a close friend of Shaughnessy, and they quickly caught on in the professional ranks. Utilizing the T-formation and led by quarterback Sid Luckman, the Bears reached the NFL championship game in 1940 and beat the Redskins by a score of 73–0. The blowout led other teams across the league to adopt variations on the T-formation, including the Philadelphia Eagles, Cleveland Rams and Detroit Lions. Baugh and the Redskins converted to the T-formation and continued to succeed.

Thanks in part to the emergence of the T-formation and changes in the rulebooks to liberalize the passing game, passing from the quarterback position became more common in the 1940s and as teams switched to the T-formation, passing tailbacks, such as Sammy Baugh, would line up as quarterbacks instead. Over the course of the decade, passing yards began to exceed rushing yards for the first time in the history of football. The Cleveland Browns of the late 1940s in the All-America Football Conference (AAFC), a professional league created to challenge the NFL, were one of the teams of that era that relied most on passing. Quarterback Otto Graham helped the Browns win four AAFC championships in the late 1940s in head coach Paul Brown's T-formation offense, which emphasized precision timing passes. Cleveland, along with several other AAFC teams, was absorbed by the NFL in 1950 after the dissolution of the AAFC that same year. By the end of the 1940s, all NFL teams aside from the Pittsburgh Steelers used the T-formation as their primary offensive formation.

As late as the 1960s, running plays occurred more frequently than passes. NFL quarterback Milt Plum later stated that during his career (1957–1969) passes typically only occurred on third downs and sometimes on first downs. Quarterbacks only increased in importance as rules changed to favor passing and higher scoring and as football gained popularity on television after the 1958 NFL Championship Game, often referred to as "The Greatest Game Ever Played". Early modern offenses evolved around the quarterback as a passing threat, boosted by rules changes in 1978 and 1979 that made it a penalty for defensive backs to interfere with receivers downfield and allowed offensive linemen to pass-block using their arms and open hands; the rules had limited them to blocking with their hands held to their chests. Average passing yards per game rose from 283.3 in 1977 to 408.7 in 1979.

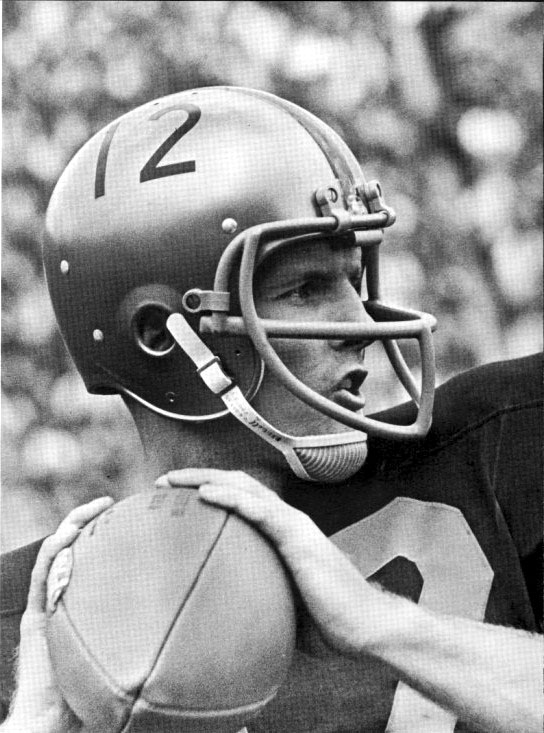
Bob Griese

The NFL continues to be a pass-heavy league, in part due to further rule changes that prescribed harsher penalties for hitting the quarterback and for hitting defenseless receivers as they awaited passes. Passing in wide-open offenses has also been an emphasis at the high school and college levels, and professional coaches have devised schemes to fit the talents of new generations of quarterbacks.

While quarterbacks and team captains usually called plays in football's early years, today coaches often decide which plays the offense will run. Some teams use an offensive coordinator, an assistant coach whose duties include offensive game-planning and often play-calling. In the NFL, coaches are allowed to communicate with quarterbacks and call plays using audio equipment built into the player's helmet. Quarterbacks are allowed to hear, but not talk to, their coaches until there are fifteen seconds left on the play clock. Once the quarterback receives the call, he may relay it to other players via signals or in a huddle.

Dallas Cowboys head coach Tom Landry was an early advocate of taking play calling out of the quarterback's hands. Although this remained a common practice in the NFL through the 1970s, fewer QBs were doing it by the 1980s and even Hall of Famers like Joe Montana did not call their own plays. Buffalo Bills QB Jim Kelly was one of the last to regularly call plays. Peyton Manning, formerly of the Indianapolis Colts and Denver Broncos, was the best modern example of a quarterback who called his own plays, primary using an uptempo, no-huddle-based attack. Manning had almost complete control over the offense. Former Baltimore Ravens quarterback Joe Flacco retained a high degree of control over the offense as well, particularly when running a no-huddle scheme, as did Ben Roethlisberger of the Pittsburgh Steelers.

== Race ==
Throughout football history, the racial makeup of quarterbacks did not reflect the racial makeup of the sport. Black quarterbacks especially faced barriers in breaking into the starting job at the highest levels. The first black starting quarterback in the Super Bowl era was Marlin Briscoe in 1968, who started for the American Football League's Denver Broncos during part of one season; he was later converted to wide receiver. James Harris started several games for the Buffalo Bills after the AFL-NFL merger, and later started games for the Los Angeles Rams. Other early NFL black starting quarterbacks include Joe Gilliam of the Pittsburgh Steelers, who was the first black quarterback to start a season for any NFL team; though he was benched after the first six games.

During the 2013 NFL season, 67 percent of NFL players were African American yet only 17 percent of quarterbacks were; 82 percent of quarterbacks were white, with just one percent of quarterbacks from other races. Since the inception of the game, only four quarterbacks with known black ancestry have led their team to a Super Bowl victory: Doug Williams in 1988, Russell Wilson, who is multiracial, in 2014, Patrick Mahomes (biracial) in 2020, 2023, and 2024 and Jalen Hurts in 2025. However, numerous quarterbacks with African ancestry did start the Super Bowl since the 2010s, including four in a row (Super Bowl XLVII, Super Bowl XLVIII, Super Bowl XLIX, Super Bowl 50). Quarterbacks with known black ancestry have also won the Associated Press NFL Most Valuable Player Award in recent years, including Cam Newton, Patrick Mahomes, and Lamar Jackson.

Some black quarterbacks claim to have experienced bias towards or against them due to their race. Despite his ability to both pass and run effectively, current Cleveland Browns signal-caller Deshaun Watson despises being called a dual-threat quarterback because he believes the term is often used to stereotype black quarterbacks.

Super Bowl LVII was the first Super Bowl in history where each starting quarterback (Jalen Hurts and Patrick Mahomes, who is biracial) was black.

== See also ==
- Passer rating
- Playmaker - an association football type of player with similar roles to a quarterback

Achievements:

- List of quarterbacks with multiple Super Bowl wins
- List of National Football League career passing touchdowns leaders
- List of National Football League career quarterback wins leaders
- List of gridiron football quarterbacks passing statistics

Diversity:

- List of black NFL quarterbacks
- List of left-handed quarterbacks

Strategy and related positions:

- Game manager
- System quarterback
- Half back
- Three quarter back
- Fullback

== Bibliography ==
- Bernstein, Mark F. (2001). Football: The Ivy League Origins of an American Obsession. Philadelphia: University of Pennsylvania Press. ISBN 978-0-812-23627-9.
- Long, Howie; Czarnecki, John (2011). Football for Dummies. Hoboken, NJ: For Dummies. ISBN 978-1-118-01261-1.
- Maxymuk, John (2007). Strong Arm Tactics: A Historical and Statistical Analysis of the Professional Quarterback. Jefferson, NC: McFarland. ISBN 978-0-786-43277-6.
- Peterson, Robert W. (1997). Pigskin: The Early Years of Pro Football. Oxford: Oxford University Press. ISBN 978-0-195-11913-8.
