= 2023 Helvetic Guards season =

American football team in Switzerland

- General manager: Toni Zöller
- Head coach: Norm Chow
- Home stadium: Lidl Arena Wil

The 2023 Helvetic Guards season is the inaugural season of the newly founded Helvetic Guards in the European League of Football for the 2023 season.

== Preseason ==
After the Guards were unveiled at a press conference, the franchise began to organize itself for their first season. On October 30, 2022, the front office announced that they will play their home games in the Lidl Arena in Wil, Switzerland, about 25 miles (40km) eastern of Zürich.

As the first head coach of the franchise, former NFL Tennessee Titans offensive coordinator Norm Chow was presented.

With the signings of Collin Hill and 2014 Baylor Bears football team standout Silas Nacita, the franchise recruited standout players in Europe. Notable homegrown signings were of Philipp Leimgruber, former Schwingen player.

== Regular season ==
=== Standings ===
Central Conference
Pos	Team	GP	W	L	CONF	PF	PA	DIFF	STK	Qualification
1	(Germany) Stuttgart Surge	12	10	2	8–2	387	237	+150	W3	Automatic playoffs (#3)
2	(Austria) Raiders Tirol	12	8	4	8–2	307	230	+77	W1	
3	(Germany) Munich Ravens	12	7	5	7–3	425	338	+87	W2	
4	(Switzerland) Helvetic Guards	12	3	9	3–7	174	378	–204	L4	
5	(Italy) Milano Seamen	12	2	10	2–8	328	497	–169	L3	
6	(Spain) Barcelona Dragons	12	2	10	2–8	199	396	–197	L10	

Source: europeanleague.football

== Roster ==
Helvetic Guards roster
Quarterbacks: Collin Hill (United States); Richard Wartmann (Switzerland); Running backs: Kevin Audétat (Switzerland); Dmitri Gfeller (Switzerland); Ibony Mbungu (Switzerland); Silas Nacita (United States); Moritz Stein (Switzerland); Wide receivers: Cayman Bailey Jr. (Switzerland); Xavier Baudraz (Switzerland); Gregorio Calonego (Italy); Timo Hager (Switzerland); Anton Jallai (Sweden); David Marty (Germany); Pascal Rüegg (Switzerland); Tight ends: Igor Mašlanka (Slovakia); Theo Stirnimann (Switzerland)	Offensive linemen: Federico Ferretti (Switzerland); Wilson Ferretti (Switzerland); Pascal Hollenstein (Switzerland); Filip Kovljenic (Switzerland); Amos Laoye (Belgium); Niels Meier (Switzerland); Matthias Münger (Switzerland); Gabriel Rodriguez (Spain); Timothy Schmid (Switzerland); Jürg Stalder (Switzerland); Raffael Wachter (Switzerland); Defensive linemen: Abdur-Rahman Elabed (Switzerland); Yannick Friedberg (Switzerland); Tim Hänni (Switzerland); Philipp Leimgruber (Switzerland); Dominik Liechti (Switzerland); Emmanuel Kabengele (Democratic Republic of the Congo); Michael Kimpiabi (Switzerland); Milos Panic (Switzerland); Michel Sousa (Switzerland); Luca Steiner (Switzerland); Dalibor Vuckovic (Switzerland)	Linebackers: Andreas Buri (Switzerland); Julien Conus (Switzerland); Jonathan Falk (Switzerland); Adrian Fiedler (Germany); Fabio Rothmund (Switzerland); Timothy Schürmann (Switzerland); Fabian Strahm (Switzerland); J. R. Tavai (United States); Ludovic Vincent (Switzerland); Defensive backs: Labinot Arapi (Switzerland); Macéo Beard (France); Fabian Bruhin (Switzerland); Ken Hike (United States); Olivier Marty (Germany); Dominic Mischler (Switzerland); Chaska Rémy Perron (France); Hendrik Rutishauser (Switzerland); Florian Ziegler (Switzerland); Special teams: Nils Jonkmans (Switzerland)	Rookies in italics Roster updated 14 February 2023; 4 A-import, 6 E-import, 47 homegrown 57 active

== Staff ==
Helvetic Guards staff
Front office: Owner – Mukadder Erdönmez; General Manager – Toni Zöller; Head of football operations – Zeki Öztürk; Head of administration – Ferhat Kahraman; Head coach: Head coach – Norm Chow; Offensive coaches: Offensive coordinator – n/a; Quarterbacks – n/a; Running backs – Darius Willis; Wide receivers – Mike Wilson; Tight ends – Pete Metzelaars; Offensive line – Bob Palcic; Offensive assistant – Rudy Fonkoue, Christian Warzecha	Defensive coaches: Defensive coordinator – Jim Ward; Defensive line – n/a; Linebackers – Don Clemons; Defensive backs – n/a; Defensive assistant – Khaled Bassyouny, Armin Waldherr, Chris Krattiger; Special teams coaches: Special teams coordinator – Pete Metzelaars; Special teams coach – Glenn Chase; Strength and conditioning: Athletic Director – Matt Hammer, J.C. Williams; Staff updated 14 February 2023
