= Tavai (surname) =

Tavai is a surname. Notable people with the surname include:

- Etuate Tavai (died 1999), Fijian politician, 31st Attorney General of Fiji
- J. R. Tavai (born 1993), Samoan-American football defensive lineman
- Jahlani Tavai (born 1996), Samoan-American football linebacker
- Jonah Tavai (born 2000), Samoan-American football player
- Justus Tavai (born 1998), American football player
