= 2023 Munich Ravens season =

American football team in Germany

- Owner: Christian Binder, Thomas Krohne
- General manager: Sebastian Stolz
- Head coach: John Shoop
- Defensive coordinator: Vince Okruch
- Home stadium: Sportpark Unterhaching

Results
- Record: 7-5
- Conference place: 3rd (Central Conference)
- Playoffs: did not qualify

Uniform

The 2023 Munich Ravens season is the inaugural season of the newly founded Munich Ravens in the European League of Football for the 2023 season.

== Preseason ==
The first steps of the franchise was the hiring of former Hamburg Sea Devils offensive quality control coach and NFL (Oakland Raiders, Carolina Panthers) offensive coordinator John Shoop and general manager Sebastian Stolz, former PR-manager of the Hamburg Sea Devils in the NFL Europa and strategy manager for the Oakland Raiders. Another important hiring was the addition of the newly director of sport, former Raiders Tirol quarterback and MVP of the 2022 European League of Football season Sean Shelton.

In preparation for the new season, the franchise held an invitational tryout at the Olympiastadion (Munich) with several dozen participants. After that, the first signings of players were announced, beginning with former Panthers Wrocław Darius Robinson. As the first franchise quarterback Chad Jeffries was announced, coming from the Danube Dragons as Austrian title winner and league MVP.

== Regular season ==
=== Standings ===
Central Conference
Pos	Team	GP	W	L	CONF	PF	PA	DIFF	STK	Qualification
1	(Germany) Stuttgart Surge	12	10	2	8–2	387	237	+150	W3	Automatic playoffs (#3)
2	(Austria) Raiders Tirol	12	8	4	8–2	307	230	+77	W1	
3	(Germany) Munich Ravens	12	7	5	7–3	425	338	+87	W2	
4	(Switzerland) Helvetic Guards	12	3	9	3–7	174	378	–204	L4	
5	(Italy) Milano Seamen	12	2	10	2–8	328	497	–169	L3	
6	(Spain) Barcelona Dragons	12	2	10	2–8	199	396	–197	L10	

Source: europeanleague.football

=== Schedule ===
Week	Date	Opponent (Note: Intra-Conference opponents are in italics)	Result	Record	Venue	Att.	Recap
1	June 4	Raiders Tirol	38-59	0–1	Sportpark Unterhaching	6283	
2	bye						
3	June 18	at Helvetic Guards	39-10	1-1	Lidl Arena, Wil	2050	
4	June 24	at Barcelona Dragons	39-15	2-1	Estadi Olímpic de Terrassa	1128	
5	July 2	Stuttgart Surge	9-28	2–2	Sportpark Unterhaching	5184	
6	July 9	at Rhein Fire	25-29	2–3	Schauinsland-Reisen-Arena, Duisburg	7562	
7	July 16	Milano Seamen	56-37	3-3	Sportpark Unterhaching	4028	
8	July 22	at Raiders Tirol	24-25	3-4	Tivoli Stadion Tirol, Innsbruck	3447	
9	July 30	Helvetic Guards	35-6	4-4	Sportpark Unterhaching	4345	
10	bye						
11	August 13	at Stuttgart Surge	32-30	5–4	Gazi-Stadion auf der Waldau, Stuttgart	4732	
12	August 20	Rhein Fire	23-60	5-5	Sportpark Unterhaching	5011	
13	August 26	at Milano Seamen	50-29	6-5	Velodromo Vigorelli, Milan	700	
14	September 3	Barcelona Dragons	55-0	7-5	Sportpark Unterhaching	5204	

Source: elfdata.eu

== Roster ==
Munich Ravens roster
Quarterbacks: 12 Chad Jeffries (United States); 16 Lukas Von Stumpfeldt (Germany); Running backs: 20 Rachid ALi-Tagba (Germany); 22 Alex Braunsperger (Germany); 7 Tomiwa Oyewo (Nigeria); 44 Niklas Ritter FB (Germany); 33 Justin Rodney (Germany); Wide receivers: 80 Lukas Anzeneder (Germany); 8 Noah Bomba (Germany); 2 Markell Castle (United States); 1 Sixten Dragan (Germany); 18 Jannik Nowak (Germany); 17 Mo Riedinger (Germany); 13 Marvin Rutsch (Germany); 14 Jason Sanders (Germany); 11 Luca Salvo (Germany); 28 Leander Winter (Germany); Tight ends: 81 Sebastian Kurrer (Germany); 85 Marlon Malki (Germany); 82 Philip Okonkwo (Germany); 88 Jens Walter (Germany)	Offensive linemen: 60 Marvin Biegert (Germany); -- Gerrit Brandt (Germany); 65 Jan Eberl (Germany); 71 Marco Fischer (Germany); 73 Thomas Heller (Germany); 55 Nathan Kalemba (Germany); 53 Dominik Ondra (Germany); 72 Maxime Roussl (France); 75 Thomas Schmidt (Germany); 50 Tobias Vorreiter (Germany); 70 Philip Weinzierl (Germany); Defensive linemen: 92 Johannes Bräu (Germany); 98 Etuale Liu (New Zealand); 97 Bilal Mawuena (Germany); 94 MJ Ricco (Germany); 93 Robin Rogoss (Germany); 49 Patrick Roth (Germany); 95 Leon Schmidt (Germany); 90 Dominic Siegel (Germany); 35 Tyler Vaimaona (New Zealand); 45 Tizian Vogl (Germany); 49 Maximillian Von Engelhardt (Germany); 91 Leon Weber (Germany); 56 Vladislav Zarkov (Germany); 15 Johannes Zirngibl (Germany)	Linebackers: 40 Joshua Akena (Sweden); 52 Michael Bausch (Germany); 58 Burak Efendioglu (Germany); 10 Nic Haritonenko (Germany); 35 Exree Loe (United States); 51 Leon Nieper (Germany); 37 Jan-Niclas Rung (Germany); 9 Kevin Titz (Germany); Defensive backs: 27 Joschka Bartz (Germany); 24 Jonas Gürntke (Germany); 37 Gabriel Kalus (Germany); 39 Enis Kaser (Germany); 28 Blake King (Australia); 32 Julian Ludwig-Mayorga (Germany); 21 Martin Marcacci (Italy); 6 Luis Moreno (Germany); 19 Junior Nkembi (Germany); 3 Justin Rogers (United States); 8 Darius Saint-Robinson (United States); 25 Moritz Scharr (Germany); Special teams: 4 Robert Werner (Germany)	Rookies in italics Roster updated November 21, 2023; 4 A-import, 7 E-import, 56 homegrown 67 active

== Staff ==
Munich Ravens staff
Front office: Owners – Christian Binder, Thomas Krohne; General manager – Sebastian Stolz; Director Sports Operations – Sean Shelton; Head coach: Head coach – John Shoop; Offensive coaches: Offensive coordinator – n/a; Quarterbacks – TeeJay Gordan; Offensive line – Paul Dunn; Running backs – Tristan Müller; Wide receivers – Tarik Ibrahim; Tight ends – Maximilian Feruga	Defensive coaches: Defensive coordinator – Vince Okruch; Defensive backs – Alan Reed; Linebacker – Ryan Newell; Defensive line – Gunther Renner; Special teams coaches: Kick-Off/ Kick-Off Return coordinator – Tristan Müller; Punt/ Punt Return coordinator – Maximilian Feruga; Field Goal/ PAT coordinator – Valentin Pfnür; Field Goal/ PAT block coordinator – Ryan Newell; Strength and conditioning: Head strength and conditioning – Ryan Newell; Staff updated 28 January 2023
