= Bert Hill (American football) =

American football player and coach (born 1958)

Helvetic Guards
- Title: Defensive line coach

Personal information
- Born: January 25, 1958 (age 68); Montgomery, Alabama

Career history

Playing
- Marion Military Institute (1976-1977); Wichita State University (1978)

Coaching
- Texas A&M Aggies football (1984–1986, 1989) Head strength & conditioning coach; Ohio State Buckeyes (1988) Head strength & conditioning coach; Detroit Lions (1990–2001) Strength & conditioning, asst. DL/OL coach; Miami Dolphins (2005–2007) Strength & conditioning; SMU Mustangs football (2008–2014) DL coach; Montreal Alouettes (2018) DL coach; Tampa Bay Vipers (2020) DL coach; Helvetic Guards (2023–present) DL coach

Lawrence Hubert Hill, Jr. (born January 25, 1958, in Montgomery, Alabama) is an American football coach and former player. He is currently the defensive line coach for the Helvetic Guards in the European League of Football.

== Early life and playing career ==
Hill started playing football as a first grader in the local YMCA league. He later played as a linebacker for the Sidney Lanier High School where he graduated in 1976. His collegiate career started at Marion Military Institute, before transferring to Wichita State University and finished out his playing career in 1978.

== Coaching career ==
Hill started his coaching career in 1979 as defensive coordinator at Cloverdale Junior High in his hometown Montgomery, Alabama.

=== College football ===
His first station as a coach led Hill to the Texas A&M football program, where he coached players like Jeroy Robinson. While he was on the staff, the Aggies won three straight Southwest Conference titles (1985-87). After the 86/87 season, Hill had a one-year stint with the Ohio State football program in 88. For the 89 season, he came back to the Aggies to finish with a 8–4 record and a No. 20 ranking overall.

In 2008 he was hired as the DL coach for the SMU Mustang football program under June Jones. There he had numerous achievements and successful seasons with the Mustangs, having four consecutive bowl seasons and multiple bowl wins. He also helped in recruiting and training efforts for Margus Hunt and Taylor Thompson.

=== Detroit Lions ===
Hill joined the Lions as the team's strength and conditioning coach in 1990 under Wayne Fontes. He has held this position for over a decade, working with the team to improve the strength, speed, and overall physical condition of its players. In 1998 he also began to coach the offensive line as an assistant, where he previously coached the defensive line too.

=== Miami Dolphins ===
After a break from coaching, Hill was hired as the strength and conditioning coach for the Miami Dolphins in 2005. In his time till 2007, the Dolphins had a record of 16–32. Following his engagement with the Dolphins, he coached college football teams again.

=== Helvetic Guards ===
In August 2022, Chow was named the first head coach of the Helvetic Guards ahead of their first season in the European League of Football.

=== Other professional teams ===
In 2018 he coached in the Canadian football team Montreal Alouettes and in 2020 the Tampa Bay Vipers of the XFL, both in the function as a defensive line coach.

== Personal life ==
Hill is the second of three children of Lawrence and Mary Etta Hill. Hill received his bachelor's degree in physical education from Auburn University at Montgomery and a Master's of Science degree in exercise science with an emphasis in strength physiology from Auburn University. Between his time as coach at the Lions and Dolphins he was Director of Endorsements at AdvoCare.

He is also the author of a publication for football specific training.

=== Written works ===
- Conditioning: How to Get in Football Shape (2003) – ISBN 9781422366745
