= Jonah Tavai =

American gridiron football player (born 2000)

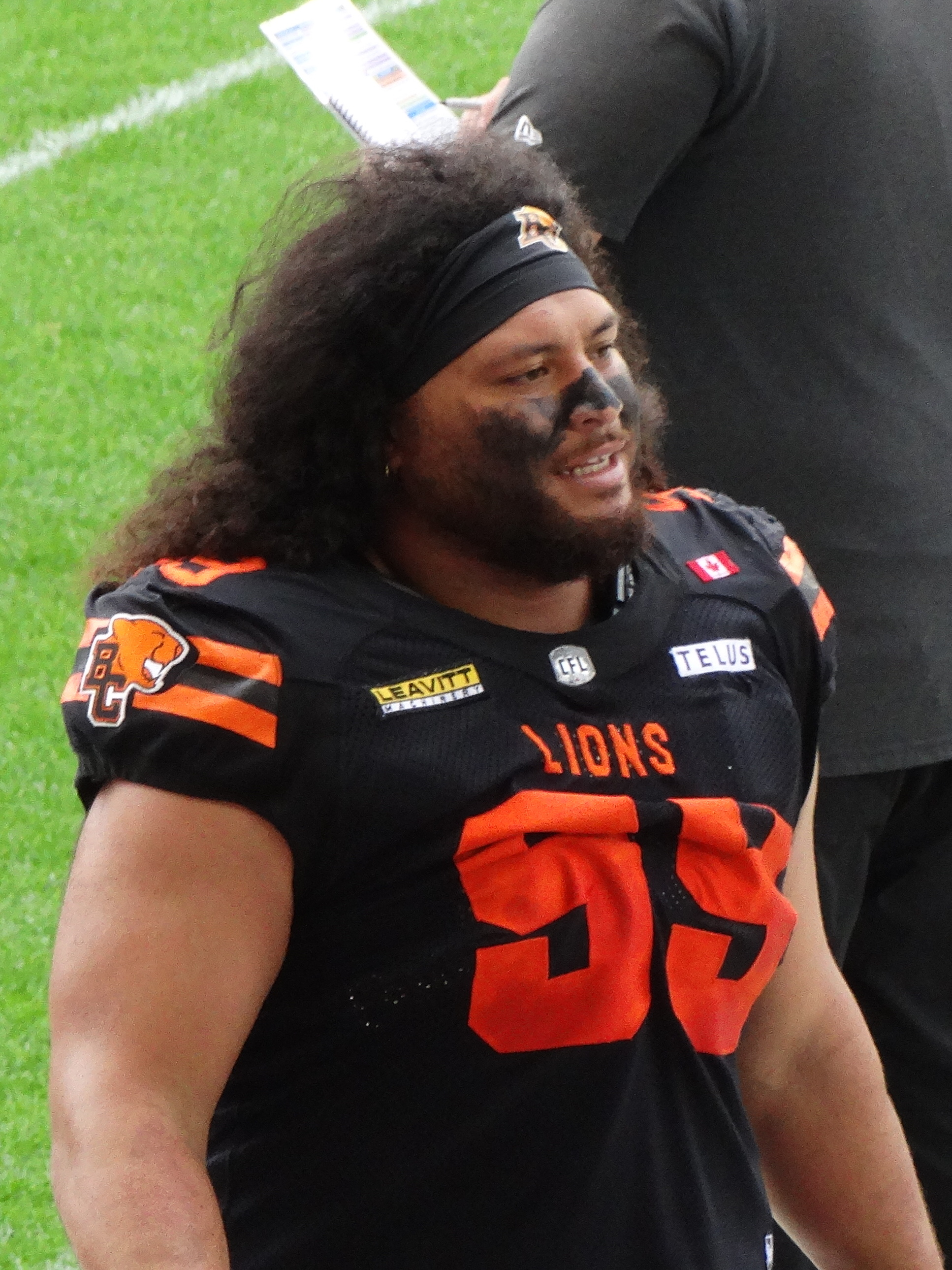
- Tavai with the BC Lions in 2025

No. 99 – BC Lions
- Position: Defensive end
- Roster status: Active
- CFL status: American

Personal information
- Born: December 13, 2000 (age 25); Inglewood, California, U.S.
- Listed height: 5 ft 10 in (1.78 m)
- Listed weight: 283 lb (128 kg)

Career information
- High school: Mira Costa (Manhattan Beach, California)
- College: San Diego State (2019–2023)
- NFL draft: 2023: undrafted

Career history
- Seattle Seahawks (2023)*; BC Lions (2024–present)
- * Offseason or practice squad member only

Awards and highlights
- First-team All-Mountain West (2022)
- Stats at Pro Football Reference
- Stats at CFL.ca

Jonah Tavai (born December 13, 2000) is an American professional football defensive end for the BC Lions of the Canadian Football League (CFL). He played college football at San Diego State.

== Early life ==
Tavai grew up in Manhattan Beach, California and graduated from Mira Costa High School, as did his older brothers J. R. Tavai, Jahlani Tavai, and Justus Tavai. He committed to San Diego State to play football on February 6, 2019.

== College career ==
In his collegiate career he totaled 148 tackles, 37 going for a loss of yardage, 25 sacks, a pass deflection, and one forced fumble. His best collegiate year occurred during the 2022 season where he put up, 59 tackles, 14 going for loss, and 10.5 sacks. For his performance he was named to the first team, All-Mountain West.

== Professional career ==
Pre-draft measurables
Height	Weight	Arm length	Hand span	Wingspan	40-yard dash	10-yard split	20-yard split	20-yard shuttle	Three-cone drill	Vertical jump	Broad jump	Bench press
5 ft 10 1/8 in (1.78 m)	283 lb (128 kg)	29 1/2 in (0.75 m)	9 in (0.23 m)	6 ft 0 7/8 in (1.85 m)	5.06 s	1.75 s	2.92 s	4.70 s	7.65 s	26.5 in (0.67 m)	8 ft 9 in (2.67 m)	29 reps
All values from Pro Day

=== Seattle Seahawks ===
After not being selected in the 2023 NFL draft, Tavai was signed by the Seattle Seahawks as an undrafted free agent. He was waived with a non-football injury designation on July 26, 2023.

=== BC Lions ===
On January 19, 2024, Tavai signed with the BC Lions. On June 2, Tavai was reassigned to the practice squad. Tavai started the 2025 CFL season on the Lions' active roster, however on June 26, 2025, he was placed on their one-game injured list. He rejoined the active roster on July 19. On August 6, Tavai was again placed on the Lions' one-game injured list. He rejoined the active roster on August 15. On October 24, Tavai was, for the third time that season, placed on the Lions' one-game injured list, where he remained to end the 2025 CFL regular season. He rejoined the active roster on October 31, in advance of the Western Semifinal game of the 2025 playoffs.

On January 1, 2026, Tavai re-signed with the Lions, on a one-year contract extension. On August 7, 2026, Tavai was placed on the Lions' 6-game injured list. On August 29, 2026, Tavai was shifted to the Lions' 1-game injured list. He rejoined the active roster on September 3, 2026. On October 16, 2026, Tavai was again placed on the Lions' 1-game injured list. He rejoined the active roster on October 30, 2026, ahead of the Western Semi-Final.
