= 2023 Barcelona Dragons season =

American football team in Spain

2023 Barcelona Dragons (ELF) season
- General manager: Bart Iaccarino
- Head coach: Gabriel "Black" Sánchez
- Home stadium: Estadi Olímpic de Terrassa

Uniform

The 2023 season is the third season of the Barcelona Dragons franchise in the European League of Football. After winning the Southern Conference championship in 2022, they now play in the new Western Conference.

== Preseason ==
Dragons' Offseason has been strongly marked by the departure of head coach Andrew Weidinger to Rhein Fire as well as the departures of key contributors Kyle Sweet (WR) and Zach Edwards (QB) to Paris Musketeers, and Alejandro Fernandez (DE) to Rhein Fire. As a result, the franchise decided to promote defensive coordinator of the 2022 season, Gabriel "Black" Sánchez, to the head coach position.

Another important event this Offseason has been the announcement of a new venue for the 2023 season. After two years playing in Reus (Tarragona), the franchise decides to move closer to Barcelona Metropolitan area in an attempt to secure the financial viability of the franchise. On the 10th of March, the franchise announces the "Estadi Olimpic de Terrassa" as their new venue for the 2023 season.

== Regular season ==
=== Standings ===
Central Conference
Pos	Team	GP	W	L	CONF	PF	PA	DIFF	STK	Qualification
1	(Germany) Stuttgart Surge	12	10	2	8–2	387	237	+150	W3	Automatic playoffs (#3)
2	(Austria) Raiders Tirol	12	8	4	8–2	307	230	+77	W1	
3	(Germany) Munich Ravens	12	7	5	7–3	425	338	+87	W2	
4	(Switzerland) Helvetic Guards	12	3	9	3–7	174	378	–204	L4	
5	(Italy) Milano Seamen	12	2	10	2–8	328	497	–169	L3	
6	(Spain) Barcelona Dragons	12	2	10	2–8	199	396	–197	L10	

Source: europeanleague.football

=== Schedule ===
Week	Date	Time (CET)	Opponent (Note: Intra-Conference games are in bold text)	Result	Record	Venue	Attendance (Note: Highest home attendance in bold text)	TV (Note: All games can also be watched live on ELF Gamepass) (Note: Viewers in brackets if available)	Recap
1	Sat, June 3	19:00	Helvetic Guards	W 29 – 17	1 – 0	Estadi Olímpic de Terrassa	1,428		1
2	Sat, June 10	19:00	@ Milano Seamen	W 41 – 33	2 – 0	Velodromo Vigorelli	1,700	More Than Sports TV	2
3	Sat, June 17	18:00	@ Raiders Tirol	L 13 – 29	2 – 1	Tivoli Stadion Tirol	4,285		3
4	Sat, June 24	19:00	Munich Ravens	L 15 – 39	2 – 2	Estadi Olímpic de Terrassa	1,128	Ran.de	4
5	bye								
6	Sun, July 9	13:00	@ Helvetic Guards	L 19 – 22	2 – 3	Lidl Arena	1,750		5
7	Sat, July 15	19:00	Raiders Tirol	L 3 – 17	2 – 4	Estadi Olímpic de Terrassa	1,158	Ran.de	6
8	Sun, July 23	13:00	@ Stuttgart Surge	L 14 – 33	2 – 5	Gazi-Stadion auf der Waldau	4,174	7 Maxx	7
9	Sat, July 29	19:00	Paris Musketeers	L 6 – 37	2 – 6	Estadi Olímpic de Terrassa	1,543		8
10	bye								
11	Sat, August 12	19:00	Milano Seamen	L 28 – 33	2 – 7	Estadi Olímpic de Terrassa	711	More Than Sports TV	9
12	Sat, August 19	19:00	Stuttgart Surge	L 22 – 31	2 – 8	Estadi Olímpic de Terrassa	516		10
13	Sat, August 26	17:00	@ Paris Musketeers	L 9 – 50	2 – 9	Stade Jean-Bouin	3,800		11
14	Sun, September 3	13:00	@ Munich Ravens	L 0 – 55	2 – 10	Sportpark Unterhaching	5,204		12

Source: europeanleague.football

== Attendance ==
As of September 03, 2023

Pos	Team	Total	High	Low	Average	Change
15	Barcelona Dragons	6,484	1,543	516	1,081	+5.5%
	League total	367,912	32,500	250	3,914	+22.3%

== Roster ==
Barcelona Dragons (ELF) roster
Quarterbacks: 18 Conor Miller (United States); 12 Narcis Bach (Spain); PS Marc Novella (Spain); OUT Carlton Aiken (United States); Running backs: 21 Antonio Montón (Spain); 13 Edu Molina (Spain); 34 Walter Jublawy (Spain); 85 Marc Mesa (Spain); OUT Cosimo Casati (Italy); OUT Samuel Arias (Spain); Wide receivers: 2 Vincent McDonald (United States); 14 Theodore Landström (Sweden); 80 Jordi Torrededia (Spain); 16 Alex Pacheco (Spain); 87 Jacobo Senise (Spain); 88 Alejandro Gracia (Spain); 86 Alejandro García (Spain); 81 Pau Tomás (Spain); PS Pablo Gomez (Spain); PS Lluis Sague (Spain); OUT Josh Johnston (United States); OUT Melvin Palin (France); OUT Eduardo Pérez (Spain); Tight ends: 16 Raul Cernuda (Spain); OUT Elias Rodriguez (Spain)	Offensive linemen: 72 José Ariza (Spain); 77 Max Charnley-Collins (United Kingdom); 70 Jonas Hagerup (Norway); 64 Elvys Núñez (Spain); 62 Alvaro Muñoz (Spain); 71 David Culebras (Spain); 74 Alan Mark Sousa (Spain); 65 Carlos Guillén (Spain); 56 Enzo Biasizzo (Spain); OUT Ben Dixon (United Kingdom); OUT Tomas Middleton (Panama); OUT Mikel Gomez (Spain); OUT Santiago Yuste (Spain); OUT Diego Varela (Spain); OUT Ivan Rodriguez Hita (Spain); Defensive linemen: 73 Sebastián Bowen (Spain); 98 Daniel Franco (Spain); 45 Diego Irles (Spain); 92 Mamadou Ka (Spain); 59 Rodrigo Sanz (Spain); 42 Darius Slade (United States); 50 Leonardo Rovesti (Spain); 55 Benjamin Egbudiwe (Sweden); 95 Arthur Pinheiro (Portugal) HG; 52 Santiago Requena (Spain); PS Eric Figueroa (Spain); OUT Diego Paz (Spain); OUT Daniel López (Spain)	Linebackers: 10 Cesare Brugnani (Spain); 1 Alex Posito (Spain); 43 Albarracín Victor (Spain); 49 Sebastián Castañer (Spain); 25 Manuel Fernández (Spain); 52 Mario Ruiz (Spain); PS Gerard Palau (Spain); OUT Mario Perez (Spain); Defensive backs: 22 Lautaro Frecha S (Argentina); 8 Luke Glenna S (United States); 5 Jorge Félix Velasco S (Spain); 3 Brayan Colomé S (Spain); 23 Jordi Brugnani CB (Spain); 20 Lucas Masero CB (Spain); 27 Andy Vera CB (Spain); 9 Iker González CB (Spain); 4 Julio Aguado (Spain); PS Marius Filip CB (Romania) HG; OUT Hugo Mínguez S (Spain); OUT Ivan Garcia CB (Spain); Special teams: 6 Luis Cereceda K (Spain); 7 Sam Higgins P (Australia) HG; PS Angel Miralles K (Spain); PS Victor Moreno K (Spain); OUT Pep Tricas LS (Spain)	Rookies in italics Roster updated February 26, 2024; 4 A-import, 5 E-import, 42 homegrown 51 active, 8 practice squad

== Staff ==
Barcelona Dragons (ELF) staff
Front office: Owner – Big Ten Football SL (Jason Robinson, Malcolm Smith, Martin Roache, Bartolomeo Iccarino); CEO/GM – Bartolomeo Iaccarino; Head coach: Head coach – Gabriel "Black" Sánchez 🇲🇽; Offensive coaches: Offensive coordinator/quarterbacks – Miguel Ángel Romero Jiménez 🇲🇽; Running backs – Stefano Scarpitti 🇮🇹; Wide receivers/tight ends – Victor Martín 🇪🇸; Offensive line – Eduardo Yagues Nuño 🇲🇽	Defensive coaches: Defensive coordinator – Gabriel "Black" Sánchez 🇲🇽; Defensive backs – Genaro Alfonsin 🇲🇽; Defensive backs Assistant – Samuel Eisenstadt 🇺🇸; Linebacker – Alexander Durazo 🇺🇸; Defensive line – Chase Baker 🇺🇸; Defensive line Assistant – Marc Aurellano 🇪🇸; Special teams coaches: Special teams coordinator – Alexander Durazo 🇺🇸; Assistant coaches: Head scouting and game analysis - Eric Kiewski 🇩🇪/🇫🇷; Head data and analytics – Guillermo Mora 🇪🇸; International PR - Michael Sam 🇺🇸; Strength and conditioning: Head strength and conditioning – Genaro Alfonsin 🇲🇽; updated 24th May 2023

== Awards ==
=== ELF All Stars Awards ===
Player	Position	Award
Luke Glenna (United States)	S	All Stars 1st Team

=== ELF Honors 2023. Nominees ===
Player	Position	Award
Luke Glenna (United States)	S	Defensive Player of the year

=== MVP of the Week ===
Week	Player	Position	Team	Stat
2	Conor Miller (United States)	QB	Barcelona Dragons	29/42, 69,05%, 394 yds, 4 TD, 0 Int, QBR 130,50

=== ELF Stats Leaders. Regular Season ===
Player	Position	Stat	Value
Luke Glenna (United States)	S	Total tackles	137
Luke Glenna (United States)	S	Solo tackles	79

=== ELF TOP100 List ===
Player	Position	Rank
Luke Glenna (United States)	S	#60
Theodor Landstrom (Sweden)	WR	#68
Lautaro Frecha (Argentina)	S	#97

== Statistics ==
=== Team Leaders. Regular Season ===
==== Offensive ====
Player	Position	Stat	Value	ELF Rk
Conor Miller (United States)	QB	Passes Completed	220	#5
Conor Miller (United States)	QB	Passing yards	2482	#5
Conor Miller (United States)	QB	Passing TD	18	#7
Conor Miller (United States)	QB	QB rating	80.11	#14
Toni Monton (Spain)	RB	Rushing Att	98	#12
Toni Monton (Spain)	RB	Rushing yards	339	#19
Toni Monton (Spain)	RB	Rushing TDs	3	#17
Theodor Landstrom (Sweden)	WR	Receptions	56	#14
Theodor Landstrom (Sweden)	WR	Targets	121	#3
Theodor Landstrom (Sweden)	WR	Receiving yards	805	#12
Theodor Landstrom (Sweden)	WR	Receiving TDs	8	#9

==== Defensive ====
Player	Position	Stat	Value	ELF Rk
Luke Glenna (United States)	S	Tackles Total	137	#1
Luke Glenna (United States)	S	Tackles Solo	79	#1
Luke Glenna (United States)	S	Tackles Ast	58	#4
Mamadou Ka (Spain)	DE	Sacks	3.5	#27
Mamadou Ka (Spain)	DE	Sack Yards	28	#27
Darius Slade (United States)	DE	TFL	8.5	#29
Darius Slade (United States)	DE	TFL Yards	37	#31
Luke Glenna (United States)	S	Forced fumbles	2	#7
Darius Slade (United States)	DE	Fumbles Recovered	2	#4
Luke Glenna (United States)	S	Interceptions	4	#5
Lautaro Frecha (Argentina)	S	Break Ups	10	#6

==== Returns ====
Player	Position	Stat	Value	ELF Rk
Andy Vera (Spain)	CB	Punt return Yards	88	#16
Toni Monton (Spain)	RB	Punt return Longest	27	#15
Andy Vera (Spain)	CB	Kickoff Return Yards	333	#16
Andy Vera (Spain)	CB	Kickoff Return Longest	42	#18
Andy Vera (Spain)	CB	Return yards Total	421	#15

==== Kicking ====
Player	Position	Stat	Value	ELF Rk
Luis Cereceda (Spain)	K	FG Made	4	#13
Victor Moreno (Spain)	K	FG %	66.67	#12
Victor Moreno (Spain)	K	FG Long	45	#11
Luis Cereceda (Spain)	K	PAT Made	8	#14
Luis Cereceda (Spain)	K	PAT %	72.73	#9
Victor Moreno (Spain)	K	Kickoff Yards	943	#17
Samuel Higgins (Australia)	P	Punt yards	2311	#4
Samuel Higgins (Australia)	P	Punt Long	57	#12
Samuel Higgins (Australia)	P	Punt Inside 20	14	#3
Samuel Higgins (Australia)	P	Punt 50+	6	#4
Samuel Higgins (Australia)	P	Punt Avg Yards	39.84	#7

== Offseason News ==
8 December 2023. Open Try Out is held in Badalona. Around 70 players show up.

19 November 2023. David Shelton is announced as the new head coach for the 2024 season. David has already experience in the ELF as he was DC at Leipzig Kings last season.

9 November 2023. Luke Glenna ranks #6 in the TOP50 by the webs elfcheckdown.ig and ELF NETWORK

27 October 2023. Jason Robinson, Dragons co-owner, meets with Dragons fans and replies multiple questions for over an hour.

24 October 2023. Barcelona Dragons announces the termination of the contract agreement with coach Gabriel "Black" Sanchez. Coach Black had signed a 3 years deal that new ownership terminates after 1st season.

23 October 2023. Barcelona Dragons announces a live press conference open to all fans and media for next 27 October.

15 October 2023. Trappers Cecina from Italy 2nd Division announce the signing of Bart Iaccarino as their new head coach for the 2024 season.

28 September 2023. Luke Glenna makes the 2023 ELF First Team awards by the web elfcheckdown.ig

16 September 2023. Bart Iaccarino announces in social media that he is not longer part of the Dragons organization. It is believed that he still retains a small percentage of the franchise shares though.

== In-Season movements. Players Signed ==
2 August 2023 Alan Mark Sousa OL 🇪🇸 Camioneros Coslada (LNFA)

2 August 2023 Max Charnley-Collins OL 🇬🇧 Dresden Monarchs (GFL)

27 July 2023 Vincent McDonald WR 🇺🇸 Kuopio Steelers (MAPLE LEAGUE)

20 July 2023 Carlton Aiken Jr QB 🇺🇸 Silesia Rebels (PFL) ***

20 July 2023 Cosimo Casati RB 🇮🇹 Firenze Guelfi (IFL) ***

20 July 2023 Mario Perez LB 🇪🇸 Straubing Spiders (GFL) ***

6 July 2023 Alex Pacheco WR 🇪🇸 Terrassa Reds (LNFA)

6 July 2023 Walter Jublawy RB 🇪🇸 L'Hospitalet Pioners (LNFA)

6 July 2023 Santiago Requena DL 🇪🇸 Terrassa Reds (LNFA)

6 July 2023 Alvaro Muñoz OL 🇪🇸 Barcelona Uroloki (LNFA)

6 July 2023 Jacobo Senise WR 🇪🇸 L'Hospitalet Pioners (LNFA)

6 July 2023 Lluis Segue WR/TE 🇪🇸 Castell-Platja d'Aro Ducs (LNFA)

6 July 2023 Angel Miralles K 🇪🇸 Barcelona Pagesos (LNFA)

6 July 2023 Victor Moreno K 🇪🇸 Clarke University (NAIA)

6 July 2023 Gerard Palau LB 🇪🇸 Lliça de Vall Panthers (LNFA)

6 July 2023 Eric Figueroa DL 🇪🇸 Badalona Dracs (LNFA)

6 July 2023 Marc Novella QB 🇪🇸 Barbera Rookies (LNFA)

6 July 2023 Pablo Gomez WR 🇪🇸 L'Hospitalet Pioners (LNFA)

3 July 2023 Andy Vera CB 🇪🇸 United Westland Crusaders (MAPLE)

28 June 2023 Arthur Pinheiro DT 🇵🇹 Wroclaw Panthers

22 June 2023 Tomas Middleton OL 🇵🇦 Berlin Rebels (GFL) ***

15 June 2023 Marius Filip CB 🇷🇴 Riudoms Rebels (LNFA)

== In-Season movements. Players Released ==
14 August 2023 Ben Dixon OL 🇬🇧

10 August 2023 Carlton Aiken Jr QB 🇺🇸

2 August 2023 Cosimo Casati RB 🇮🇹

27 July 2023 Mario Perez LB 🇪🇸

27 July 2023 Daniel Lopez DT 🇪🇸

27 July 2023 Diego Paz DE 🇪🇸

27 July 2023 Santiago Yuste OL 🇪🇸

27 July 2023 Josh Johnston WR 🇺🇸

20 July 2023 Tomas Middleton OL 🇵🇦

13 July 2023 Elias Rodriguez TE 🇪🇸

13 July 2023 Mikel Gómez OL 🇪🇸

13 July 2023 Samuel Arias RB 🇪🇸

30 June 2023 Hugo Mínguez S 🇪🇸

30 June 2023 Eduardo Pérez WR 🇪🇸

22 June 2023 Melvin Palin WR 🇫🇷

22 June 2023 Diego Varela OL 🇪🇸

15 June 2023 Ivan Garcia CB 🇪🇸

8 June 2023 Pep Tricas LS 🇪🇸

Unknown Ivan Rodriguez Hita OL 🇪🇸

== Pre-Season Signings ==
26 May 2023. DL Benjamin Egbudiwe signs for the 2023 season. The 1,93 meter, 31-year-old from Uppsala attended City College of San Francisco and Benedictine College (NAIA). He later went on to play for the Uppsala 86ers, the Stockholm Mean Machines and the Swedish national team. He also played for the Seinäjoki Crocodiles and the Helsinki Wolverines in Finland.

26 May 2023. Barcelona Dragons announces that part ways with LB Hugo Dyrendhal.

23 May 2023. OL Jonas Hagerup signs for the 2023 season. The Norwegian import has already ELF experience after playing for Leipzig Kings in 2021 and Wroclaw Panthers in 2022.

20 May 2023. WR Josh Johnston signs for the 2023 season. The USA import comes from Colorado School of Mines Athletics (NCAA D-2) and has recently been part of Denver Broncos mini-camp (NFL).

19 May 2023. Barcelona Dragons announces that part ways with WR Austin Duke.

25 April 2023. Barcelona Dragons has released the final roster for the upcoming 2023 season. It is expected that some additions will be announced later on and before season kick off. This list is made up of 57 players.

30 March 2023. Barcelona Dragons has released a list of 67 homegrown players who will attend a Training Camp between 20 and 22 April. From this list, 21 players have already secured a slot in the final roster. The remaining 46 players will fight to earn one of the 20–25 spots still available for homegrown players.

22 March 2023. Eric Kiewski is announced as Dragons Head of scouting and game analysis for the 2023 season. The German native has held similar positions at Berlin Rebels and Villeneuve d’Ascq Vikings in the past.

17 March 2023. S Lautaro Frecha re-signs for the 2023 season.

13 March 2023. OL Diego Varela signs for the 2023 season. The 24 years old Spaniard joins Dragons from Las Rozas Black Demons where he won the Spanish Cup in 2022.

11 March 2023. DT Daniel Franco re-signs for the 2023 season.

7 March 2023. DE Rodrigo Sanz signs for the 2023 season. Rodrigo Sanz comes from Osos Rivas where he won the LNFA Serie A championship in 2022.

4 March 2023. Guillermo Mora is announced as Dragons Head of data and analytics for the 2023 season. This will be Guillermo's 2nd season with the team.

3 March 2023. DT Daniel Lopez signs for the 2023 season. The 24 years old Spaniard joins Dragons from Las Rozas Black Demons where he won the Spanish Cup in 2022. In the early stages of his career, he won 2 Junior Spanish Championships and was called up to play with Team Spain U-19.

28 February 2023. Marc Aurellano re-signs as Defensive Line Assistant coach and Defense Scout for the 2023 season. He is also part of the L'Hospitalet Pioners Dragons Academy program as a defensive coordinator.

27 February 2023. K/P Luis Cereceda re-signs for the 2023 season.

25 February 2023. RB Eduard Molina signs for the 2023 season. Eduard Molina comes from Badalona Dracs where he won the LNFA Serie A championship in 2021. He moved to Denmark for a short stint in 2021 where he reached the final of the Danish 1st Division with the Sollerod Gold Diggers.

24 February 2023. Eduardo Yagues Nuño is announced as Dragons OL Coach for the 2023 season. The 60 years old Mexican native brings 28 years of OL coaching experience with City College of San Francisco (JUCO) where he has won 9 national championships.

20 February 2023. TE Raul Cernuda signs for the 2023 season. The 26 years old Mallorca native started playing in his hometown team Mallorca Voltors and was part of the team that promoted to Spanish 1st Division in 2014. His performances didn't go unnoticed and signs for Spanish powerhouse Badalona Dracs where he wins 5 Spanish leagues, 5 Spanish Cups and league MVP honors in 2017.

17 February 2023. OL David Culebras signs for the 2023 season. Previously played for Las Rozas Black Demons of the LNFA Serie A where he won the Spanish Cup in 2022. Before that, he won the Junior Spanish Bowl and Cup in 2021 with Black Demons young teams. He has been also selected for the senior Spanish national team.

15 February 2023. Alexander Durazo is announced as Dragons Special Teams & LB Coordinator for the 2023 season. He has held multiple coaching positions in countries like Norway, Switzerland and Spain.

11 February 2023. Samuel Eisenstadt is announced as Dragons DB Assistant coach for the 2023 season. Former DB player at Fair Haven HS and Elon University where he got CAA Academic All-Conference honors. As a coach in Europe, he started his career in Sweden taking the head coach position at Örebro Black Knights and winning Swedish Championship and HC of the year honors. Then, he moves to Spain to become head coach of Las Rozas Black Demons where he wins the Spanish Cup in December 2022.

8 February 2023. OL Mikel Gómez re-signs for the 2023 season.

5 February 2023. Chase Baker is announced as Dragons DL coach for the 2023 season. This will be Chase's 2nd season with the team.

1 February 2023. FS Jorge Félix Velasco re-signs for the 2023 season.

24 January 2023. WR Melvin Palin signs for the 2023 season. 26 years old Palin previously played for the Düsseldorf Panther in the GFL after graduating from the Bishop's Gaiters in Canada last year. Before that, he was active for the Vulkins of Victoriaville in Canada and the Kelted Quimper in France. He was selected for the French national team.

23 January 2023. Stefano Scarpitti is announced as Dragons RB coach for the 2023 season. Stefano comes from the Torino Giaguari where he has performed different coaching duties over the past years.

17 January 2023. LB Victor Albarracin re-signs for the 2023 season.

13 January 2023. DL Sebastian Bowen re-signs for the 2023 season.

10 January 2023. OL Jose Ariza re-signs for the 2023 season.

6 January 2023. WR Austin Duke signs for the 2023 season. All-time leading receiver in receptions, receiving yards and receiving TD at University of North Carolina. As undrafted free agent, he spent the NFL 2017 season on the practice squad of the Carolina Panthers and was released at the end of 2018 preseason. After joining different teams in AAF and CFL, he finally joined the New York Guardians of the XFL in 2020 where he became one of the best players, especially as a punt returner.

3 January 2023. LB Cesare Brugnani re-signs for the 2023 season.

30 December 2022. DB Luke Glenna signs for the 2023 season. The American comes from the University of St Thomas Minnesota (NCAA D-1). He earned All American team and All Conference first team honors in 2022.

28 December 2022. LB Manuel Fernandez signs for the 2023 season. The Spaniard played Spanish top division with Fuengirola Potros from 2019 to 2022. In 2021, he moved to Finland to play with Pori Bears in 2nd division where he reached Semifinals. In 2022, he joins the Ravensburg Razorbacks of the GFL.

25 December 2022. QB Conor Miller signs for the 2023 season. The American comes from the Leipzig Kings where he joined mid-season and played 3 games before going down with a season ending injury. Previously, he won the French ELITE League with the Flash La Courneuve in 2022 and led the AFL in passing yards with the Graz Giants in 2021.

22 December 2022. OL Ben Dixon signs for the 2023 season. The British comes from the Hamburg Huskies of the GFL2. Previously, he played for Carnegie American Football during 4 years where he won the BUCS Championship in 2019. In 2021, Ben joined the Sheffield Giants and was awarded the Offensive Line MVP of the season.

19 December 2022. CB Jordi Brugnani re-signs for the 2023 season.

14 December 2022. Victor Martin is announced as Dragons WR coach for the 2023 season. This will be Victor's 3rd season with the team.

12 December 2022. WR Theodor Landstrom signs for the 2023 season. The Swedish comes from the Telfs Patriots of the AFL.

9 December 2022. OL Elvys Nuñez re-signs for the 2023 season.

5 December 2022. DE Darius Slade signs for the 2023 season. Former NCAA D-1 player after stints at Ohio State, Arizona State and South Florida between 2014 and 2019.

1 December 2022. CB Lucas Masero re-signs for the 2023 season.

27 November 2022. LB Alex "Posito" González re-signs for the 2023 season.

23 November 2022. LB Hugo Dyrendhal signs for the 2023 season. DPOY of the AFL in 2022 playing for Telfs Patriots and CFL Stockholm Combine participant in 2020.

18 November 2022. WR Jordi Torrededia re-signs for the 2023 season.

14 November 2022. Miguel "Micky" Romero is announced as Dragons OC & QB coach for the 2023 season. Romero has extense coaching experience in Mexico. Twice ONEFA Major League champion and 1 time FAM YOX National champion.

12 November 2022. LB Sebastian Castañer re-signs for the 2023 season.

8 November 2022. RB Toni Monton re-signs for the 2023 season.

2 November 2022. Genaro Alfonsin is announced as Dragons DB Coach & Strength Conditioning for the 2023 season. Alfonsin has coaching experience in the Mexican LFA. As a player, he played in his native country, Mexico, and in the CFL with the Edmonton Elks.

14 September 2022. Gabriel "Black" Sanchez is announced as Dragons Head Coach for the 2023 season. Coach "Black" was Dragons Defensive coordinator and Defensive Backs coach during 2022 season.

== Season & Pre-Season News ==
25 June 2023. Tryouts take place in Tarrassa with 55 athletes.

12 June 2023. Barcelona Dragons announces a sponsor agreement with 28 Black.

26 May 2023. Barcelona Dragons announces a sponsor agreement with GoPrimal.

23 May 2023. Barcelona Dragons announces an agreement with Elite Sports Equity. This group of investors acquire 60% of the franchise shares.

1 May 2023. Pre-Season Training Camp starts in Salou (Barcelona)

20 April 2023. Training Camp for Homegrown players start in Salou (Barcelona)

19 April 2023. Barcelona Dragons announces the launch of "Open Mike" weekly podcast presented by former Dragons player Michael Sam.

12 April 2023. Game tickets are now available for the 2023 season.

7 April 2023. "Project Shadow" is now open for registration. This program is aimed at young coaches willing to learn from Dragons coaching staff by joining team practices as observers.

31 March 2023. Season holder tickets are now available for the 2023 season.

28 March 2023. Ventas Hibridas is announced as new partner of Barcelona Dragons.

26 March 2023. "The combine tour 2023" takes its fourth stop at Granada.

10 March 2023. Barcelona Dragons announce an agreement with Terrassa city council and local soccer club, Terrassa FC, to make the "Estadi Olimpic de Terrassa" the new venue where Dragons will play in the 2023 season. The agreement is for one year. "Estadi Olimpic de Terrassa" has a capacity for 11.500 seats.

12 February 2023. "The combine tour 2023" takes its third stop at Salou (Barcelona).

4 February 2023. "The Mini Monster" camp organized by Chicago Bears together with Dragons Academy Pioners takes place.

28 January 2023. "The combine tour 2023" takes its second stop at Coslada (Madrid).

19 January 2023. Barcelona Dragons Academy announces that "The Mini Monster" camp aimed at kids between 8 and 15 years of age will take place in Hospitalet next February. This is jointly organized with Chicago Bears of the NFL.

14 January 2023. "The combine tour 2023" takes its first stop at Cascais (Portugal).

2 December 2022. Bodegas Yzaguirre is announced as sponsor for "the combine tour 2023"

30 November 2022. Barcelona Dragons launch the campaign "become a member". This campaign is aimed at fans willing to further support the team by paying a small annual fee.

6 November 2022. 3 Dragons players make the top 10 in the ELF top 50 players list released by elf.network and elfcheckdown.ig. Zach Edwards (#1), Kyle Sweet (#3) and Alejandro Fernandez (#9). Michael Sam (#23) and Anthony Rodrigues (#46) make the list too.

25 October 2022. Barcelona Dragons announce the renewal of the agreement with "Carnet Jove" for 2023 season.

18 October 2022. Zach Edwards, Kyle Sweet and Alejandro Fernandez make the 2022 ELF AllStars awards by the prestigious web AmericanFootballInternational.com

17 October 2022. 25 players of Barcelona Dragons are selected to represent Spain against Ireland in the European Championship.

12 October 2022. Barcelona Dragons announce Marc Aurellano as defensive coordinator of the "Dragons Academy".

4 October 2022. Barcelona Dragons announce "The Combine Tour 2023". Tryouts for the 2023 season will take place in 4 different cities.

27 September 2022. Zach Edwards, Kyle Sweet and Alejandro Fernandez make the 2022 ELF First Team awards by the web elfcheckdown.ig

10 September 2022. Barcelona Dragons signs agreement with historical Spanish team "L'Hospitalet Pioners" to jointly create the "Dragons Academy Pioners" to compete in Youth Spanish Divisions.

9 September 2022. Barcelona Dragons announce Chase Baker as the first head coach of the "Dragons Academy". Chase Baker has been the Defensive Line coach of the Barcelona Dragons during 2022 season.

6 September 2022. Barcelona Dragons announce that shares to become a shareholder of the franchise can be purchased in the team's website. A maximum of 2000 shares at a price of 200 euros each are made available.

1 September 2022. Barcelona Dragons launch the "Dragons Academy" aimed at players between the ages of 14 and 18. This is an attempt to build a youth team program directly linked to the franchise.
