= 2023 Stuttgart Surge season =

American football club in Germany season

- General manager: Suni Musa
- Head coach: Jordan Neuman
- Home stadium: Gazi-Stadion auf der Waldau

Results
- Record: 10 – 2
- Conference place: 1st
- Playoffs: won Wildcard (vs. Panthers Wrocław 37 – 14) won Semi Finals (@ Vienna Vikings 40 – 33) lost Championship Game (@ Rhein Fire 34 – 53)

Uniform

The 2023 Stuttgart Surge season is the third season of Stuttgart Surge in the European League of Football. It is the first season with a new head coach after a winless season prior.

== Preseason ==
To the end of the regular season in 2022, the team and coaching staff of the franchise were in turmoil after finishing the first two seasons with 2 – 20. The front office in contrast were kept stabile with two additions to it of former coaches of the organization. Following changes in staff and personnel concerned transactions from the German League Champion Schwäbisch Hall Unicorns to the franchise. Almost the complete staff around Jordan Neumann changed the league, following the demise of the German Football League and its problematic structures. Connected to that, a lot of players were following in hopes of better competition and exposure.

== Regular season ==
=== Standings ===
Central Conference
Pos	Team	GP	W	L	CONF	PF	PA	DIFF	STK	Qualification
1	(Germany) Stuttgart Surge	12	10	2	8–2	387	237	+150	W3	Automatic playoffs (#3)
2	(Austria) Raiders Tirol	12	8	4	8–2	307	230	+77	W1	
3	(Germany) Munich Ravens	12	7	5	7–3	425	338	+87	W2	
4	(Switzerland) Helvetic Guards	12	3	9	3–7	174	378	–204	L4	
5	(Italy) Milano Seamen	12	2	10	2–8	328	497	–169	L3	
6	(Spain) Barcelona Dragons	12	2	10	2–8	199	396	–197	L10	

Source: europeanleague.football

== Roster ==
Stuttgart Surge roster
Quarterbacks: 4 (United States) Reilly Hennessey; 12 (Germany) Janis Kaiser; 16 (Germany) Jan Weinreich; Running backs: 20 (Germany) Janis Hackenberg; 2 (Germany) Kai Hunter; 6 (Germany) Levin Liebenow; 37 (Germany) Maximilan Merwarth FB; 35 (France) Philead Pasqualini; 17 (Germany) Nelson Stegmaier; 41 (Germany) Bryan Yankson; Wide receivers: 81 (Germany) Paul Böhringer; 79 (Switzerland) Luca Faschian; 7 (Germany) Louis Geyer; 13 (Germany) Joshua Haas; 10 (Germany) Florian Lengauer; 14 (Austria) Yannick Mayr; 3 (Germany) Aurieus Minton; 19 (United States) Bryce Nunnelly; 85 (Germany) Emil Rabin; 18 (Germany) Paul Steigerwald; 8 (United States) Darrel Stewart; Tight ends: 80 (Germany) Philip Eichhorn; 88 (Germany) Emmanuel Häfele	Offensive linemen: 78 (Germany) Benhur Arya; 62 (Germany) Elias Becher; 66 (Germany) Sascha Beck; 67 (Germany) Markos Dubravkic; 74 (Germany) Robert Hager; 73 (Germany) Paul Jakob; 61 (Germany) Luca Jokiel; 73 (Germany) Lukas Maier; 79 (Germany) Lenny Sadzik; 77 (Germany) Marlon Werthmann; 55 (Italy) Alessandro Vergani; Defensive linemen: 92 (Germany) Simon Butsch; 59 (Germany) Lorenzo Deiana; 70 (Germany) Maximilian Dommermuth; 94 (France) Ali Hayak; 54 (Germany) Alexander Kress; 75 (Ghana) Brice Tchouadje DT; 99 (Germany) Sercan Vardar DE; 91 (Germany) Raphael Zistler	Linebackers: 44 (Germany) Maleka Japhet Mbala ILB; 47 (Germany) Nikolas Knoblauch ILB; 32 (Germany) Luis Bach; 23 (Italy) Guiseppe Della Vecchia; 25 (Germany) Thomas Frach; 11 (Germany) Majan Jelvani; 1 (Germany) Sasan Jelvani; 27 (United States) Khaylan Kearse-Thomas; 28 (Germany) Luca Siebert; 43 (Germany) Benjamin Spiess; 52 (Germany) Lukas Storz; Defensive backs: 29 (Mexico) Diego Cardenas CB; 30 (Germany) Kai Singer S; 21 (Germany) Julian Jakob CB; 31 (Germany) Nick Wenzelburger S; 33 (Germany) Ben Wenzler CB; 9 (Germany) Lasse Engel; 24 (United States) Mitch Fettig; 15 (Germany) Konstantin Katz; 22 (Germany) Martin Körber; 36 (Germany) Mark Scherenberg S; 26 (Germany) Thiago Siebert; 5 (Serbia) Goran Zec; Special teams: 34 (Germany) Lenny Krieg	Rookies in italics Roster updated 5 March 2023; 4 A-import, 6 E-import, 52 homegrown 62 active

=== Transactions ===
From Frankfurt Galaxy: Konstantin Katz, Kai Hunter
From Cologne Centurions: Louis Geyer
From Leipzig Kings: Philip Eichhorn

== Staff ==
Stuttgart Surge staff
Front office: Owner – Steffen Korinth, Erwin & Martin Schmidt, Jakob Johnson; General Manager – Suni Musa; Director of Player Personnel and Development – George Streeter; Director of football operations/personnel – Jeremy Bryson; Head coach: Head coach – Jordan Neuman; Offensive coaches: Offensive coordinator – Jordan Neuman; Quarterbacks – n/a; Running backs – Joshua Tapscott; Wide receivers – Joseph Joyner; Tight ends/fullbacks – Jochen Holzinger; Offensive line – Hunter Sims	Defensive coaches: Defensive coordinator – Johannes Brenner; Assistant defensive coordinator – Cody Pastorino; Linebacker – Daniel McCray; Inside linebacker – David Zeller; Defensive line – Justin Bernthaler; Defensive backs – n/a; Special teams coaches: Special teams coordinator – n/a; Assistant coaches: Analytics coach – Friedemann Hees; Strength and conditioning: Strength and conditioning – Natalia Wisniewska; Head of Strength and conditioning – Corey Chapman; Staff updated 23 March 2023
