= 2023 Milano Seamen season =

American football team in Italy

- General manager: Marco Mutti 🇮🇹
- Head coach: Stefan Prokorny 🇦🇹
- Home stadium: Velodromo Vigorelli

The 2023 Milano Seamen season is the first season of the Milano Seamen in the European League of Football for the 2023 season, after playing in the Italian Football League the year prior.

== Preseason ==
After the announcement of the participation in the 2023 ELF season, the head coach of the previous season in the Italy national league was hired, again. Also, the stadium of the last season, the Velodromo Vigorelli, was confirmed.

The first signing was quarterback Luke Zahradka, native born in the United States, but also being a dual-passport citizen in Italy. He is also starting quarterback of the Italy national team, winning the silver medal in Flag football at the 2022 World Games. Further notable signings were Jéan Constant and Marquise Manning, latter playing for the Washburn Ichabods football team in the NCAA Division II.

== Regular season ==
=== Standings ===
Central Conference
| Pos | Team | GP | W | L | CONF | PF | PA | DIFF | STK | Qualification |
|---|---|---|---|---|---|---|---|---|---|---|
| 1 | (Germany) Stuttgart Surge | 12 | 10 | 2 | 8–2 | 387 | 237 | +150 | W3 | Automatic playoffs (#3) |
| 2 | (Austria) Raiders Tirol | 12 | 8 | 4 | 8–2 | 307 | 230 | +77 | W1 | |
| 3 | (Germany) Munich Ravens | 12 | 7 | 5 | 7–3 | 425 | 338 | +87 | W2 | |
| 4 | (Switzerland) Helvetic Guards | 12 | 3 | 9 | 3–7 | 174 | 378 | –204 | L4 | |
| 5 | (Italy) Milano Seamen | 12 | 2 | 10 | 2–8 | 328 | 497 | –169 | L3 | |
| 6 | (Spain) Barcelona Dragons | 12 | 2 | 10 | 2–8 | 199 | 396 | –197 | L10 | |

Source: europeanleague.football

== Roster ==
Milano Seamen roster
| Quarterbacks: 12 Nicholas Dalmasso (Italy); 7 Luke Zahradka (United States) (Italy); Running backs: 20 Luca Assemian Balotelli (Italy); 2 Ali Khalife (Germany); 32 Cristiano Mancini (Italy); 4 Modeste Pooda (Italy); Wide receivers: 13 Lorenzo Bassi (Italy); 81 Juan Flores Calderón (Spain); 89 Marion Cebotaru (Moldova); 5 Jéan Constant (United States); 10 Andrea Fiammenghi (Italy); -- Flippo Fiammenghi (Italy); 11 Ismail Lamamra (Italy); 15 Andrea Serra (Italy); 17 Tamsir Seck (Italy); Tight ends: 88 Leonardo Franchi (Italy); 87 Daniel Marshall (United Kingdom); 19 Gianluca Santagostino (Italy) | Offensive linemen: 78 Domenico Carroli (Italy); 55 Lorenzo Cesana (Italy); 62 Marco Colombo (Italy); 71 Thomas Fileccia (France); 66 Francesco Runco (Germany); 70 Edoardo Sandonati (Italy); 57 Harry Sayer (United Kingdom); 63 Lewis Thomas (United Kingdom); 53 Francesco Virlinzi (Italy); Defensive linemen: 93 Samuele Cavallini (Italy); 91 Giaocomo Insom (Italy); 75 Xhelian Molla (Italy); 99 Claudio Nicola (Italy); 90 Simone Perego (Italy); 92 Francesco Rivelli (Italy); 97 Marco Taddia (Italy); 69 Igor Timotijevic (Italy) | Linebackers: 44 Tiberio Calbucci (Italy); 9 Nicolò Fonti (Italy); 31 Ivan Fonti (Italy); 45 Edoardo Gallo (Italy); -- Antonio Gianera (France); 6 Kevin Khay (Italy); 33 Diego Rinaldi (Italy); 47 Andrea Zini (Italy); Defensive backs: 1 Saad Ali (Pakistan); 14 Tommaso Calegari (Italy); 8 Dejvion Edwards-Steward (United States); 21 Lorenzo Gioco (Italy); 29 Federicco Maffi (Italy); 22 Marquise Manning (United States); 28 Lorenzo Paglicci (Italy); 36 Flavio Piccinni LB (Italy); 23 Christian Sottura (Italy); 26 Bismark Yeboah (Italy); Special teams: 3 Matteo Felli (Italy); 40 Giorgio Tavecchio (Italy) | Rookies in italics Roster updated November 22, 2023; 4 A-import, 8 E-import, 43 homegrown 55 active |

== Staff ==
Milano Seamen staff
| Front office: Owner – Milano Seamen S.r.l.; General Manager – Marco Mutti; President – Paolo Mutti; Head coach: Head coach – Stefan Pokorny; Offensive coaches: Offensive coordinator – Dan Dodd; Quarterbacks – n/a; Running backs – n/a; Assistant running backs – Marco Polizzi; Wide receivers – Ruben Fioriti; Tight ends/fullbacks – n/a; Offensive line – Mauro "Pepè" Salvemini | Defensive coaches: Defensive coordinator – Stefan Pokorny; Linebacker – Riccardo Matani; Defensive line – Luca Bellora; Defensive backs – Paolo Guerini; Special teams coaches: Special teams coordinator – Stefano Busnaghi; Strength and conditioning: Corporate partner – Ultra Strength S&C; updated 28 January 2022 |
