= 2023 Raiders Tirol season =

American football team in Austria

- General manager: Ulz Däuber
- Head coach: (United States) / (Germany) Kevin Herron
- Home stadium: Tivoli Stadion Tirol

Uniform

The 2023 Raiders Tirol season is the second season of the Raiders Tirol team in the third season of the European League of Football. The semifinalist of last season was will compete again in the Central Conference, the first time without its longterm rival Vienna Vikings.

== Preseason ==
After the departure of franchise legend Sean Shelton, retiring and becoming sporting director of the Munich Ravens, the organization was looking for a new franchise quarterback and found the Canadian Christion Strong of the German club Cologne Crocodiles.

== Regular season ==
=== Standings ===
Central Conference
Pos	Team	GP	W	L	CONF	PF	PA	DIFF	STK	Qualification
1	(Germany) Stuttgart Surge	12	10	2	8–2	387	237	+150	W3	Automatic playoffs (#3)
2	(Austria) Raiders Tirol	12	8	4	8–2	307	230	+77	W1	
3	(Germany) Munich Ravens	12	7	5	7–3	425	338	+87	W2	
4	(Switzerland) Helvetic Guards	12	3	9	3–7	174	378	–204	L4	
5	(Italy) Milano Seamen	12	2	10	2–8	328	497	–169	L3	
6	(Spain) Barcelona Dragons	12	2	10	2–8	199	396	–197	L10	

Source: europeanleague.football

== Roster ==
Raiders Tirol roster
Quarterbacks: 15 Stefan Maiacher (Austria); 17 Christian Strong (Canada); Running backs: 25 Tobias Bonatti (Austria); 24 Lukas Haslwanter (Austria); 7 Sandro Platzgummer (Austria); Wide receivers: 80 Fabian Abfalter (Austria); 10 Philipp Haun (Austria); 5 Jarvis McClam (United States); 6 Adrian Platzgummer (Austria); 11 Toni Rabensteiner (Italy); 4 Marco Schneider (Austria); Tight ends: 85 Markus Schaberl (Austria); 87 Richard Weber (Austria)	Offensive linemen: 53 Jeffery Asare (Austria); 78 Daniel Fankhauser RG (Austria); 76 Tobias Haslehner (Austria); 71 Toby Lettman (United Kingdom); 59 Gerd Mitterdorfer C (Italy); 74 Steven Nielsen (Denmark); 72 Basil Weber (Switzerland); 79 Robert Wittmann (Austria); Defensive linemen: 91 Stanley Aronokhale (Austria); 90 Niklas Gustav (Germany); 93 Tinashe Jefferson Chawaguta DT (Austria); 97 Nicolas Melcher DE (Austria); 99 Jeol Maddock (Australia); 92 Laurynas Orlovicius DT (Lithuania); 96 Denis William Butz DT (Germany)	Linebackers: 39 Sebastian Huber (Austria); 13 Lucky Ogbevoen OLB (Austria); 43 Precious Ogbevoen (Austria); 55 Julian Perfler ILB (Austria); 20 Patrick Pilger (Austria); 1 Ruben Seeber (Austria); 48 Philipp Timmermann OLB (Germany); 33 Tim Unger (Germany); Defensive backs: 21 Divine Buckrham (United States); 9 Thomas Kugler S (Germany); 18 Gregory Laday (United States); 3 Jan Mayerhofer S (Austria); 14 Jessey Mensah (Austria); 23 Vincent Müller CB (Austria); 8 Christoph Nitzlnader CB (Austria); 28 Fabian Raunig (Austria); 32 Matthias Rebl (Austria); 35 Clemens Voit (Austria); Special teams: 18 Niklas Sanin K (Austria)	Rookies in italics Roster updated 17 June 2023; 4 A-import, 6 E-import, 36 homegrown 46 active

=== Transactions ===
From Frankfurt Galaxy: Ja'Len Embry
From Vienna Vikings: Sebastian Huber

== Staff ==
Raiders Tirol staff
Front office: President – Elisabeth Swarovski; General Manager – Ulz Däuber; Team Manager – Paul-Philipp Lasch; Head coach: Head coach – Kevin Herron; Offensive coaches: Offensive coordinator/wide receiver – Kyle Callahan; Quarterbacks – n/a; Running backs – Frank Roser; Tight ends – n/a; Offensive line – Dominik Bauer	Defensive coaches: Defensive coordinator/defensive backs – Malik Jackson; Linebacker – Simon Riedl; Defensive line – Eugen Kremser; Special teams coaches: Special teams coordinator – n/a; Assistant coaches: Mental/breathwork choach – Frank Roser; Strength and conditioning: Head strength and conditioning – Andreas Pröller; Staff updated 23 March 2023
