= Collin Hill =

American football player (born 1997)

Profile
- Position: Quarterback

Personal information
- Born: October 9, 1997 (age 29); Dayton, Ohio, U.S.
- Listed height: 6 ft 4 in (1.93 m)
- Listed weight: 213 lb (97 kg)

Career information
- High school: Dorman (Roebuck, South Carolina)
- College: Colorado State (2016–2019); South Carolina (2020–2021)
- NFL draft: 2021: undrafted

Career history
- Cincinnati Bengals (2021)*; Helvetic Guards (2023)
- * Offseason or practice squad member only

Collin M. Hill (born October 9, 1997) is an American football quarterback. He played college football at Colorado State and South Carolina.

== Early life ==
Hill grew up in Moore, South Carolina, and attended Dorman High School where he played basketball and football. He was named team captain and MVP as a senior in 2015, leading the Cavaliers to the South Carolina state championship game.

== College career ==
=== Colorado State ===
After high school, Hill committed to Colorado State University football program. In 2016, he gained the starting job after incumbent Nick Stevens was benched. A notable game of his was where he threw for 370 yards in a loss to Wyoming. Overall, he went 2-2 as a starter in 2016, throwing for 1,096 yards, 8 touchdowns, and 2 interceptions. He did not play in the 2017 season. In 2018, in his first 5 games, he played during garbage time. He started the latter 5 games of that season, overall throwing for 1,387 yards, 7 touchdowns and 7 interceptions. In 2019, his final season with Colorado State, he only played the first 3 games of the season, winning one. He threw for 837 yards, 8 touchdowns and 2 interceptions.

=== South Carolina ===
In 2020, he transferred to the University of South Carolina and was named the starting quarterback over Ryan Hilinski.

== Professional career ==
Pre-draft measurables
Height	Weight	Arm length	Hand span	40-yard dash	10-yard split	20-yard split	20-yard shuttle	Three-cone drill	Vertical jump	Broad jump
6 ft 4.3 in (1.94 m)	213 lb (97 kg)	33 3/8 in (0.85 m)	9 1/8 in (0.23 m)	4.93 s	1.72 s	2.87 s	4.40 s	7.25 s	33.5 in (0.85 m)	9 ft 3 in (2.82 m)
Source: USC Pro Day

=== Cincinnati Bengals ===
Hill went undrafted in the 2021 NFL draft and later signed as a free agent by the Cincinnati Bengals. After the preseason, he was cut and failed to make the 53-man roster.

=== Helvetic Guards ===
On December 2, 2022, Hill was announced as starting quarterback of the newly founded franchise Helvetic Guards of the European League of Football.

== Personal life ==
Hill owns a business degree from Colorado State University and is working on a Master’s in educational technology.
