= Silas Nacita =

American football player (born 1993)

Silas Nacita (born 1993), nicknamed the Swiss Army Knife, is a former American football running back. He played college football at Cornell Big Red, before leaving the program and transferring to walk on at Baylor where he earned playing time during the 2014 season rushing for 191 yards and three touchdowns and a 6.2 yards per carry average. Nacita would be ruled ineligible by the NCAA and not allowed to play at the college level. He would first sign to play professionally in the German Football League (GFL) for the Marburg Mercenaries and Frankfurt Universe. He has also played for top-level teams in the Italian Football League and for the Danube Dragons in the Austrian Football League (AFL). He finished his career playing for the Helvetic Guards of the European League of Football (ELF).
