= Jahlani Tavai =

American football player (born 1996)

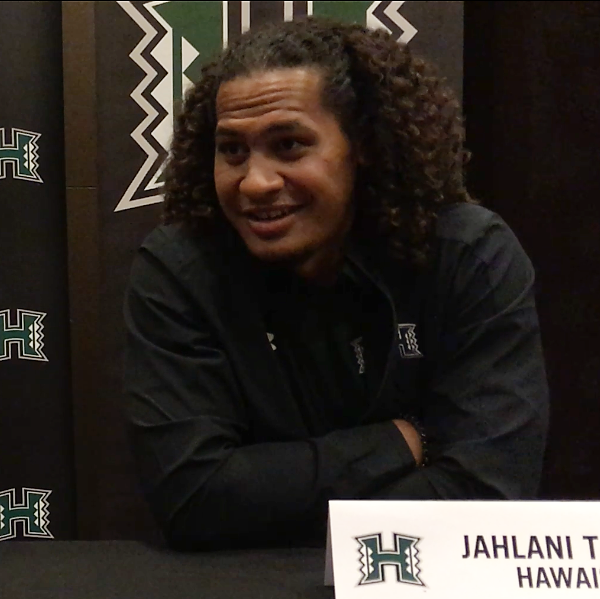
- Tavai at 2017 Mountain West media day

No. 32 – Jacksonville Jaguars
- Position: Linebacker
- Roster status: Active

Personal information
- Born: September 28, 1996 (age 30); Inglewood, California, U.S.
- Listed height: 6 ft 2 in (1.88 m)
- Listed weight: 255 lb (116 kg)

Career information
- High school: Mira Costa (Manhattan Beach, California)
- College: Hawaii (2014–2018)
- NFL draft: 2019: 2nd round, 43rd overall pick

Career history
- Detroit Lions (2019–2020); New England Patriots (2021–2025); Jacksonville Jaguars (2026–present)

Awards and highlights
- First-team All-Mountain West (2016); Second-team All-Mountain West (2017)

Career NFL statistics as of 2025
- Total tackles: 466
- Sacks: 5.5
- Forced fumbles: 6
- Fumble recoveries: 2
- Pass deflections: 14
- Interceptions: 4
- Stats at Pro Football Reference

Jahlani Karl Tavai (born September 28, 1996) is an American professional football linebacker for the Jacksonville Jaguars of the National Football League (NFL). He is the younger brother of J. R. Tavai and older brother of Justus Tavai and Jonah Tavai. He played college football for the Hawaii Rainbow Warriors.

== College career ==
=== College statistics ===
| Year | Team | Games | | Tackles | | | | | Interceptions | | | | | Fumbles | | | |
| Year | Team | GP | GS | Solo | Ast | Total | Loss | Sack | Int | Yards | Avg | TD | PD | FR | Yards | TD | FF |
|---|---|---|---|---|---|---|---|---|---|---|---|---|---|---|---|---|---|
| 2014 | Hawaii | Redshirt | | | | | | | | | | | | | | | |
| 2015 | Hawaii | 13 | 11 | 26 | 30 | 56 | 5.0 | 3.0 | 0 | 0 | 0.0 | 0 | 0 | 0 | 0 | 0 | 0 |
| 2016 | Hawaii | 14 | 14 | 85 | 43 | 128 | 20.0 | 7.0 | 1 | 0 | 0.0 | 0 | 2 | 2 | 12 | 0 | 2 |
| 2017 | Hawaii | 12 | 12 | 66 | 58 | 124 | 11.0 | 5.5 | 1 | 8 | 8.0 | 0 | 1 | 1 | 15 | 0 | 0 |
| 2018 | Hawaii | 8 | 8 | 42 | 40 | 82 | 6.0 | 2.0 | 0 | 0 | 0.0 | 0 | 2 | 0 | 0 | 0 | 1 |
| Career | | 47 | 45 | 219 | 171 | 390 | 42.0 | 17.5 | 2 | 8 | 4.0 | 0 | 5 | 3 | 27 | 0 | 3 |

== Professional career ==
Pre-draft measurables
| Height | Weight | Arm length | Hand span | Wingspan | 40-yard dash | 10-yard split | 20-yard split | 20-yard shuttle | Vertical jump | Broad jump |
|---|---|---|---|---|---|---|---|---|---|---|
| 6 ft 2 3/8 in (1.89 m) | 250 lb (113 kg) | 31 7/8 in (0.81 m) | 9 in (0.23 m) | 6 ft 6 in (1.98 m) | 4.86 s | 1.70 s | 2.79 s | 4.41 s | 33.5 in (0.85 m) | 9 ft 2 in (2.79 m) |
All values from NFL Combine/Pro Day

=== Detroit Lions ===
Tavai was selected by the Detroit Lions in the second round (43rd overall) of the 2019 NFL draft. He played in 15 games in six starts, recording 58 tackles, two sacks, a forced fumble, two passes defensed and an interception. He suffered a shoulder injury in Week 16 and was placed on injured reserve on December 23, 2019.

On August 31, 2021, Tavai was waived by the Lions as part of the final pre-season roster cuts.

=== New England Patriots ===
After being released by Detroit, on September 1, 2021, the New England Patriots signed Tavai to their practice squad, eventually activating him, while reuniting with Matt Patricia, his former head coach in Detroit. He was promoted to the active roster on October 13.

Tavai began the 2022 season as a backup linebacker. He was named a starter in Week 5 and remained there the rest of the season. On November 29, 2022, Tavai signed a two-year, $4.4 million contract extension with the Patriots. He finished the season with 69 tackles, 1.5 sacks, and two passes defensed.

On July 2, 2024, Tavai signed a three-year contract extension with the Patriots worth $15 million. He played in 17 games (16 starts) for New England, recording one interception, five pass deflections, one sack, and 115 combined tackles.

Tavai began the 2025 season on injured reserve after suffering an undisclosed injury. On October 4, 2025, Tavai was activated ahead of New England's Week 5 matchup against the Buffalo Bills. He started for New England in Super Bowl LX, a 29–13 loss to the Seattle Seahawks.

On March 11, 2026, Tavai was released by the Patriots.

=== Jacksonville Jaguars ===
On August 7, 2026, Tavai signed with the Jacksonville Jaguars.

== Personal life ==
In December 2025, Tavai's partner Kalei Mau was in a six-day coma due to a severe infection, which ultimately resulted in the death of their unborn daughter.

== NFL career statistics ==
Legend
| **Bold** | Career high |

=== Regular season ===
| Year | Team | Games | | Tackles | | | | | | Interceptions | | | | | | Fumbles | |
| Year | Team | GP | GS | Cmb | Solo | Ast | Sck | TFL | Sfty | PD | Int | Yds | Avg | Lng | TD | FF | FR |
|---|---|---|---|---|---|---|---|---|---|---|---|---|---|---|---|---|---|
| 2019 | DET | 15 | 6 | 58 | 37 | 21 | **2.0** | 5 | 0 | 2 | 1 | **2** | **2.0** | **2** | 0 | 1 | 0 |
| 2020 | DET | 16 | 10 | 58 | 32 | 26 | 0.0 | 2 | 0 | 0 | 0 | 0 | – | – | – | **2** | **1** |
| 2021 | NE | 13 | 0 | 14 | 6 | 8 | 0.0 | 0 | 0 | 0 | 0 | 0 | – | – | – | 0 | **1** |
| 2022 | NE | **17** | 12 | 69 | 37 | 32 | 1.5 | 2 | 0 | 2 | 0 | 0 | – | – | – | 0 | 0 |
| 2023 | NE | **17** | **16** | 110 | **65** | 45 | 1.0 | 5 | 0 | **5** | **2** | **2** | 1.0 | **2** | 0 | **2** | 0 |
| 2024 | NE | **17** | **16** | **115** | 58 | **57** | 1.0 | **7** | 0 | **5** | 1 | 0 | 0.0 | 0 | 0 | 0 | 0 |
| 2025 | NE | 12 | 7 | 42 | 21 | 21 | 0.0 | 4 | 0 | 0 | 0 | 0 | – | – | – | 1 | 0 |
| Career | | 107 | 67 | 466 | 256 | 210 | 5.5 | 25 | 0 | 14 | 4 | 4 | 1.0 | 2 | 0 | 6 | 2 |

=== Postseason ===
| Year | Team | Games | | Tackles | | | | | | Interceptions | | | | | | Fumbles | |
| Year | Team | GP | GS | Cmb | Solo | Ast | Sck | TFL | Sfty | PD | Int | Yds | Avg | Lng | TD | FF | FR |
|---|---|---|---|---|---|---|---|---|---|---|---|---|---|---|---|---|---|
| 2021 | NE | 1 | 0 | 0 | 0 | 0 | 0.0 | 0 | 0 | 0 | 0 | – | – | – | – | 0 | 0 |
| 2025 | NE | 4 | 2 | **8** | **2** | **6** | 0.0 | 0 | 0 | 0 | 0 | – | – | – | – | 0 | 0 |
| Career | | 5 | 2 | 8 | 2 | 6 | 0.0 | 0 | 0 | 0 | 0 | – | – | – | – | 0 | 0 |
