= Norm Chow =

American football player and coach (born 1946)

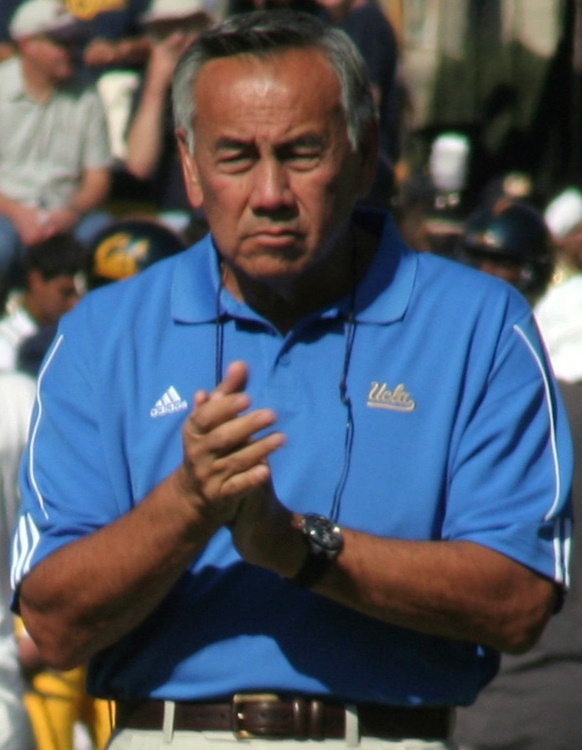
- Chow with the UCLA Bruins in 2008

Personal information
- Born: May 3, 1946 (age 80); Honolulu, Hawaii, U.S.

Career information
- College: Utah
- NFL draft: 1968: undrafted

Career history
- Waialua HS (HI) (1970–1972) Head coach; BYU (1973–1974) Graduate assistant; BYU (1975) Freshmen; BYU (1976–1977) Wide receivers; BYU (1978) Running backs; BYU (1979–1981) Running backs coach & wide receivers coach; BYU (1982–1985) Wide receivers coach & recruiting coordinator; BYU (1986–1995) Quarterbacks coach & wide receivers coach; BYU (1996–1999) Assistant head coach, offensive coordinator, quarterbacks coach, & wide receivers coach; NC State (2000) Offensive coordinator & quarterbacks coach; USC (2001–2004) Offensive coordinator; Tennessee Titans (2005–2007) Offensive coordinator; UCLA (2008–2010) Offensive coordinator; Utah (2011) Offensive coordinator; Hawaii (2012–2015) Head coach; Mira Costa HS (CA) (2016) Assistant; Los Angeles Wildcats (2020) Offensive coordinator; Helvetic Guards (2023) Head coach; Vienna Vikings (2025) Offensive analyst

Awards and highlights
- Broyles Award (2002)

Head coaching record
- Regular season: 3–9 (.250) (ELF); 10–36 (.217) (college); 5–25 (.167) (high school)
- Postseason: 0–0 (–)
- Career: 13–45 (.224)
- Coaching profile at Pro Football Reference

Norm Chow
- Simplified Chinese: 周 友 贤
- Traditional Chinese: 周 友 賢
Transcriptions
Standard Mandarin
- Hanyu Pinyin: Zhōu Yǒuxián
Yue: Cantonese
- Jyutping: Zau1 Jau5 Jin4
Southern Min
- Hokkien POJ: Chiu Iú Hiân

Norman Yew Heen Chow (born May 3, 1946) is an American football coach and former player. He was the head football coach at the University of Hawaii at Manoa, a position he held from December 2011 until November 2015 and previously held the offensive coordinator position for the Utah Utes, UCLA Bruins, the NFL's Tennessee Titans, USC Trojans, NC State Wolfpack, and BYU Cougars.

Chow won the 2002 Broyles Award as the nation's top collegiate assistant coach. He also was named the 2002 NCAA Division I-A Offensive Coordinator of the Year by American Football Monthly and was named the National Assistant Coach of the Year in 1999 by the American Football Foundation. He is well known for developing quarterbacks. During his time as an assistant football coach, Chow has helped coach 8 of the top 14 career passing-efficiency leaders and 13 quarterbacks who rank among the top 30 in NCAA history for single-season passing yardage. The list of players he coached includes Jim McMahon, Steve Young, and Philip Rivers, as well as Heisman Trophy winners Ty Detmer, Carson Palmer, and Matt Leinart.

== Early life ==
Norm Chow was born and raised in Honolulu. His paternal grandfather was an immigrant from China, his mother is Native Hawaiian, and he is of Chinese, Hawaiian, and Portuguese descent. Chow graduated from Punahou School.

== Education and playing career ==
Chow played college football at the University of Utah, and was a two-year starter and a three-year letterman offensive guard for the Utes. In his senior season, Chow was named to the All-WAC first team and gained All-America honorable mention honors. He then played briefly in the Canadian Football League, for the Saskatchewan Roughriders, before an injury ended his professional athletic career. He was selected to Utah's All-Century Team.

He graduated from the University of Utah in 1968 with his bachelor's degree in physical education. He received his master's degree in special education from Utah in 1970 and his doctorate in educational psychology, Ed.D., from Brigham Young University in 1978.

== Coaching career ==
=== High school ===
Chow began his coaching career in Hawaii, where he was born, at Waialua High and Intermediate School. He was the head coach there from 1970 to 1972 and posted a 5–25 record in three seasons.

=== BYU ===
In 1973, Chow left for BYU to be a graduate assistant under LaVell Edwards, who was installing an innovative pass-oriented offense. He was promoted to receivers coach in 1976, a post he would hold until 1982 (apart from a one-year stint as running backs coach). In 1979, BYU led the country in passing offense, total offense, and scoring offense during the regular season, and quarterback Jim McMahon finished fifth in the Heisman vote.

In 1982, head coach LaVell Edwards named Chow as principal offensive play-caller. Chow continued to call all the offensive plays for the rest of his 17 years at BYU.

In 1983, the offense, led by quarterback Steve Young, set NCAA single-season records for pass completion percentage (71.3%) and total yards per game (584.2). Young finished second in the Heisman vote.

In 1984, the unbeaten BYU team won the consensus national championship. Quarterback Robbie Bosco finished second in the nation in total passing and third in the Heisman vote.

Chow became quarterbacks and receivers coach in 1986. In 1990, the Cougars upset defending national champion and top-ranked Miami, FL., 28–21, with nearly 500 yards of offense and Ty Detmer went on to win the Heisman. In 1996, Chow was officially given the title of assistant head coach / offensive coordinator / quarterback / receivers coach. That season, the Cougars with Steve Sarkisian as quarterback, won the WAC and earned its first ever New Year's Day Bowl. BYU came from behind to beat Kansas State in the Cotton Bowl, and finished with No. 5 ranking and a 14–1 record, setting an NCAA record for most wins in a season by Division I football team. Sarkisian finished the season with a quarterback rating of 173.6, highest in the country.

During his 27 years with BYU, the Cougars had a record of 244–91–3. When LaVell Edwards retired, Chow was passed over as successor and left BYU for NC State.

=== NC State ===
In 2000, Chow became the offensive coordinator and quarterback coach at NC State under new head coach Chuck Amato. Under Chow's tutelage, quarterback Philip Rivers broke seven school passing records and was named ACC Freshman of the Year. NC State finished second in offense in the ACC to Florida State and won its first bowl game in five years.

=== USC ===
In 2001, Chow accepted Pete Carroll's offer to serve as the offensive coordinator at USC, and became one of the highest-paid assistant coaches in the country. In 2002, quarterback Carson Palmer won the Heisman trophy, the first Trojan to do so since Marcus Allen in 1981. The following year, USC finished 12–1 and won the Associated Press National Championship, the school's first national title since 1978. In 2004, quarterback Matt Leinart won the school's sixth Heisman trophy and USC trounced Oklahoma 55–19 in the BCS National Championship.

He left USC in spring 2005, after unsuccessfully interviewing for the Stanford head coaching vacancy, for a job offer to be the offensive coordinator of the Tennessee Titans—his first job on the professional level. Their head coach, Jeff Fisher, was a graduate of USC.

=== Tennessee Titans ===
Chow was the Titans' offensive coordinator from 2005 to 2007. During this time, the Titans had non-losing seasons in 2006 (8–8) and 2007 (10–6), and appeared in the 2007 AFC Playoffs. In 2007, the Titans were 21st overall in total offense, with a total of nine touchdown passes.

=== UCLA ===
On January 15, 2008, after being fired by the Titans following the 2007 season, Chow was hired by new UCLA Bruins head coach Rick Neuheisel as offensive coordinator. When Lane Kiffin took over as head coach of the USC Trojans in early 2010, he attempted to hire Chow away from UCLA, but Chow elected to stay after being assured he would receive a contract extension. However, the Bruins' 2010 season proved to be an offensive disappointment: UCLA finished ranked 116th out of 120 teams nationally in passing yardage and 118th in passing efficiency, as they tried to install a pistol offense; in his three seasons, the team had a 15–22 record. On January 22, 2011, Chow departed UCLA after negotiating a buyout to the contract extension that would have paid him $1 million over the next two seasons rather than remain at UCLA and be demoted to a lesser coaching position. While Chow made his reputation by developing quarterbacks, Ramona Shelburne of ESPNLosAngeles.com said he never really had one to develop at UCLA due to injuries to their quarterbacks.

=== Utah ===
Chow was immediately hired as the offensive coordinator of the Utah Utes, a team that was getting ready to enter its first season in the Pac-12. "Rick [Neuheisel] did a nice job with [facilitating his exit at UCLA]. And [Utah] is a good football situation," said Chow. "I went to school there, you know? I have two degrees from there. I met my wife there, my kids were born in Salt Lake. Not many people can say they get to go full circle like that."

=== Hawaii ===
On December 21, 2011, Chow was named head coach of the University of Hawaii.

Chow began his first season as head coach of Hawaii in 2012 and posted a 3–9 record. In his second year, Hawaii finished 1–11, losing five games by a touchdown or less including two in overtime. In response to speculation about his job security, Hawaii's administration expressed confidence in Chow.

Through his first two seasons, Chow was one of only two Hawaii coaches (along with Fred von Appen) to have begun his tenure with consecutive losing seasons since the school attained Division 1 status.

On November 1, 2015, Chow was fired as head coach of the University of Hawaii after suffering a 58–7 loss at home against Air Force. Taking his spot as interim head coach was offensive lineman coach Chris Naeole. Chow's overall coaching record at Hawaii was 10–36 in four years of coaching.

=== High school ===
Chow moved to Manhattan Beach, California after leaving Hawaii and joined the coaching staff of his former wide receiver at USC, Mike Williams, as an assistant coach at Van Nuys High School in the spring and summer of 2016. Chow left Van Nuys to be an assistant coach at Mira Costa High School in Manhattan Beach for the 2016 regular season.

=== Los Angeles Wildcats ===
On June 12, 2019, new XFL franchise Los Angeles Wildcats announced Chow had been hired as their offensive coordinator.

=== Helvetic Guards ===
From August 2022 to April 2024, Chow was the first and only head coach of the Helvetic Guards in the European League of Football. In his sole season as head coach, the Guards finished with a 3-9 record and failed to make the playoffs.

=== Vienna Vikings ===
In April 2025, Chow was hired as an offensive analyst for the Vienna Vikings.

== Head coaching interest ==
In addition to Stanford, Chow has officially interviewed for the head coaching jobs of the NFL's Arizona Cardinals and the NCAA's North Carolina State University, the University of Kentucky, and the University of Hawaii.

In 2002, Chow turned down an offer to be the head coach of the University of Kentucky, and opted to stay at USC.

Chow was a candidate to replace Karl Dorrell at UCLA, but withdrew his candidacy soon after interviewing. Chow was also considered to replace June Jones at the University of Hawaii in 2008 but was not hired for the position at that time.

== Personal life ==
Chow and his wife, Diane, have four children: Carter, Maile, Cameron, and Chandler. Carter serves as his father's agent. Chow has nine grandchildren.

== Head coaching record ==
=== ELF ===
Team	Year	Regular season					Postseason			
Team	Year	Won	Lost	Ties	Win %	Finish	Won	Lost	Win %	Result
HG	2023	3	9	0	.250	4th in Central Conference	—	—	—	—
Total		3	9	0	.250	—	—	—	—	—

=== College ===
Year	Team	Overall	Conference	Standing	Bowl/playoffs
Hawaii Rainbow Warriors (Mountain West Conference) (2012–2015)
2012	Hawaii	3–9	1–7	9th	
2013	Hawaii	1–11	0–8	6th (West)	
2014	Hawaii	4–9	3–5	4th (West)	
2015	Hawaii	2–7 (Note: Chow was fired after the team's 58–7 loss to Air Force; offensive line coach Chris Naeole was named interim head coach for remainder of the season.)	0–6	6th (West)	
Hawaii:		10–36	4–26		
Total:		10–36			
* Fired after the ninth game of the season.

== Awards and honors ==
- 2004 National Championship (USC) [VACATED]
- 2003 National Championship (USC)
- 2002 Broyles Award (Nation's top assistant coach)
- 2002 NCAA Division I-A Offensive Coordinator of the Year by American Football Monthly
- 1999 National Assistant Coach of the Year by the American Football Foundation
- 1996 NCAA Division I-A Offensive Coordinator of the Year by American Football Monthly
- 1993 National Assistant Coach of the Year by Athlon in 1993
- 1984 National Championship (BYU)
- Utah's All-Century Team as an offensive lineman

== Notable players coached ==
- Reggie Bush, USC, first-round NFL draft pick
- Matt Cassel, USC
- Ty Detmer, BYU, Heisman Trophy winner
- Matt Leinart, USC, Heisman Trophy winner, first-round NFL draft pick
- Jim McMahon, BYU, first-round NFL draft pick
- Carson Palmer, USC, Heisman Trophy winner, no.1 overall NFL draft pick
- Philip Rivers, N.C. State, first-round NFL draft pick
- Marc Wilson, BYU, first-round NFL draft pick
- Steve Young, BYU, first-round NFL draft pick
