= J. R. Tavai =

American football player (born 1993)

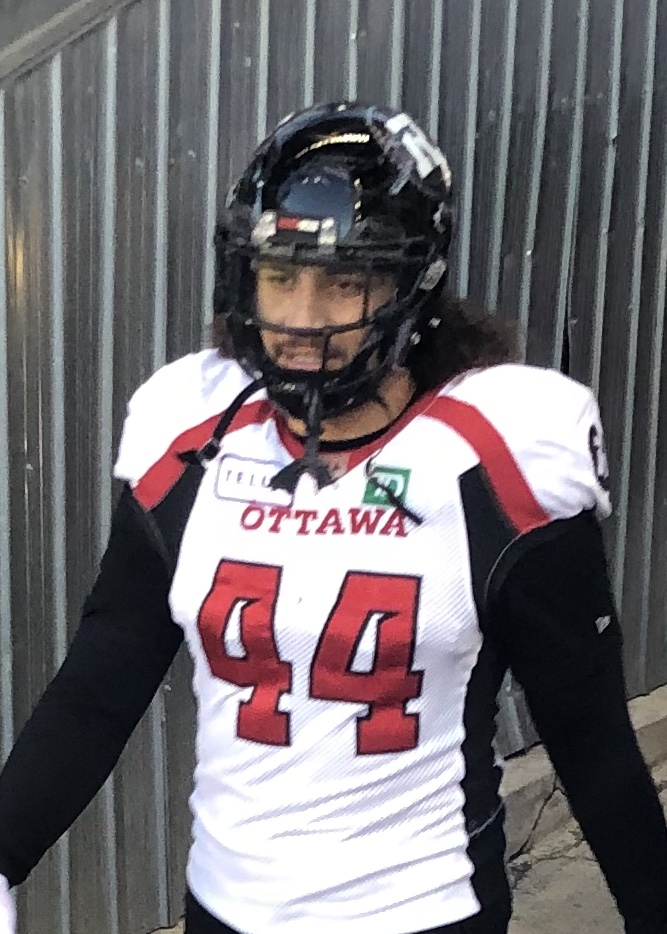
- Tavai with the Ottawa Redblacks in 2019

No. 41, 44, 10
- Positions: Linebacker, defensive end

Personal information
- Born: September 23, 1993 (age 33); Inglewood, California, U.S.
- Listed height: 6 ft 2 in (1.88 m)
- Listed weight: 250 lb (113 kg)

Career information
- High school: Mira Costa (Manhattan Beach, California)
- College: USC (2011–2014)
- NFL draft: 2015: undrafted

Career history
- Tennessee Titans (2015–2016); Ottawa Redblacks (2018–2019); BC Lions (2020–2021); Hamilton Tiger-Cats (2022)*; Helvetic Guards (2023)
- * Offseason or practice squad member only

Career NFL statistics
- Tackles: 3
- Sacks: 1.0
- Interceptions: 0
- Stats at Pro Football Reference
- Stats at CFL.ca

John Robert Tavai (born September 23, 1993) is an American former professional football player in the National Football League (NFL) and Canadian Football League (CFL). He was a linebacker in the NFL and a defensive end in the CFL. He played college football for the USC Trojans. Tavai was signed by Tennessee Titans as an undrafted free agent in 2015. He was also a member of the Ottawa Redblacks, BC Lions and Hamilton Tiger-Cats of the CFL, and the Helvetic Guards of the European League of Football.

== Professional career ==
Pre-draft measurables
Height	Weight	Arm length	Hand span	40-yard dash	10-yard split	20-yard split	20-yard shuttle	Three-cone drill	Vertical jump	Broad jump	Bench press
6 ft 1 3/4 in (1.87 m)	249 lb (113 kg)	31 1/2 in (0.80 m)	9 1/8 in (0.23 m)	4.91 s	1.71 s	2.84 s	4.63 s	7.32 s	30.5 in (0.77 m)	9 ft 4 in (2.84 m)	23 reps

=== Tennessee Titans ===
After going unselected in the 2015 NFL draft, Tavai signed with the Tennessee Titans on May 11, 2015. On September 5, he was waived by Tennessee as a part of final roster cuts. On November 11, Tavai was re-signed to the team's practice squad. On December 12, he was promoted to the active roster. In his first season with the Titans, Tavai played in four games and contributed with three defensive tackles, one sack, and a forced fumble.

On September 2, 2016, Tavai was released by the Titans as a part of final roster cuts. He was re–signed to the team's practice squad on December 6.

=== Ottawa Redblacks ===
On January 3, 2018, it was announced that Tavai had signed with the Ottawa Redblacks. He was a defensive end during his CFL career. Over two seasons, he played in 22 regular season games, recording 57 defensive tackles, eight special teams tackles, seven sacks and four forced fumbles.

=== BC Lions ===
Upon entering free agency on February 11, 2020, Tavai signed with the BC Lions to a one-year contract. Following the cancelled 2020 season he signed a one-year contract extension on January 12, 2021. In his first season with the Lions Tavai played in nine games and recorded 15 defensive tackles, three special teams tackles, two quarterback sacks and one forced fumble. Following the 2021 season he was not re-signed by the Lions and became a fee agent in February 2022.

=== Hamilton Tiger-Cats ===
On February 9, 2022 Tavai signed with the Hamilton Tiger-Cats. On May 19, the Tiger-Cats placed Tavai on the retired list.

=== Helvetic Guards ===
On December 24, 2022 Tavai signed with the Helvetic Guards of the European League of Football.

== Personal life ==
Tavai is of Samoan descent. He has four brothers who played Division I NCAA football: older brother Jordan played at Kansas, younger brother Jahlani played at Hawaii and was selected by the Detroit Lions in the 2nd round of the 2019 NFL draft, and younger brothers Justus and Jonah both played for San Diego State before becoming a professional rugby player and CFL player respectively. His uncle, John Schuster is a former rugby union player who represented New Zealand as a member of the All Blacks.
