= Justus Tavai =

American football player (born 1998)

Profile
- Position: Defensive tackle

Personal information
- Born: June 26, 1998 (age 28); Inglewood, California, U.S.
- Listed height: 6 ft 3 in (1.91 m)
- Listed weight: 295 lb (134 kg)

Career information
- High school: Mira Costa (Manhattan Beach, California)
- College: El Camino (2017); Hawaii (2018–2021); San Diego State (2022)
- NFL draft: 2023: undrafted

Career history
- New England Patriots (2023)*
- * Offseason or practice squad member only
- Stats at Pro Football Reference

Justus Tavai (born June 26, 1998) is an American football defensive tackle. He was signed by the New England Patriots as an undrafted free agent after the 2023 NFL draft. He played college football at El Camino, Hawaii, and San Diego State.

== Personal life ==
He is the younger brother of current Patriots linebacker Jahlani Tavai and defensive end J. R. Tavai.

== Professional career ==
Justus Tavai plays tighthead prop for RFC LA in Major League Rugby.

Pre-draft measurables
Height	Weight	Arm length	Hand span	40-yard dash	10-yard split	20-yard split	20-yard shuttle	Three-cone drill	Vertical jump	Broad jump	Bench press
6 ft 1 in (1.85 m)	285 lb (129 kg)	32 1/2 in (0.83 m)	9 1/2 in (0.24 m)	5.14 s	1.77 s	2.95 s	4.77 s	7.74 s	28 in (0.71 m)	8 ft 6 in (2.59 m)	25 reps
All values from Pro Day

After going undrafted in the 2023 NFL draft, Tavai signed with the New England Patriots of the National Football League (NFL) on June 5, 2023. He was waived by the Patriots as a part of final roster cuts on August 27.
