= Helvetic Guards =

European American football team

- Current season
- Logo
- Uniforms

General information
- Founded: 2022
- Folded: 2024
- Stadium: Lidl Arena Wil
- Headquartered: Switzerland
- Website: helveticguards.ch

Personnel
- General manager: Toni Zöller
- Head coach: Norm Chow

League / conference affiliations
- European League of Football (ELF)

The Helvetic Guards was an American football team based in Switzerland that played in the 2023 season of the European League of Football (ELF).

== History ==
The entry of the newly founded franchise into the professional league was announced on 13 May 2022, during a press conference to open the 2022 ELF season by the team's general manager Toni Zöller. Together with co-owner Mukadder Erdönmez and others they established the first ELF franchise in Switzerland.

On 26 August 2022, the team announced Norm Chow as the head coach for the European League of Football 2023 season.

On 30 October 2022 the front office announced that they will play their home games in the Lidl Arena in Wil, Switzerland, about 25 miles (40 km) east of Zürich.

On 2 December 2022, the team signed Collin Hill to be their starting quarterback. They added fellow US-American running back and wide receiver Silas Nacita on 17 December 2022.

On 4 April 2024, the team announced the end of operations, to be replaced by another Swiss ELF entry. On 11 April 2024, the new team name, the Helvetic Mercenaries, and the logo was announced.

== Roster ==
Helvetic Guards roster
Quarterbacks: Collin Hill (United States); Richard Wartmann (Switzerland); Running backs: Kevin Audétat (Switzerland); Dmitri Gfeller (Switzerland); Ibony Mbungu (Switzerland); Silas Nacita (United States); Moritz Stein (Switzerland); Wide receivers: Cayman Bailey Jr. (Switzerland); Xavier Baudraz (Switzerland); Gregorio Calonego (Italy); Timo Hager (Switzerland); Anton Jallai (Sweden); David Marty (Germany); Pascal Rüegg (Switzerland); Tight ends: Igor Mašlanka (Slovakia); Theo Stirnimann (Switzerland)	Offensive linemen: Federico Ferretti (Switzerland); Wilson Ferretti (Switzerland); Pascal Hollenstein (Switzerland); Filip Kovljenic (Switzerland); Amos Laoye (Belgium); Niels Meier (Switzerland); Matthias Münger (Switzerland); Gabriel Rodriguez (Spain); Timothy Schmid (Switzerland); Jürg Stalder (Switzerland); Raffael Wachter (Switzerland); Defensive linemen: Abdur-Rahman Elabed (Switzerland); Yannick Friedberg (Switzerland); Tim Hänni (Switzerland); Philipp Leimgruber (Switzerland); Dominik Liechti (Switzerland); Emmanuel Kabengele (Democratic Republic of the Congo); Michael Kimpiabi (Switzerland); Milos Panic (Switzerland); Michel Sousa (Switzerland); Luca Steiner (Switzerland); Dalibor Vuckovic (Switzerland)	Linebackers: Andreas Buri (Switzerland); Julien Conus (Switzerland); Jonathan Falk (Switzerland); Adrian Fiedler (Germany); Fabio Rothmund (Switzerland); Timothy Schürmann (Switzerland); Fabian Strahm (Switzerland); J. R. Tavai (United States); Ludovic Vincent (Switzerland); Defensive backs: Labinot Arapi (Switzerland); Macéo Beard (France); Fabian Bruhin (Switzerland); Ken Hike (United States); Olivier Marty (Germany); Dominic Mischler (Switzerland); Chaska Rémy Perron (France); Hendrik Rutishauser (Switzerland); Florian Ziegler (Switzerland); Special teams: Nils Jonkmans (Switzerland)	Rookies in italics Roster updated 14 February 2023; 4 A-import, 6 E-import, 47 homegrown 57 active

== Staff ==
Helvetic Guards staff
Front office: Owner – Mukadder Erdönmez; General Manager – Toni Zöller; Head of football operations – Zeki Öztürk; Head of administration – Ferhat Kahraman; Head coach: Head coach – Norm Chow; Offensive coaches: Offensive coordinator – n/a; Quarterbacks – n/a; Running backs – Darius Willis; Wide receivers – Mike Wilson; Tight ends – Pete Metzelaars; Offensive line – Bob Palcic; Offensive assistant – Rudy Fonkoue, Christian Warzecha	Defensive coaches: Defensive coordinator – Jim Ward; Defensive line – n/a; Linebackers – Don Clemons; Defensive backs – n/a; Defensive assistant – Khaled Bassyouny, Armin Waldherr, Chris Krattiger; Special teams coaches: Special teams coordinator – Pete Metzelaars; Special teams coach – Glenn Chase; Strength and conditioning: Athletic Director – Matt Hammer, J.C. Williams; Staff updated 14 February 2023
