= 2026 European Football Alliance season =

2026 EFA season
- League: European Football Alliance
- Sport: American football
- Duration: 15 May – 29 August 2026
- Games: 30 + 3 playoff games
- Teams: 6
- TV partner(s): Sportdigital+ (Germany, Austria, Switzerland), FuboTV (Canada, USA) Hessischer Rundfunk and Bayerischer Rundfunk (Germany), Sporty TV (Czech Republic), Molotov TV (France), Verdens Gang (Norway)
- Streaming partner: YouTube
- Season MVP: (United States) Jadrian Clark

2026 Championship Game
- Date: 29 August 2026
- Venue: Tivoli Stadion Tirol
- Champions: (Denmark) Nordic Storm

Seasons
- ELF 2025 2027

The 2026 EFA season is the inaugural season of the European Football Alliance, a professional American football league based in Europe. Six teams from five countries participate. The season started on 15 May 2026. In the Championship Game on 29 August 2026, Nordic Storm won the first EFA championship against Munich Ravens.

The games are available free of charge on the YouTube platform. Games involving German teams were streamed by Hessischer Rundfunk and Bayerischer Rundfunk via their online platforms. In German-speaking countries, selected games were also broadcast on Sportdigital+. Additional international broadcast partners included Sporty TV in the Czech Republic, Molotov TV in France, and FuboTV in the United States and Canada.

== Format and Teams ==
2026 European Football Alliance season (Europe)
Locations of teams competing in the 2026 EFA season.

Six teams competed in the inaugural season of the European Football Alliance. All of them previously played in the now-defunct European League of Football. The Madrid Bravos, initially announced as team for the 2026 season, withdrew on 10 March 2026.

The six teams faced each other twice, once at home and once away. Hence each played ten games over a 13-week regular season. The top four teams qualified for the semifinals, named BIG4. These were played on August 15 and 16, 2026, at BBBank Arena in Frankfurt. The two semifinal winners advance to the inaugural EFA Championship Game on 29 August 2026 in the Tivoli Stadion Tirol in Innsbruck.

Franchise	City	Stadium	Capacity	Head Coach	Record 2025
Frankfurt Galaxy	(Germany) Frankfurt	PSD Bank Arena	12,542	(Germany) Thomas Kösling	6–6
Munich Ravens	(Germany) Unterhaching	Uhlsport Park (4 games)	15,053	(United States) Kendral Ellison	11–1, Semi Final
Munich Ravens	(Germany) Munich	Grünwalder Stadion (1 game)	15,000	(United States) Kendral Ellison	11–1, Semi Final
Nordic Storm	(Denmark) Søborg	Gladsaxe Stadium	13,507	(United States) John Shoop	10–2, Semi Final
Paris Musketeers	(France) Saint-Ouen-sur-Seine	Stade Bauer (3 game)	6,500	(United States) Jack Del Rio	7–5
Paris Musketeers	(France) Bondoufle	Essonne Stadium (2 games)	18,850	(United States) Jack Del Rio	7–5
Prague Lions	(Czech Republic) Prague	FK Viktoria Stadion (4 games)	3,327	(United States) James Brooks	7–5
Prague Lions	(Czech Republic) Prague	Ďolíček Stadium (1 game)	6,500	(United States) James Brooks	7–5
Raiders Tirol	(Austria) Innsbruck	Tivoli Stadion Tirol	17,400	(Germany) Shuan Fatah	6–6

== Regular season ==
=== Overview ===
Home \ Away	FRA	MUN	NOR	PAR	PRA	TIR
Frankfurt Galaxy	—	26–45	9–47	20–21	31–18	41–61
Munich Ravens	38–5	—	37–34	45–22	45–13	58–30
Nordic Storm	20–12	55–7	—	48–16	47–13	39–16
Paris Musketeers	24–31	7–41	3–41	—	30–9	24–17
Prague Lions	34–37	12–48	14–40	36–35	—	29–41
Raiders Tirol	5–21	24–32	14–40	12–33	44–45	—

Updated to match(es) played on 2 August 2026. Source: EFA
Legend: Blue = home team win; Red = away team win.

=== Standings ===
Pos	Team	Pld	W	L	PF	PA	PD	Qualification
1	z – Nordic Storm	10	9	1	411	141	+270	Qualification to BIG4
2	x – Munich Ravens	10	9	1	396	228	+168	Qualification to BIG4
3	x – Frankfurt Galaxy	10	4	6	233	313	−80	Qualification to BIG4
4	x – Paris Musketeers	10	4	6	215	300	−85	Qualification to BIG4
5	e – Raiders Tirol	10	2	8	264	362	−98	
6	e – Prague Lions	10	2	8	223	398	−175	

Source: European Leagues Football Data Lab

Tiebreaker: Total Wins, Winning Percentage, Head-to-Head Record, Strength of Victory (SOV), Total Points Differential (capped at ±35 points per game), Total Points Scored, Points Differential in Head-to-Head Games, Away Wins, Coin Toss.
Legend

x — Clinched playoff berth
z — Clinched regular season winner
e — Eliminated from playoffs

=== Schedule ===
==== Week 1 ====
Date	Time	Away team	Result	Home team	Venue	Attendance	Ref
Fri, 15 May	7:30 pm	Paris Musketeers	21 – 20	Frankfurt Galaxy	PSD Bank Arena, Frankfurt	5,638	
Sat, 16 May	1:00 pm	Prague Lions	13 – 47	Nordic Storm	Gladsaxe Stadium, Søborg	1,690	
Sun, 17 May	4:00 pm	Raiders Tirol	30 – 58	Munich Ravens	Grünwalder Stadion, Munich	5,175	

==== Week 2 ====
Date	Time	Away team	Result	Home team	Venue	Attendance	Ref
Sat, 23 May	6:00 pm	Prague Lions	9 – 30	Paris Musketeers	Stade Bauer, Saint-Ouen-sur-Seine	2,592	
Sat, 23 May	6:00 pm	Raiders Tirol	16 – 39	Nordic Storm	Gladsaxe Stadium, Søborg	1,617	
Bye week	Munich Ravens, Frankfurt Galaxy						

==== Week 3 ====
Date	Time	Away team	Result	Home team	Venue	Attendance	Ref
Sat, 30 May	6:00 pm	Munich Ravens	45 – 26	Frankfurt Galaxy	PSD Bank Arena, Frankfurt	4,581	
Bye week	Raiders Tirol, Paris Musketeers, Prague Lions, Nordic Storm						

==== Week 4 ====
Date	Time	Away team	Result	Home team	Venue	Attendance	Ref
Sat, 6 June	6:00 pm	Munich Ravens	41 – 7	Paris Musketeers	Stade Bauer, Saint-Ouen-sur-Seine	2,882	
Sat, 6 June	6:00 pm	Frankfurt Galaxy	21 – 5	Raiders Tirol	Tivoli Stadion Tirol, Innsbruck	2,953	
Sun, 7 June	1:00 pm	Nordic Storm	40 – 14	Prague Lions	Ďolíček Stadium, Prague	1,141	

==== Week 5 ====
Date	Time	Away team	Result	Home team	Venue	Attendance	Ref
Sat, 13 June	6:00 pm	Raiders Tirol	17 – 24	Paris Musketeers	Stade Bauer, Saint-Ouen-sur-Seine	2,413	
Sun, 14 June	1:00 pm	Prague Lions	13 – 45	Munich Ravens	Uhlsport Park, Unterhaching	3,161	
Sun, 14 June	1:00 pm	Frankfurt Galaxy	12 – 20	Nordic Storm	Gladsaxe Stadium, Søborg	1,593	

==== Week 6 ====
Date	Time	Away team	Result	Home team	Venue	Attendance	Ref
Sun, 21 Jun	1:00 pm	Paris Musketeers	16 – 48	Nordic Storm	Gladsaxe Stadium, Søborg	2,169	
Sun, 21 Jun	4:00 pm	Prague Lions	18 – 31	Frankfurt Galaxy	PSD Bank Arena, Frankfurt	4,519	
Bye week	Raiders Tirol, Munich Ravens						

==== Week 7 ====
Date	Time	Away team	Result	Home team	Venue	Attendance	Ref
Sat, 27 Jun	6:00 pm	Prague Lions	45 – 44	Raiders Tirol	Tivoli Stadion Tirol, Innsbruck	2,326	
Sun, 28 Jun	1:00 pm	Nordic Storm	34 – 37	Munich Ravens	Uhlsport Park, Unterhaching	2,772	
Bye week	Frankfurt Galaxy, Paris Musketeers						

==== Week 8 ====
Date	Time	Away team	Result	Home team	Venue	Attendance	Ref
Sat, 4 Jul	6:00 pm	Munich Ravens	32 – 24	Raiders Tirol	Tivoli Stadion Tirol, Innsbruck	3,076	
Sun, 5 Jul	4:00 pm	Frankfurt Galaxy	31 – 24	Paris Musketeers	Essonne Stadium, Bondoufle		
Bye week	Prague Lions, Nordic Storm						

==== Week 9 ====
Date	Time	Away team	Result	Home team	Venue	Attendance	Ref
Sat, 11 Jul	4:00 pm	Paris Musketeers	35 – 36	Prague Lions	FK Viktoria Stadion, Prague		
Sat, 11 Jul	6:00 pm	Nordic Storm	40 – 14	Raiders Tirol	Tivoli Stadion Tirol, Innsbruck	2,312	
Sun, 12 Jul	1:00 pm	Frankfurt Galaxy	5 – 38	Munich Ravens	Uhlsport Park, Unterhaching	3,265	

==== Week 10 ====
Date	Time	Away team	Result	Home team	Venue	Attendance	Ref
Sat, 18 Jul	3:00 pm	Nordic Storm	41 – 3	Paris Musketeers	Essonne Stadium, Bondoufle		
Sat, 18 Jul	3:15 pm	Raiders Tirol	61 – 41	Frankfurt Galaxy	PSD Bank Arena, Frankfurt	5,322	
Sun, 19 Jul	1:00 pm	Munich Ravens	48 – 12	Prague Lions	FK Viktoria Stadion, Prague		

==== Week 11 ====
Date	Away team	Home team	Venue
25/26 Jul	All teams on bye week		

==== Week 12 ====
Date	Time	Away team	Result	Home team	Venue	Attendance	Ref
Sun, 2 Aug	1:00 pm	Nordic Storm	47 – 9	Frankfurt Galaxy	PSD Bank Arena, Frankfurt	5,925	
Sun, 2 Aug	1:00 pm	Raiders Tirol	41 – 29	Prague Lions	FK Viktoria Stadion, Prague		
Sun, 2 Aug	1:00 pm	Paris Musketeers	22 – 45	Munich Ravens	Uhlsport Park, Unterhaching	4,329	

==== Week 13 ====
Date	Time	Away team	Result	Home team	Venue	Attendance	Ref
Sat, 8 Aug	12:00 pm	Munich Ravens	7 – 55	Nordic Storm	Gladsaxe Stadium, Søborg	3,113	
Sun, 9 Aug	1:00 pm	Frankfurt Galaxy	37 – 34	Prague Lions	FK Viktoria Stadion, Prague	1,228	
Sun, 9 Aug	4:00 pm	Paris Musketeers	33 – 12	Raiders Tirol	Tivoli Stadion Tirol, Innsbruck	4,083	

== Attendance ==
Pos	Team	Total	High	Low	Average	Change
1	Frankfurt Galaxy	25,985	5,925	4,519	5,197	−28.3%
2	Munich Ravens	18,702	5,175	2,772	3,740	+8.4%
3	Raiders Tirol	14,750	4,083	2,312	2,950	−13.5%
4	Paris Musketeers	7,887	2,882	2,413	2,629	+43.3%
5	Nordic Storm	10,182	3,113	1,593	2,036	−4.6%
6	Prague Lions	2,369	1,228	1,141	1,185	+24.7%
	League total	79,875	5,925	1,141	3,195	n/a

Updated to games played on 09 August 2026
Source: EFA

== Play-offs ==
The semifinal games, named BIG4, will be played on 15 and 16 August 2026 at PSD Bank Arena in Frankfurt. The EFA Championship Game, scheduled for August 29, 2026 in Tivoli Stadion in Innsbruck.

BIG4
1	(Denmark) Nordic Storm	45
4	(France) Paris Musketeers	6
2	(Germany) Munich Ravens	52
3	(Germany) Frankfurt Galaxy	33

EFA Championship Game
1	(Denmark) Nordic Storm	48
2	(Germany) Munich Ravens	28

=== BIG4 ===
==== Frankfurt Galaxy 33, Munich Ravens 52 ====
Munich Ravens vs. Frankfurt Galaxy

Quarter	1	2	3	4	Total
Galaxy	7	14	0	12	33
Ravens	14	10	14	14	52

at BBBank Arena, Frankfurt, Germany

- Date: 15 August 2026
- Game time: 6:00 p.m CEST
- Game attendance: 4,094
Nordic Storm vs. Paris Musketeers

Quarter	1	2	3	4	Total
Musketeers	6	0	0	0	6
Storm	7	21	17	0	45

at BBBank Arena, Frankfurt, Germany

- Date: 16 August 2026
- Game time: 3:00 p.m CEST

=== EFA Championship Game ===
==== Munich Ravens 28, Nordic Storm 48 ====
Nordic Storm vs. Munich Ravens

Quarter	1	2	3	4	Total
Ravens	6	0	8	14	28
Storm	13	15	0	20	48

at Tivoli Stadion Tirol, Innsbruck, Austria

- Date: 29 August 2026
- Game time: 6:00 p.m CEST
- Game attendance: 4,157

== Awards ==
=== Player of the week ===
Bold: MVP of the week

	Defensive	Offensive	Special Team
Week 1	Mason Chambers (FRA)	**Russel Tabor (MUC)**	Bijon Harris (MUC)
Week 2	Ludvig Myrén (NOR)	**Roberto Miranda (NOR)**	Dean Faithful (PAR)
Week 3	Johannes Zirngibl (MUC)	**Brevin Easton (FRA)**	Bijon Harris (MUC)
Week 4	**Chris Mulumba** **(FRA)**	Jadrian Clark (NOR)	Lokmen Nadjem (PAR)
Week 5	**Jaylen Clay** **(FRA)**	William Patterson (PRG)	Austin Mitchell (PAR)
Week 6	Ludvig Myrén (NOR)	Brendan Beaulieu (NOR)	**Matyáš Bílý (PRG)**
Week 7	Luke Glenna (NOR)	**Jaylon Henderson (PRG)**	Marek Hruboň (PRG)
Week 8	Mamadou Sy (PAR)	**Ethan Garbers (FRA)**	Ryan Rimmler (FRA)
Week 9	**Hugo Dyrendahl (NOR)**	Jaylon Henderson (PRG)	Marek Hruboň (PRG)
Week 10	Johannes Zirngibl (MUC)	**Kenyatte Allen** **(RAI)**	Bijon Harris (MUC)
Week 12	Maceo Beard-Aigret (NOR)	**Lukas Haslwanter (RAI)**	Michael Stadler (MUC)
Week 13	**Wilifred Pene (NOR)**	Jadrian Clark (NOR)	Ryan Rimmler (FRA)

=== Season Awards ===
Award	Player	Team	Position
Most Valuable Player	(United States) Jadrian Clark	Nordic Storm	Quarterback
Offensive Player of the Year	(United States) Brendan Beaulieu	Nordic Storm	Wide Receiver
Defensive Player of the Year	(United States) Luke Glenna	Nordic Storm	Free Safety
Rookie of the Year	(Switzerland) Alex Raich	Munich Ravens	Linebacker
Offensive Rookie of the Year	(France) Hassane Dosso	Paris Musketeers	Wide Receiver
Defensive Rookie of the Year	(Austria) Jakob Scheucher	Raiders Tirol	Linebacker
Special Teams Player of the Year	(United States) Bijon Harris	Munich Ravens	Kick/Punt Returner
Offensive Lineman of the Year	(Sweden) Victor Stoffel	Nordic Storm	Offensive Tackle
Homegrown Player of the Year	(France) Hugo Tekedam	Paris Musketeers	Wide Receiver
Comeback Player of the Year	(United Kingdom) Glen Toonga	Nordic Storm	Running Back
Coach of the Year	(United States) Kendral Ellison	Munich Ravens	Head Coach
Assistant Coach of the Year	(United States) Dave Warner	Prague Lions	Offensive Coordinator
Man of Honor	(New Zealand) Etuale Lui	Munich Ravens	Defensive Lineman

== Signees to other professional leagues ==
The following players invited to the NFL's International Combine, assigned to NFL's International Player Pathway Program (IPPP), signed or drafted by CFL team or signed with UFL team following their involvement with The EFA in 2026:

=== NFL ===
Player	Position	EFA team	NFL team	Ref
Maceo Beard	S	Nordic Storm	Minnesota Vikings	
