= Jordan Genmark Heath =

Swedish gridiron football player (born 1997)

No. 2 – Nordic Storm
- Position: Running back
- Roster status: Active

Personal information
- Born: December 16, 1997 (age 28); Stockholm, Sweden
- Listed height: 6 ft 1 in (1.85 m)
- Listed weight: 225 lb (102 kg)

Career information
- High school: Cathedral Catholic (San Diego, California, U.S.)
- College: Notre Dame (2017–2020); UCLA (2021)
- NFL draft: 2022: undrafted
- CFL draft: 2022G: 1st round, 5th overall pick

Career history
- Saskatchewan Roughriders (2022); Philadelphia Stars (2023); Paris Musketeers (2024); Nordic Storm (2025–present)
- Stats at CFL.ca

Jordan Alexander Moses Genmark Heath (born December 16, 1997) is a Swedish professional gridiron football running back for the Nordic Storm of the European League of Football (ELF). He played college football for the Notre Dame Fighting Irish and UCLA Bruins. He has also played for the Saskatchewan Roughriders of the Canadian Football League (CFL) in 2022 and Philadelphia Stars of the United States Football League (USFL) in 2023.

== College career ==
Genmark Heath began his college career at Notre Dame in 2017 as a safety. In April 2018, he switched from safety to linebacker.

In September 2020, Genmark Heath left the Notre Dame football team.

In October 2020, he committed to UCLA.

=== Statistics ===
Year	Team	Games		Tackles				Interceptions				Fumbles		
Year	Team	GP	GS	Total	Solo	Ast	Sack	PD	Int	Yds	TD	FF	FR	TD
2017	Notre Dame	13	0	16	9	7	0.0	0	0	0	0	0	0	0
2018	Notre Dame	13	1	16	7	9	0.0	0	0	0	0	0	0	0
2019	Notre Dame	13	1	10	6	4	0.0	0	0	0	0	0	0	0
2020	Notre Dame	0	0	DNP										
2021	UCLA	12	12	55	23	32	3.5	2	1	20	0	0	2	0
Career		51	14	97	45	52	3.5	2	1	20	0	0	2	0

== Professional career ==
In May 2022, Genmark Heath attended rookie mini-camp with the Kansas City Chiefs as a tryout player.

Genmark Heath was drafted by the Saskatchewan Roughriders in the 2022 CFL global draft. He signed with the team on October 4, 2022, but was cut on October 31.

Genmark Heath signed with the Philadelphia Stars of the USFL on January 11, 2023. He was cut on June 8, 2023.

== Personal life ==
Genmark Heath moved from Sweden to the United States at age 14. He grew up a fan of the San Diego Chargers.
