= Dean Faithfull =

English gridiron football player (born 1987)

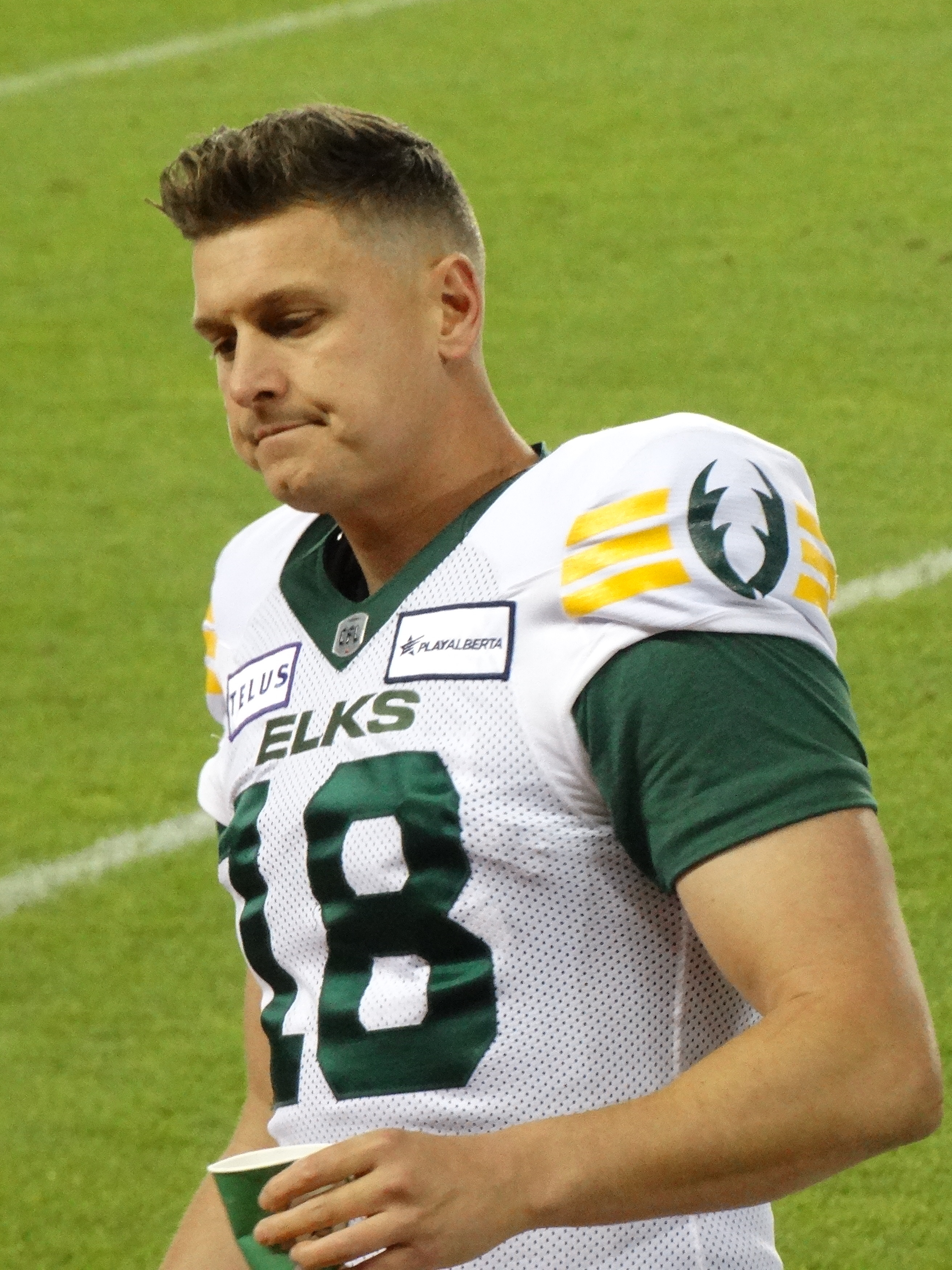
- Faithfull with the Edmonton Elks in 2023

No. 2 – Billings Outlaws
- Position: Placekicker

Personal information
- Born: 23 May 1987 (age 39); Fareham, England
- Listed height: 6 ft 2 in (1.88 m)
- Listed weight: 207 lb (94 kg)

Career information
- College: Florida Tech (2007–2010); CSU Pueblo (2021)
- CFL draft: 2023G: 1st round, 2nd overall pick

Career history
- Edmonton Elks (2023–2024); Billings Outlaws (2025); Paris Musketeers (2026 - present)
- Stats at CFL.ca

Dean Faithfull (born 23 May 1987) is an English professional gridiron football placekicker for the Paris Musketeers in the European Football Alliance. Formerly a soccer player, he played the sport in college from 2007 to 2010 at Florida Tech and later played across the world in semi-professional leagues. In 2021, he began playing football for the CSU Pueblo Thunderwolves, becoming the oldest NCAA Division II football player in history. He was selected with the second overall pick of the 2023 CFL global draft by the Edmonton Elks.

== Early life and soccer career ==
Faithfull was born on 23 May 1987, in the United Kingdom. He grew up in Hampshire and attended Tauntons College, but later moved to the U.S. to play college soccer for the Florida Tech Panthers. He played four years for the Panthers, from 2007 to 2010, as a defender. As a freshman, he started 13 games and scored one goal, after which he started 15 games in 2008 and posted nine shots. In 2009, Faithfull played in all 17 matches and started 16, tying for the team lead with four assists. He started all 18 games in 2010 and anchored the team's defense, totaling a career-high seven points and a team-high 1,626 minutes played.

After his stint with the Florida Tech Panthers, Faithfull played two years of soccer for a club in the second tier of the Australian soccer league system, followed by one year in the Liga FPD, the top division of Costa Rica. He then went on to play in Trinidad and Tobago and for a team in the Belgian Second Division.

== College football career ==
Faithfull visited his Florida Tech coach in 2019, who asked him if he wanted to play for the school's football team as they needed a new placekicker. He still was academically eligible for two semesters and tried out for the team. His tryout was successful and he was offered a scholarship, with the plan that he would join the team in the summer of 2020; however, the team was discontinued due to the COVID-19 pandemic.

Faithfull was later brought in for a tryout by the CSU Pueblo Thunderwolves, after they hired a coach who knew him. He made the team for the 2021 season and, aged 34, became the oldest NCAA Division II player of all time. His role included kicking field goals, extra points, and making the kickoffs. In his only year with the ThunderWolves, he went 7-for-12 on field goals, scored 20 extra points, and averaged 58.5 yards off 44 kickoffs, while making 24 touchbacks. Faithfull graduated from the school in December 2021 with a master's degree in business.

== Professional career ==
Faithfull was selected with the second overall pick of the 2023 CFL global draft by the Edmonton Elks. In preseason, he made 6-of-9 attempts, with the final one being blocked against the Winnipeg Blue Bombers. He made the final roster and became the team's oldest player at 36 despite being a rookie. In his debut, against the Saskatchewan Roughriders, he converted both of his two field goal attempts and averaged 66.5 yards per kickoff. He was active in 19 regular-season games over two years. He made 24 of his 31 field goal attempts and 39 of his 41 convert attempts. However, he was released near the end of the 2024 season.

For the 2025 season, Faithfull joined the Outlaws Arena Football Team of the Arena Football One.

He joined the Paris Musketeers for the 2026 European Football Alliance season.
