= Glen Toonga =

British gridiron football player (born 1995)

No. 7 – Nordic Storm
- Position: Running back

Personal information
- Born: March 17, 1995 (age 31); London, England
- Listed height: 5 ft 11 in (1.80 m)
- Listed weight: 226 lb (103 kg)

Career information
- College: Southampton Stags

Career history
- London Blitz (2016–2017); Dresden Monarchs (2018–2019); Lowlanders Białystok (2020); Allgäu Comets (2020); Hamburg Sea Devils (2022); Rhein Fire (2023–2024); Nordic Storm (2025–present)

Awards and highlights
- GFL All-Star Team (2021); 2x ELF champion (2023, 2024); EFA champion (2026); 4× ELF MVP of the Week (2× 2022, 2× 2024); ELF All-Star First Team (2022, 2024); ELF All-Star Second Team (2023); ELF MVP (2024); EFA Comeback Player of the Year (2026)

Glen Mbeleg-Toonga (born March 17, 1995) is a British professional football running back for the Nordic Storm of the American Football League Europe (AFLE). He played college football at the University of Southampton.

== Early life ==
Toonga played association football and was active in track and field during his youth. While studying mathematics at the University of Southampton, he started playing American football in 2014. In 2015, he was named Offensive MVP of the university team, the Southampton Stags.

== Professional career ==
=== London Blitz ===
From 2016 to 2017, Toonga played for the London Blitz. With Toonga, the Blitz qualified for the Britbowl, the final of the British championship, each year, but lost both times. In 2017, Toonga was named the team's Offensive MVP. He was also called up to the Great Britain national team.

=== GFL and Lowlanders Białystok ===
For the 2018 season, Toonga transferred to the Dresden Monarchs in the German Football League (GFL). With the Monarchs, Toonga reached the semi-finals of the German championship in 2018 and 2019.

In the 2020 season, Toonga played for the Lowlanders Białystok (the GFL did not play due to the COVID-19 pandemic). The team reached the Polish Bowl but lost.

Toonga returned to the GFL in 2021. With the Allgäu Comets, he finished fourth in the GFL South and was eliminated in the quarterfinals by his former team from Dresden. Toonga was selected to the GFL All-Star Team.

=== Hamburg Sea Devils ===
For the 2022 season, Toonga was signed by the Hamburg Sea Devils in the European League of Football (ELF). In twelve games, he rushed for 1,468 yards and 21 touchdowns on 257 attempts, leading the league in these categories. He was named Most Valuable Player (MVP) in Weeks 5 and 9 and was selected to the 2022 ELF All-Star First Team. On September 10, 2022, prior to the Sea Devils' semifinal game, Toonga tested positive for cocaine by NADA, although the test result was not available until October. Since Toonga was able to prove that he did not use the substance during competition or for performance enhancement, he was suspended for three months in accordance with anti-doping regulations. Despite his good performance, his contract in Hamburg was not renewed because, according to General Manager Max Paatz, Toonga had "violated the values of our franchise and the league's statutes".

=== Rhein Fire ===
One day after his cocaine abuse became public, the Rhein Fire announced the signing of Toonga for the 2023 season. The league suspended him for the first four games. Toonga rushed for 926 yards and received for 77 yards. The Fire won the ELF championship without a single loss. The Fire would win the league title again the following season and Toonga himself was named the ELF MVP.

=== Nordic Storm ===
In November 2024, Toonga was signed by the newly formed Nordic Storm for the 2025 season. In his first season with the team, he tore his Achilles in Week 1, rendering him out for the rest of the season. During the 2026 season, he rushed 193 times with 1,061 yards, 11 touchdowns and averaged 5.50 yards per carry en route to winning the EFA Comeback Player of the Year and the league title.
