= Ola Kimrin =

American football player (born 1972)

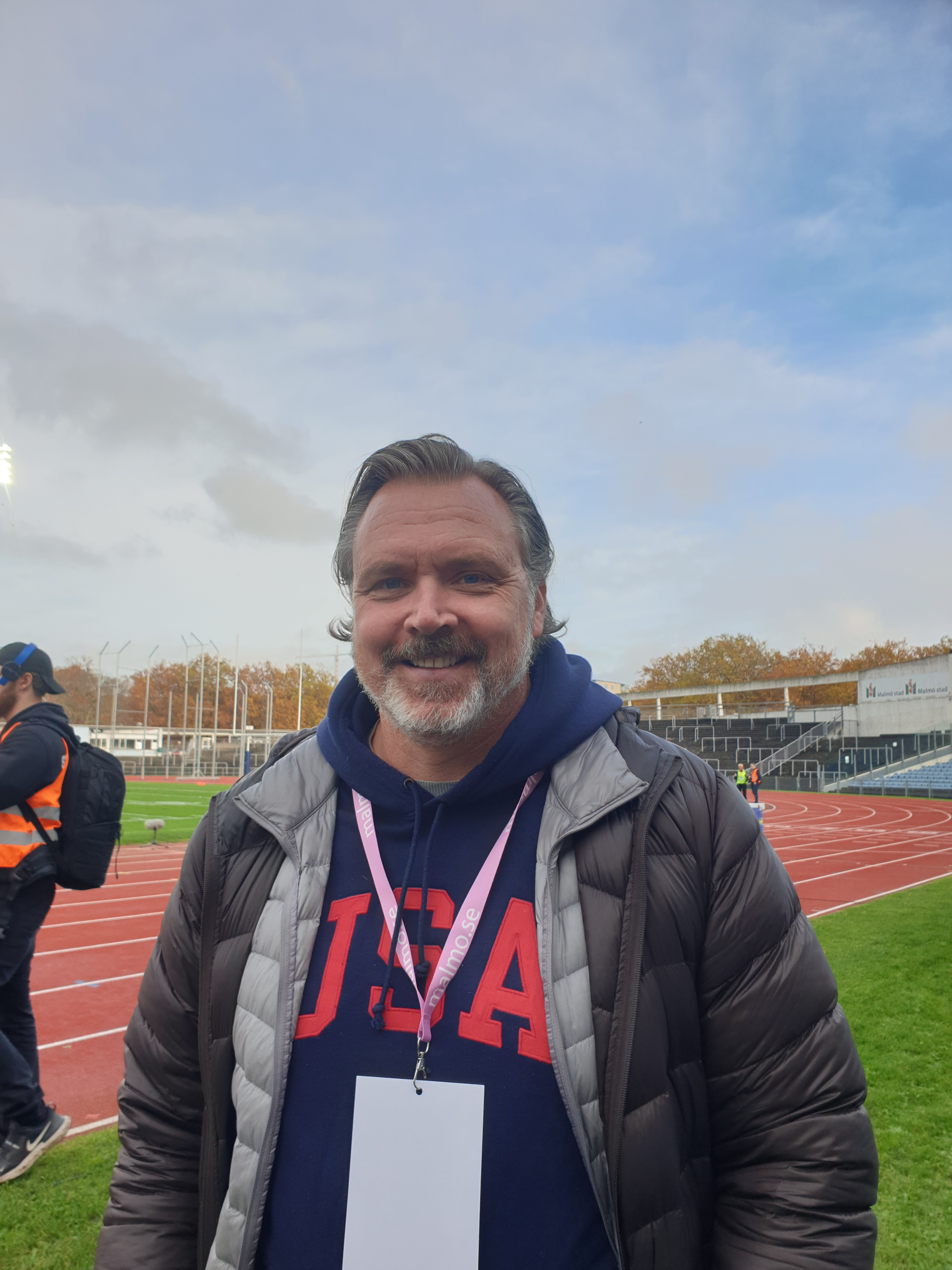
- Ola Kimrin, 2021

Nordic Storm
- Position: Placekicker
- Roster status: Inactive

Personal information
- Born: February 29, 1972 (age 54); Malmö, Sweden
- Listed height: 6 ft 3 in (1.91 m)
- Listed weight: 230 lb (104 kg)

Career information
- College: UTEP
- NFL draft: 1998: undrafted

Career history
- Frankfurt Galaxy (2001–2002); Denver Broncos (2002)*; Dallas Cowboys (2003)*; Cologne Centurions (2004); Washington Redskins (2004–2005); Tennessee Titans (2005); Miami Dolphins (2006)*; Nordic Storm (2025–present)*
- * Offseason or practice squad member only
- Stats at Pro Football Reference

Ola Kimrin
Medal record

Men's American football

Representing Sweden

World Championship
Bronze medal – third place	1999 Italy	Team competition

Ola Fredrik Andreas Kimrin (born February 29, 1972) is a Swedish American football placekicker who is a member of the Nordic Storm of the European League of Football (ELF).

== Background and college ==
Kimrin kicked for the Limhamn Griffins club team from 1995 to 1996. He played soccer for the Vintrie IK club team in Sweden from ages 5–20. Kimrin received a scholarship at the University of Texas at El Paso in 1996 and played three seasons for the Miners. He played 23 career games, primarily serving as kickoff specialist, and was five-of-eight on field goal attempts in 1997.

In 1999, he played on the Swedish national team that won third place (bronze) at the 1999 IFAF World Championship in Italy, the inaugural IFAF World Championship.

== Professional career ==
After going unselected in the 1998 NFL draft, Kimrin played for NFL Europe in 2001 and 2002. In the 2002 season, he led NFL Europe kickers in scoring (57 points) for the Frankfurt Galaxy, converting 12-of-24 field goals (long of 52) and 20-of-22 extra point attempts. On July 24, 2002, Kimrin signed a free agent contract with the Denver Broncos. On August 29, he kicked a 65-yard field goal in the final preseason game against the Seattle Seahawks. Despite the kick having the potential to eclipse the NFL record of 63 yards, at that time shared by Tom Dempsey (1970) and fellow Bronco Jason Elam (1998), it was in preseason and not officially recognized by the NFL. The potential record also would have survived the later kicks of 63 yards by Sebastian Janikowski, David Akers, Graham Gano, and Matt Prater (64 yards on 8 December 2013), all of which were surpassed by Justin Tucker (66 yards, for the record on 26 September 2021). More than 20 years later, Brandon Aubrey (66 yards, 2024) and Cam Little (70 yards, 2025) would surpass Kimrin's unofficial preseason record. Kimrin was released at the conclusion of camp in favor of veteran Jason Elam.

He then competed for a job with the Dallas Cowboys in 2003 during training camp, but lost out to Billy Cundiff. Prior to the 2004 NFL season, Kimrin spent the 2004 NFL Europe campaign with the Cologne Centurions, converting 4-of-4 field goal attempts and all 21 extra point attempts, good for 33 points on the season.

On July 31, 2004, he signed as a free agent with the Washington Redskins. He was 4-of-4 on field goals during preseason, but lost the job to veteran John Hall. On October 16, Kimrin was re-signed by Washington after Hall suffered a hamstring injury in practice, the former landing in Sweden by the time the team asked for him to return. Kimrin played in five regular season games, converting 6-of-10 field goals and all six extra point attempts, before he was released on November 27. On March 4, 2005, Kimrin was signed to the Tennessee Titans and released August 24. In 2006, he signed with the Miami Dolphins, but was released on August 29 and retired afterward.

== Post-NFL career ==
He is now retired and spends time with his family, but has participated as a coach for the Swedish national team and played in exhibition games in Europe.
