= Jamalcolm Liggins =

American football player (born 1996)

No. 0 – Paris Musketeers
- Position: Cornerback
- Roster status: Active
- CFL status: American

Personal information
- Born: April 26, 1996 (age 30); Memphis, Tennessee, U.S.
- Listed height: 6 ft 1 in (1.85 m)
- Listed weight: 208 lb (94 kg)

Career information
- High school: Bismarck (Bismarck, North Dakota)
- College: Dickinson State
- NFL draft: 2019: undrafted

Career history
- Philadelphia Eagles (2019)*; St. Louis BattleHawks (2020)*; Winnipeg Blue Bombers (2021)*; Bern Grizzlies (2022); Raiders Tirol (2022); Frankfurt Galaxy (2023–2024); Paris Musketeers (2025–present)
- * Offseason or practice squad member only

Awards and highlights
- Swiss Bowl champion 2022; ELF league all star 1st team (2023)
- Stats at CFL.ca

Jamalcolm "Jay" Liggins (born 26 April 1996) is an American football defensive back for the Paris Musketeers of the European League of Football (ELF). He played college football at Dickinson State.

== Youth and college career ==
Liggins attended Bismarck High School in North Dakota's capital city. He had also competed in track and field (long jump and triple jump) in high school and college, earning All-American honors. On the football team, he excelled as a senior and became a first-time starter for the Demons and was subsequently selected to the All-Region Team. As a result, he participated in the North Dakota Shrine Bowl in April 2014.

In 2014, Liggins committed to Dickinson State University in of the National Association of Intercollegiate Athletics (NAIA). He sat out his first year as a redshirt. In the following years, he won the conference four times with the Blue Hawks. In 2019, they advanced to the quarterfinals of the NAIA playoffs but were eliminated. During his collegiate career, Liggings was selected to the All-Conference team multiple times and was also named to the Second Team in 2017 and the All-American First Team in 2018. In addition, he was a finalist for the prestigious Cliff Harris Award. In March 2019, he attended the Pro Day at North Dakota State University and was also named to the All-Conference Team that year.

== Professional career ==
Pre-draft measurables
Height	Weight	Arm length	Hand span	40-yard dash	10-yard split	20-yard split	20-yard shuttle	Three-cone drill	Vertical jump	Broad jump	Bench press
6 ft 1 in (1.85 m)	209 lb (95 kg)	32 7/8 in (0.84 m)	10 1/4 in (0.26 m)	4.66 s	1.64 s	2.68 s	4.47 s	6.95 s	34 1/2 in (0.88 m)	10 ft 3 in (3.12 m)	12 reps
All values from Pro Day

=== North America ===
On April 28, 2019, Liggins was signed by the Philadelphia Eagles as an undrafted free agent. He appeared in two games during the preseason, recording four tackles, one tackle for loss, and one pass breakup. He was released by the Eagles in mid-August. Liggins was on the spring 2020 squad of the St. Louis BattleHawks of the XFL, but was released before the start of the season. On February 20, 2020, Liggins was signed by the Winnipeg Blue Bombers of the Canadian Football League (CFL) and released on July 30, 2021. He did not appear in any regular season games for the CFL team.

=== Europe ===
Liggins was signed by the Bern Grizzlies for the 2022 Swiss Nationalliga A (American football) season and won the Swiss Bowl championship with them. On 4 August, Liggins was introduced by the Raiders Tirol of the European League of Football (ELF) as a new signing midway through the 2022 season. In the remaining four games of the regular season, he recorded nine tackles, two interceptions, and eight pass break-ups. He reached the semifinals with the Raiders, where they lost to the Hamburg Sea Devils. In November 2022, Frankfurt Galaxy announced the signing of Liggins for the 2023 ELF season. He was named a 1st team ELF all star for the 2023 season. He resigned with the team on December 18, 2023. On May 12, 2025, Liggins signed with the Paris Musketeers.

=== Statistics ===
Year	Team	Games played	Starts	Tackles					Pass coverage				Fumbles			Other	
Year	Team	Games played	Starts	Total	Solo	Ast	TFL	Sack	INT	Yds	TD	BrUp	FF	FR	TD	Blk	Saf
European League of Football
2022	Raiders Tirol	4	4	9	6	3	0.0	0.0	2	22	0	8	0	0	0	0	0
2023	Frankfurt Galaxy	12	12	42	33	9	3.5	0	5	118	1	17	2	1	0	0	0
ELF Total		16	16	51	39	12	3.5	0.0	7	140	1	25	2	1	0	0	0
Source: stats.europeanleague.football

== Private life ==
Liggins has ten siblings. He grew up in Memphis, Tennessee and moved with his mother and siblings to Bismarck, North Dakota at the age of eleven. Initially, he sought a career in the U.S. military.
