= Jaylon Henderson =

American football player (born 1997)

Prague Lions
- Position: Quarterback
- Roster status: Active

Personal information
- Born: April 15, 1997 (age 29); Kingwood, Houston, Texas, U.S.
- Listed height: 6 ft 1 in (1.85 m)
- Listed weight: 210 lb (95 kg)

Career information
- High school: Kingwood Park
- College: UTSA (2015–2016); Trinity Valley CC (2017); Boise State (2018–2019)
- NFL draft: 2020: undrafted

Career history
- Vegas Knight Hawks (2022); Panasonic Impulse (2022); Potsdam Royals (2023–2024); Paris Musketeers (2025); Prague Lions (2026–present)

Awards and highlights
- 2× German Bowl champion (2023, 2024); X1 Super Rookie of the Year (2022)

Jaylon Henderson (born April 15, 1997) is an American football quarterback for the Prague Lions of the European Football Alliance (EFA). He won the GFL Bowl twice with the Potsdam Royals.

== College career ==
In 2016, Henderson was at the University of Texas at San Antonio, but remained redshirt. The following year, he transferred to Trinity Valley Community College. There, he completed 100 passes on 187 attempts, totaling 1,081 yards and nine touchdowns, with one interception. He eventually transferred to Boise State. He played in three games in the 2018 season. The following season, he made nine appearances, four of which were starts. He completed 89 passes on 143 attempts for 1,080 yards and twelve touchdowns, with two interceptions. He won the Mountain West Conference championship with the Broncos and was named Offensive Most Valuable Player of the finals.

== Professional career ==
After working as a financial professional for a year and a half, Henderson returned to football, playing for the Vegas Knight Hawks of the Indoor Football League during the 2022 season. After the season, he played for the Panasonic Impulse in the Japanese X-League, reaching the Rice Bowl undefeated, but lost there. In eight games, he completed 107 passes on 166 attempts for 1,484 yards and 15 touchdowns with five interceptions. For the 2023 season, he joined the Potsdam Royals in the German Football League (GFL). With the Royals, he won the German championship twice in a row, even in a perfect season in 2024.

On February 21, 2025, Henderson signed with the Paris Musketeers.

On December 7, 2025, Henderson signed with the Prague Lions.
