= Jadrian Clark =

American football player (born 1994)

No. 18 – Nordic Storm
- Position: Quarterback

Personal information
- Born: April 22, 1994 (age 32); Indianapolis, Indiana, U.S.
- Listed height: 6 ft 3 in (1.91 m)
- Listed weight: 225 lb (102 kg)

Career information
- High school: Lakeland (Lakeland, Florida)
- College: Weber State (2012–2016); UWE Bristol (2024)
- NFL draft: 2017: undrafted

Career history
- Kirchdorf Wildcats (2017); New Yorker Lions (2018); Schwäbisch Hall Unicorns (2019); Vienna Vikings (2020); Hamburg Sea Devils (2021); Lübeck Cougars (2022); Rhein Fire (2022–2024); Nordic Storm (2025–present)

Awards and highlights
- GFL2 South champion (2017); Eurobowl MVP (2018); Eurobowl champion (XXXII); 2020 AFL Champion; 2x ELF champion (2023, 2024); EFA champion (2026); ELF MVP (2023); EFA MVP (2026)

Jadrian Clark (born April 22, 1994) is an American professional football quarterback for the Nordic Storm of the American Football League Europe (AFLE). He is a Eurobowl champion, two-time ELF champion, one-time EFA champion and the latter two respective league's Most Valuable Player in 2023 and 2026. He played college football at Weber State and UWE Bristol.

== Early life ==
Born in Indianapolis, Indiana and raised in Lakeland, Florida, Clark attended Lakeland High School, where he played on the school's football team.

== College career ==
Clark attended Weber State University and played for its football team. During his time at Weber State, he posted 6,568 yards of total offense, 5,810 of them in passing. He also threw 40 touchdown passes and rushed for 758 yards, the latter being the second most by a Weber State quarterback.

After the 2023 ELF season, Clark enrolled at UWE Bristol in Bristol, where played for the local university team and went undefeated to become champions of the university league, in which he was named MVP of the final.

== Professional career ==
=== GFL and Vienna Vikings ===
In 2017, Clark began his professional career with the Kirchdorf Wildcats of the German Football League 2 (GFL2). That season, he posted a completion average of 63.3%, threw 46 touchdown passes and 3,206 yards, helping them win the GFL2 South title and promotion to the German Football League (GFL). In 2018, Clark spent his lone season with the New Yorker Lions, where he led the team to the GFL semifinals and the Eurobowl title. In November 2018, he was signed by the Schwäbisch Hall Unicorns for the 2019 season, where he had led them to German Bowl XLI. The following season, he moved to the Vienna Vikings of the Austrian Football League, where he helped them win the Austrian title.

=== Hamburg Sea Devils and Lübeck Cougars ===
Clark spend the 2021 season with the Hamburg Sea Devils, where he led the team to the EFL Championship Game, losing to the Frankfurt Galaxy. He then spent the first six games of the 2022 season with the Lübeck Cougars of GFL2, posting a 4–2 record at the time of his departure.

=== Rhein Fire ===
In July 2022, Clark signed with the Rhein Fire, where he replaced the injured Matt Adam for the remainder of the season. In the 2023 season, he played his first full season for the Fire, in which was named ELF Most Valuable Player at the end of the season and won his first ELF championship, while also being named MVP of the championship game for the first time. He would win his second and last ELF title with the team in the following season, in which was named the MVP of the championship game once again.

=== Nordic Storm ===
In November 2024, Clark signed with the newly formed Nordic Storm for the 2025 season. Following that season, Clark re-signed a contract with the Storm, after which his team left the ELF and helped formed the European Football Alliance (EFA), During the 2026 season, he posted a rating of 136.3, completion percentage of 71.1, threw for 47 touchdowns, seven interceptions and 3,726 yards en route to winning the EFA MVP and the league title.

== Season statistics ==
Year	Team	Games	Passing game								Running game					
Year	Team	Games	Cmp	Att	Qte	Yds	Avg	TD	Int	Eff	Att	Yds	Avg	TD	Fum	Lst
German Football League / German Football League 2
2017	Kirchdorf Wildcats	13	255	403	63.3	3,578	8.9	51	10	121.1	88	151	1.7	6	0	0
2018	New Yorker Lions	16	270	440	61.4	3,627	8.4	45	11	111.2	112	428	3.8	11	0	0
2019	Schwäbisch Hall Unicorns	17	244	379	64.4	4,009	10.5	51	10	128.4	111	455	4.1	13	0	0
GFL Total		46	769	1,222	62.9	11,214	9.2	147	31	121.8	311	1,034	3.3	30	0	0
Source: http://stats.gfl.info/
European League of Football
2021	Hamburg Sea Devils	9	129	217	59.5	1,383	6.8	15	10	82.0	47	201	4.3	1	1	1
2022	Rhein Fire	6	125	194	64.4	2,118	10.9	23	5	130.0	22	117	5.3	0	3	1
2023	Rhein Fire	12	237	361	65.7	3,586	9.9	53	7	129.7	17	37	2.2	0	0	0
2024	Rhein Fire	12	171	252	67.9	2,215	8.8	27	8	117.7	14	64	4.6	1	3	3
ELF Total		39	663	1,024	64.7	9,302	9.1	118	30	120.0	100	419	4.2	2	7	5
Source: sportsmetrics.football
