= Markus Kuhn =

Markus Kuhn may refer to:

- Markus Kuhn (computer scientist) (born 1971), German computer scientist
- Markus Kuhn (American football) (born 1986), German American football defensive tackle
