= Jack Del Rio =

American football player and coach (born 1963)

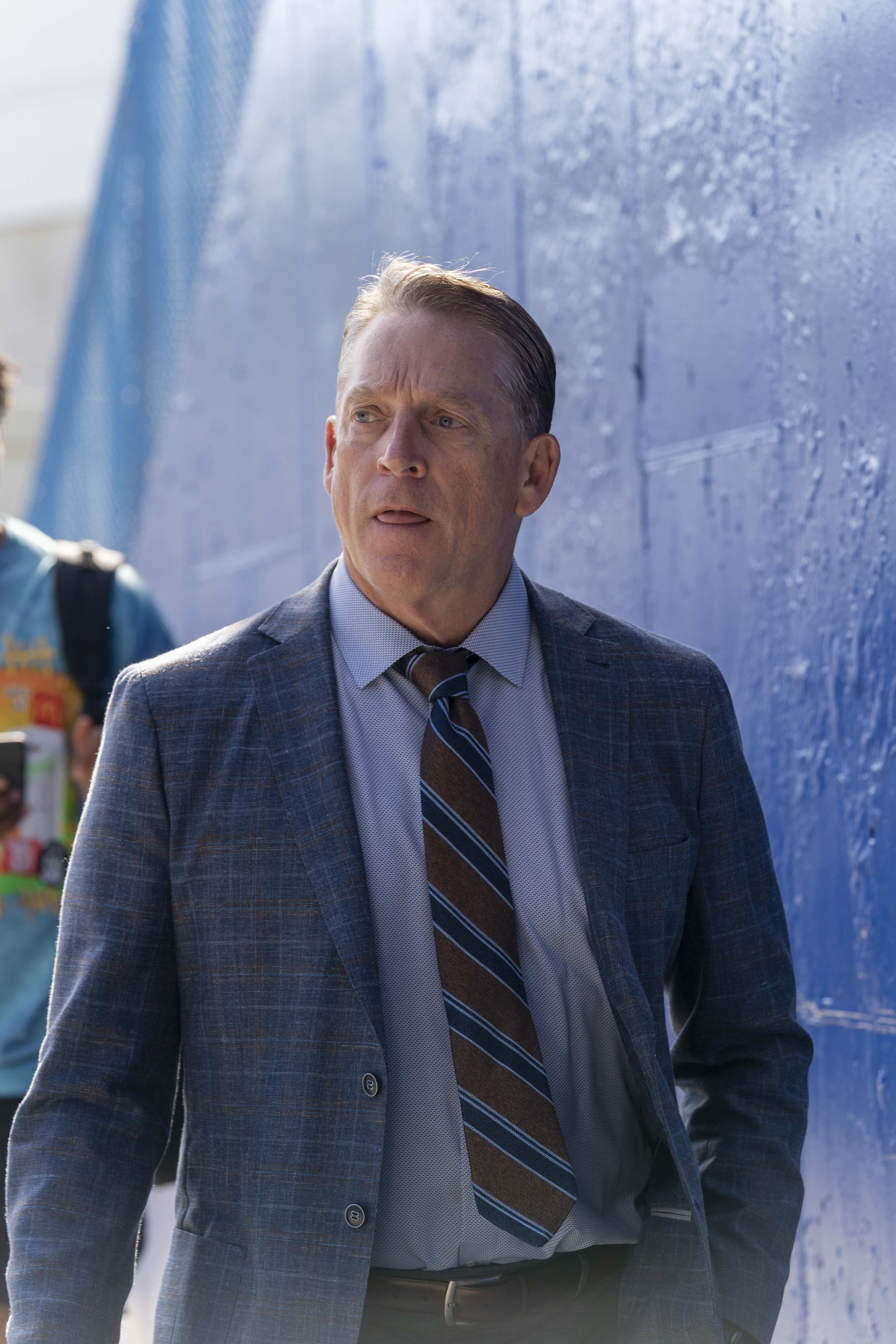
- Del Rio in 2021

Paris Musketeers
- Title: Head coach

Personal information
- Born: April 4, 1963 (age 63); Castro Valley, California, U.S.
- Listed height: 6 ft 4 in (1.93 m)
- Listed weight: 246 lb (112 kg)

Career information
- Position: Linebacker (No. 50, 55)
- High school: Hayward (Hayward, California)
- College: USC (1981–1984)
- NFL draft: 1985: 3rd round, 68th overall pick

Career history

Playing
- New Orleans Saints (1985–1986); Kansas City Chiefs (1987–1988); Dallas Cowboys (1989–1991); Minnesota Vikings (1992–1995); Miami Dolphins (1996)*
- * Offseason or practice squad member only

Coaching
- New Orleans Saints (1997) Assistant strength coach; New Orleans Saints (1998) Linebackers coach; Baltimore Ravens (1999–2001) Linebackers coach; Carolina Panthers (2002) Defensive coordinator; Jacksonville Jaguars (2003–2011) Head coach; Denver Broncos (2012–2014) Defensive coordinator; Oakland Raiders (2015–2017) Head coach; Washington Football Team / Commanders (2020–2023) Defensive coordinator; Wisconsin (2024) Senior advisor to the head coach; Paris Musketeers (2025–present) Head coach

Awards and highlights
- Playing: Pro Bowl (1994); PFWA All-Rookie Team (1985); Pop Warner Trophy (1984); Consensus All-American (1984); Third-team All-American (1983); 2× First-team All-Pac-10 (1982, 1983); Second-team All-Pac-10 (1984); USC Athletic Hall of Fame (2015); Coaching: Super Bowl champion (XXXV); Greasy Neale Award (2016)

Career NFL statistics
- Tackles: 1,005
- Sacks: 13
- Interceptions: 13
- Forced fumbles: 12
- Touchdowns: 3
- Stats at Pro Football Reference

Head coaching record
- Regular season: 93–94 (.497)
- Postseason: 1–3 (.250)
- Career: 94–97 (.492)
- Coaching profile at Pro Football Reference

Jack Louis Del Rio Jr. (born April 4, 1963) is an American professional football coach and former linebacker who is the head coach of the Paris Musketeers of the European Football Alliance (EFA). He played college football for the USC Trojans from 1981 to 1984 and was selected by the New Orleans Saints in the third round of the 1985 NFL draft. Del Rio also played for the Kansas City Chiefs, Dallas Cowboys, Minnesota Vikings, and Miami Dolphins before retiring in 1996.

Del Rio began his coaching career as an assistant with the Saints in 1997. He then joined the Baltimore Ravens as a linebacker coach in 1999, where he was a part of their Super Bowl XXXV winning team that beat the New York Giants. Following a single-season stint as Carolina Panthers defensive coordinator, Del Rio became head coach of the Jacksonville Jaguars in 2003. He compiled a 68–71 record and two playoff appearances with them before being dismissed following the 2011 season.

Del Rio served as Denver Broncos defensive coordinator for the next three seasons before becoming head coach of the Oakland Raiders in 2015. He compiled a 25–23 record with the Raiders before being fired after the 2017 season. He spent the next two years working as an NFL analyst for ESPN and as the defensive coordinator of the Washington Commanders from 2020 until being dismissed midway through the 2023 season.

== Early life ==
Jack Louis Del Rio Jr. was born in Castro Valley, California, to big bandleader Jack Del Rio Sr., who was of Mexican-Spanish descent, and an Italian-American mother. Famed singer Peggy Lee was briefly Del Rio's stepmother after having married Jack Sr. Del Rio attended Hayward High School in Hayward, California, where he developed into a notable three-sport athlete, earning all-state honors in football, baseball, and basketball.

In football, Del Rio helped his team win a North Coast Section 2A Championship. In baseball, although he was the starting catcher, in one game Del Rio was used as a pitcher and struck out 16 in a playoff game against Mission San Jose-Fremont. Del Rio and future Seattle Mariners manager Don Wakamatsu were teammates in baseball and football.

== College career ==
Del Rio was selected out of high school by the Toronto Blue Jays in the 22nd round (550th overall) of the 1981 MLB draft, but opted instead to accept a scholarship from the University of Southern California to play both football and baseball. In baseball, Del Rio was as a two-year starter at catcher on a team that also included future Major League Baseball players Mark McGwire and Randy Johnson, as well as future baseball executive Damon Oppenheimer.

Del Rio was a four-year starter in football. As a junior, he made the third-team 1983 All-American team. As a senior, Del Rio earned consensus All-American honors, was a runner-up for the Lombardi Award given to the nation's best lineman or linebacker and was named along with quarterback Tim Green co-MVP of the Rose Bowl. Del Rio finished his college career with 340 tackles, including 58 tackles for loss. He was named to the second-team All-Pac-10 in 1984, the first time in his college career where he did not make first-team.

In 2015, Del Rio was inducted into the USC Athletic Hall of Fame.

== Professional career ==
=== New Orleans Saints ===
Del Rio was selected by the New Orleans Saints in the third round (68th overall) of the 1985 NFL draft. He was also selected by the Los Angeles Express in the 1985 USFL Territorial Draft. As a rookie, Del Rio started nine games at right inside linebacker, tied a franchise record with five fumble recoveries (including one returned for a 22-yard touchdown) and earned NFL All-rookie honors. He also collected 68 tackles, five passes defensed and three forced fumbles. In 1986, Del Rio lost his starting position to Alvin Toles after the season opener and recorded only 20 tackles during the season.

=== Kansas City Chiefs ===
In August 1987, Del Rio was traded to the Kansas City Chiefs in exchange for a fifth round draft choice, reuniting him with former Saints defensive coordinator John Paul Young. He started nine games at right outside linebacker, tallying 45 tackles, two sacks and a forced fumble.

That season, the NFL players went on strike in September, after week two. Throughout this period of time, Del Rio and teammates picketed outside of Arrowhead Stadium and were vigilantly watching for replacement players attempting to enter the facility. He mistakenly mistook former Chiefs wide receiver Otis Taylor for a replacement player and assaulted him. At the time, the 45-year-old Taylor was a scout for the Chiefs organization and had been retired for twelve years. Taylor later pressed charges and the two eventually settled out of court.

Del Rio started ten games at left outside linebacker in 1988, registering 77 tackles, one sack, and one pass defensed. He was released on August 29, 1989.

Del Rio earned an undergraduate degree in political science from the University of Kansas while he was a player for the Kansas City Chiefs.

=== Dallas Cowboys ===
On August 30, 1989, Del Rio was claimed off waivers by the Dallas Cowboys. He was named the starter at strongside linebacker in the fifth game against the Green Bay Packers, where he suffered a bruised calf that forced him to miss the next two games. Del Rio started twelve contests at strongside linebacker, while sharing the position with David Howard in the final eight games, playing in the first and third quarters, finishing the season with 58 tackles, two fumble recoveries (including one returned for a 57-yard touchdown) and one pass defensed.

The next year, Del Rio started all sixteen games at strongside linebacker, making 104 tackles (third on the team), 1.5 sacks, four quarterback pressures and two passes defensed. In 1991, Del Rio replaced Eugene Lockhart as the starter at middle linebacker, while leading the team with 130 total tackles, 53 assists and 77 solo tackles.

In the 1990s, the Cowboys organization felt they could avoid paying a premium and adversely impacting the salary cap by drafting linebackers, so they allowed players like Del Rio, Ken Norton Jr., Darrin Smith, Dixon Edwards, Robert Jones, and Randall Godfrey to leave via free agency.

=== Minnesota Vikings ===
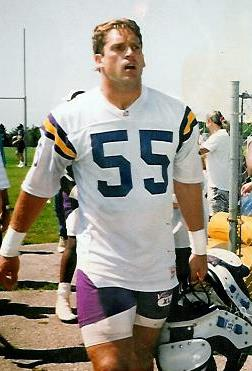
Del Rio with the Minnesota Vikings (c. mid-1990s)

On March 4, 1992, Del Rio signed with the Minnesota Vikings as a free agent. He led the team in tackles for three consecutive years and was selected to the 1995 Pro Bowl.

In 1995, Del Rio suffered a knee injury in a game against the Chicago Bears and only played one more game that season, which would prove to be the last of his career.

=== Miami Dolphins ===
On June 2, 1996, Del Rio signed a one-year contract with the Miami Dolphins, reuniting him with former Cowboys head coach Jimmy Johnson. On August 4, he was released after being passed on the depth chart by rookie Zach Thomas. Del Rio finished his career with 160 game appearances (128 starts), 1,005 tackles, 13 sacks, and 13 interceptions. (Note: Some sources say he recorded 1,078 tackles and 12 sacks)

== NFL career statistics ==
Year	Team	Games		Tackles				Interceptions				Fumbles		
Year	Team	GP	GS	Cmb	Solo	Ast	Sck	PD	Int	Yds	TD	FF	FR	TD
1985	NO	16	9	68	0	0	0.0	0	2	13	0	3	5	1
1986	NO	16	1	20	0	0	0.0	0	0	0	0	3	0	0
1987	KC	10	7	44	0	0	3.0	0	0	0	0	1	0	0
1988	KC	15	10	77	0	0	1.0	0	1	0	0	0	1	0
1989	DAL	14	12	58	0	0	0.0	0	0	0	0	0	2	1
1990	DAL	16	16	104	0	0	1.5	0	0	0	0	1	0	0
1991	DAL	16	16	130	0	0	0.0	0	0	0	0	1	1	0
1992	MIN	16	16	153	0	0	2.0	0	2	92	1	1	2	0
1993	MIN	16	16	169	0	0	0.5	0	4	3	0	1	0	0
1994	MIN	16	16	129	86	43	2.0	0	3	5	0	1	2	0
1995	MIN	9	9	53	32	21	3.0	0	1	15	0	0	1	0
Total		160	128	1,005	118	64	13.0	0	13	128	1	12	14	2

== Coaching career ==
Del Rio was hired by New Orleans Saints head coach Mike Ditka as the team's strength and conditioning coach in 1997, moving to linebacker coach the next year. In 1999, he took the same job with the Baltimore Ravens. Del Rio is, in part, credited for the success of the Ravens' Super Bowl-winning defense, particularly in the 2000 season. After the 2001 season, he was named defensive coordinator of the Carolina Panthers and in his first season, in 2002, Del Rio led them to the second ranked defense in the league by total yards.

=== Jacksonville Jaguars ===
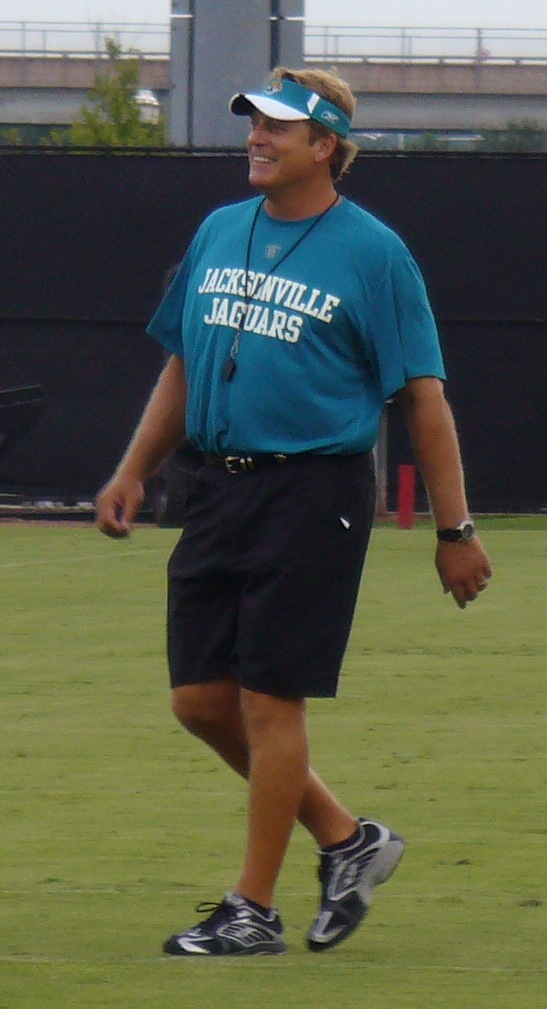
Del Rio as head coach of the Jacksonville Jaguars, 2008

In 2003, Del Rio became the second head coach of the Jacksonville Jaguars following Tom Coughlin's dismissal. In his first season, Del Rio led the team to a 5–11 record. That year, Jacksonville finished the season with the second-ranked rush defense and sixth best overall defense, having ranked 25th and 20th in those two categories, respectively, the year prior. In 2004, the Jaguars narrowly missed the playoffs with a 9–7 record, the first winning record in five seasons. The following season, the team made the playoffs for the first time since advancing all the way to the AFC title game in 1999. They qualified as a wild card, but the season was ended with a 28–3 loss to the New England Patriots.

The mantra "keep chopping wood", introduced by Del Rio during the season, was intended to indicate how the team would slowly whittle away the huge obstacles in front of them. Del Rio placed a wooden stump and axe in the Jaguars' locker room as a symbol of his rallying cry. After his teammates had been taking swings at the wood with the axe, punter Chris Hanson followed suit and seriously wounded his non-kicking foot. Hanson missed the remainder of the 2003 season, being replaced by Mark Royals.

After missing the playoffs in 2006, Jacksonville cut quarterback Byron Leftwich in favor of David Garrard. The team returned to the playoffs in 2007 winning their first playoff game since 1999. On April 3, 2008, Del Rio's contract with the Jaguars was extended through the 2012 season.

On January 11, 2010, Del Rio was offered the head coaching job at USC, his alma mater. The next day he denied receiving an offer from USC, stating that the offer was "manufactured". Later that afternoon, he rebuffed USC officially, announcing that he would remain with the Jaguars at least through the duration of his current contract.

On November 29, 2011, Del Rio was fired as Jacksonville's head coach. He left with a regular season record of 68–71 and a 1–2 record in two playoff appearances over his nine years. From his years with the Jaguars, Del Rio holds the NFL record for the longest tenure of any head coach to have never won a division title.

=== Denver Broncos ===
On January 27, 2012, Del Rio was hired as the new defensive coordinator of the Denver Broncos. In Week 2, Del Rio was fined $25,000 for berating the replacement officials. On November 4, 2013, Del Rio was handed the head coaching duties and named interim head coach for several games when head coach John Fox was sidelined for medical reasons.

=== Oakland Raiders ===
On January 14, 2015, Del Rio was hired to become the new head coach of the Oakland Raiders, replacing the fired Dennis Allen (who coincidentally had preceded him as the Broncos defensive coordinator) and interim head coach Tony Sparano.

In 2016, Del Rio led the Raiders to a 12–4 record, with the team making the playoffs for the first time since 2002. They lost to the Houston Texans in the Wild Card round.

On February 10, 2017, Del Rio signed a four-year contract extension. He was fired after the Raiders' 30–10 loss to the Los Angeles Chargers in the 2017 regular season finale, ending with a 6–10 record.

In 2019, Del Rio was under consideration to become the defensive coordinator of the Cincinnati Bengals, but talks ultimately ended after new head coach Zac Taylor decided that he was not a fit.

=== Washington Football Team / Commanders ===
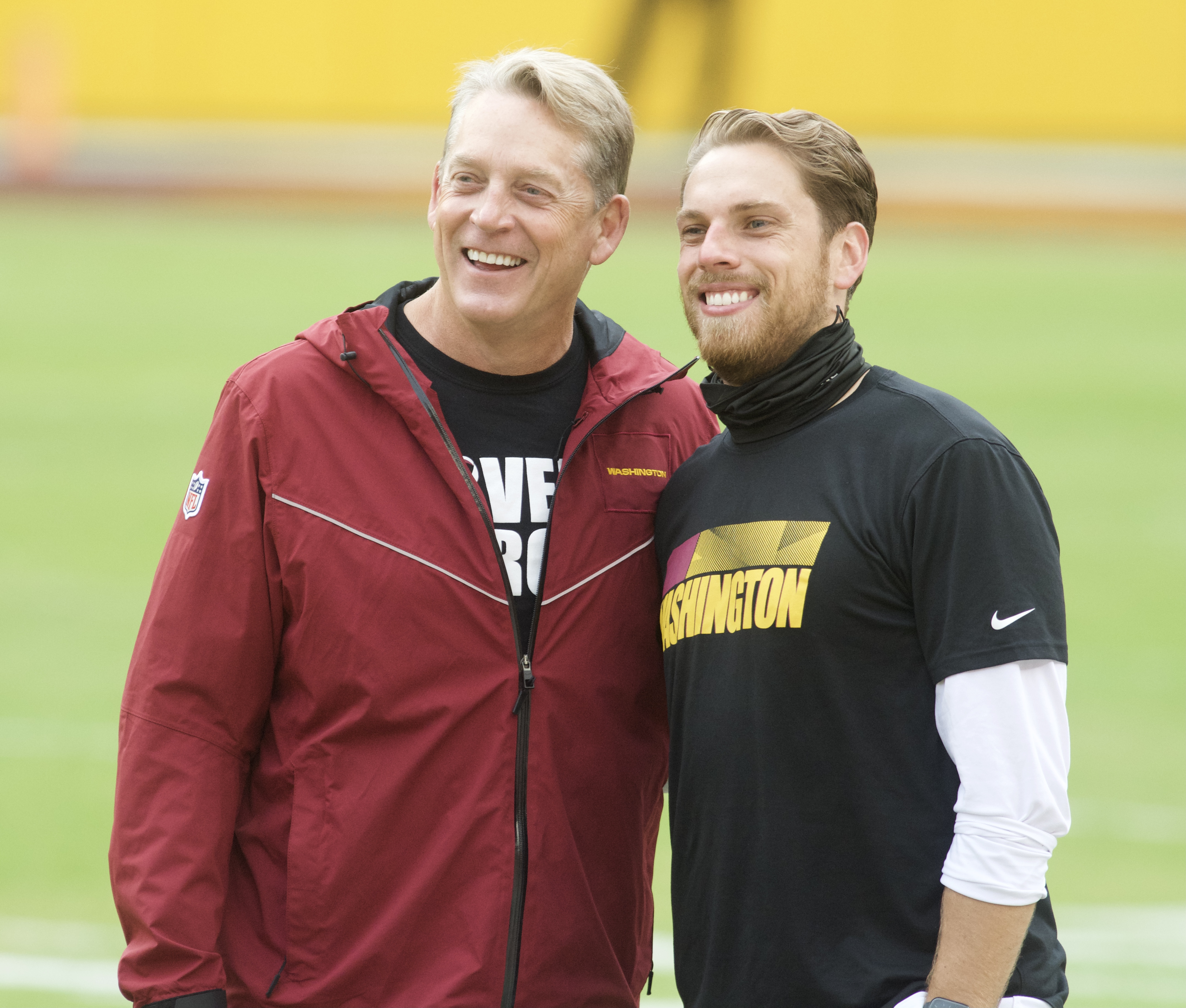
Del Rio and his son Luke in 2020

On January 2, 2020, Del Rio was hired by the Washington Redskins to serve as their defensive coordinator under head coach Ron Rivera. Del Rio changed their defensive scheme from a 3-4, which the team had used for the past decade, to a 4-3. In his first season as defensive coordinator, he led the temporarily-renamed Washington Football Team to second in total yards and fourth in points allowed, marking the first time since 2008 the team had finished top 10 in defense.

In June 2022, Del Rio made a controversial comment to reporters, calling the Capitol attack a "dust up" compared with the civil unrest that occurred during some of the 2020 George Floyd protests. In response to his comments, the Commanders fined Del Rio for $100,000 along with head coach Ron Rivera publicly stating Del Rio's views are not a reflection of the team. Del Rio was fired in November 2023 following a 45–10 road loss to the Dallas Cowboys on Thanksgiving, in which the team had allowed the most points in the NFL by that point in the season.

=== Wisconsin Badgers ===
On August 29, 2024, Del Rio was hired by the Wisconsin Badgers as a senior adviser to head football coach Luke Fickell. He resigned on November 11 after being arrested days prior for hitting a street sign and breaking a fence in Madison, Wisconsin, while operating a car impaired.

=== Paris Musketeers ===
On January 27, 2025, Del Rio was hired as the head coach and defensive coordinator for the Paris Musketeers of the European League of Football (ELF).

== Head coaching record ==
=== NFL ===
Team	Year	Regular season					Postseason			
Team	Year	Won	Lost	Ties	Win%	Finish	Won	Lost	Win %	Result
JAX	2003	5	11	0	.313	3rd in AFC South	—	—	—	—
JAX	2004	9	7	0	.563	2nd in AFC South	—	—	—	—
JAX	2005	12	4	0	.750	2nd in AFC South	0	1	.000	Lost to New England Patriots in AFC Wild Card Game
JAX	2006	8	8	0	.500	3rd in AFC South	—	—	—	—
JAX	2007	11	5	0	.688	2nd in AFC South	1	1	.500	Lost to New England Patriots in AFC Divisional Game
JAX	2008	5	11	0	.313	4th in AFC South	—	—	—	—
JAX	2009	7	9	0	.438	4th in AFC South	—	—	—	—
JAX	2010	8	8	0	.500	2nd in AFC South	—	—	—	—
JAX	2011	3	8	0	.273	Fired	—	—	—	—
JAX total		68	71	0	.489		1	2	.333	—
OAK	2015	7	9	0	.438	3rd in AFC West	—	—	—	—
OAK	2016	12	4	0	.750	2nd in AFC West	0	1	.000	Lost to Houston Texans in AFC Wild Card Game
OAK	2017	6	10	0	.375	3rd in AFC West	—	—	—	—
OAK total		25	23	0	.521		0	1	.000	—
Total		93	94	0	.497		1	3	.250	—

=== ELF ===
Team	Year	Regular season					Postseason			
Team	Year	Won	Lost	Ties	Win %	Finish	Won	Lost	Win %	Result
PM	2025	7	5	0	.583	2nd in West Division	—	—	—	—
Total		7	5	0	.583	—	—	—	—	—

== Awards and honors ==
- Selected to USC Athletic Hall of Fame (2014)
- NCAA Silver Anniversary award (2010)
- Super Bowl champion (XXXV) as coach
- All-Pro selection (1994)
- Pro Bowl selection (1994)
- NFL's All-Rookie Team (1985)
- Saints' Rookie of the Year (1985)
- CO-MVP of Rose Bowl (1985)
- All-America honors as a senior (1984)
- Pop Warner Trophy (1984)

== Personal life ==
After he was drafted to play for the New Orleans Saints, Del Rio married his wife Linda Del Rio. The couple have four children: Lauren, Hope, Aubrey Jean, and Luke, who played quarterback for the Florida Gators in the mid-2010s and is an offensive analyst for the Washington Huskies.

In 2019, Del Rio worked as an analyst for ESPN.
