= Nordic Storm =

American football team from Denmark

- Current season
Logo

General information
- Founded: September 21, 2024
- Headquartered: Copenhagen, Denmark
- Colors: Light Blue, Dark Blue, White

Personnel
- Owners: Michael Weidick Planeta; Stephen Schueler
- General manager: Bjørn Stadil
- Head coach: John Shoop
- President: Stephen Schueler

Team history
- Nordic Storm (2025–present)

Home fields
- Gladsaxe Stadium (2025–present)

League / conference affiliations
- American Football League Europe (2027–present); European Football Alliance (2026); European League of Football - North Division (2025)

Championships
- League championships: 1 EFA: 2026
- Division championships: 1 ELF North 2025

Playoff appearances (2)
- ELF 2025; EFA 2026

The Nordic Storm is an American football team based in Copenhagen, Denmark. The Storm compete in the American Football League Europe (AFLE). The team plays its home games at Gladsaxe Stadium.

== History ==
=== Founding ===
The Storm were announced as the 18th team to join the European League of Football on September 21, 2024. They are regarded as representing both Copenhagen and Malmö, Sweden, the two cities connected by the Øresund Bridge. This makes them the first ELF franchise in Scandinavia and the first one to represent two countries. Players from both Denmark and Sweden are considered homegrown players under the league's rules. Later, in January 2025, these rules were modified to give other teams access to players from certain neighboring countries as well.

The ownership group consists of several Danish businessmen with connections to the Danish American football community. Palle Navntoft Christensen was appointed as the Storm's first general manager. On October 3, former NFL offensive coordinator and Munich Ravens head coach John Shoop was named as the Nordic Storm's first head coach. On April 28, 2025, it was announced that Stephen Schueler would join as Co-Owner and Board Member of Nordic Storm. Schueler is the President of the American Club Denmark and the great-grandson of a former U.S. Ambassador to Denmark. His primary role will be to advance American relations for the team.

=== European League of Football (2025) ===
The Nordic Storm finished their sole ELF season with a 10-2 record, winning the North Division title. The Storm defeated the Rhein Fire at Gladsaxe Stadium in the Wildcard Round 28-23, losing in the semifinals to the Vienna Vikings 28-20.

=== EFA and AFLE (2026–present) ===
In October 2025, the Nordic Storm were one of ten franchises that announced that they would not be competing in the European League of Football in 2026. This decision led to the formation of 2 new leagues in Europe, with the Storm joining the European Football Alliance. They were among the 6 teams announced to play in the inaugural season. The Storm concluded the season with a 9-1 record, finishing at the top of the EFA standings and clinching a playoff berth. In the BIG4 playoffs, the Storm defeated the Paris Musketeers 45-6 to advance to the EFA Championship Game, where they beat the Munich Ravens 48-28 to claim their first league title.

After winning the inaugural EFA title, it was announced on 5 November 2026 that the Storm would be joining the American Football League Europe (AFLE). The AFLE described the move as "a step toward a more unified European football landscape."

== Stadium ==
The Storm play their home games at Gladsaxe Stadium in Søborg.

== Roster ==
Nordic Storm roster
Quarterbacks: 12 (Denmark) Alexander Bjerre; 18 (United States) Jadrian Clark; Running backs: 2 (Sweden) Jordan Genmark Heath; 8 (Sweden) Alexander Kennedy; 30 (Sweden) Alexander Nesic; 42 (France) Armand Soulerot; 21 (Denmark) Anton Witmeur; Wide receivers: 85 (Denmark) Oscar Andersen; 19 (United States) Brendan Beaulieu; 1 (Denmark) Simon Føns; 85 (Denmark) Jakob Green; 82 (Sweden) Elliot Reer; 5 (Sweden) Edvin Taborda; Tight ends: 87 (Spain) Adria Botella; 4 (Denmark) Jonathan Nielsen; 88 (Denmark) Oliver Tribler	Offensive linemen: 51 (Sweden) Ludvig Burell T; 75 (Denmark) Joachim Christensen C; 79 (Denmark) Frederik Fabricius T; 63 (Denmark) Mikkel Hansen C; 74 (Denmark) Mathias Hummelmose T; 68 (Sweden) Love Larsson G; 60 (Denmark) Nicholas Møller-Hansen G; 65 (Denmark) Benjamin Qvist G; 78 (Iceland) Stefán Stefánsson T; 52 (Sweden) David Strobel G; 77 (Sweden) Samuel Wretman T; Defensive linemen: 15 (Sweden) Benjamin Egbudiwe DT; 93 (Denmark) Kristoffer Hansen DT; 91 (Denmark) Joachim Heidelbach DE; 67 (Sweden) Elliot Heijmer DT; 13 (Sweden) Emil Hovde DE; 95 (Denmark) Mads Neilsen DT; 97 (United Kingdom) Max Parkinson DE; 90 (Sweden) Mark-Eric Rosenquist DT	Linebackers: 40 (Sweden) Joshua Akena; 55 (Sweden) Hugo Dyrendahl; 44 (United Kingdom) Emmanuelle Falola MLB; 48 (Denmark) Kristoffer Jensen; 41 (Sweden) Edvin Jönsson ILB; 39 (Denmark) Edin Mahmutovic; 38 (Denmark) Lucas Mortensen; 6 (Denmark) David Tawake; Defensive backs: 22 (Denmark) Jakob Bækgaard FS; 23 (United States) Clifton Duck CB; 10 (United States) Luke Glenna FS; 27 (Denmark) Christopher Jørgensen FS; 25 (United Kingdom) Khalid Adisa CB; 33 (Sweden) Elliot Krogius CB; 20 (Denmark) Kenneth Larsen-Ledet FS; 9 (Denmark) Hjalmar Nielsen SS; 3 (United Kingdom) Chad Walrond SS; Special teams: 14 (Denmark) Julius Eriksen K	Reserve lists: -- (Denmark) Jakob Blønd K; -- (Sweden) Morgan Boney T; 99 (Denmark) Marcus Boesen DE; 11 (Denmark) Philip Boye SS; 7 (United States) Exavier Edwards CB; -- (Denmark) Sverri Finsson LB; 24 (Sweden) William James FS; -- (Sweden) Ola Kimrin K; 0 (Sweden) Ludvig Myrén LB; 80 (Sweden) Olof Nilsson WR; 17 (United Kingdom) Glen Toonga RB; Practice squad: -- (Denmark) Michel Konate RB; 34 (Denmark) Oscar Latrache CB; 83 (Denmark) Martin Møller WR; Rookies in italics Roster updated Jul 29, 2025; 4 A-import, 4 E-import, 45 homegrown 53 active, 3 practice squad

== Honors ==
=== Team ===
League Championships

Season	League	Coach	Opponent	Score	Location
2026	EFA	John Shoop	Munich Ravens	48-28	Tivoli Stadion Tirol (Innsbruck)

Division Championships

Season	League	Coach	Division	Record
2025	ELF	John Shoop	North	10-2

=== Players ===
Honor	Player Name	Season
EFA Most Valuable Player	(United States) Jadrian Clark	2026
EFA Offensive Player of the Year	(United States) Brendan Beaulieu	2026
EFA Defensive Player of the Year	(United States) Luke Glenna	2026
EFA Offensive Lineman of the Year	(Sweden) Victor Stoffel	2026
EFA Comeback Player of the Year	(United Kingdom) Glen Toonga	2026
