= Patrick Esume =

German American football coach, commentator, TV-announcer and former player

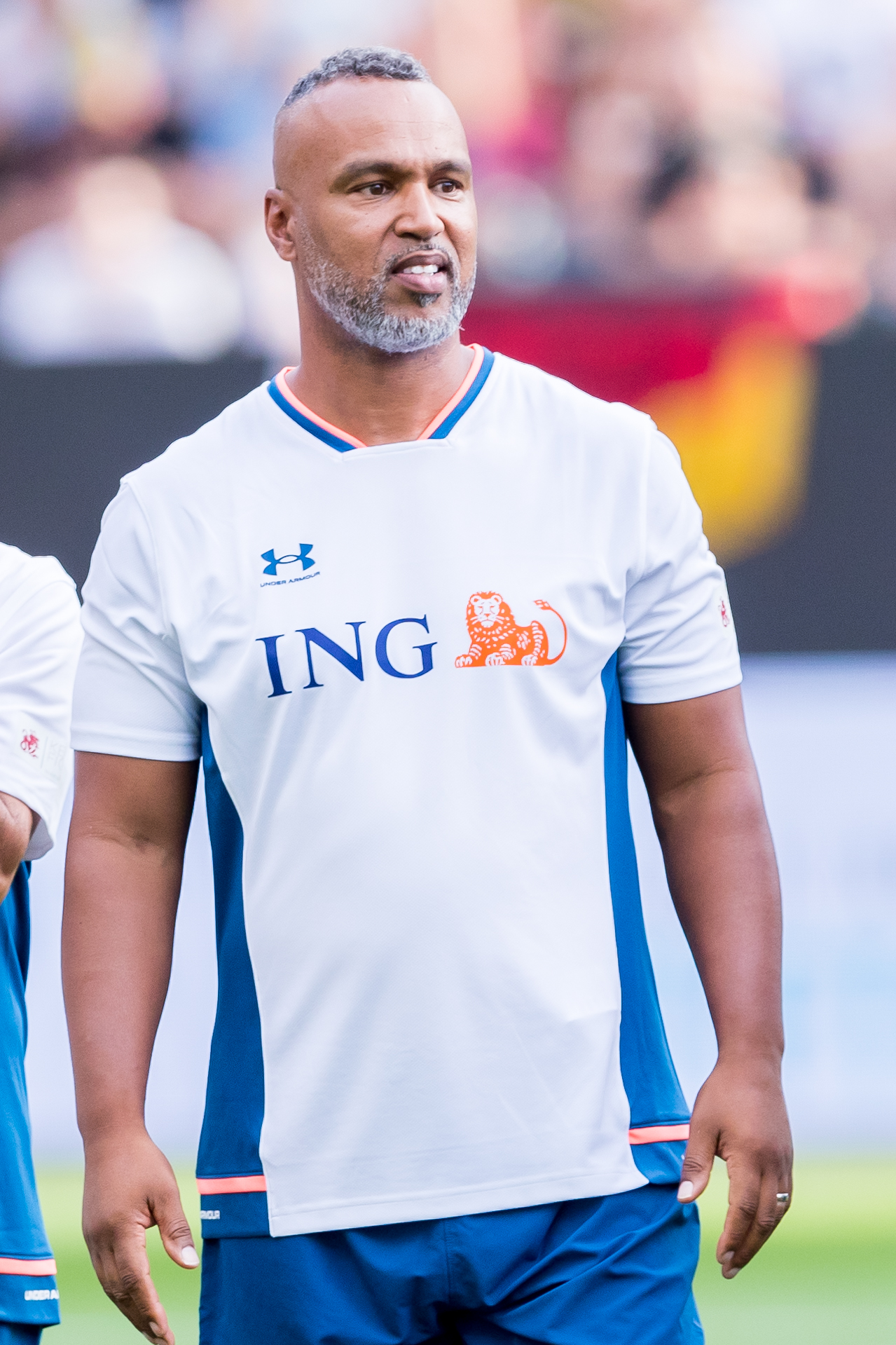
Esume in 2022

Patrick Esume (/e:'su:mə/) - born 3 February 1974, in Hamburg, West Germany) is a German American football coach, commentator, TV announcer, and former player. He is the Commissioner of the European League of Football which started play in 2021.

== Career ==
=== As a player ===
Esume started playing for the Hamburg Silver Eagles in 1992, staying with the team until its dissolution in 1995, when he switched to the Hamburg Blue Devils reaching the German Bowl thrice during his time there (winning once), and winning the Eurobowl three times. He ended his playing career after the 2000 season and subsequently became a coach.

=== As a coach ===
Esume worked as a so-called National Coach (a coach from the host nations of the mostly US-staffed and coached teams) of NFL Europe beginning in 2002, starting with the Frankfurt Galaxy, which won the World Bowl in the subsequent 2003 season. In 2005 he switched to the Hamburg Sea Devils, working as a running backs coach and special teams coordinator. Having won two NFL Minority Coaching Fellowships for the 2006 and 2007 seasons, Esume worked with the Oakland Raiders and the Cleveland Browns during their respective training camps. Esume's team, the Hamburg Sea Devils, also won the last-ever World Bowl in 2007.

Following the dissolution of NFL Europe, Esume switched to the Ligue Élite de Football Américain team La Courneuve Flash, leading them to a French championship in 2009 as head coach. Going back to Germany after one season in France, he became head coach of the Kiel Baltic Hurricanes of the German Football League and led them to win the 2010 edition of the German Bowl. He left his position in Kiel after the 2014 season and became head coach of the French national American football team later that year, leading them to a gold medal at the 2017 World Games and the 2018 European Championship of American Football triumph.

=== TV career ===
Since the 2015 NFL season, Esume has been working for de:ran Football as an analyst and commentator for the German broadcasts of NFL games on ProSiebenSat.1 Media, one of Germany's largest private broadcasting companies.

=== Other ventures ===
In November 2020, Esume announced the founding of a new professional American football league based in Europe called the European League of Football, which started play in 2021. Esume took on the role of commissioner, with a TV deal with ProSiebenSat.1 Media providing financial backing and potential public interest.

== Private life ==
Esume is married and has two children.
