= John Shoop =

American football player and coach (born 1969)

Nordic Storm
- Title: Head coach

Personal information
- Born: August 1, 1969 (age 57); Pittsburgh, Pennsylvania, U.S.

Career information
- Position: Quarterback
- College: Sewanee
- NFL draft: 1991: undrafted

Career history
- Dartmouth (1991) Quarterbacks; Vanderbilt (1992–1994) Graduate assistant; Carolina Panthers (1995–1998); Offensive quality control (1995–1996); Quarterbacks coach (1997–1998); Chicago Bears (1999–2003); Quarterbacks coach (1999–2000); Offensive coordinator (2001–2003); Tampa Bay Buccaneers (2004) Quarterbacks coach; Oakland Raiders (2005–2006); Quarterbacks coach (2005); Offensive coordinator & tight ends coach (2006); North Carolina (2007–2011) Offensive coordinator & quarterbacks coach; Purdue (2013–2015) Offensive coordinator & quarterbacks coach; Hamburg Sea Devils (2022) Offensive quality control; Munich Ravens (2023) Head coach; Rhein Fire (2024) Quarterbacks coach; Nordic Storm (2025–present) Head coach

Head coaching record
- Regular season: 7–5 (.583)
- Postseason: 0–0 (–)
- Career: 7–5 (.583)

John Shoop (born August 1, 1969) is an American football coach and former quarterback who is the current head coach of the Nordic Storm in the European League of Football (ELF). He played college football at Sewanee. He has coached in the National Football League (NFL) and at the collegiate level.

== Early life ==
Growing up in Oakmont, Pennsylvania, Shoop played quarterback in high school, and continued his football career at Sewanee: The University of the South. Shoop was a member of the Tigers football team from 1987 to 1990, starting from 1988 to 1990. As a senior captain in 1990, Shoop lead the Tigers to a Collegiate Athletic Conference title.

== Coaching career ==
=== Early career ===
Shoop began his coaching career as a volunteer quarterbacks coach at Dartmouth College in 1991. He served as a graduate assistant at Vanderbilt University from 1992 to 1994, where he earned a Master of Education degree from Vanderbilt's Peabody School of Education.

=== Carolina Panthers ===
Shoop spent four seasons with the Carolina Panthers, where he began his NFL coaching career at the age of 25. Shoop was an offensive quality control assistant for the Panthers from 1995 to 1996. He served as quarterbacks coach for Carolina from 1997 to 1998.

=== Chicago Bears ===
Shoop worked five seasons (1999–2003) for the Chicago Bears under head coach Dick Jauron. He served as the quarterbacks coach in 1999 and 2000. He was named offensive coordinator for the last four games of the 2000 season following incumbent Gary Crowton's departure for the head coaching position at Brigham Young University. Shoop then spent the next three seasons as the offensive coordinator (2001–2003).

James "Big Cat" Williams, the Bears Pro Bowl offensive lineman, nicknamed the offense "The Run and Shoop" during Shoop's tenure as offensive coordinator.

=== Tampa Bay Buccaneers ===
Shoop was quarterbacks coach for the Tampa Bay Buccaneers in 2004 under head coach Jon Gruden.

=== Oakland Raiders ===
Shoop then coached for the Oakland Raiders where he served as quarterbacks coach in 2005, the tight ends coach in 2006, and as offensive coordinator for the final five games of the 2006 season.

=== North Carolina ===
In January 2007, Shoop left the Raiders to become the offensive coordinator of the North Carolina Tar Heels football team.

=== Purdue ===
On January 24, 2013, Purdue University head football coach, Darrell Hazell hired Shoop to be the offensive coordinator and quarterbacks coach for the Boilermakers football team after taking a year off from coaching. Purdue's offense struggled in 2013 as Purdue was shut out in back-to-back games for the first time in 60 years and averaged less than 70 yards rushing and 285 yards of total offense per game over the course of the season. After two more seasons of similar struggles, Shoop was fired after the 2015 season.

== Statistics ==
Team offensive statistics where Shoop was offensive coordinator.

		Total Offense	Passing Offense	Rushing Offense	Ref
2001	Chicago Bears	26th	24th	17th	
2002	Chicago Bears	29th	24th	32nd	
2003	Chicago Bears	28th	30th	18th	
2006	Oakland Raiders	32nd	31st	29th	
2007	North Carolina	105th	64th	108th	
2008	North Carolina	84th	70th	84th	
2009	North Carolina	99th	99th	76th	
2010	North Carolina	46th	22nd	89th	
2011	North Carolina	49th	37th	75th	
2013	Purdue	122nd	87th	125th	
2014	Purdue	114th	105th	84th	
2015	Purdue	101st	67th	114th	

== Personal life ==
Shoop is an advocate for players' rights in college athletics. His dismissal from Purdue and his subsequent absence from coaching in college football have also been attributed to conflicts with athletic department administrators over player eligibility, concussion education and his support of a player unionization attempt at Northwestern and name, image and likeness (NIL) rights. His older brother Bob Shoop is also a football coach. Shoop lives with his wife Marcia in Asheville, North Carolina. He made a recovery from prostate cancer but was later diagnosed with Langerhans cell histiocytosis.
