= Markus Kuhn (American football) =

German-born American football defensive tackle

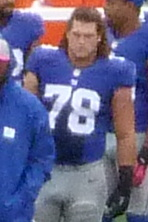
- Kuhn with the New York Giants in 2012

No. 78
- Position: Defensive tackle

Personal information
- Born: 5 May 1986 (age 40); Mannheim, West Germany
- Listed height: 6 ft 4 in (1.93 m)
- Listed weight: 303 lb (137 kg)

Career information
- High school: Weinheim (GER)
- College: North Carolina State
- NFL draft: 2012: 7th round, 239th overall pick

Career history
- New York Giants (2012–2015); New England Patriots (2016)*
- * Offseason or practice squad member only

Career NFL statistics
- Total tackles: 48
- Sacks: 1.5
- Fumble recoveries: 2
- Defensive touchdowns: 1
- Stats at Pro Football Reference

Markus Kuhn (born 5 May 1986) is a German former professional American football defensive tackle. He was selected by the New York Giants in the seventh round of the 2012 NFL draft. Kuhn played college football at NC State.

Kuhn played for the Giants for four seasons, where he earned the distinction of becoming the first German to earn an NFL touchdown after recovering a fumble in 2014. After leaving the Giants after the 2015 season, he had an offseason stint with the New England Patriots in 2016.

He is league president of the European Football Alliance (EFA) since August 2026. In addition he works as NFL analyst for RTL Germany.

== Early life ==
Born in Mannheim, Germany, Kuhn started playing football at age 14. He was introduced to the sport while spending vacations with his family in Florida. His interest and curiosity led him to start playing football in Germany and he eventually began playing linebacker and defensive tackle for the Weinheim Longhorns, winning Rookie of The Year. Kuhn was a four-time German Football League All-Star.

== College career ==
In 2007 Kuhn decided to play collegiate football. Without access to college recruiters, Kuhn resorted to personally visiting colleges with his father in 2007. He was ultimately given a scholarship at North Carolina State University. At NC State, Kuhn was part of the Champs Sports Bowl-winning team in 2010 and the Belk Bowl-winning team in 2011. In 2012 Kuhn earned a degree in business economics.

== Professional career ==
=== New York Giants ===
==== 2012 season ====
Kuhn was selected in the seventh round of the 2012 NFL draft by the New York Giants.

On August 31, 2012, it was announced that Kuhn had made the final roster. He made his debut in the season's inaugural game with a tackle assist, a feat he matched in the subsequent games. He started his first game in Week 6 against Cleveland Browns. During the game against the Cincinnati Bengals in week 10, Kuhn suffered a torn ACL and missed the rest of the 2012 season. The Giants finished the season 9-7 and out of the playoffs.

==== 2013 season ====
Almost one year after his ACL tear, Kuhn returned to practicing with his team. Because of his strong work ethic, the coaches named Kuhn on November 6 to the Giants active roster. Kuhn had his season debut in Week 13 against the Washington Redskins, a game the Giants won. In week 14, defensive tackle Kuhn returned a kickoff 13 yards, after the San Diego Chargers deliberately bounced a short kick, after a score with 19 seconds remaining in the first half. Kuhn and the Giants ended the season 7-9, failing to make the playoffs.

==== 2014 season ====
During the offseason, it was published that Kuhn has a good friendship with former Giant and 2014 Hall of Famer Michael Strahan. Kuhn was born in Mannheim and Strahan experienced the game of football in this city for the first time at the Mannheim Redskins (now the Rhein Neckar Bandits). In Week one, the Giants lost against the Detroit Lions. Kuhn missed the game because of an injury.

In week 14, on December 7, 2014, Kuhn returned a fumble 26 yards for a touchdown against the Titans. It was the Giants first non-offensive TD of the season. It was also the first ever touchdown scored by a German national in the NFL.

==== 2015 season ====
Ahead of the 2015 season it was announced that the 2015 NFL season would see a new broadcasting arrangement in Germany with (at least) two games every Sunday being broadcast live in free-to-air Television on ProSieben Maxx as well as on a free live stream on ran.de. Kuhn became a columnist for the website of ran.de, describing his day-to-day life in the NFL and how he sees his games. On the field the 2015 season saw him secure the ball one more time for his team, when he returned a fumble by Tom Brady against the New England Patriots, a game that the Giants ultimately lost on a late field goal. On December 25, 2015, Kuhn was placed on injured reserve due to a knee injury he suffered against the Miami Dolphins on December 14, 2015.

=== New England Patriots ===
On April 7, 2016, Kuhn signed with the New England Patriots. On September 3, 2016, he was released by the Patriots as part of final roster cuts.

=== Retirement ===
On January 27, 2017, Kuhn announced his retirement, never having played in a regular season game since being injured on December 14, 2015.
