= Gladsaxe Stadium =

Football stadium in Gladsaxe, Denmark

Coordinates: 55.7328°N 12.4967°E

- Gladsaxe Stadion
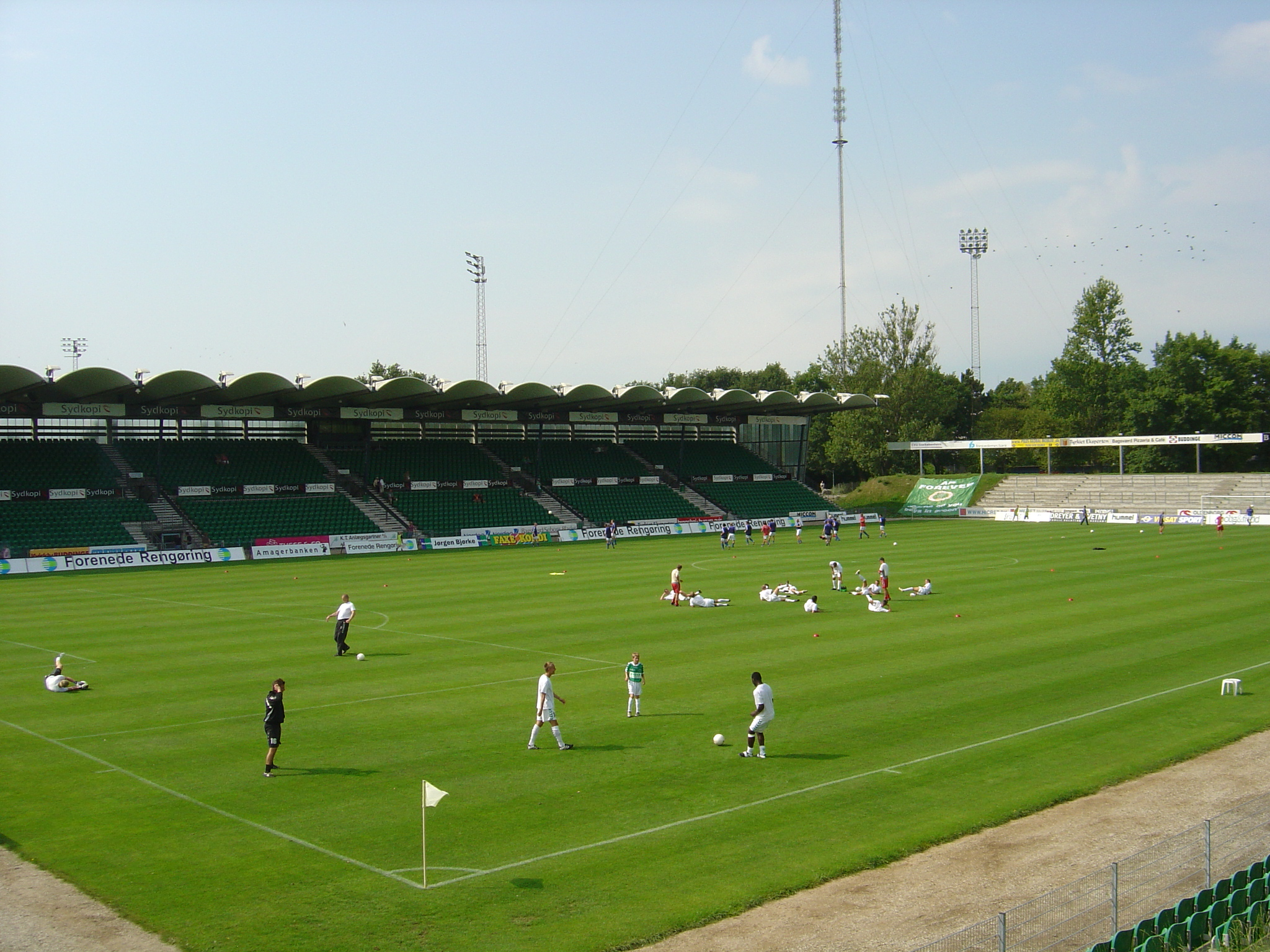
- Gladsaxe Stadium before a Danish 1st Division match between AB and Fremad Amager in 2005
- Interactive map of Gladsaxe Stadium
- Former names: Gladsaxe Idrætspark Marielyst
- Address: Gladsaxevej 200; Søborg; Denmark
- Location: Gladsaxe Municipality
- Owner: Gladsaxe Municipality
- Operator: Gladsaxe Municipality
- Capacity: 13,507
- Surface: Grass
- Record attendance: 10,754 (AB vs Brøndby, 27 October 2026)
- Field size: 105 by 68 metres
- Current use: Football, American football
- Public transit: Kildebakke railway station

Construction
- Built: 1938–1940
- Opened: 26 May 1940
- Renovated: 1998–1999

Tenants
- AB; Gladsaxe-Hero Boldklub; Nordic Storm

Gladsaxe Stadium (Danish: Gladsaxe Stadion) is a football stadium at Gladsaxevej 200 in Søborg, Gladsaxe Municipality, north-west of central Copenhagen. It is owned by Gladsaxe Municipality and has a capacity of 13,507, of which 7,707 are seats. The main pitch measures 105 by 68 metres and the wider complex includes nine training pitches used for football, handball and softball.

The ground opened on 26 May 1940 as Gladsaxe Idrætspark Marielyst. It was rebuilt between 1998 and 1999, when a new two-tier main stand was added along one touchline, and it was reopened under its present name on 12 September 1999. The opposite touchline dates from the 1960s and both ends are uncovered terracing.

Gladsaxe Stadium is the home ground of AB and Gladsaxe-Hero Boldklub. Since 2025 it has also hosted the American football team Nordic Storm. The record attendance of 10,754 was set on 27 October 2026, when AB lost 2–1 to Brøndby in the Danish Cup.

== History ==
Work on the complex began in 1938 under the name Gladsaxe Idrætspark Marielyst. The facility was inaugurated on 26 May 1940.

The most recent full redevelopment began on 16 November 1998. It covered the construction of a new stand along one touchline with both an upper and a lower tier, together with a sponsors' lounge. The ground was reopened under the name Gladsaxe Stadion on 12 September 1999.

The stand on the opposite touchline dates from the 1960s. The two end stands consist entirely of uncovered terracing. Spectators sit and stand close to the pitch, and much of the ground is closed for ordinary league fixtures.

AB won promotion to the Danish 1st Division, the second tier of Danish football, for the 2026–27 season. The Divisionsforeningen requires clubs at that level to have undersoil heating and floodlighting that meets set standards for light intensity and angle, neither of which Gladsaxe Stadium had.

The budget agreement for 2027 to 2030, signed by eight parties on 16 September 2026, allocated 20 million Danish kroner for a hybrid pitch with undersoil heating. A hybrid pitch combines natural grass with a small proportion of synthetic fibres, which retains the playing characteristics of grass while making the surface far more durable. Undersoil heating allows the pitch to be kept frost-free through the winter. The municipality expected the new pitch to come into use in mid-2027. Annual running and maintenance costs were put at 1.044 million kroner against an existing budget of 600,000 kroner.

The same agreement allocated a further 10 million kroner in 2027 for a complete replacement of the floodlighting. The municipality found that the existing masts were worn out, could not carry modern fittings and were poorly positioned for lighting the pitch, and that the lamps were no longer in production. The existing foundations could not take new masts. The scheme covers four new concrete foundations together with new galvanised masts, fittings, control panels and cabling.

The municipality noted that the main pitch was not used by grassroots clubs and was used only to a limited extent for other activities. It expected the more durable surface to widen access for local clubs and other events.

== Tenants ==
AB has played at the ground since it opened. The club spent eight seasons in the Danish Superliga between 1996 and 2004, over which it averaged 3,092 spectators across 132 home matches. The highest seasonal average was 4,618 in the 1999–2000 season and the lowest single attendance was 585.

Gladsaxe-Hero Boldklub also uses the ground. For many years the main pitch could not be used by other clubs within seven days of an AB home match, which the municipality's user board raised as a restriction on local football.

== Other uses ==
=== American football ===
Nordic Storm was announced on 21 September 2024 as the eighteenth franchise of the European League of Football. The club confirmed Gladsaxe Stadium as its home ground in December 2024. The team won the North Division in the 2025 season and beat Rhein Fire 28–23 at Gladsaxe Stadium in the wildcard round. Home attendances that season included 2,700 against Berlin Thunder and 1,937 against Frankfurt Galaxy.

=== Rugby league ===
The ground has staged rugby league internationals for the Denmark national rugby league team.

== Attendances ==
A record crowd of 10,754 watched AB play Brøndby in the Danish Cup on 27 October 2026

The record attendance was set on 27 October 2026, when 10,754 spectators watched AB lose 2–1 to Brøndby in the fourth round of the Danish Cup. Brøndby took 5,770 supporters to the match. Filip Bundgaard and Oskar Fenger scored for the visitors and Søren Ilsøe replied for AB.

The previous record had stood for more than 22 years. It was set on 18 April 2004, when 10,039 spectators watched a Superliga match between AB and FC Copenhagen.

== Transport ==
The nearest railway station is Kildebakke. Several bus routes serve Gladsaxevej.
