= Sportdigital =

German sports-oriented television channel

- Country: Germany
- Broadcast area: Germany, Austria, Switzerland, Liechtenstein
- Headquarters: Hamburg, Germany

Programming
- Language: German
- Picture format: 576i (16:9 SDTV); 1080i (16:9 HDTV)

Ownership
- Owner: Sportainment Media Group
- Sister channels: Sportdigital Edge; Sportdigital Fussball; Sportdigital Fussball 2 Sportdigital 1+ eSports One

History
- Launched: Spring 2008

Links
- Website: start.sportdigital.de

Availability

Streaming media
- Magine TV (Germany): -

Sportdigital is a sports-oriented television channel in Germany. The channel broadcasts on various cable and satellite packages including Sky Deutschland and broadcasts uninterrupted sports coverage daily.

Coverage includes KHL Hockey, Brazilian Championship, Argentine Primera División, Scottish Premiership, Australian A-League, and numerous other sports.
