= European Football Alliance =

Professional American football league in Europe

- Most recent season or competition: 2026 European Football Alliance season
- Sport: American football
- Founded: 5 July 2025; 16 months ago
- First season: 2026
- CEO: Eric Reutemann
- President: Markus Kuhn
- No. of teams: 7 (2027)
- Countries: Austria, Czech Republic, Denmark, France, Germany, United Kingdom
- Headquarters: Frankfurt, Germany
- Continent: Europe
- Most recent champion: (Denmark) Nordic Storm (2026)
- Broadcasters: Sportdigital+ (Germany, Austria, Switzerland); FuboTV (Canada, USA); Hessischer Rundfunk and Bayerischer Rundfunk (Germany); Sporty TV (Czech Republic); Molotov TV (France); Verdens Gang (Norway)
- Streaming partner: YouTube
- Website: efafootball.com

The European Football Alliance, commonly abbreviated as EFA, is a professional American football league based in Europe. Its inaugural season began on May 15, 2026. Teams are located in Austria, the Czech Republic, Denmark, France, Germany, with an expansion team in the United Kingdom in 2027.

== History ==
=== Background ===
The European Football Alliance emerged from the ELF Franchise Association. This group had been founded in early 2024 as an alliance of several teams from the European League of Football (ELF). The ELF, founded in 2021 by TV expert Patrick Esume and sports executive Zeljko Karajica, began competition with eight teams and expanded to 17 teams by 2024. The league was centrally managed by ELF GmbH, which was majority-controlled by CEO Karajica.

After the 2024 season, the team alliance, operating under the name Football Franchise Association (FFA) called for greater financial transparency and equal treatment of all franchises. It criticized, among other things, that certain teams were directly or indirectly owned by Karajica. According to the FFA, the planned creation of a franchise in Amsterdam also failed because of the league’s lack of transparency.

=== Founding ===
In July 2025, the FFA reorganized itself as the European Football Alliance with eight initial members. The EFA renewed its criticism of the ELF’s financial and organizational structure and raised concerns about the sporting competitiveness of certain franchises, particularly those closely linked to league management. It called for structural reforms and suggested the creation of an alternative league. As a result, the sporting leadership of the ELF, including Commissioner Patrick Esume, resigned, citing “irreconcilable differences regarding the leadership and financial structure of the ELF with managing director Zeljko Karajica.”

On 9 September 2025, two days after the ELF Championship Game 2025, the eleven EFA members announced they would leave the ELF and compete in a new league starting in 2026. The new league was intended to follow the ownership model of the NFL, with club owners controlling league governance.

Ten franchises confirmed on 6 October 2025, that their contracts with the ELF had expired or been terminated and that they would join the EFA in 2026. Only Raiders Tirol was reportedly still contractually tied to the ELF for 2026.

However, internal disagreements soon emerged over the future structure of the competition. Some member clubs supported a team-controlled league model and remained within the EFA framework for the 2026 season. Others favored the creation of a separate competition backed by an external investor and broke away from the EFA. This rival league, the American Football League Europe, was publicly presented on 2 December 2025.

In November 2025, the EFA admitted new members from London and Milan. Between late November 2025 and mid-January 2026, the EFA and ELF GmbH held further talks regarding cooperation. The EFA ended negotiations on 15 January 2026, stating that ELF GmbH had failed to secure financial stability.

The EFA then returned to its original plan of launching an independent league, joined on 3 February 2026, by the Munich Ravens as the seventh team. In contrast, the Madrid Bravos announced their withdrawal from competition on 10 March 2026.

=== 2026 season ===
EFA Championship Trophy 2026

On 10 March 2026, the league released its 2026 schedule. The inaugural season began on May 15, 2026, with the Friday Night Kickoff Game at PSD Bank Arena in Frankfurt am Main. The same stadium hosted the semi finals on 15 and 16 August 2026, named BIG4. The season concluded with the first EFA Championship Game on 29 August 2026.

The regular season was dominated by the Munich Ravens and the Nordic Storm, both of which lost only one game each. The remaining two playoff spots were not decided until the final game day, with Frankfurt and Paris coming out on top. Munich and Nordic qualified for the first EFA Championship Game, which Storm won with a decisive 48–28 victory.

The day before the 2026 Championship Game former NFL player Markus Kuhn was appointed as EFA president.

On 11 August 2026, London Guard was confirmed as 2027 expansion team.

== Teams ==
European Football Alliance (Europe)
European Football Alliance teams.
- 2026 teams
- 2027 expansion team

The EFA began its inaugural 2026 season with six former ELF teams. The Madrid Bravos were originally slated to join the league, but withdrew shortly before the schedule was announced. The season culminated in the first ever EFA Championship Game, where the Nordic Storm became champions after beating the Munich Ravens 48–28. During this time, the London Guard were announced as the league's seventh team scheduled to join in 2027. However, in November 2026, the Storm announced their intentions to join a different league, that being the AFLE, bringing the EFA back down to six teams.

Since November 2025, franchises from London and Milan have been members of the EFA. These teams were initially expected to begin competition in the 2027 season, however no expansion team from Milan has since surfaced.

The following teams are member of the European Football Alliance:

Franchise	City	ELF since	Stadium
2027 teams
Frankfurt Galaxy	(Germany) Frankfurt	2021	PSD Bank Arena
Munich Ravens	(Germany) Munich	2023	Uhlsport Park, Unterhaching
Paris Musketeers	(France) Paris	2023	Stade Bauer, Saint-Ouen-sur-Seine; Stade Robert Bobin, Bondoufle
Prague Lions	(Czech Republic) Prague	2023	FK Viktoria Stadion
Raiders Tirol	(Austria) Innsbruck	2022	Tivoli Stadion Tirol
London Guard	(United Kingdom) London	–	Brisbane Road

=== Former teams ===
Former teams in the European Football Alliance
Team	City	Joined	Final season	Fate
Berlin Thunder	(Germany) Berlin	2025	2025	Withdrew in October 2025, joined the AFLE
Rhein Fire	(Germany) Duisburg	2025	2025	Withdrew in October 2025, joined the AFLE
Panthers Wrocław	(Poland) Wrocław	2025	2025	Withdrew in October 2025, joined the AFLE
Vienna Vikings	(Austria) Vienna	2025	2025	Withdrew in October 2025, joined the AFLE
Stuttgart Surge	(Germany) Stuttgart	2025	2025	Club declared bankruptcy
Madrid Bravos	(Spain) Madrid	2025	2025	Dropped out in March 2026
Nordic Storm	(Denmark) Copenhagen	2025	2026	Withdrew in November 2026, joined the AFLE

== People and organizational structure ==
The European Football Alliance is governed by its Board of Governors, in which the participating teams are represented. Markus Kuhn is the league president since 2026. The Chief Executive Officer (CEO) is Eric Reutemann, who also holds the same position with Frankfurt Galaxy. The EFA also employs content creators such as former quarterback Jan Weinreich. Head of Officiating is Frank Kristensen.

The league is operated by the EFA Football Services GmbH, based in Frankfurt. Fifty percent of the company is owned by the participating teams or affiliated individuals. Twenty-five percent of EFA GmbH is owned by the European Football Alliance e.V., whose members are the participating teams. The remaining 25 percent is owned by KC Stable LLC and the Gandler Sports Group.

== Rules ==
The EFA follows the framework of the National Football League (NFL) rules. A notable exception are the overtime rules, where it uses the NCAA's college football rules. Unlike most European sports leagues, (including European American football leagues) there cannot be a tie. The head of officiating is Frank Kristensen.

=== Rosters ===
Each team has a 65-player roster and up to 12 players on a practice squad. The game-day roster is restricted to 48 players, with two additional spots for players under 21 years of age. The league has a salary cap for all franchises.

Unlike the NFL Europe, whose team rosters consisted mostly of American players, EFA focuses on developing European talent in American Football. Each team is allowed to have four A imports on the gameday roster–that is players from the United States, Canada, Mexico, or Japan–with two on the field at the same time. Additionally, six E import players from Europe or the rest of the world can be signed to the game day roster. The rest of the roster is reserved for homegrown players. Some teams have homegrown territories that extend beyond their own country:

- Raiders Tirol: Austria, Switzerland, Italy,
- Prague Lions: Czech Republic, Slovakia, Poland,
- Nordic Storm: Denmark, Sweden,
- Paris Musketeers: France,
- Frankfurt Galaxy and Munich Ravens: Germany.

=== Season structure ===
The European Football Alliance season is divided into the regular season and the playoffs (postseason). In the 2026 regular season, each team played every other team twice. The top four teams qualify for the semifinals, which—like the final—are decided in a single game. The period between seasons is referred to as the offseason.

== Broadcasting and media coverage ==
The games are available free of charge on the YouTube platform. Games involving German teams will be streamed by Hessischer Rundfunk and Bayerischer Rundfunk via their online platforms. In German-speaking countries, selected games will also be broadcast on Sportdigital+. Additional international broadcast partners include Sporty TV in the Czech Republic, Molotov TV in France, Verdens Gang in Norway and FuboTV in the United States and Canada.
