= Paris Musketeers =

Professional American football team in France

- Current season
- Logo
- Uniforms

General information
- Founded: September 23, 2022
- Headquartered: Paris, France
- Colors: Navy blue, red, gray, white
- Mascot: Musky (musketeer)

Personnel
- Owner: John McKeon
- CEO: Jason Johnson; Patrick Butler
- Head coach: Jack Del Rio

Team history
- Paris Musketeers (2023–present)

Home fields
- Stade Jean Bouin (2023–2024); Stade Robert Bobin (2025–present); Stade Bauer (2026-present)

League / conference affiliations
- European League of Football (2023–2025): Western Conference (2023–2024); West Division (2025); European Football Alliance (2026–present)

Playoff appearances (1)
- 2024 (ELF)

The Paris Musketeers are an American football team in Paris, France, that plays in the European Football Alliance (EFA). From 2023 to 2025 they played in the European League of Football (ELF).

== History ==
=== European League of Football (2022–2025) ===
The Paris franchise was announced on 23 September 2022 via a press statement, together with the Prague Lions for the 2023 European League of Football expansion. The team is owned and operated by the capital group named Les Mousquetaires de Paris and is based in Rosny-sous-Bois, east of Paris. The team name Saints, logo and colors of the franchise were unveiled on 23 January 2023. At that point they were temporarily known as the Paris Football Team. On 27 February 2023, the organization announced, that the official name would be the Musketeers.

The first head coach of the franchise was former Vanderbilt Commodores' defensive secondary coach Marc Mattioli.

On 20 November 2022, a recruitment camp was held with around 240 French and international players in attendance. French nationals Mamadou Sy and Mamadou Doumbouya, were selected for the team, with both having their origins from the national league champion La Courneuve Flash. Further building blocks of the roster consists of the first ever franchise quarterback Zach Edwards, coming from the Barcelona Dragons.

On 7 September 2024, the team made its first post-season appearance which resulted in a loss against the Vienna Vikings. Mattoli left the team to become the defensive coordinator for Kennesaw State, an American college football team following the 2024 season. Former NFL head coach, Jack Del Rio, was hired on 17 January 2025, as the next head coach of the team.

=== European Football Alliance (2026–present) ===
Following the 2025 ELF season, the eleven member franchises of the European Football Alliance confirmed that they would leaving the European League of Football to start a new competition in 2026, with the Paris Musketeers among the teams confirmed for the new league. The Musketeers would compete in the first-ever game in EFA history, defeating the Frankfurt Galaxy 21-20. Paris would qualify for the BIG4 playoffs despite a 4-6 record, losing in the semifinals to the Munich Ravens 52-33.

=== Season-by-season results ===
Season	Head coach	Regular season					Postseason				Result
Season	Head coach	GP	Won	Lost	Win %	Finish	GP	Won	Lost	Win %	Result
2023	Marc Mattioli	12	6	6	.500	3rd (Western Conference)	DNQ				
2024	Marc Mattioli	12	10	2	.833	2nd (Western Conference)	1	0	1	.000	L Semifinals vs. Vienna
2025	Jack Del Rio	12	7	5	.583	2nd (West Division)	DNQ				
2026	Jack Del Rio	10	4	6	.400	4th	1	0	1	.000	L Semifinals vs. Nordic
Total		46	27	19	.587	-	2	0	2	.000	

== Stadium ==
The Musketeers held their tryout at the Paris La Défense Arena with a capacity of 30,680 seats. On 13 March 2023, the franchise announced the Stade Jean Bouin in the 16th arrondissement of Paris as their home field for the 2023 season. On 29 April 2025, the Musketeers announced their move to Stade Robert Bobin in Bondoufle as their home stadium for the 2025 season.

== Roster ==
Paris Musketeers roster
Quarterbacks: 8 (United States) Jaylon Henderson QB; Running backs: 28 (France) Jason Bofunda; 7 (France) Nicolas Khandar; 21 (France) Jean-Charles Moukouri; Wide receivers: 11 (France) Jefferson Alexandre; 84 (France) Noa Badibanga; 5 (France) Rémi Bertellin; 18 (France) Stéphane Fortes; 13 (France) Florian Larose; 85 (France) Sirac Kougnaglo; 6 (United States) Austin Mitchell; 1 (France) Anthony Mahoungou; 14 (France) Cheikhou Sow; 88 (France) Martin Teham; 12 (France) Hugo Tekedam; Tight ends: 89 (France) Liam Ward	Offensive linemen: 70 (France) Nyohor Badiane G; 65 (Italy) Jeremy Gasparro C; 78 (France) Max Gaye T; 70 (Norway) Jonas Hagerup T; 62 (France) Julien Kouakou T; 50 (France) Nabil Marzougui C; 76 (France) Elton Mendes T; 73 (France) Elyes Saoui G; 63 (United Kingdom) Lewis Thomas G; 75 (France) Laïc Vontie T; Defensive linemen: 17 (France) Randy Abandzounou DE; 15 (United States) Artis DeMarco DE; 99 (France) Willem Dendele DT; 90 (France) Valentin Gnahoua DE; 45 (France) Jaurés Goké DE; 58 (Samoa) Lance Leota DT; 43 (Australia) Jack Loew DT; 97 (France) Averdié Mizius DT; 44 (France) Stanley Zeregbe DE; 95 (Sweden) Aslan Zetterberg DE	Linebackers: 4 (France) Digaan Gomis MLB; 31 (France) Kadel King MLB; 41 (France) Davidson Larochel OLB; 33 (Spain) Oliver Obolela; 35 (France) Paul Véritas; Defensive backs: 27 (France) Maeric Achiepi SS; 20 (France) Jordy Adjetey CB; 24 (France) Jean Aubert CB; 26 (France) Jean-Alphonse Edris; 2 (France) Souleymane Karamoko FS; 3 (France) Amir Kilani SS; 0 (United States) Jamalcolm Liggins CB; 10 (France) Widmael Petion CB; 29 (France) Kevin Querido SS; 36 (France) Maxime Roger CB; 20 (France) Wadjihe Said CB; Special teams: 30 (France) Mathys Dupont K	Reserve lists: 72 (France) Wally Camara G; -- (France) Yanis Polin RB; Practice squad: 74 (France) Olivier Bordin T; 34 (France) Noe Geremias ILB; 19 (France) Sofiane Khezami LB; 25 (France) Fara Mendy FS; 81 (France) Kevin Mwamba TE; 59 (France) Bruno Ribeiro G; 28 (France) Judson Saint Louis Saintervil RB; 55 Mamadou Sy DT; 23 (France) Chris Voumbo RB; Rookies in italics Roster updated July 24, 2025; 4 A-import, 5 E-import, 44 homegrown 53 active, 9 practice squad

== Staff ==
- Head coach/defensive coordinator – Jack Del Rio (United States)
- Offensive Coordinator – Vacant
- Co-offensive coordinator/offensive line – John Booker (United States)
- Pass game coordinator/quarterbacks/wide receivers – Maximilian Koessler (Austria)
- Special teams coordinator/running backs – Jimmie Johnson III (United States)
- Linebackers – Frank Blateri (United States)
- Defensive line – Matthew Beeler (United States)
- Tight ends – Artchill Monney (France)
- Defensive backs – Arnaud Vidaller (France)
- Assistant offensive line – Quentin Danès (France)
- Assistant linebackers – Corentin Mingam-Piguillem (France)

== Honors ==
=== Players ===
Honor	Player Name	Season
EFA Offensive Rookie of the Year	(France) Hassane Dosso	2026
EFA Homegrown Player of the Year	(France) Hugo Tekadam	2026

== See also ==
- Paris Lights, another professional American football team competing in the American Football League Europe
