= Essonne Stadium =

Sports stadium in Bondoufle, France

Coordinates: 48.622162°N 2.393018°E

Stade Robert Bobin
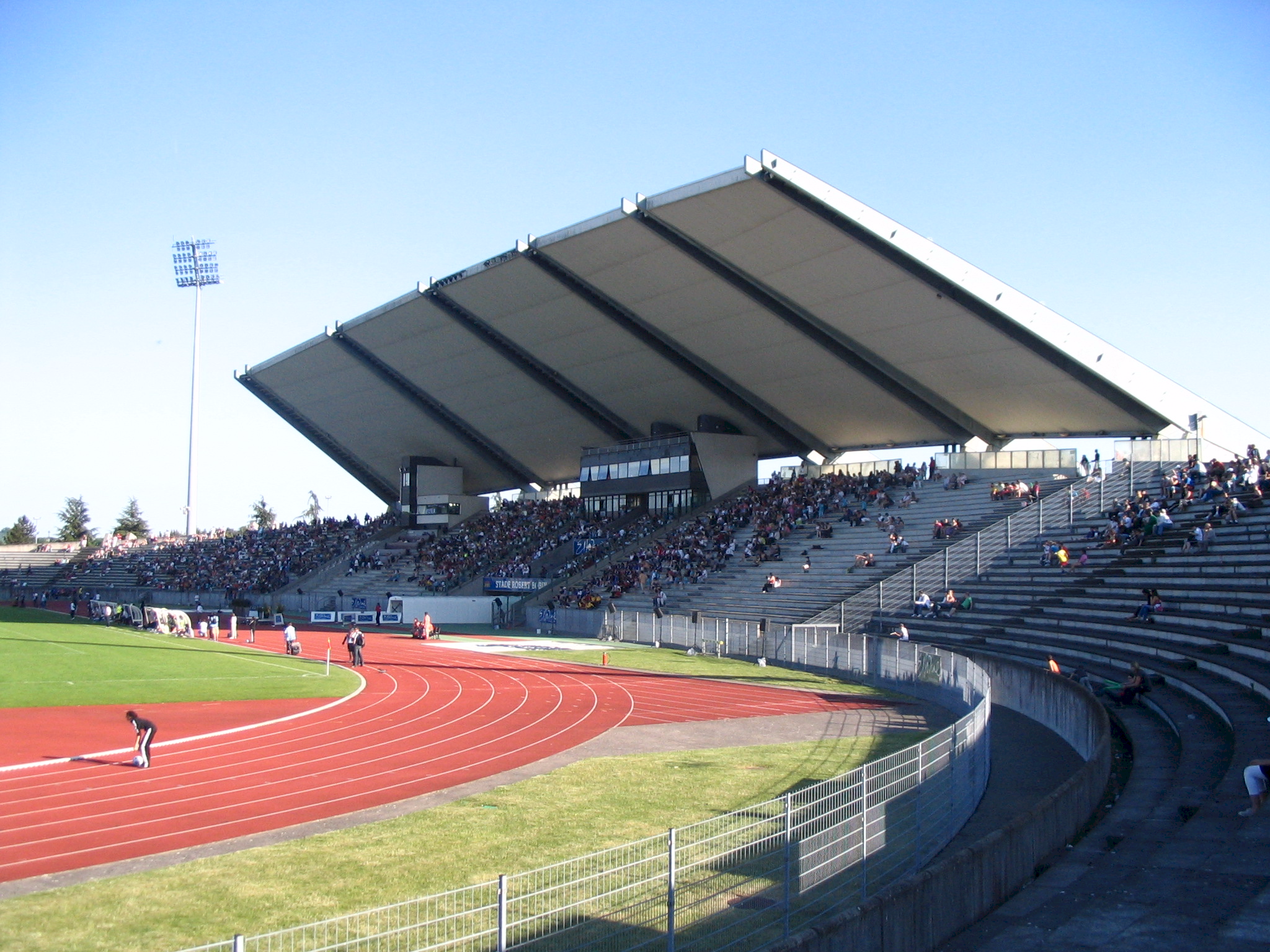
- Interactive map of Stade Robert Bobin
- Location: Bondoufle, Essonne, France
- Capacity: 18,850
- Surface: Grass

Construction
- Opened: 1994

Tenants
- Current: FC Fleury 91 (men) (2016–2020, 2025–present); FC Fleury 91 (women) (2023–present); Paris Musketeers (2025–present); Former: Paris FC (women)

Essonne Stadium, formerly known as the Stade Robert Bobin, is a multi-purpose stadium in Bondoufle, Essonne, France. It is the home ground of association football club FC Fleury 91's men's and women's teams, and of American football's Paris Musketeers.

The stadium hosted the 1996 French Athletics Championships. It holds 18,850 spectators.
