= European League of Football =

Professional American football league

- Most recent season or competition: 2025 European League of Football season
- Sport: American football
- Founded: 4 November 2020; 5 years ago
- First season: 2021
- Folded: 2025
- Replaced by: European Football Alliance; American Football League Europe
- Owners: SEH Sports & Entertainment Holding, Patrick Esume
- CEO: Željko Karajica
- Commissioner: Patrick Esume
- No. of teams: 16 (2025)
- Countries: 9 (2025)
- Headquarters: Hamburg, Germany
- Continent: Europe
- Last champion: Stuttgart Surge (1st title) (2025)
- Most titles: Rhein Fire (2 titles)
- Broadcaster: DAZN
- Website: europeanleague.football

The European League of Football (ELF) was a professional American football league based in Europe, continuing some team names of the former NFL Europe. The ELF played its first season in 2021 with eight teams, and had 16 teams in the final 2025 season. Teams were located in Austria, the Czech Republic, Denmark, France, Hungary, Italy, Germany, Poland, Spain, Switzerland, and Turkey.

After the 2025 season most teams left the league in order to establish a new league called European Football Alliance (EFA). Other teams moved to the newly founded American Football League Europe whilst others folded.

== History ==
The European League of Football was announced 4 November 2020 by Patrick Esume, former American Football coach and TV commentator, and sports manager Zeljko Karajica. Since 2018, Esume had criticized the American Football Association of Germany (AFVD) for not using the fan potential in Germany, and tried to set up a professionalized structure for American football in Germany and the rest of Europe.

The announcement of the league was met with skepticism from AFVD and the German Football League (GFL). AFVD president Robert Huber, said, "...we have experience over the last forty years in running leagues in Germany and in Europe and we have a pretty good insight into what the teams are capable of". However, Esume firmly believes that this league will succeed because "American football is experiencing a boom in Germany".

The first two new franchises to reveal their identity were the Ingolstadt Praetorians and Hanover-based team German Knights 1367, in early December 2020. They were followed by the Spanish team Gladiators Football, who also revealed they will play their games out of Costa Daurada, and will be coached by long-time CFL coach Adam Rita.

In March 2021, the league announced an agreement with the NFL to be able to use the names of former NFL Europe teams. On the same day, it was announced the franchises in Hamburg and Frankfurt would use the previous names of Hamburg Sea Devils and Frankfurt Galaxy. The Sea Devils also introduced their new head coach, Ted Daisher, former special teams coach for multiple NFL teams. It was then announced that the franchises in Ingolstadt and Hannover were not ready to launch in 2021; they were replaced with two new teams in Leipzig and Cologne. The franchises in Cologne, Berlin, and Barcelona would also take on the names from their NFL Europe counterparts.

=== 2021 season ===
Inaugural ELF teams

(Spain) Barcelona Dragons
(Germany) Berlin Thunder
(Germany) Cologne Centurions
(Germany) Frankfurt Galaxy
(Germany) Hamburg Sea Devils
(Germany) Leipzig Kings
(Poland) Panthers Wrocław
(Germany) Stuttgart Surge

On 19 June 2021 at 6 p.m. the first kickoff of the ELF took place in Wroclaw. The host Panthers defeated the Cologne Centurions 55–39. Frankfurt Galaxy won the South Division with only one defeat and defeated division rival Cologne Centurions in the semi-finals. The North Division was won by the Hamburg Sea Devils, who prevailed in the semi-finals against division opponent Panthers Wrocław. On September 26, 2021, the first final of the ELF took place before 22,000 in the Merkur Spiel-Arena in Düsseldorf. In a close game, Frankfurt Galaxy prevailed against Hamburg Sea Devils 32–30. A week later, an all-star game took place between the ELF all-stars and a selection of USA-based players.

In June 2021, the league announced a partnership agreement with the Brazilian Football Federation, Brasil Futebol Americano, that will see exchange opportunities for selected players, coaches and officials as well as the possibility of organizing a match between the ELF and BFA champions in the future.

In July 2021, the league announced its inaugural All-Star Game, which was held one week after the end of the season, on 3 October (German Unity Day), at Friedrich-Ludwig-Jahn-Sportpark in Berlin. It will feature a selection of the best players from the ELF, playing against the United States men's national American football team. Similar to the rules for rosters of individual teams, the all-star team was limited to a maximum of four Americans, only two of whom can be on the field at any given time.

=== 2022 season ===
In September 2021, the first indications of new teams for the second season became known. 12 to 16 teams were announced for the 2022 season. On 12 September 2021, the Vienna Vikings from the Austrian Football League announced their interest in joining the ELF in a press conference. The Austrian rival Raiders Tirol also confirmed entry into the league the day before the first ELF final. On the same day, Rhein Fire from Düsseldorf was presented, taking over another name from the NFL Europe. On 15 October 2021 the league welcomed the Istanbul Rams, finalising the field of twelve teams for the 2022 season was completed.

In the 2022 season, the two Austrian expansion teams, Vienna Vikings and Raiders Tirol, were immediately among the strongest teams in the league. The Vikings won the Central Conference with 10 victories and 2 defeats; the Raiders Tirol qualified with 8–4 as the best conference second for the play-offs. Surprisingly the Barcelona Dragons won the Southern Conference with 8–4. Hamburg Sea Devils were the best team of the regular season and won the Northern Conference. After a 39–12 in the semi-final against the Dragons, the Vienna Vikings also won the Championship Game 2022 against the Sea Devils with 27–15.

=== 2023 season ===
Three expansion teams for the 2023 season were already announced prior to the 2022 season: Milano Seamen from the Italian Football League, Hungarian team Fehérvár Enthroners from the Austrian Football League Division 1, and the newly founded Helvetic Guards. In addition, on 3 August 2022 Munich and in September 2022 Paris and Prague were introduced as new franchises. On 16 December 2022 the Istanbul Rams withdrew from the league. The 2023 season thus started with 17 teams from nine countries. During the regular season, Leipzig Kings had to withdraw on 10 July 2023.

On the first weekend of the 2023 season, Rhein Fire set a new attendance record for the regular season in the Germany derby against Frankfurt Galaxy with 12665 spectators. The record was broken in the second week by the Hamburg Sea Devils, who played a game for the first time in Volksparkstadion (capacity 57,000). 32,500 spectators came to the game against Rhein Fire. The regular season was dominated by Rhein Fire in the Western Conference and the Vienna Vikings in the Eastern Conference. Stuttgart Surge was able to secure the Central Conference under the new head coach Jordan Neuman. Frankfurt Galaxy, Panthers Wroclaw and, for the first time, Berlin Thunder, qualified for the playoffs. In the Wild Card Round, which was held for the first time, Frankfurt against Berlin and Stuttgart against Wroclaw used the home advantage. Rhein Fire also prevailed against Frankfurt Galaxy in the semi-finals in its own stadium. Opponent in the final was Stuttgart Surge, who were able to teach the Vienna Vikings the first home defeat in the ELF with the 40–33. Rhein Fire won the final.

=== 2024 season ===
In the run-up to the 2023 season, Madrid was announced as expansion city. Leipzig Kings dropped out during the 2023 season. Helvetic Guards were replaced by a new Swiss team in April 2024.

The Madrid Bravos made an excellent start into the ELF. In week 2 they beat the reigning champion Rhein Fire. However, after the loss Fire won all other games and topped the Western Conference. The other conferences were also won by the previous year's winners: The Vienna Vikings in the East without loss, and Stuttgart Surge in the Central Conference with one loss against the Raiders Tirol. The Raiders failed to qualify after losing at Munich Ravens in the last regular season game. In the wild card round, Paris and Munich faced each other. In a game with ten leadership changes, the Musketeers were finally able to prevail. In the other wild card game, Rhein Fire took revenge for losing to the Bravos in the regular season. In the semi-finals, Fire met Stuttgart Surge in the replay of last year's final. Surge looked like the winner for a long time, but Rhein Fire was able to equalize shortly before the end and finally prevail in extra time. The Vienna Vikings prevailed with 47-31 against Paris. The championship game was played in the Arena AufSchalke in Gelsenkirchen. In the game between the champions of the two previous seasons, Rhein Fire had the upper hand.

=== 2025 season ===
The Nordic Storm, representing Copenhagen in Denmark and Malmö in Sweden, joined the league for the 2025 season. The Barcelona Dragons folded, whereas the Milano Seamen are on hiatus. With QB Jadrian Clark and RB Glen Toonga, Nordic Storm signed two key players from champion Rhein Fire. Former Fire OC Andrew Weidinger joined Madrid Bravos as HC. Jack Del Rio joined the Paris Musketeers as HC. DJ Irons joined Wroclaw Panthers as their QB for the 2025 season as they struggled with QBs last year. The ELF struck a deal with DAZN to broadcast all their games with their Game Pass.

Stuttgart Surge achieved their first title ever after defeating Vienna Vikings 24–17 in the final.

=== 2026 season ===
At the end of the 2025 season, eleven teams — Berlin Thunder, Rhein Fire, Nordic Storm, Frankfurt Galaxy, Paris Musketeers, Stuttgart Surge, Madrid Bravos, Raiders Tirol, Panthers Wrocław, Prague Lions, and Vienna Vikings — left the ELF and established a new league called the European Football Alliance (EFA). The ELF later announced that they had eleven teams "under valid contract" for the 2026 season and were in "intensive discussions" with multiple prospective partners and "remains committed to open dialogue with all current franchises, with the clear goal of building a shared foundation for the further development of the league and of American football across Europe".

On 26 November 2025, the ELF and EFA announced that the two competitions would be reunifying with a number of administrative and commercial changes ahead of the 2026 season. However, on January 15, 2026, EFA terminated the cooperation agreement due to ELF missing financial stability and transparency. EFA will go forward with their initial plan to establish an independent league. In parallel, four teams split from the EFL to the newly created American Football League Europe.

In February 2026, the ELF announced that they were entering preliminary self-administration proceedings under German insolvency law. According to the ELF’s statement, this comes as a result of anticipated investor funding not materializing. All operations, including games, continue during this process. However, on 23 March 2026 insolvency proceedings were initiated against the European League of Football GmbH.

2025 ELF teams in 2026 season
European Football Alliance: Frankfurt Galaxy; Munich Ravens; Nordic Storm; Paris Musketeers; Prague Lions; Raiders Tirol	American Football League Europe: Berlin Thunder; Panthers Wrocław; Rhein Fire; Vienna Vikings	Austrian Football League: Fehérvár Enthroners	folded: Cologne Centurions; Hamburg Sea Devils; Helvetic Mercenaries; Madrid Bravos; Stuttgart Surge

== Goals ==
The ELF has said it hopes to bring back the excitement around American football that existed in the era of NFL Europe. Unlike NFL Europe, whose team rosters consisted of mostly American players, there will be restrictions to the number of international players allowed on rosters. There will be a bigger focus given to homegrown players, with the goal to develop the best of these players into NFL prospects. One way they plan on doing this is by creating an "ELF Academy". While ELF franchises will not have "youth teams", CEO Zeljko Karajica says that the academy will "...give players the opportunity to make the next step", which would be the skills to succeed in the ELF and compete for a spot on an NFL team.

== Rules ==
The ELF plays with modified NFL rules, except for overtime, where it uses the NCAA's college football rules. Unlike most European sports leagues, (including European American football leagues) a game that is still tied at the end of regulation during the regular season goes to overtime. However, no overtime was actually played in the inaugural 2021 season as all games had a winner after regulation. During the regular season of the inaugural 2021 season, the ELF did not have instant replay or other forms of replay review in gridiron football (such as the coach's challenge); however, this feature was introduced for the 2021 ELF Bowl as well as for the upcoming season.

On 30 November 2021, the official Twitter account of the European League of Football announced a new kickoff rule. The new rule sees the kicking team's players, except the kicker, line up on its opponent's 35-yard line, while the receiving team's players, except the returner, line up on their own 30-yard line. Both teams are only allowed to move when the ball has either been touched by the returner or three seconds after the ball has touched the ground. This rule is nearly identical to the kickoff rule used by the 2020 iteration of the XFL and later by the NFL. Only the requirement, that the ball must be kicked between the receiving team's 20-yard line and endzone, is, at this time, not a part of the rule. The main cited reason for the rule change is player safety.

=== Officiating ===
Officiating in the ELF is comparable to the NFL. Head of officiation since the first season in 2021 is former German Football League official Kurt Paulus. In this role, he is in charge of training and organizing the officiating crews for individual game days. Furthermore, the head of officiating and its deputies are consulting the commissioner and Competition Committee for rule changes and new rules.

Officiating crews consist of seven on-field officials who stay together for a season. During a game, they are connected via intercom and English-language on-field dialogue. In the 2022 season, the referees came from 16 different European countries. With the exception of the GFL and its governing body, referees officiating in the ELF are allowed to participate in national leagues during the ELF offseason. Officials in the ELF do not wear numbers on their jerseys.

== Salary ==
Rosters consist of a maximum of 53 players, plus another 12 on the practice squad as of 2023. Because homegrown players are one of the main focus points of the league, there are limitations on the number of foreigners. Each roster can only have a maximum of four U.S., Canadian, Mexican, or Japanese players (A-players), and a maximum of ten other foreign players for the 2021 season, which was then reduced to eight players for the 2022 season and six players for the 2023 season. However, the Bosman ruling prevents discrimination against EU citizens on EU-based sports teams and leagues. Brazilian players did not count towards the import quota due to the league's partnership with Liga BFA in the 2021 season.

The league has a salary cap for all franchises which is divided into three salary groups for its players. Up to eight players—including the four A-import spots—are paid a full-time salary. For American import players, a franchise can pay a salary that can range from €600 (around $700) to €3,000 ($3,500) per month. The second tier consists of additional four transitional players (international or homegrown) with a part-time salary. Every other member of the roster is in the homegrown salary group with marginal employment and a monthly income ranging from €100 to €450. All players under contract receive health insurance and participate in state pension insurance. Further benefits such as housing and meals during the season have to be negotiated individually.

== Teams ==
European League of Football (Europe)
Locations of teams competing in the 2025 ELF season.
- North Division
- West Division
- South Division
- East Division

For the 2025 season, the European League of Football has 16 teams in four divisions across 10 countries: 7 in Germany, 2 in Austria, one each in the Czech Republic, Denmark, France, Hungary, Spain, Poland, and Switzerland. The ELF began with 8 teams in its inaugural season in 2021. This included the Wroclaw Panthers from the Polish American Football League, and seven new franchises: the Berlin Thunder, Cologne Centurions, Frankfurt Galaxy, Hamburg Sea Devils, Leipzig Kings and Stuttgart Surge in Germany, and Barcelona Dragons in Spain. The goal of the league is to expand to at least 24 teams from 10 countries in the future. As early as 2021, Austria, France, and England were identified as markets interested in expansion franchises, and the London Warriors in particular expressed an interest in joining the league.

The Vienna Vikings and Raiders Tirol from the Austrian Football League, and the Istanbul Rams from the Turkish Gridiron Football First League joined in the 2022 season, though the Rams dropped out after the season's conclusion. A reformed Rhein Fire inspired by the historical team from NFL Europe also joined during the 2022 season after much speculation and anticipation from fans throughout the previous season. Though a feud with the Italian Football League initially precluded an Italian expansion franchise, an eventual agreement allowed the Milano Seamen to join in the 2023 season, which also saw the Fehérvár Enthroners from the Hungarian Football League and Prague Lions from the Czech League of American Football join, along with three new franchises: the Helvetic Guards from Switzerland, Munich Ravens from Germany, and Paris Musketeers from France. The Kings were suspended amid the 2023 season, the Guards were replaced by the Helvetic Mercenaries in April 2024, while the Madrid Bravos joined in 2024. Nordic Storm from Copenhagen, Denmark will be the newest addition for the 2025 season.

=== 2025 teams ===
Team	City	Stadium(s)	Capacity	Joined	Head coach
North Division
Berlin Thunder	(Germany) Berlin	Preussenstadion	3,000	2021	(Canada) Jag Bal
Hamburg Sea Devils	(Germany) Hamburg	Stadion Hoheluft	11,000	2021	(United Kingdom) Lee Rowland
Nordic Storm	(Denmark) Copenhagen/Søborg	Gladsaxe Stadium	13,800	2025	(United States) John Shoop
Rhein Fire	(Germany) Düsseldorf/Duisburg	Schauinsland-Reisen-Arena	31,514	2022	(United States) Richard Kent
West Division
Cologne Centurions	(Germany) Cologne	Südstadion	11,748	2021	(United States) Javan Lenhardt
Frankfurt Galaxy	(Germany) Frankfurt	PSD Bank Arena	12,542	2021	(United States) Bart Andrus
Paris Musketeers	(France) Paris/Bondoufle	Stade Robert Bobin	18,850	2023	(United States) Jack Del Rio
Stuttgart Surge	(Germany) Stuttgart	Gazi-Stadion auf der Waldau	11,410	2021	(United States) Jordan Neuman
South Division
Helvetic Mercenaries	(Switzerland) Zurich/Wil	Lidl Arena	6,048	2024	(United States) Marcus Herford
Madrid Bravos	(Spain) Madrid	Estadio de Vallehermoso	9,000	2024	(United States) Andrew Weidinger
Munich Ravens	(Germany) Unterhaching	Uhlsport Park	15,053	2023	(United States) Kendral Ellison
Raiders Tirol	(Austria) Innsbruck	Tivoli Stadion Tirol	16,008	2022	(United States) Jim Herrmann
East Division
Fehérvár Enthroners	(Hungary) Székesfehérvár	First Field	3,500	2023	(United States) Mark Ridgley
Prague Lions	(Czech Republic) Prague	FK Viktoria Stadion	3,327	2023	(United States) Dave Warner
Vienna Vikings	(Austria) Vienna	Generali Arena	15,000	2022	(United States) Chris Calaycay
Vienna Vikings	(Austria) Vienna	Hohe Warte Stadium	5,000	2022	(United States) Chris Calaycay
Panthers Wrocław	(Poland) Wrocław	Stadion Olimpijski	11,000	2021	(United States) Craig Kuligowski

=== Former teams until 2025 ===
Former teams in the European League of Football
Team	City	Joined	Final season	Fate
Istanbul Rams	(Turkey) Istanbul	2022	2022	Withdrew in December 2022; returned to the Turkish league
Leipzig Kings	(Germany) Leipzig	2021	2023	License withdrawn amid the 2023 season after failing to meet the league financial obligations
Helvetic Guards	(Switzerland) Zürich/Wil	2023	2023	Withdrew in April 2024, replaced by Helvetic Mercenaries
Barcelona Dragons	(Spain) Barcelona	2021	2024	Dropped out in December 2024
Milano Seamen	(Italy) Milan	2023	2024	On hiatus for 2025; not return in 2026

== Champions ==
Champions in the European League of Football
Team	Titles	Runners-up	Year(s) won	Year(s) runner-up
Rhein Fire	2	0	2023, 2024	–
Vienna Vikings	1	2	2022	2024, 2025
Frankfurt Galaxy	1	0	2021	–
Stuttgart Surge	1	1	2025	2023
Hamburg Sea Devils	0	2	–	2021, 2022

=== Championship Games ===
Key

Teams in bold are winning teams of the Championship Game

Overview of European League of Football Championship Games
No.	Year	Team 1		Team 2		Venue	City	Attendance	MVP
I	2021	Hamburg Sea Devils	30	**Frankfurt Galaxy**	**32**	Merkur Spiel-Arena	Düsseldorf, Germany	22,000	(United States) Jakeb Sullivan (QB, Frankfurt Galaxy)
II	2022	Hamburg Sea Devils	15	**Vienna Vikings**	**27**	Wörthersee Stadion	Klagenfurt, Austria	14,566	(Finland) Kimi Linnainmaa (WR, Vienna Vikings)
III	2023	**Rhein Fire**	**53**	Stuttgart Surge	34	Schauinsland-Reisen-Arena	Duisburg, Germany	31,500	(United States) Jadrian Clark (QB, Rhein Fire)
IV	2024	Vienna Vikings	20	**Rhein Fire**	**51**	Veltins-Arena	Gelsenkirchen, Germany	41,364	(United States) Jadrian Clark (QB, Rhein Fire)
V	2025	Vienna Vikings	17	**Stuttgart Surge**	**24**	MHPArena	Stuttgart, Germany	36,784	(Germany) Louis Geyer (WR, Stuttgart Surge)

== ELF All Star Game ==
Key

Teams in bold are winning teams of the All Star Game

Overview of European League of Football All-Star Games
Year	Home		Away		Venue	City	Attendance
2021	**ELF All Stars**	**26**	United States Federation of American Football	8	Friedrich-Ludwig-Jahn-Sportpark	Berlin, Germany	300

== Broadcasting ==
For the inaugural season, the league signed a deal to have 13 games, including the playoffs and championship game, broadcast live in Germany, Austria and Switzerland on ProSieben Maxx, with all other games streamed live on ran.de and More Than Sports TV. The number of games available on TV increased in 2023, with 30 games shown live on ProSieben channels, including the Championship Game on their primary channel.

All games are also available worldwide, on the league's website, service originally provided by British company StreamAMG, and, from 2023, by Endeavor Streaming.

On 30 January 2025, ELF announced an agreement with DAZN for broadcasting all the league games until 2032.

== Statistics and records ==
=== All-time table ===
As of the end of the 2025 season.

	Team	SP	Regular season				Play-offs			
	Team	SP	GP	W	L	PCT	Q	WC	SF	CG
1	(Austria) Vienna Vikings	4	47	44	3	.936	4		3–1	1–2
2	(Germany) Rhein Fire	4	48	38	10	.792	3	1–1	2–0	2–0
3	(Germany) Frankfurt Galaxy	5	58	37	21	.638	2	1–0	1–1	1–0
4	(Germany) Stuttgart Surge	5	58	33	25	.569	3	2–0	2–1	1–1
5	(Austria) Raiders Tirol	4	48	30	18	.625	1		0–1	
6	(Poland) Panthers Wroclaw	5	57	29	28	.509	2	0–1	0–1	
7	(Germany) Hamburg Sea Devils	5	58	27	31	.466	2		2–0	0–2
8	(Germany) Munich Ravens	3	36	27	9	.750	2	0–1	0-1	
9	(Germany) Berlin Thunder	5	57	25	32	.439	1	0–1		
10	(France) Paris Musketeers	3	36	23	13	.639	1	1–0	0–1	
11	(Spain) Madrid Bravos	2	24	16	8	.667	2	0–2		
12	(Germany) Cologne Centurions	5	56	16	40	.286	1		0–1	
13	(Spain) Barcelona Dragons	4	46	15	31	.326	1		0–1	
14	(Germany) Leipzig Kings	3	27	11	16	.407				
15	(Denmark) Nordic Storm	1	12	10	2	.833	1	1–0	0–1	
16	(Czech Republic) Prague Lions	3	34	8	26	.235				
17	(Italy) Milano Seamen	2	24	6	18	.250				
18	(Hungary) Fehérvár Enthroners	3	34	4	30	.118				
19	(Switzerland) Helvetic Guards	1	12	3	9	.250				
20	(Turkey) Istanbul Rams	1	12	1	11	.083				
21	(Switzerland) Helvetic Mercenaries	2	24	1	23	.042				

Only regular season games included.

== Attendances ==
=== Season averages ===
All averages include playoffs and championship games.

Season	Total gate	Games	Average	Change	High avg.	Team	Low avg.	Team
2021	94,704	43 (Note: Two games were played behind closed doors due to the COVID-19 pandemic. These games are not included in the statistics.)	2,310		3,600	Panthers Wrocław	914	Berlin Thunder
2022	249,015	75	3,327	+44.0%	8,144	Rhein Fire	435	Istanbul Rams
2023	428,631	99	4,330	+33.2%	9,814	Rhein Fire	952	Prague Lions
2024	474,103	107	4,431	+2.3%	10,786	Rhein Fire	638	Prague Lions
2025	353,647	100 (Note: One match was not played.)	3,536	−20.2%	10,205	Rhein Fire	644	Berlin Thunder

=== Historic average attendances ===
All averages include wildcard and semifinals game.

Season	BAR	BER	COL	FEH	FRA	HAM	HVG	HVM	IST	LEI	MAD	MIL	MUN	NOR	PAR	PRA	RHE	STU	TIR	VIE	WRO
2021	1,163	931	1,243		2,100	1,744				2,072								1,429			3,600
2022	1,025	3,583	1,843		5,008	3,520			435	2,600							8,144	2,084	3,692	3,085	2,344
2023	1,081	4,566	2,773	1,700	6,437	8,164	2,260			2,357		1,100	5,009		3,867	952	9,814	3,939	3,904	4,915	2,550
2024	918	3,456	2,735	1,550	7,098	9,277		1,028			1,393	740	5,035		3,389	638	10,786	4,419	3,370	6,064	5,992
2025		644	770	1,083	7,251	2,377		1,541			3,145		3,450	2,134	1,834	950	10,205	3,037	3,410	6,323	2,345
