= 2025 Madrid Bravos season =

- General manager: Jaime Martín Lostao
- Head coach: (United States) Andrew Weidinger
- Home stadium: Estadio de Vallehermoso

Results
- Record: 8–4
- Conference place: 2nd Southern
- Playoffs: Wildcard

Uniform

The 2025 Madrid Bravos season will be the second season of the Madrid Bravos team in the European League of Football. They compete in the South Division of the ELF.

After parting ways with Rip Scherer at the end of the previous season, Andrew Weidinger was hired as head coach of the team.

== Staff ==
2025 Madrid Bravos staff
Front office: General manager – Jaime Martín Lostao; Head coaches: Head coach – Andrew Weidinger; Assistant head coach –; Offensive coaches: Offensive coordinator Andrew Weidinger; Offensive line – Wade Harman; Running Backs – Abel Jorna; Tight Ends – Azael Asensi; Wide receivers - Mario Flores; Wide receivers Assistant - Diego Fernández	Defensive coaches: Defensive coordinator – Jim Collins; Defensive line – Darrel Meckley; Defensive back assistant – Miguel Ángel Maluenda; Special teams coaches: Special teams coordinator – Lee Rose; Strength and conditioning: Head strength and conditioning – Felipe Mantecón

== Roster ==
2025 Madrid Bravos roster
Quarterbacks (QB): 7 (United States) Reid Sinnett; 10 (Spain) Iván López; 12 (Spain) Diego Lliteras; Running backs (RB): 43 (Spain) Eduardo Molina; 28 (Spain) Gonzalo Haro; 21 (Finland) Nico Barrow; 8 (Spain) Justus Seelig; Wide receivers (WR): 2 (United States) Aaron Cruickshank; 11 (Germany) Sixten Dragan; 15 (Spain) Jesús García-Valcárcel; 16 (Spain) Alejandro García; 17 (Spain) Jorge García-Valcárcel; 18 (Spain) Eduardo Pérez; 80 (Spain) Jordi Torrededia; 81 (Spain) Juan Flores-Calderón; 83 (Spain) Jorge Melero; 85 (Spain) Álvaro Molano; 88 (Spain) Ivan Iordanov; Tight ends (TE): 14 (Spain) Raúl Cernuda; 44 (Spain) Emilio Ibáñez	Offensive linemen (OL): 58 (Spain) Miguel Kabankaya; 60 (Spain) Celestin Ngimbi; 76 (Spain) Gabriel Rodríguez; 64 (Spain) Elvys Núñez; 70 (Spain) Carlos España; 71 (Spain) David Culebras; 75 (Australia) Brendan Oswin; 77 (Spain) Carlos Carrasco; 78 (Germany) Yasir Raji; Defensive linemen (DL): 0 (Spain) Yago Rivero; 1 (Spain) Alejandro Fernández; 65 (Spain) Artur Pinheiro; 92 (Spain) Mamadou Ka; 92 (Spain) Nicolás Ronchel; 50 (Samoa) Sio Nofoagatoto'a; 96 (Spain) Rodrigo Sanz; 97 (Spain) Mark Gutiérrez; 98 (Spain) Víctor Dos Santos; 99 (Spain) Daniel López	Linebackers (LB): 5 (Spain) César Brugnani; 13 (Spain) Julio Aguado; 33 (Spain) Alexandre González; 35 (Spain) Víctor Albarracín; 45 (Spain) David Romero; 53 (Spain) Jorge Hernández; 55 (Spain) Javier Carrasco; 59 (Spain) Jonathan Prieto; 42 (Spain) Ignacio Diz; Defensive backs (DB): 3 (Spain) Pablo Araya; 4 (United States) Cam'ron Kelly; 6 (Spain) Lucas Masero; 20 (Spain) Pablo De Diego; 23 (United States) Michael Witherspoon; 27 (Spain) Andy Vera; 32 (Spain) Alonso Muñoz; 29 (Spain) Guillermo Fernández; 47 (Argentina) Carlos Rodríguez; Special teams (ST): 22 (Spain) Álvaro Peñas K; 24 (Spain) Antonio Sarriá P	Rookies in italics 45 active

== Regular season ==
=== Standings ===
==== Division ====
South Division
Pos	Team	GP	W	L	DIV	PF	PA	DIFF	STK	Qualification
1	Munich Ravens	12	11	1	6–0	436	269	+167	W9	Automatic playoffs (#2)
2	Madrid Bravos	12	8	4	3–3	507	297	+210	W1	Advance to playoffs (#6)
3	Raiders Tirol	12	6	6	3–3	417	300	+117	W1	
4	Helvetic Mercenaries	12	0	12	0–6	137	647	–510	L12	

Source: europeanleague.football

==== Overall ====
Overall standings
#	Team	Division	W	L	PCT	DIV	PD	STK
Division leaders
1	(Austria) Vienna Vikings	East	11	1	.917	6–0	+231	W7
2	(Germany) Munich Ravens	South	11	1	.917	6–0	+167	W9
3	(Germany) Stuttgart Surge	West	10	2	.833	5–1	+324	W6
4	(Denmark) Nordic Storm	North	10	2	.833	5–1	+231	L1
Wild cards
5	(Germany) Rhein Fire	North	8	4	.667	5–1	+134	W4
6	(Spain) Madrid Bravos	South	8	4	.667	3–3	+210	W1
Not Qualified for the Playoffs
7	(France) Paris Musketeers	West	7	5	.583	4–2	+282	L1
8	(Czech Republic) Prague Lions	East	7	5	.583	3–3	+117	W1
9	(Germany) Frankfurt Galaxy	West	6	6	.500	3–3	+16	L1
10	(Austria) Raiders Tirol	South	6	6	.500	3–3	+117	W1
11	(Poland) Panthers Wrocław	East	5	7	.417	3–3	−4	L4
12	(Germany) Hamburg Sea Devils	North	3	9	.250	2–4	−200	W1
13	(Germany) Berlin Thunder	North	3	9	.250	0–6	−119	L4
14	(Hungary) Fehérvár Enthroners	East	1	11	.083	0–6	−325	L1
15	(Switzerland) Helvetic Mercenaries	South	0	12	.000	0–6	−510	L12
16	(Germany) Cologne Centurions	West	0	12	.000	0–6	−671	L12

=== Schedule ===
Week	Date	Opponent (Note: Intra-Conference games are in bold text)	Result	Record	Venue	Att.	Recap
1	May 17	Hamburg Sea Devils	W 13–12	1–0	Estadio de Vallehermoso	3,366	Recap
2	May 24	Frankfurt Galaxy	L 33–47	1–1	Estadio de Vallehermoso	3,530	Recap
3	May 31	Helvetic Mercenaries	W 47–35	2–1	Estadio de Vallehermoso	2,281	Recap
4	June 7	at Fehérvár Enthroners	W 45–7	3–1	First Field	1,000	Recap
5	June 15	at Raiders Tirol	L 34–35	3–2	Tivoli Stadion Tirol	2,911	Recap
6	bye						
7	June 28	at Hamburg Sea Devils	W 57–0	4–2	Stadion Hoheluft		Recap
8	July 5	Munich Ravens	L 40–43	4–3	Estadio de Vallehermoso	3,064	Recap
9	July 12	Fehérvár Enthroners	W 49–22	5–3	Estadio de Vallehermoso	3,069	Recap
10	July 20	at Helvetic Mercenaries	W 61–6	6–3	Lidl Arena	1,367	Recap
11	July 26	Raiders Tirol	W 54–28	7–3	Estadio de Vallehermoso	3,559	Recap
12	bye						
13	August 10	at Munich Ravens	L 27–30	7–4	Ulhsport Park	4,585	Recap
14	August 17	at Frankfurt Galaxy	W 47–32	8–4	PSD Bank Arena	9,569	

Source: ELFdata.eu

=== Game summaries ===
Madrid Bravos vs. Hamburg Sea Devils

Quarter	1	2	3	4	Total
Sea Devils	3	6	3	0	12
Bravos	0	7	3	3	13

at Estadio de Vallehermoso, Madrid, Spain

- Date: 17 May 2025
- Game time: 20:00 CEST
- Game attendance: 3,366

Game information

First quarter

- HSD – Eric Schlomm 40-yard field goal, 5:50. Sea Devils 3–0. Drive: 10 plays, 45 yards, 6:12.

Second quarter

- HSD – Chrisman Kyei 6-yard run (missed kick), 11:17. Sea Devils 9–0. Drive: 8 plays, 99 yards, 5:33.
- MAD – Juan Flores-Calderón 5-yard pass from Reid Sinnett (Alvaro Peñas kick), 0:59. Sea Devils 9–7. Drive: 10 plays, 53 yards, 4:11.

Third quarter

- MAD – Alvaro Peñas 32-yard field goal, 2:40. Bravos 10–9. Drive: 8 plays, 34 yards, 4:36.
- HSD – Eric Schlomm 31-yard field goal, 1:03. Sea Devils 12–10. Drive: 6 plays, 62 yards, 1:37.

Fourth quarter

- MAD – Alvaro Peñas 42-yard field goal, 14:03. Bravos 13–12. Drive: 8 plays, 30 yards, 2:00.

Top passers

- HSD – Micah Leon – 20/31, 211 yards, INT
- MAD – Reid Sinnett – 21/33, 256 yards, TD

Top rushers

- HSD – Chrisman Kyei – 8 rushes, 77 yards, TD
- MAD – Nico Barrow – 12 rushes, 42 yards

Top receivers

- HSD – Terryon Robinson – 9 receptions, 124 yards
- MAD – Aron Cruickshank – 8 receptions, 123 yards

Madrid Bravos vs. Frankfurt Galaxy

Quarter	1	2	3	4	Total
Galaxy	0	20	7	20	47
Bravos	0	13	14	6	33

at Estadio de Vallehermoso, Madrid, Spain

- Date: 24 May 2025
- Game time: 20:00 CEST
- Game attendance: 3,530

Game information

First quarter

- No scoring plays

Second quarter

- FGY – Paul Kavadia-Lenhardt 4-yard pass from Matthew McKay (Ryan Rimmler kick), 14:56. Galaxy 7–0. Drive: 12 plays, 75 yards, 6:10.
- FGY – Matthew McKay 17-yard run (blocked extra point), 9:47. Galaxy 13–0. Drive: 7 plays, 56 yards, 3:42.
- MAD – Dy'Vonne Inyang extra point return, 9:47. Galaxy 13–2.
- MAD – Aron Cruickshank 8-yard pass from Reid Sinnett (Emilio Ibanez 2-point rush), 6:33. Galaxy 13–10. Drive: 6 plays, 70 yards, 3:14.
- FGY – Gerald Ameln 2-yard run (Ryan Rimmler kick), 1:53. Galaxy 20–10. Drive: 9 plays, 79 yards, 4:40.
- MAD – Alvaro Peñas 41-yard field goal, 0:10. Galaxy 20–13. Drive: 11 plays, 60 yards, 1:43.

Third quarter

- MAD – Juan Flores-Calderón 4-yard pass from Reid Sinnett (Alvaro Peñas kick), 10:22. Tied 20–20. Drive: 6 plays, 23 yards, 2:34.
- MAD – Juan Flores-Calderón 45-yard pass from Reid Sinnett (Alvaro Peñas kick), 6:17. Bravos 27–20. Drive: 5 plays, 78 yards, 2:20.
- FGY – Jens Walter 2-yard pass from Matthew McKay (Ryan Rimmler kick), 4:15. Tied 27–27. Drive: 4 plays, 72 yards, 2:02.

Fourth quarter

- FGY – Sandro Platzgummer 41-yard run (Ryan Rimmler kick), 10:30. Galaxy 34–27. Drive: 12 plays, 114 yards, 6:37.
- MAD – Nico Barrow 1-yard run (blocked extra point), 6:23. Galaxy 34–33. Drive: 7 plays, 70 yards, 4:07.
- FGY – Gerald Ameln 52-yard run (failed 2-point rush), 3:41. Galaxy 40–33. Drive: 5 plays, 70 yards, 2:56.
- FGY – Sandro Platzgummer 88-yard run (Ryan Rimmler kick), 1:46. Galaxy 47–33. Drive: 2 plays, 96 yards, 0:19.

Top passers

- FGY – Matthew McKay – 16/21, 215 yards, 2 TD, INT
- MAD – Reid Sinnett – 30/44, 459 yards, 3 TD, 2 INT

Top rushers

- FGY – Sandro Platzgummer – 18 rushes, 248 yards, 2 TD
- MAD – Justus Seelig – 5 rushes, 35 yards

Top receivers

- FGY – Terry Wright – 2 receptions, 73 yards
- MAD – Aron Cruickshank – 12 receptions, 198 yards, TD

Madrid Bravos vs. Helvetic Mercenaries

Quarter	1	2	3	4	Total
Mercenaries	0	12	7	16	35
Bravos	14	19	7	7	47

at Estadio de Vallehermoso, Madrid, Spain

- Date: 31 May 2025
- Game time: 20:00 CEST
- Game attendance: 2,281

Game information

First quarter

- MAD – Justus Seelig 6-yard run (Alvaro Peñas kick), 12:26. Bravos 7–0. Drive: 6 plays, 70 yards, 2:34.
- MAD – Eduard Molina 7-yard run (Alvaro Peñas kick), 7:53. Bravos 14–0. Drive: 7 plays, 41 yards, 3:39.

Second quarter

- MAD – Aron Cruickshank 18-yard pass from Reid Sinnett (missed kick), 9:44. Bravos 20–0. Drive: 6 plays, 84 yards, 3:52.
- MAD – Justus Seelig 8-yard pass from Reid Sinnett (Alvaro Peñas kick), 8:43. Bravos 27–0. Drive: 2 plays, 17 yards, 1:01.
- HVM – Fabio Haefliger 1-yard pass from Isaiah Weed (failed 2-point rush), 1:08. Bravos 27–6. Drive: 9 plays, 18 yards, 4:26.
- MAD – Justus Seelig 70-yard pass from Reid Sinnett (failed 2-point rush), 0:57. Bravos 33–6. Drive: 1 play, 70 yards, 0:11.
- HVM – Tyrrell Bovelle 1-yard run (failed 2-point pass from Isaiah Weed), 0:25. Bravos 33–12. Drive: 2 plays, 10 yards, 0:43.

Third quarter

- HVM – Keelan Cole, Sr. 10-yard pass from Isaiah Weed (Adrian Saliu kick), 5:57. Bravos 33–19. Drive: 3 plays, 55 yards, 1:33.
- MAD – Aron Cruickhshank 11-yard pass from Reid Sinnett (Alvaro Peñas kick), 2:03. Bravos 40–19. Drive: 7 plays, 60 yards, 3:54.

Fourth quarter

- MAD – Juan Flores-Calderón 7-yard pass from Reid Sinnett (Alvaro Peñas kick), 9:56. Bravos 47–19. Drive: 6 plays, 25 yards, 3:58.
- HVM – Tyrrell Bovelle 27-yard run (Ismael Schmid 2-point pass from Isaiah Weed), 5:14. Bravos 47–27. Drive: 7 plays, 70 yards, 4:42.
- HVM – Milan Spiller 18-yard pass from Isaiah Weed (Milan Spiller 2-point pass from Isaiah Weed), 0:30. Bravos 47–35. Drive: 9 plays, 58 yards, 3:09.

Top passers

- HVM – Isaiah Weed – 17/30, 193 yards, 3 TD
- MAD – Reid Sinnett – 19/27, 285 yards, 5 TD, INT

Top rushers

- HVM – Tyrrell Bovelle – 21 rushes, 98 yards, 2 TD
- MAD – Justus Seelig – 8 rushes, 80 yards, TD

Top receivers

- HVM – Milan Spiller – 7 receptions, 99 yards, TD
- MAD – Justus Seelig – 8 receptions, 154 yards, 2 TD

Fehérvár Enthroners vs. Madrid Bravos

Quarter	1	2	3	4	Total
Bravos	7	28	10	0	45
Enthroners	0	0	7	0	7

at First Field, Székesfehérvár, Hungary

- Date: 7 June 2025
- Game time: 19:00 CEST
- Game attendance: 1,000

Game information

First quarter

- MAD – Justus Seelig 21-yard pass from Reid Sinnett (Alvaro Peñas kick), 3:12. Bravos 7–0. Drive: 4 plays, 53 yards, 1:12.

Second quarter

- MAD – Aron Cruickshank 73-yard pass from Reid Sinnett (Alvaro Peñas kick), 14:08. Bravos 14–0. Drive: 2 plays, 90 yards, 0:48.
- MAD – Juan Flores-Calderón 39-yard pass from Reid Sinnett (Alvaro Peñas kick), 12:43. Bravos 21–0. Drive: 1 play, 39 yards, 0:07.
- MAD – Juan Flores-Calderón 23-yard pass from Reid Sinnett (Alvaro Peñas kick), 5:28. Bravos 28–0. Drive: 3 plays, 35 yards, 1:14.
- MAD – Jordi Torrededia 36-yard pass from Reid Sinnett (Alvaro Peñas kick), 1:53. Bravos 35–0. Drive: 5 plays, 70 yards, 2:04.

Third quarter

- MAD – Aaron Cruickshank 64-yard pass from Reid Sinnett (Alvaro Peñas kick), 13:47. Bravos 42–0. Drive: 2 plays, 75 yards, 1:13.
- MAD – Alvaro Peñas 24-yard field goal, 5:55. Bravos 45–0. Drive: 8 plays, 36 yards, 3:20.
- ENT – Jon Cole 25-yard pass from Mate Hegedus (Cameron Gillis kick), 0:51. Bravos 45–7. Drive: 2 plays, 44 yards, 0:52.

Fourth quarter

- No scoring plays

Top passers

- MAD – Reid Sinnett – 19/28, 431 yards, 6 TD
- ENT – Mate Hegedus – 11/27, 124 yards, TD, INT

Top rushers

- MAD – Eduard Molina – 13 rushes, 64 yards
- ENT – Jerry Peti Key – 4 rushes, 34 yards

Top receivers

- MAD – Aron Cruickshank – 8 receptions, 236 yards, 2 TD
- ENT – Rashad Still – 4 receptions, 61 yards

Raiders Tirol vs. Madrid Bravos

Quarter	1	2	3	4	Total
Bravos	7	7	7	13	34
Raiders	7	14	7	7	35

at Tivoli Stadion Tirol, Innsbruck, Austria

- Date: 15 June 2025
- Game time: 18:25 CEST
- Game attendance: 2,911

Game information

First quarter

- RAI – N'Kosi Perry 8-yard run (Jordan Loria kick), 6:54. Raiders 7–0. Drive: 13 plays, 83 yards, 5:52.
- MAD – Aron Cruickshank 27-yard pass from Reid Sinnett (Alvaro Peñas kick), 02:08. Tied 7–7 Drive: 8 plays, 50 yards, 4:46.

Second quarter

- RAI – JaCorey Sullivan 24-yard pass from N'Kosi Perry (Jordan Loria kick), 13:14. Raiders 14–7. Drive: 9 plays, 70 yards, 3:54.
- MAD – Emilio Ibanet 1-yard pass from Reid Sinnett (Alvaro Peñas kick), 5:48. Tied 14–14. Drive: 12 plays, 68 yards, 7:26.
- RAI – Philip Haun 22-yard pass from N'Kosi Perry (Jordan Loria kick), 1:54. Raiders 21–14. Drive: 3 plays, 32 yards, 1:01.

Third quarter

- RAI – Lukas Haslwanter 52-yard run (Jordan Loria kick), 12:40. Raiders 28–14. Drive: 5 plays, 85 yards, 2:20.
- MAD – Emilio Ibanez 1-yard pass from Reid Sinnett (Alvaro Peñas kick), 4:23. Raiders 28–21. Drive: 13 plays, 75 yards, 8:17.

Fourth quarter

- RAI – Tobias Bonatti 2-yard run (Jordan Loria kick), 10:14. Raiders 35–21. Drive: 16 plays, 59 yards, 9:09.
- MAD – Aron Cruickshank 63-yard pass from Reid Sinnett (Alvaro Peñas kick), 9:10. Raiders 35–28. Drive: 3 plays, 70 yards, 1:04.
- MAD – Aron Cruickshank 4-yard pass from Reid Sinnett (failed 2-point rush), 0:16. Raiders 35–34. Drive: 10 plays, 54 yards, 4:40.

Top passers

- MAD – Reid Sinnett – 24/37, 254 yards, 5 TD
- RAI – N'Kosi Perry – 16/27, 216 yards, 2 TD

Top rushers

- MAD – Aron Cruickshank – 3 rushes, 32 yards
- RAI – Lukas Haslwanter – 21 rushes, 128 yards, TD

Top receivers

- MAD – Aron Cruickshank – 11 receptions, 146 yards, 3 TD
- RAI – JaCorey Sullivan – 4 receptions, 97 yards, TD

Hamburg Sea Devils vs. Madrid Bravos

Quarter	1	2	3	4	Total
Bravos	13	20	14	10	57
Sea Devils	0	0	0	0	0

at Stadion Hoheluft, Hamburg, Germany

- Date: 28 June 2025
- Game time: 15:00 CEST
Madrid Bravos vs. Munich Ravens

Quarter	1	2	3	4	Total
Ravens	0	9	20	14	43
Bravos	14	12	0	14	40

at Estadio de Vallehermoso, Madrid, Spain

- Date: 5 May 2025
- Game time: 20:00 CEST
- Game attendance: 3,064
Madrid Bravos vs. Fehérvár Enthroners

Quarter	1	2	3	4	Total
Enthroners	0	7	0	15	22
Bravos	14	7	21	7	49

at Estadio de Vallehermoso, Madrid, Spain

- Date: 12 July 2025
- Game time: 20:00 CEST
- Game attendance: 3,069
Helvetic Mercenaries vs. Madrid Bravos

Quarter	1	2	3	4	Total
Bravos	14	27	7	13	61
Mercenaries	0	0	0	6	6

at Lidl Arena, Wil, Switzerland

- Date: 20 July 2025
- Game time: 13:00 CEST
- Game attendance: 1,367
Madrid Bravos vs. Raiders Tirol

Quarter	1	2	3	4	Total
Raiders	0	20	0	8	28
Bravos	20	3	22	9	54

at Estadio de Vallehermoso, Madrid, Spain

- Date: 27 May 2025
- Game time: 20:00 CEST
- Game attendance: 3,559
Munich Ravens vs. Madrid Bravos

Quarter	1	2	3	4	Total
Bravos	0	7	6	14	27
Ravens	7	7	0	16	30

at Sportpark Unterhaching, Unterhaching, Germany

- Date: 10 August 2025
- Game time: 13:00 CEST
- Game attendance: 4,585
Frankfurt Galaxy vs. Madrid Bravos

Quarter	1	2	3	4	Total
Bravos	6	14	13	14	47
Ravens	6	10	0	16	32

at PSD Bank Arena, Frankfurt am Main, Germany

- Date: 17 August 2025
- Game time: 13:00 CEST
- Game attendance: 9,569

== Play-offs ==
Week	Date	Opponent	Result	Record	Venue	Att.	Recap
Wild card	August 23	at Stuttgart Surge	L 17–41	0–1	Gazi-Stadion auf der Waldau	2,500	

=== Game summaries ===
Madrid Bravos vs. Stuttgart Surge

Quarter	1	2	3	4	Total
Bravos	0	3	0	14	17
Surge	0	21	7	13	41

at Gazi-Stadion auf der Waldau, Stuttgart, Germany

- Date: 23 August 2025
- Game time: 15:00 CEST
- Game attendance: 2,500
- Referee: J. Haentjens
