= 2025 European League of Football season =

2025 ELF season
- League: European League of Football
- Sport: American football
- Duration: May 17, 2025 – September 7, 2025
- Games: 96 + 5 playoff games
- Teams: 16
- North Division champions: (Denmark) Nordic Storm
- West Division champions: (Germany) Stuttgart Surge
- South Division champions: (Germany) Munich Ravens
- East Division champions: (Austria) Vienna Vikings

2025 Championship Game
- Date: September 7, 2025
- Venue: MHPArena, Stuttgart
- Champions: Stuttgart Surge

Seasons
- 2024 AFLE 2026; EFA 2026

The 2025 ELF season was the fifth season and final season of the European League of Football, a professional American football league based in Europe. Sixteen teams from nine countries participated. The season started on May 17, 2025, and concluded with the ELF Championship Game in the MHPArena Stuttgart, Germany on September 7, 2025.

== Format ==
The 16 teams are divided into four divisions of 4 teams. Each team plays 12 games during the regular season, six in the division and two games versus one from each other division.

On January 29, 2025 the league announced to expand the homegrown territories for multiple teams. Most of each teams' players need to be homegrown, i.e. they need to have started playing football in the same country that the team is based in. Now, players from Estonia, Latvia, Lithuania and Ukraine will also be considered homegrown for the Panthers Wrocław, players from Slovakia are considered homegrown for the Prague Lions, and players from Romania and Serbia for the Fehérvár Enthroners. Players from western Northern Italy are considered homegrown for the Helvetic Mercenaries while those from eastern Northern Italy are so for the two Austrian franchises. The Nordic Storm had already been announced as having Denmark and Sweden as their homegrown territory in September.

== Teams ==
2025 European League of Football season (Europe)
Locations of teams competing in the 2025 ELF season.
- North Division
- West Division
- South Division
- East Division

Of the 17 teams from the 2024 season, 15 are competing in 2025, and are joined by one new expansion team: the Nordic Storm. Teams not returning for the new season are the Barcelona Dragons, and the Milano Seamen, the latter on hiatus with plans to return to the league in 2026.

Berlin Thunder left the Großes Stadion of Friedrich-Ludwig-Jahn-Sportpark whose demolition started after the 2024 season, and planned to move to the adjacent Kleines Stadion after expanding it with temporary stands for 3,500 to 5,000 people. After these plans fell through Thunder moved into the Preussenstadion. The Helvetic Mercenaries are moving to the Lidl Arena in Wil where the Helvetic Guards played during their only season in 2023. The Hamburg Sea Devils will return to Stadion Hoheluft, after playing home games in stadiums all over northern Germany.

Team	City	Stadium	Capacity	Head Coach	Record 2024
North Division
Berlin Thunder	(Germany) Berlin	Preussenstadion	3,000	(Canada) Jag Bal	5–7
Hamburg Sea Devils	(Germany) Hamburg	Stadion Hoheluft (4 games)	8,000	(United Kingdom) Lee Rowland	2–10
Hamburg Sea Devils	(Germany) Hamburg	Sportpark Eimsbüttel (1 game)	2,018	(United Kingdom) Lee Rowland	2–10
Hamburg Sea Devils	(Germany) Bremen	Weserstadion (1 game)	42,100	(United Kingdom) Lee Rowland	2–10
Nordic Storm	(Denmark) Copenhagen/Søborg	Gladsaxe Stadion	13,507	(United States) John Shoop	new -
Rhein Fire	(Germany) Duisburg	Schauinsland-Reisen-Arena (5 games)	31,500	(United States) Jim Tomsula	11–1, Champion
Rhein Fire	(Germany) Düsseldorf	Merkur Spiel-Arena (1 game)	54,600	(United States) Jim Tomsula	11–1, Champion
West Division
Cologne Centurions	(Germany) Cologne	Südstadion	11,748	(United States) Javan Lendhardt	6–6
Frankfurt Galaxy	(Germany) Frankfurt am Main	PSD Bank Arena (4 games)	12,542	(United States) Bart Andrus	4–8
Frankfurt Galaxy	(Germany) Offenbach am Main	Stadion am Bieberer Berg (2 games)	20,500	(United States) Bart Andrus	4–8
Paris Musketeers	(France) Paris/Bondoufle	Stade Robert Bobin	18,850	(United States) Jack Del Rio	10–2, Semifinal
Stuttgart Surge	(Germany) Stuttgart	Gazi-Stadion auf der Waldau	11,408	(United States) Jordan Neuman	11–1, Semifinal
South Division
Helvetic Mercenaries	(Switzerland) Zurich/Wil	Lidl Arena	6,000	(United States) Marcus Herford	1–11
Madrid Bravos	(Spain) Madrid	Estadio Vallehermoso	10,000	(United States) Andrew Weidinger	8–4, Wild Card
Munich Ravens	(Germany) Munich/Unterhaching	Uhlsport Park	15,053	(United States) Kendral Ellison	9–3, Wild Card
Raiders Tirol	(Austria) Innsbruck	Tivoli Stadion Tirol	17,400	(United States) Jim Herrmann	8–4
East Division
Fehérvár Enthroners	(Hungary) Székesfehérvár	First Field	4,000	(United States) Mark Ridgley	2–10
Prague Lions	(Czech Republic) Prague	FK Viktoria Stadion	3,327	(United States) Dave Warner	1–11
Vienna Vikings	(Austria) Vienna	Generali Arena (2 games)	15,014	(United States) Chris Calaycay	12–0, Final
Vienna Vikings	(Austria) Vienna	Hohe Warte Stadium (2 games)	5,500	(United States) Chris Calaycay	12–0, Final
Vienna Vikings	(Austria) Maria Enzersdorf	Datenpol Arena (1 game)	10,600	(United States) Chris Calaycay	12–0, Final
Vienna Vikings	(Austria) Wiener Neustadt	Wiener Neustadt ERGO Arena (2 games)	4,000	(United States) Chris Calaycay	12–0, Final
Panthers Wrocław	(Poland) Wrocław	Stadion Olimpijski	11,000	(United States) Craig Kuligowski	6–6

== Regular season ==
=== Schedule ===
==== Week 1 ====
Date	Division	Away team	Result	Home team	Venue	Attendance	Ref
Sat, 17 May	ID	Hamburg Sea Devils	12 – 13	Madrid Bravos	Estadio Vallehermoso, Madrid	3,366	
Sat, 17 May	ID	Rhein Fire	17 – 15	Paris Musketeers	Stade Robert Bobin, Bondoufle	2,348	
Sat, 17 May	East	Fehérvár Enthroners	12 – 55	Panthers Wrocław	Stadion Olimpijski, Wrocław	2,563	
Sun, 18 May	ID	Cologne Centurions	14 – 64	Berlin Thunder	Preussenstadion, Berlin	628	
Sun, 18 May	ID	Nordic Storm	56 – 12	Helvetic Mercenaries	Lidl Arena, Wil	2,300	
Sun, 18 May	West	Frankfurt Galaxy	20 – 33	Stuttgart Surge	Gazi-Stadion auf der Waldau, Stuttgart	3,711	
Sun, 18 May	South	Raiders Tirol	7 – 20	Munich Ravens	Uhlsport Park, Unterhaching	3,395	
Sun, 18 May	East	Vienna Vikings	28 – 6	Prague Lions	FK Viktoria Stadion, Prague	1,200	

==== Week 2 ====
Date	Division	Away team	Result	Home team	Venue	Attendance	Ref
Sat, 24 May	ID	Frankfurt Galaxy	47 – 33	Madrid Bravos	Estadio Vallehermoso	3,530	
Sat, 24 May	East	Fehérvár Enthroners	15 – 62	Vienna Vikings	Hohe Warte Stadium, Vienna	4,201	
Sun, 25 May	ID	Nordic Storm	40 – 21	Panthers Wrocław	Stadion Olimpijski, Wrocław	2,952	
Sun, 25 May	ID	Berlin Thunder	16 – 38	Munich Ravens	Uhlsport Park, Unterhaching	2,755	
Sun, 25 May	ID	Hamburg Sea Devils	28 – 13	Prague Lions	FK Viktoria Stadion, Prague	900	
Sun, 25 May	South	Helvetic Mercenaries	6 – 44	Raiders Tirol	Tivoli Stadion Tirol, Innsbruck	3,346	
Sun, 25 May	West	Stuttgart Surge	0 – 6	Paris Musketeers	Stade Robert Bobin, Bondoufle	1,454	
Bye		Rhein Fire, Cologne Centurions					

==== Week 3 ====
Date	Division	Away team	Result	Home team	Venue	Attendance	Ref
Sat, 31 May	East	Prague Lions	40 – 0	Fehérvár Enthroners	First Field, Székesfehérvár	1,200	
Sat, 31 May	ID	Raiders Tirol	68 – 0	Cologne Centurions	Südstadion, Cologne	960	
Sat, 31 May	ID	Stuttgart Surge	53 – 14	Hamburg Sea Devils	Weserstadion, Bremen	5,750	
Sat, 31 May	South	Helvetic Mercenaries	35 – 47	Madrid Bravos	Estadio Vallehermoso, Madrid	2,281	
Sun, 1 June	West	Paris Musketeers	27 – 29	Frankfurt Galaxy	Stadion am Bieberer Berg, Offenbach	10,257	
Sun, 1 June	North	Berlin Thunder	0 – 35	Nordic Storm	Gladsaxe Stadion, Søborg	2,700	
Sun, 1 June	ID	Vienna Vikings	12 – 7	Rhein Fire	Merkur Spiel-Arena, Düsseldorf	20,342	
Bye		Panthers Wrocław, Munich Ravens					

==== Week 4 ====
Date	Division	Away team	Result	Home team	Venue	Attendance	Ref
Sat, 7 June	North	Berlin Thunder	14 – 31	Hamburg Sea Devils	Stadion Hoheluft, Hamburg	2,000	
Sat, 7 June	ID	Raiders Tirol	7 – 41	Vienna Vikings	Generali Arena, Vienna	10,275	
Sat, 7 June	ID	Madrid Bravos	45 – 7	Fehérvár Enthroners	First Field, Székesfehérvár	1,000	
Sun, 8 June	East	Prague Lions	45 – 13	Panthers Wrocław	Stadion Olimpijski, Wrocław	2,859	
Sun, 8 June	West	Cologne Centurions	15 – 47	Frankfurt Galaxy	Stadion am Bieberer Berg, Offenbach	5,561	
Sun, 8 June	ID	Munich Ravens	28 – 36	Stuttgart Surge	Gazi-Stadion auf der Waldau, Stuttgart	3,213	
Sun, 8 June	ID	Paris Musketeers	31 – 7	Rhein Fire	Schauinsland-Reisen-Arena, Duisburg	7,295	
Bye		Nordic Storm, Helvetic Mercenaries					

==== Week 5 ====
Date	Division	Away team	Result	Home team	Venue	Attendance	Ref
Sat, 14 June	North	Hamburg Sea Devils	0 – 43	Rhein Fire	Schauinsland-Reisen-Arena, Duisburg	7,362	
Sat, 14 June	ID	Panthers Wrocław	57 – 3	Cologne Centurions	Südstadion, Cologne	765	
Sun, 15 June	ID	Fehérvár Enthroners	21 – 38	Berlin Thunder	Preussenstadion, Berlin	762	
Sun, 15 June	ID	Frankfurt Galaxy	0 – 35	Nordic Storm	Gladsaxe Stadion, Søborg	1,937	
Sun, 15 June	South	Madrid Bravos	34 – 35	Raiders Tirol	Tivoli Stadion Tirol, Innsbruck	2,911	
Sun, 15 June	South	Helvetic Mercenaries	14 – 58	Munich Ravens	Uhlsport Park, Unterhaching	2,425	
Bye		Prague Lions, Vienna Vikings, Paris Musketeers, Stuttgart Surge					

==== Week 6 ====
Date	Division	Away team	Result	Home team	Venue	Attendance	Ref
Sun, 22 June	ID	Rhein Fire	33 – 26	Vienna Vikings	Generali Arena, Vienna	11,468	
Sun, 22 June	ID	Panthers Wrocław	19 – 47	Nordic Storm	Gladsaxe Stadion, Søborg	1,609	
Sun, 22 June	South	Raiders Tirol	44 – 12	Helvetic Mercenaries	Lidl Arena, Wil	1,319	
Sun, 22 June	ID	Munich Ravens	35 – 12	Berlin Thunder	Preussenstadion, Berlin	483	
Sun, 22 June	ID	Prague Lions	19 – 14	Hamburg Sea Devils	Stadion Hoheluft, Hamburg	1,800	
Sun, 22 June	West	Cologne Centurions	7 – 88	Stuttgart Surge	Gazi-Stadion auf der Waldau, Stuttgart	2,451	
Sun, 22 June	West	Frankfurt Galaxy	16 – 35	Paris Musketeers	Stade Robert Bobin, Bondoufle	1,700	
Bye		Fehérvár Enthroners, Madrid Bravos					

==== Week 7 ====
Date	Division	Away team	Result	Home team	Venue	Attendance	Ref
Sat, 28 June	ID	Madrid Bravos	57 – 0	Hamburg Sea Devils	Sportpark Eimsbüttel, Hamburg	914	
Sat, 28 June	ID	Helvetic Mercenaries	0 - 35	Nordic Storm	Gladsaxe Stadion, Søborg	forfeited	
Sat, 28 June	East	Panthers Wrocław	24 – 19	Fehérvár Enthroners	First Field, Székesfehérvár	1,300	
Sun, 29 June	ID	Prague Lions	37 – 16	Frankfurt Galaxy	PSD Bank Arena, Frankfurt am Main	6,221	
Sun, 29 June	ID	Vienna Vikings	44 – 38	Raiders Tirol	Tivoli Stadion Tirol, Innsbruck	3,676	
Sun, 29 June	ID	Stuttgart Surge	33 – 36	Munich Ravens	Uhlsport Park, Unterhaching	3,347	
Sun, 29 June	North	Rhein Fire	44 – 7	Berlin Thunder	Preussenstadion, Berlin	624	
Sun, 29 June	West	Paris Musketeers	62 – 0	Cologne Centurions	Südstadion, Cologne	750	

==== Week 8 ====
Date	Division	Away team	Result	Home team	Venue	Attendance	Ref
Sat, 5 July	South	Munich Ravens	43 – 40	Madrid Bravos	Estadio Vallehermoso, Madrid	3,064	
Sat, 5 July	ID	Rhein Fire	18 – 35	Raiders Tirol	Tivoli Stadion Tirol, Innsbruck	3,424	
Sat, 5 July	East	Prague Lions	0 – 34	Vienna Vikings	Datenpol Arena, Maria Enzersdorf	3,827	
Sun, 6 July	North	Nordic Storm	27 – 21	Hamburg Sea Devils	Stadion Hoheluft, Hamburg	1,900	
Sun, 6 July	ID	Cologne Centurions	2 – 54	Panthers Wrocław	Stadion Olimpijski, Wrocław	1,748	
Sun, 6 July	ID	Fehérvár Enthroners	12 – 55	Stuttgart Surge	Gazi-Stadion auf der Waldau, Stuttgart	2,349	
Sun, 6 July	ID	Paris Musketeers	62 – 0	Helvetic Mercenaries	Lidl Arena, Wil	1,684	
Bye		Berlin Thunder, Frankfurt Galaxy					

==== Week 9 ====
Date	Division	Away team	Result	Home team	Venue	Attendance	Ref
Sat, 12 July	ID	Fehérvár Enthroners	22 – 49	Madrid Bravos	Estadio Vallehermoso, Madrid	3,069	
Sat, 12 July	West	Stuttgart Surge	54 – 39	Frankfurt Galaxy	PSD Bank Arena, Frankfurt am Main	6,077	
Sat, 12 July	South	Munich Ravens	34 – 20	Helvetic Mercenaries	Lidl Arena, Wil	1,124	
Sun, 13 July	North	Rhein Fire	24 – 25	Nordic Storm	Gladsaxe Stadion, Søborg	2,378	
Sun, 13 July	ID	Berlin Thunder	45 – 2	Cologne Centurions	Südstadion, Cologne	580	
Sun, 13 July	ID	Vienna Vikings	40 – 33	Paris Musketeers	Stade Robert Bobin, Bondoufle	2,300	
Sun, 13 July	East	Panthers Wrocław	41 – 37	Prague Lions	FK Viktoria Stadion, Prague	1,061	
Bye		Hamburg Sea Devils, Raiders Tirol					

==== Week 10 ====
Date	Division	Away team	Result	Home team	Venue	Attendance	Ref
Sat, 19 July	East	Vienna Vikings	38 – 12	Panthers Wrocław	Stadion Olimpijski, Wrocław	2,113	
Sat, 19 July	South	Munich Ravens	31 – 24	Raiders Tirol	Tivoli Stadion Tirol, Innsbruck	3,724	
Sat, 19 July	West	Frankfurt Galaxy	74 – 10	Cologne Centurions	Südstadion, Cologne	806	
Sun, 20 July	North	Nordic Storm	53 – 35	Berlin Thunder	Preussenstadion, Berlin	438	
Sun, 20 July	North	Rhein Fire	25 – 13	Hamburg Sea Devils	Stadion Hoheluft, Hamburg	1,900	
Sun, 20 July	West	Paris Musketeers	8 – 26	Stuttgart Surge	Gazi-Stadion auf der Waldau, Stuttgart	3,740	
Sun, 20 July	East	Fehérvár Enthroners	6 – 10	Prague Lions	FK Viktoria Stadion, Prague	708	
Sun, 20 July	South	Madrid Bravos	61 – 6	Helvetic Mercenaries	Lidl Arena, Wil	1,367	

==== Week 11 ====
Date	Division	Away team	Result	Home team	Venue	Attendance	Ref
Sat, 26 July	South	Raiders Tirol	28 – 54	Madrid Bravos	Estadio Vallehermoso, Madrid	3,559	
Sat, 26 July	West	Cologne Centurions	7 – 74	Paris Musketeers	Stade Robert Bobin, Bondoufle	1,500	
Sat, 26 July	East	Vienna Vikings	53 – 16	Fehérvár Enthroners	First Field, Székesfehérvár	1,000	
Sun, 27 July	North	Berlin Thunder	7 – 69	Rhein Fire	Schauinsland-Reisen-Arena, Duisburg	8,246	
Sun, 27 July	ID	Nordic Storm	20 – 35	Frankfurt Galaxy	PSD Bank Arena, Frankfurt am Main	5,821	
Sun, 27 July	ID	Hamburg Sea Devils	0 – 48	Stuttgart Surge	Gazi-Stadion auf der Waldau, Stuttgart	2,756	
Sun, 27 July	ID	Panthers Wrocław	14 – 34	Munich Ravens	Uhlsport Park, Unterhaching	4,191	
Sun, 27 July	ID	Prague Lions	60 – 20	Helvetic Mercenaries	Lidl Arena, Wil	1,452	

==== Week 12 ====
Date	Division	Away team	Result	Home team	Venue
2/3 August	All teams on bye				

==== Week 13 ====
Date	Division	Away team	Result	Home team	Venue	Attendance	Ref
Sat, 9 August	East	Panthers Wrocław	36 – 50	Vienna Vikings	Wiener Neustadt ERGO Arena, Wiener Neustadt	3,634	
Sat, 9 August	West	Stuttgart Surge	44 – 3	Cologne Centurions	Südstadion, Cologne	756	
Sat, 9 August	ID	Helvetic Mercenaries	0 – 77	Paris Musketeers	Stade Robert Bobin, Bondoufle	1,700	
Sat, 9 August	ID	Berlin Thunder	31 – 34	Fehérvár Enthroners	First Field, Székesfehérvár	1,000	
Sun, 10 August	North	Hamburg Sea Devils	7 – 40	Nordic Storm	Gladsaxe Stadion, Søborg	2,048	
Sun, 10 August	South	Madrid Bravos	27 – 30	Munich Ravens	Uhlsport Park, Unterhaching	4,585	
Sun, 10 August	ID	Raiders Tirol	24 – 34	Rhein Fire	Schauinsland-Reisen-Arena, Duisburg	7,821	
Sun, 10 August	ID	Frankfurt Galaxy	28 – 21	Prague Lions	FK Viktoria Stadion, Prague	844	

==== Week 14 ====
Date	Division	Away team	Result	Home team	Venue	Attendance	Ref
Sat, 16 August	ID	Paris Musketeers	29 – 35	Vienna Vikings	Wiener Neustadt ERGO Arena, Wiener Neustadt	4,532	
Sat, 16 August	ID	Stuttgart Surge	47 – 20	Fehérvár Enthroners	First Field, Székesfehérvár	1,000	
Sat, 16 August	ID	Munich Ravens	49 – 26	Panthers Wrocław	Stadion Olimpijski, Wrocław	1,832	
Sun, 17 August	North	Hamburg Sea Devils	56 – 44	Berlin Thunder	Preussenstadion, Berlin	931	
Sun, 17 August	North	Nordic Storm	19 – 27	Rhein Fire	Schauinsland-Reisen-Arena, Duisburg	10,163	
Sun, 17 August	ID	Madrid Bravos	47 – 32	Frankfurt Galaxy	PSD Bank Arena, Frankfurt am Main	9,569	
Sun, 17 August	ID	Cologne Centurions	6 – 63	Raiders Tirol	Tivoli Stadion Tirol, Innsbruck	3,381	
Sun, 17 August	ID	Helvetic Mercenaries	12 – 69	Prague Lions	FK Viktoria Stadion, Prague	988	

== Standings ==
West Division
Pos	Team	GP	W	L	DIV	PF	PA	DIFF	STK	Qualification
1	Stuttgart Surge	12	10	2	5–1	517	193	+324	W6	Automatic playoffs (#3)
2	Paris Musketeers	12	7	5	4–2	459	177	+282	L1	
3	Frankfurt Galaxy	12	6	6	3–3	383	367	+16	L1	
4	Cologne Centurions	12	0	12	0–6	69	740	–671	L12	

Source: europeanleague.football

North Division
Pos	Team	GP	W	L	DIV	PF	PA	DIFF	STK	Qualification
1	Nordic Storm	12	10	2	5–1	432	201	+231	L1	Automatic playoffs (#4)
2	Rhein Fire	12	8	4	5–1	348	214	+134	W4	Advance to playoffs (#5)
3	Hamburg Sea Devils	12	3	9	2–4	196	396	−200	W1	
4	Berlin Thunder	12	3	9	0–6	313	432	−119	L4	

Source: europeanleague.football

East Division
Pos	Team	GP	W	L	DIV	PF	PA	DIFF	STK	Qualification
1	Vienna Vikings	12	11	1	6–0	463	232	+231	W7	
2	Prague Lions	12	7	5	3–3	357	240	+117	W1	
3	Panthers Wrocław	12	5	7	3–3	372	376	-4	L4	
4	Fehérvár Enthroners	12	1	11	0–6	184	509	−325	L1	

Source: europeanleague.football

South Division
Pos	Team	GP	W	L	DIV	PF	PA	DIFF	STK	Qualification
1	Munich Ravens	12	11	1	6–0	436	269	+167	W9	Automatic playoffs (#2)
2	Madrid Bravos	12	8	4	3–3	507	297	+210	W1	Advance to playoffs (#6)
3	Raiders Tirol	12	6	6	3–3	417	300	+117	W1	
4	Helvetic Mercenaries	12	0	12	0–6	137	647	–510	L12	

Source: europeanleague.football

Overall standings
#	Team	Division	W	L	PCT	DIV	PD	STK
Division leaders
1	(Austria) Vienna Vikings	East	11	1	.917	6–0	+231	W7
2	(Germany) Munich Ravens	South	11	1	.917	6–0	+167	W9
3	(Germany) Stuttgart Surge	West	10	2	.833	5–1	+324	W6
4	(Denmark) Nordic Storm	North	10	2	.833	5–1	+231	L1
Wild cards
5	(Germany) Rhein Fire	North	8	4	.667	5–1	+134	W4
6	(Spain) Madrid Bravos	South	8	4	.667	3–3	+210	W1
Not Qualified for the Playoffs
7	(France) Paris Musketeers	West	7	5	.583	4–2	+282	L1
8	(Czech Republic) Prague Lions	East	7	5	.583	3–3	+117	W1
9	(Germany) Frankfurt Galaxy	West	6	6	.500	3–3	+16	L1
10	(Austria) Raiders Tirol	South	6	6	.500	3–3	+117	W1
11	(Poland) Panthers Wrocław	East	5	7	.417	3–3	−4	L4
12	(Germany) Hamburg Sea Devils	North	3	9	.250	2–4	−200	W1
13	(Germany) Berlin Thunder	North	3	9	.250	0–6	−119	L4
14	(Hungary) Fehérvár Enthroners	East	1	11	.083	0–6	−325	L1
15	(Switzerland) Helvetic Mercenaries	South	0	12	.000	0–6	−510	L12
16	(Germany) Cologne Centurions	West	0	12	.000	0–6	−671	L12

== Play-offs ==
The wildcard games will be played on August 23 and 24, the semifinals on August 30 and 31, and the final was held on September 7, 2025, in Stuttgart, Germany.

Wildcard
4	(Denmark) Nordic Storm	28
5	(Germany) Rhein Fire	23
3	(Germany) Stuttgart Surge	41
6	(Spain) Madrid Bravos	17

Semifinals
1	(Austria) Vienna Vikings	28
4	(Denmark) Nordic Storm	20
2	(Germany) Munich Ravens	13
3	(Germany) Stuttgart Surge	27

Championship Game
1	(Austria) Vienna Vikings	17
3	(Germany) Stuttgart Surge	24

=== Wildcard ===
==== Stuttgart Surge 41, Madrid Bravos 17 ====
Madrid Bravos vs. Stuttgart Surge

Quarter	1	2	3	4	Total
Bravos	0	3	0	14	17
Surge	0	21	7	13	41

at Gazi-Stadion auf der Waldau, Stuttgart, Germany

- Date: 23 August
- Game time: 15:00 CEST
- Game attendance: 2,500
- Referee: J. Haentjens

==== Nordic Storm 28, Rhein Fire 23 ====
Rhein Fire vs. Nordic Storm

Quarter	1	2	3	4	Total
Fire	6	3	7	7	23
Storm	7	13	0	8	28

at Gladsaxe Stadion, Søborg, Denmark

- Date: 24 August
- Game time: 15:00 CEST
- Game attendance: 2,313
- Referee: F. Kristensen

=== Semi-Finals ===
==== Vienna Vikings 28, Nordic Storm 20 ====
Nordic Storm vs. Vienna Vikings

Quarter	1	2	3	4	Total
Storm	7	7	6	0	20
Vikings	6	8	14	0	28

at Hohe Warte Stadium, Vienna, Austria

- Date: 30 August
- Game time: 15:00 CEST
- Game attendance: 5,122
- Referee: S. Hameder

==== Stuttgart Surge 27, Munich Ravens 13 ====
Stuttgart Surge vs. Munich Ravens

Quarter	1	2	3	4	Total
Surge	7	7	6	7	27
Ravens	7	0	6	0	13

at Uhlsport Park, Unterhaching, Germany

- Date: 31 August
- Game time: 15:00 CEST
- Referee: K. Walentynowicz

=== Championship Game ===
==== Stuttgart Surge 24, Vienna Vikings 17 ====
Stuttgart Surge vs. Vienna Vikings

Quarter	1	2	3	4	Total
Surge	7	7	3	7	24
Vikings	10	7	0	0	17

at MHPArena, Stuttgart, Germany

- Date: 7 September
- Game time: 15:00 CEST
- Game attendance: 36,784
- Referee: J. Ford-Bannister

== Records, Milestones, and Notable Statistics ==
Week 1

- The Munich Ravens win their season opener for the first time in franchise history.

Week 2

- The Paris Musketeers defeat the Stuttgart Surge 6–0, the lowest-scoring game in ELF history.

Week 3

- The Vienna Vikings defeated the Rhein Fire 12–7, the Fire's first loss in Düsseldorf in franchise history.
- Omari Williams (Rhein) records his 14th interception in ELF play, breaking the league record for all-time career interceptions.

Week 6

- The Rhein Fire defeat the Vienna Vikings 33–26, the first regular season loss for Vienna since the 2022 season, a winning streak of 26 regular season games and 1,022 days.

Week 7

- All seven matches result in an unprecedented final score in ELF history.

Week 10

- The Prague Lions win their first home game in ELF competition.

Week 11

- Reece Horn (Vienna) scores his 50th touchdown in ELF competition.
- Aron Cruickshank (Madrid) breaks the ELF single-season receiving touchdown record with his 18th touchdown, breaking the previous record of 17 held by Markell Castle and Kyle Sweet.
- Harlan Kwofie (Rhein) sets the ELF single-game receiving touchdown record with six, all in the first half.

Week 13

- Reid Sinnett (Madrid) breaks the ELF record for single-season passing yards with 3,594 through 11 games, surpassing the previous record of 3,586 set by Jadrian Clark in 2023.

Week 14

- DJ Irons (Wrocław) becomes the first quarterback in ELF history to rush for over 1,000 yards in a season.
- The Prague Lions finish the season with a winning record for the first time in ELF play.
- Aron Cruickshank (Madrid) breaks the ELF single-season records for receptions (122) and receiving yards (1,729), and extends his receiving touchdowns record to 20 on the year.

Wildcard Round

- The Nordic Storm defeat the Rhein Fire 28–23, both the first playoff win for the Storm and first playoff loss for the Fire.

Championship Game

- The Stuttgart Surge win their first ELF championship, defeating the Vienna Vikings 24–17. Stuttgart native Louis Geyer is name Most Valuable Player of the game.
- German hip-hop group Die Fantastischen Vier perform in the very first ELF Championship Game Halftime Show.

League Awards

- The ELF debuts the Offensive Lineman of the Year and Comeback Player of the Year awards. Brendan Oswin (Madrid) and Jon Cole (Fehérvár) are named the inaugural recipients of the awards.
- Devan Burrell (Helvetic) wins Special Teams Player of the Year for the third-straight season.

== Attendance ==
Pos	Team	Total	High	Low	Average	Change
1	Rhein Fire	61,229	20,342	7,295	10,205	−10.4%
2	Frankfurt Galaxy	43,506	10,257	5,561	7,251	+2.2%
3	Vienna Vikings	37,937	11,468	3,634	6,323	+17.8%
4	Munich Ravens	20,698	4,585	2,425	3,450	−31.5%
5	Raiders Tirol	20,462	3,724	2,911	3,410	+1.2%
6	Madrid Bravos	18,869	3,559	2,281	3,145	+125.8%
7	Stuttgart Surge	18,220	3,740	2,349	3,037	−28.6%
8	Hamburg Sea Devils	14,264	5,750	914	2,377	−74.4%
9	Panthers Wrocław	14,067	2,952	1,748	2,345	−60.9%
10	Paris Musketeers	11,002	2,348	1,454	1,834	−46.9%
11	Nordic Storm	10,672	2,700	1,609	2,134	n/a
12	Helvetic Mercenaries	9,246	2,300	1,124	1,541	+49.9%
13	Fehérvár Enthroners	6,500	1,300	1,000	1,083	−30.1%
14	Prague Lions	5,701	1,200	708	950	+48.9%
15	Cologne Centurions	4,617	960	580	770	−71.8%
16	Berlin Thunder	3,866	931	438	644	−81.4%
	League total	300,856	20,342	483	3,167	−20.5%

Updated to games played on 07 September 2025

== Statistical leaders ==
As of August 19, 2025

Category	Player	Position	Team	GP	Stat
Passing
Yards	Reid Sinnett (United States)	QB	Madrid Bravos	12	3953
Touchdowns	Reid Sinnett (United States)	QB	Madrid Bravos	12	50
Completions	Reid Sinnett (United States)	QB	Madrid Bravos	12	289
Completion percentage	Reid Sinnett (United States)	QB	Madrid Bravos	12	72.98%
Rushing
Yards	Justin Rodney (United States)	RB	Munich Ravens	11	1082
Touchdowns	Lukas Waslwanter (Austria)	RB	Raiders Tirol	14	12
Yards per attempt	Jason Bofunda (France)	RB	Paris Musketeers	4	7.35
Receiving
Yards	Aron Cruickshank (United States)	WR	Madrid Bravos	12	1729
Touchdowns	Aron Cruickshank (United States)	WR	Madrid Bravos	12	20
Receptions	Aron Cruickshank (United States)	WR	Madrid Bravos	12	122
Yards per reception	Stéphane Fortes (France)	WR	Paris Musketeers	11	22.14
Defensive
Sacks	Kyle Kitchens (United States)	DE	Hamburg Sea Devils	12	12
Tackles	A.J. Wentland (Serbia)	LB	Panthers Wrocław	12	144
Interceptions	Lautaro Frecha (Argentina)	SS	Prague Lions	10	5
Kicking
FG	Timo Bronn (Germany)	K	Stuttgart Surge	12	14
FG Pct	Cameron Gillis (Canada)	K	Fehérvár Enthroners	12	81.82
PAT	Álvaro Peñas (Spain)	K	Madrid Bravos	12	51
PAT Pct	Eric Schlomm (Germany)	K	Hamburg Sea Devils	12	95.00

== League Awards ==
=== Individual Awards ===
The league honors were announced during the 2025 ELF Championship Game.

Award	Winner	Team	Reason	Ref.
Most Valuable Player	(United States) Reid Sinnett	Madrid Bravos	3,953 passing yards, 50 passing touchdowns, 72.98 pass percentage, 139.9 QBR- all single-season league records	
Coach of the Year	(United States) Kendral Ellison	Munich Ravens	Led team to first division title	
Man of the Year	(Austria) Noel Swancar	Vienna Vikings	Coaches Vienna youth teams; served as ambassador for Lichtblickhof, a children's hospice for children with serious and life-shortening diseases, disabilities, or traumatic experiences	
Assistant Coach of the Year	(Germany) Johannes Brenner (United States) Cody Pastorino	Stuttgart Surge	Surge defense finishes second in points per game, fifth in passing defense, and second in rushing defense	
Offensive Lineman of the Year	(Australia) Brendan Oswin	Madrid Bravos	Integral to Madrid's recond-breaking passing attack	
Comeback Player of the Year	(United States) Jon Cole	Fehérvár Enthroners	101 receptions, 1,147 receiving yards, 914 return yards, and 12 touchdowns after missing most of 2024 season	
Homegrown of the Year	(Serbia) Alexsandar Borkovic	Fehérvár Enthroners	130 tackles, 7 tackles for loss, 1 interception, 8 pass deflections	
Offensive Player of the Year	(United States) Aron Cruickshank	Madrid Bravos	Set ELF single-season records for receptions, receiving yards, and receiving touchdowns	
Defensive Player of the Year	(United States) AJ Wentland	Panthers Wrocław	144 tackles, 7 tackles for loss, 2 forced fumbles	
Special Teams Player of the Year	(United States) Devan Burrell	Helvetic Mercenaries	1,514 return yards, 3 return touchdowns	
Rookie of the Year	(Germany) Tyler Foster	Berlin Thunder	64 receptions, 824 receiving yards, 7 touchdowns	
Defensive Rookie of the Year	(United Kingdom) Arthur Kingdom	Prague Lions	85 tackles, 5.5 tackles for loss, 2.5 sacks, 1 forced fumble	

== Notable players ==
Players who played in the European League of Football in 2025

=== Quarterbacks ===
- Ben Holmes (United States) – (Vienna)
- DJ Irons (United States) – (Wrocław)
- Chad Jeffries (United States) – (Rhein)
- Matthew McKay (United States) – (Frankfurt)
- Conor Miller (United States) – (Raiders)
- N'Kosi Perry (United States) – (Raiders)
- Reid Sinnett (United States) – (Madrid)
- Jakeb Sullivan (United States) – (Berlin)
- Taulia Tagovailoa (United States) – (Hamburg)

=== Other positions ===
- Jordan Bouah (Italy) – WR – (Rhein)
- Anthony Dablé (France) – WR – (Paris)
- Moubarak Djeri (Germany) – DL – (Frankfurt)
- Aaron Donkor (Germany) – LB – (Vienna)
- Ja'Len Embry (United States) – DB – (Prague)
- Jordan Genmark Heath (Sweden) – RB/LB – (Nordic)
- Valentin Gnahoua (France) – DL – (Paris)
- Reece Horn (United States) – WR – (Vienna)
- Kyle Kitchens (United States) – DE – (Hamburg)
- Jamalcolm Liggins (United States) – DB – (Paris)
- Anthony Mahoungou (France) – WR – (Paris)
- Chris Mulumba (Finland) – DL – (Stuttgart)
- Steven Nielsen (Denmark) – OL – (Frankfurt)
- Sandro Platzgummer (Austria) – RB – (Frankfurt)
- Thomas Schaffer (Austria) – DL – (Vienna)
- Malik Stanley (United States) – WR – (Munich)
- Raheem Wilson (United States) – DB – (Stuttgart)
