= 2025 Munich Ravens season =

German American football team season

- Owner: Thomas Krohne
- Head coach: Kendral Ellison
- Offensive coordinator: Kyle Callahan
- Defensive coordinator: Kendral Ellison
- Home stadium: Sportpark Unterhaching

Results
- Record: 11-1
- Division place: 1 (South division)
- Playoffs: Lost Semi final vs. Stuttgart Surge 13-27

The 2025 Munich Ravens season was the third season of the Munich Ravens in the fifth season of the European League of Football (ELF). The Ravens won South division and lost in the semi final against Stuttgart Surge, who won the ELF championship in the end.

== Preseason ==
Former quarterback Chad Jeffries left the Ravens to join league rival Rhein Fire. The Ravens announced Russell Tabor as quarterback starter for 2025. The 21-year-old from University of North Carolina came from Osos Rivas in Spain. General Manager Sebastian Stolz left the Ravens.

== Regular season ==
As season opener Munich hosted the Raiders Tirol. The Ravens won with 20-7. A week later the Ravens hosted Berlin Thunder and continued building momentum with a 38-16 win. After a bye week, the Ravens had their first away game in Stuttgart, which they lost against Surge 28-36.

Throughout regular season Munich consistently performed at a high level, averaging 36.3 points per game, ranking among the top offenses in the European League of Football. In a dramatic early-July game, Ravens beat the Madrid Bravos 43–40. On August 10, 2025, the Ravens defeated the Madrid Bravos 30-27 in a close contest, helping secure the South Division lead and a direct playoff spot. The Ravens finished with an 11-1 record.

=== Standings ===
South Division
| Pos | Team | GP | W | L | DIV | PF | PA | DIFF | STK | Qualification |
|---|---|---|---|---|---|---|---|---|---|---|
| 1 | Munich Ravens | 12 | 11 | 1 | 6–0 | 436 | 269 | +167 | W9 | Automatic playoffs (#2) |
| 2 | Madrid Bravos | 12 | 8 | 4 | 3–3 | 507 | 297 | +210 | W1 | Advance to playoffs (#6) |
| 3 | Raiders Tirol | 12 | 6 | 6 | 3–3 | 417 | 300 | +117 | W1 | |
| 4 | Helvetic Mercenaries | 12 | 0 | 12 | 0–6 | 137 | 647 | –510 | L12 | |

Source: europeanleague.football

=== Schedule ===
| Week | Date | Opponent | Result | Record | Venue | Att. | Recap |
| 1 | May 18 | Raiders Tirol | 20–7 | 1–0 | Sportpark Unterhaching | 3395 | |
| 2 | May 25 | Berlin Thunder | 38–16 | 2–0 | Sportpark Unterhaching | 2755 | |
| 3 | bye | | | | | | |
| 4 | June 8 | at Stuttgart Surge | 28–36 | 2–1 | Gazi-Stadion auf der Waldau, Stuttgart | 3213 | |
| 5 | June 15 | Helvetic Mercenaries | 58–14 | 3–1 | Sportpark Unterhaching | 2425 | |
| 6 | June 22 | at Berlin Thunder | 35–12 | 4–1 | Preussenstadion, Berlin | 483 | |
| 7 | June 29 | Stuttgart Surge | 36–33 | 5–1 | Sportpark Unterhaching | 3347 | |
| 8 | July 5 | at Madrid Bravos | 43–40 | 6–1 | Estadio de Vallehermoso, Madrid | 3064 | |
| 9 | July 12 | at Helvetic Mercenaries | 34–20 | 7–1 | Lidl Arena, Wil | 1124 | |
| 10 | July 19 | at Raiders Tirol | 31–24 | 8–1 | Tivoli Stadion Tirol, Innsbruck | 3724 | |
| 11 | July 27 | Panthers Wrocław | 34–14 | 9–1 | Sportpark Unterhaching | 4191 | |
| 12 | bye | | | | | | |
| 13 | August 10 | Madrid Bravos | 30–27 | 10–1 | Sportpark Unterhaching | 4585 | |
| 14 | August 16 | at Panthers Wrocław | 49–26 | 11–1 | Stadion Olimpijski, Wrocław | | |

== Playoffs ==
Munich hosted Stuttgart Surge in the semifinal but lost 27-13, ending their title hopes. Surge went on to win the ELF Championship in September, defeating the Vienna Vikings.

| Round | Date | Opponent | Result | Venue | Att. | Recap |
|---|---|---|---|---|---|---|
| Semi Final | August 31 | Stuttgart Surge | 13-27 | Sportpark Unterhaching, Unterhaching | 6,072 | Recap |

== Roster ==
2025 Munich Ravens roster
| Quarterbacks: 7 (United States) Russell Tabor QB; 17 (Germany) Levin Adrom QB; Running backs: 5 (Germany) Simon Homadi RB; 26 (Germany) Benedikt Pohler RB; 33 (Germany) Justin Rodney RB; Wide receivers: 3 (United States) Malik Stanley WR; 6 (Germany) Jannik Nowak WR; 11 (Germany) Luca Salvo WR; 14 (Germany) Jason Sanders WR; 84 (Germany) Michael Stadler WR; Tight ends: 0 (Germany) Philip Okonkwo TE; 85 (Germany) Marlon Malki TE | Offensive linemen: 50 (Germany) Tobias Vorreiter OL; 53 (Germany) Dominik Ondra OL; 55 (United Kingdom) Chinazo Obobi OL; 57 (United Kingdom) Harry Sayer T; 70 (Germany) Philip Weinzierl OL; 72 (Germany) Simon Hugger OL; 75 (Germany) Tassilo Wagner OL; 78 (Germany) Roman Wahrheit OL; 79 (Germany) Gerrit Brandt OL; Defensive linemen: 8 (New Zealand) Etuale Lui DL; 15 (Germany) Johannes Zirngibl DE; 31 (Germany) Joseph Darkwa DL; 45 (Germany) Tizian Vogl DL; 51 (Germany) Jonas Schwaiger DL; 90 (Germany) Julius Richter DL; 91 (Germany) Leon Weber DE; 95 (Germany) Marius Bindl DL; 96 (Germany) Denis Butz DL; 99 (Germany) Hiswill Awuah DT | Linebackers: 1 (United States) Dexter Fitzpatrick LB; 9 (Germany) Kevin Titz LB; 29 (Germany) Felix Boy LB; 30 (Germany) Jan Bender LB; 35 (Germany) Jonas Maier LB; 44 (Germany) Luca Maier LB; 47 (Germany) Dominic Schmid LB; 48 (Germany) Lorenzo Deiana LB; 52 (France) Wael Nasri ILB; 54 (Germany) Thiago Lessow LB; 56 (Germany) Franz Tiefenbacher LB; Defensive backs: 2 (Austria) Christoph Nitzlnader CB; 4 (United States) Cole Coleman DB; 12 (Germany) Vincent Woywod DB; 21 (France) Jumilson Moreira Ferreira DB; 22 (Germany) Marcos Schlabitz DB; 23 (Germany) Jakob Mahler DB; 24 (Germany) Jonas Gürntke SS; 27 (Germany) Isaac M'Bra SS; 34 (Germany) Finn Bujok DB; 36 (Germany) Vincent Müller DB; 37 (Germany) Igor Bujok DB; 38 (Germany) Till Boedewadt DB; Special teams: 18 (Germany) Daniel Schweiger K/P | Reserve lists: 21 (Germany) Nico Leiderer DB; 13 (Germany) Marvin Rutsch WR; 32 (Germany) Moritz Hiller DB; Practice squad: 69 (Germany) Robin Still OL; 80 (Germany) Nick Stadler WR; 10 (Germany) Benjamin Perauer WR; 19 (Germany) Luca Lippert K/P; 28 (Germany) Eric Köhncke DB; 20 (Germany) Rachid Ali-Tagba RB; 59 (Germany) Laurin Frank LB; 46 (Germany) Jan-Philipp von Gültlingen DL; Rookies in italics Roster updated Aug 06, 2025; 4 A-import, 6 E-import, 47 homegrown 57 active, 11 practice squad |
