= 2025 Paris Musketeers season =

French American football team season

- President: (United States) John McKeon
- Head coach: (United States) Jack Del Rio
- Offensive coordinator: (United States) Luke Del Rio
- Home stadium: Stade Robert Bobin

The 2025 Paris Musketeers season is the third season of the Paris Musketeers team in the European League of Football for the 2025 season.

== Preseason ==
Initially head coach Marc Mattoli was extended for a third year with the franchise. However, in January 2025, he left the team to become the defensive coordinator for Kennesaw State, an American college football team. Former NFL head coach, Jack Del Rio, was hired on 17 January 2025, as the next head coach of the team.

On February 21, 2025, Paris signed quarterback Jaylon Henderson, who previously played for the German Bowl winner Potsdam Royals.

== Regular season ==
=== Standings ===
West Division
Pos	Team	GP	W	L	DIV	PF	PA	DIFF	STK	Qualification
1	Stuttgart Surge	12	10	2	5–1	517	193	+324	W6	Automatic playoffs (#3)
2	Paris Musketeers	12	7	5	4–2	459	177	+282	L1	
3	Frankfurt Galaxy	12	6	6	3–3	383	367	+16	L1	
4	Cologne Centurions	12	0	12	0–6	69	740	–671	L12	

Source: europeanleague.football

=== Schedule ===
Week	Date	Opponent (Note: Intra-Conference games are in italics)	Result	Record	Venue	Att.	Recap
1	May 17	Rhein Fire	15–17	0–1	Stade Robert Bobin		
2	May 25	Stuttgart Surge	6–0	1–1	Stade Robert Bobin		
3	June 1	at Frankfurt Galaxy	27–29	1–2	Stadion am Bieberer Berg, Offenbach		
4	June 8	at Rhein Fire	31–7	2–2	Schauinsland-Reisen-Arena, Duisburg		
5	bye						
6	June 22	Frankfurt Galaxy	35–16	3–2	Stade Robert Bobin		
7	June 29	at Cologne Centurions	62–0	4–2	Südstadion. Cologne		
8	July 6	at Helvetic Mercenaries	62–0	5–2	Lidl Arena, Wil		
9	July 13	Vienna Vikings	33–40	5–3	Stade Robert Bobin		
10	July 19	at Stuttgart Surge	8–26	5–4	Gazi-Stadion auf der Waldau, Stuttgart		
11	July 26	Cologne Centurions			Stade Robert Bobin		
12	bye						
13	August 9	Helvetic Mercenaries			Stade Robert Bobin		
14	August 16	at Vienna Vikings			Wiener Neustadt Arena, Wiener Neustadt		

Source: elfdata.eu

== Roster ==
Paris Musketeers roster
Quarterbacks: 8 (United States) Jaylon Henderson QB; Running backs: 28 (France) Jason Bofunda; 7 (France) Nicolas Khandar; 21 (France) Jean-Charles Moukouri; Wide receivers: 11 (France) Jefferson Alexandre; 84 (France) Noa Badibanga; 5 (France) Rémi Bertellin; 18 (France) Stéphane Fortes; 13 (France) Florian Larose; 85 (France) Sirac Kougnaglo; 6 (United States) Austin Mitchell; 1 (France) Anthony Mahoungou; 14 (France) Cheikhou Sow; 88 (France) Martin Teham; 12 (France) Hugo Tekedam; Tight ends: 89 (France) Liam Ward	Offensive linemen: 70 (France) Nyohor Badiane G; 65 (Italy) Jeremy Gasparro C; 78 (France) Max Gaye T; 70 (Norway) Jonas Hagerup T; 62 (France) Julien Kouakou T; 50 (France) Nabil Marzougui C; 76 (France) Elton Mendes T; 73 (France) Elyes Saoui G; 63 (United Kingdom) Lewis Thomas G; 75 (France) Laïc Vontie T; Defensive linemen: 17 (France) Randy Abandzounou DE; 15 (United States) Artis DeMarco DE; 99 (France) Willem Dendele DT; 90 (France) Valentin Gnahoua DE; 45 (France) Jaurés Goké DE; 58 (Samoa) Lance Leota DT; 43 (Australia) Jack Loew DT; 97 (France) Averdié Mizius DT; 44 (France) Stanley Zeregbe DE; 95 (Sweden) Aslan Zetterberg DE	Linebackers: 4 (France) Digaan Gomis MLB; 31 (France) Kadel King MLB; 41 (France) Davidson Larochel OLB; 33 (Spain) Oliver Obolela; 35 (France) Paul Véritas; Defensive backs: 27 (France) Maeric Achiepi SS; 20 (France) Jordy Adjetey CB; 24 (France) Jean Aubert CB; 26 (France) Jean-Alphonse Edris; 2 (France) Souleymane Karamoko FS; 3 (France) Amir Kilani SS; 0 (United States) Jamalcolm Liggins CB; 10 (France) Widmael Petion CB; 29 (France) Kevin Querido SS; 36 (France) Maxime Roger CB; 20 (France) Wadjihe Said CB; Special teams: 30 (France) Mathys Dupont K	Reserve lists: 72 (France) Wally Camara G; -- (France) Yanis Polin RB; Practice squad: 74 (France) Olivier Bordin T; 34 (France) Noe Geremias ILB; 19 (France) Sofiane Khezami LB; 25 (France) Fara Mendy FS; 81 (France) Kevin Mwamba TE; 59 (France) Bruno Ribeiro G; 28 (France) Judson Saint Louis Saintervil RB; 55 Mamadou Sy DT; 23 (France) Chris Voumbo RB; Rookies in italics Roster updated July 24, 2025; 4 A-import, 5 E-import, 44 homegrown 53 active, 9 practice squad
