= 2025 Stuttgart Surge season =

American football club in Germany season

- General manager: Suni Musa
- Head coach: Jordan Neuman
- Home stadium: Gazi-Stadion auf der Waldau

Results
- Record: 10–2
- Playoffs: Won Wildcard (vs. Madrid Bravos) 41–17; Won Semi final (@ Munich Ravens) 27–13; Won Championship Game (@ Vienna Vikings) 24–17

The 2025 Stuttgart Surge season is the fifth season of Stuttgart Surge in the European League of Football for American Football. The Surge finished the season with a 10–2 record and claimed the West Division title, securing a spot in the playoffs for the third consecutive year. In the playoffs, they reached the championship game for the second time. Facing the Vienna Vikings, they secured their first ELF title with a 24–17 victory.

== Regular season ==
Following the league's realignment into four divisions, the team was placed in the Division West together with Frankfurt Galaxy, the Paris Musketeers and the Cologne Centurions.

=== Schedule ===
Week	Date	Opponent (Note: Intra-Conference games are in italics)	Result	Record	Venue	Att.	Recap
1	May 18	Frankfurt Galaxy	33–20	1–0	Gazi-Stadion auf der Waldau	3,711	
2	May 25	at Paris Musketeers	0–6	1–1	Stade Robert Bobin, Bondoufle	1,454	
3	May 31	at Hamburg Sea Devils	53–14	2–1	Weserstadion, Bremen	5,750	
4	June 8	Munich Ravens	36–28	3–1	Gazi-Stadion auf der Waldau	3,213	
5	bye						
6	June 22	Cologne Centurions	88–7	4–1	Gazi-Stadion auf der Waldau	2,451	
7	June 29	at Munich Ravens	33–36	4–2	Sportpark Unterhaching, Unterhaching	3,347	
8	July 6	Fehérvár Enthroners	55–12	5–2	Gazi-Stadion auf der Waldau		
9	July 12	at Frankfurt Galaxy	54–39	6–2	PSD Bank Arena, Frankfurt am Main	6,077	
10	July 20	Paris Musketeers	26–8	7–2	Gazi-Stadion auf der Waldau		
11	July 27	Hamburg Sea Devils	48–0	8–2	Gazi-Stadion auf der Waldau		
12	bye						
13	August 9	at Cologne Centurions	44–3	9–2	Südstadion, Cologne		
14	August 16	at Fehérvár Enthroners	47–20	10–2	First Field, Székesfehérvár		

Source: elfdata.eu

=== Standings ===
West Division
Pos	Team	GP	W	L	DIV	PF	PA	DIFF	STK	Qualification
1	Stuttgart Surge	12	10	2	5–1	517	193	+324	W6	Automatic playoffs (#3)
2	Paris Musketeers	12	7	5	4–2	459	177	+282	L1	
3	Frankfurt Galaxy	12	6	6	3–3	383	367	+16	L1	
4	Cologne Centurions	12	0	12	0–6	69	740	–671	L12	

Source: europeanleague.football

== Postseason ==
=== Schedule ===
Round	Date	Opponent	Result	Record	Venue	Att.	Recap
Wildcard	August 23	Madrid Bravos	41–17	1–0	Gazi-Stadion auf der Waldau	2,500	Recap
Semi Final	August 31	@ Munich Ravens	27–13	2–0	Sportpark Unterhaching, Unterhaching		Recap
Championship Game	September 7	@ Vienna Vikings	24–17	3–0	MHPArena, Stuttgart	36,784	Recap

== Roster ==
Stuttgart Surge roster
Quarterbacks: 4 (United States) Reilly Hennessey; 16 (Germany) Lars Heidrich; Running backs: 0 (Republic of Ireland) Tomiwa Oyewo; 2 (Germany) Kai Hunter; 22 (Germany) Albert Wiesigstrauch; 35 (United States) Micah McCullough; 41 (Germany) Bryan Yankson; 43 (Germany) León Helm FB; Wide receivers: 3 (United States) Mike Harley Jr. (Note: Replacement for Jeff Cotton); 7 (Germany) Louis Geyer; 8 (Germany) Leonell Fritzen; 10 (Germany) Florian Lengauer; 11 (Germany) Emil Rabin; 14 (Germany) Timon Stüwe; 17 (United Kingdom) Daniel Pedro; 18 (Germany) Aurieus Minton; 81 (Germany) Jan Pietsch; Tight ends: 40 (Germany) Giacomo De Pauli; 80 (Germany) Philip Eichhorn; 85 (United States) Roberto Miranda	Offensive linemen: 50 (Germany) Marvin Biegert C; 55 (Italy) Alessandro Vergani G; 57 (Germany) Marlon Werthmann T; 61 (Germany) Luca Jokiel T; 66 (Germany) Sascha Beck C; 67 (Germany) Markos Dubravkic G; 69 (Germany) Emmanuel Häfele T; 72 (Germany) Tobias Braun T; 74 (Germany) Robert Hager T; 75 (Germany) Moritz Schreiber C; 76 (Germany) Lukas Maier G; 78 (Germany) Benhur Arya; Defensive linemen: 6 (Germany) Robert Lachmann DE; 13 (Finland) Chris Mulumba DE; 52 (Germany) Dominic Siegel DE; 54 (Germany) Alexander Kreß DE; 60 (Germany) Nathan Kalemba DT; 70 (Germany) Maximilian Dommermuth DT; 90 (Germany) Raphael Zistler DT; 91 (Germany) Sadik Busch DE; 92 (Germany) Simon Butsch DE; 94 (Germany) Berend Grube DE; 97 (Germany) Leander Strathmann DE	Linebackers: 25 (Germany) Luis Leatherman MLB; 26 (Germany) Luca Siebert MLB; 30 (Germany) Lenno Reinhardt OLB; 32 (Germany) Luis Bach; 39 (Germany) Enis Kaser OLB; 44 (Germany) Maleka Japhet Mbala MLB; 45 (Germany) Lukas Levin MLB; 47 (Germany) Nikolas Knoblauch MLB; 49 (Germany) Felix Födinger OLB; 51 (Germany) Omar Dittrich MLB; Defensive backs: 5 (Germany) Konstantin Katz FS; 9 (Germany) Lasse Engel FS; 12 (United States) Raheem Wilson CB; 20 (Germany) Sarrow Drammeh CB; 21 (Germany) Julian Jakob CB; 23 (Italy) Giuseppe Della Vecchia CB; 24 (United States) Mitchel Fettig CB; 27 (Croatia) Marko Vidačković FS; 28 (Germany) Thiago Siebert CB; 29 (Germany) Julian Ludwig-Mayorga; 31 (Germany) Nick Wenzelburger S; 33 (Germany) Ben Wenzler CB; Special teams: 38 (Germany) Timo Bronn	Rookies in italics Roster updated 2 June 2025; 5 A-import, 5 E-import, 56 homegrown 66 active
