= London Guard =

American football team based in England

Logo

General information
- Founded: 11 August 2026; 2 months ago
- Stadium: BetWright Stadium
- Headquartered: Leyton, London, England
- Colors: Scarlet, white, black
- Website: www.londonguard.com

Personnel
- Owner: David Gandler
- General manager: William Elegeti
- Head coach: Andrew Weidinger

League / conference affiliations
- European Football Alliance

The London Guard is an American football club based in Leyton, London, England. The club will compete in the European Football Alliance beginning in 2027.

== History ==
In March 2025, The Guardian reported that Gandler Sports Group (GSG), which at that time took over English third-league football team Leyton Orient, also wanted to establish an American football team, which should play in Leyton's home stadium. In November 2025, the European Football Alliance (EFA) confirmed the accession of a London franchise, start playing in 2027.

The team's name and logo were unveiled on 11 August 2026. Retired British-Nigerian defensive end Efe Obada was announced as club ambassador. William Elgeti is general manager.

Andrew Weidinger was announced as head coach for the 2027 season on 23 August 2026. Tim Lewis was later appointed as defensive coordinator on 9 October 2026.

== Stadium ==
The London Guard will play at Brisbane Road (currently known as BetWright Stadium for sponsorship purposes). The stadium is also home of Leyton Orient F.C., with whom the Guard share an ownership group. It has a capacity of 9,271.

== Colors and logos ==
The Guard's logo incorporates a simple battlement above a stylized portcullis, possibly inspired by the badge of the 1st Battalion London Guards. The team colors are red, white, and black.

== Staff ==
Head coach

- Head coach – Andrew Weidinger

Offensive coaches

- Offensive coordinator – Andrew Weidinger
- Offensive line – Wade Harman

Defensive coaches

- Defensive coordinator – Tim Lewis
- Defensive Line – Jay Hayes
