= Wade Harman =

American football coach (born 1963)

Personal information
- Born: October 1, 1963 (age 63); Corydon, Iowa, U.S.

Career information
- College: Drake; Utah State

Career history
- Utah State (1987) Graduate assistant; Utah State (1988–1991) Running backs coach & tights ends coach; Pacific (CA) (1992–1995) Running backs coach & wide receivers coach; Morningside (1996) Offensive coordinator & offensive line coach; Minnesota Vikings (1997–1998) Coaching assistant; Baltimore Ravens (1999–2007) Tight ends coach & assistant offensive line coach; Baltimore Ravens (2008–2013) Tight ends coach; Atlanta Falcons (2014) Assistant offensive line coach; Atlanta Falcons (2015–2018) Tight ends coach; Denver Broncos (2019–2021) Tight ends coach; Miami Dolphins (2023) Senior assistant; Madrid Bravos (2025) Offensive line coach

Awards and highlights
- 2× Super Bowl champion (XXXV, XLVII)

Wade Harman (born October 1, 1963) is an American football coach. Harman used to be the assistant offensive line coach for the Atlanta Falcons, working with veteran offensive line coach Mike Tice.

== Professional coaching career ==
Before being hired by the Falcons, Harman spent most of his career as a tight end coach for the Baltimore Ravens. He was fired on January 27, 2014. Harman began his NFL coaching career with the Minnesota Vikings. Until his dismissal, Harman was the longest tenured coach in the Baltimore Ravens organization, and the only coach remaining in the organization from the Super Bowl XXXV team.

=== Minnesota Vikings ===
==== 1997 season ====
Harman began his coaching career with a one-year contract as a coaches assistant for the Minnesota Vikings. In his first year with the Vikings, the team went 9–7 in the regular season, winning a Wild Card berth in the playoffs, before losing the divisional round to the San Francisco 49ers.

==== 1998 season ====
Harman was given a one-year contract extension at the end of the 1997 season, and returned to the Vikings in 1998. The Vikings went 15–1 this year, but lost to the Atlanta Falcons in the NFC Conference Championship, becoming the first 15–1 team to not reach the Super Bowl.

=== Baltimore Ravens ===
==== 1999 season ====
Harman was not re-signed by the Vikings following the 1998 season, and was picked up by the Baltimore Ravens as a tight ends coach.

==== Shannon Sharpe (2000–2001) and Super Bowl XXXV ====
From 2000 to 2001, Harman's main role was coaching tight end Shannon Sharpe. In 2000, Sharpe achieved the longest touchdown pass in NFL history in the AFC Conference Championship. The Ravens would go on to win Super Bowl XXXV. The next year, Sharpe would become the All Time NFL leader in Passes Caught by a Tight End and would earn a spot in the Pro Bowl.

=== Todd Heap (2002–2010) ===
Sharpe left the Ravens organization following the 2001 season, and Harman was called upon to prepare tight end Todd Heap to take over the starting tight end position. Heap was the leading receiver on the Ravens that year, with 836 yards. Heap was selected for the 2002 and 2003 Pro Bowl teams. Harman continued to coach Heap until the end of the 2010 season, when he signed with the Arizona Cardinals.

==== 2010–2013 seasons and Super Bowl XLVII ====
Harman was in charge of coaching Ravens 2010 draft picks Dennis Pitta and Ed Dickson. Harman was a part of the Ravens staff during their Super Bowl XLVII win.

=== Atlanta Falcons ===
==== 2014 season ====
Harman was hired on February 6, 2014, as an assistant offensive line coach. Harman, who worked alongside offensive line coach Mike Tice, helped stabilize a line that lost several starters during the year because of injuries.

==== 2015 season ====
On January 25, 2015, Harman was named the tight ends coach for the Atlanta Falcons. He helped makeover the tight end position that the previous year saw a major drop-off in productivity following the retirement of Tony Gonzalez.

==== 2016 season ====
In the 2016 season, Harman and the Falcons reached Super Bowl LI, where they faced the New England Patriots on February 5, 2017. In the Super Bowl, the Falcons fell in a 34–28 overtime defeat.

=== Denver Broncos ===
On January 17, 2019, the Denver Broncos announced that they hired Harman to be their tight ends coach.
