= Chad Jeffries =

American football player (born 1992)

No. 1 – Vienna Knights
- Position: Quarterback

Personal information
- Born: December 25, 1992 (age 33); Glendora, California, U.S.
- Listed height: 6 ft 2 in (1.88 m)
- Listed weight: 200 lb (91 kg)

Career information
- High school: Glendora
- College: San Diego State (2011–2013); Azusa Pacific (2014–2016)
- NFL draft: 2017: undrafted

Career history
- Marburg Mercenaries (2017); Danube Dragons (2018–2022); Munich Ravens (2023–2024); Rhein Fire (2025); Vienna Knights (2026–present)

Chad Jeffries (born December 25, 1992) is an American football quarterback for the Vienna Knights of the Austrian Football League (AFL). From 2018 to 2022, he played for the Danube Dragons in the Austrian Football League and won the Austrian Bowl with them in 2022. He was signed by the Munich Ravens in the European League of Football for the 2023 season.

== College career ==
Jeffries was a four-year quarterback at Glendora High School. Jeffries was at San Diego State from 2012 to 2013, but was not used. From 2014 to 2016, he played for the Azusa Pacific Cougars. The team won the Great Northwest Athletic Conference (NCAA Division II) title in a perfect season in 2016 and was named All-GNAC Honorable Mention. In 29 games for the Cougars, Jeffries made 272 throws for 3,862 yards on 482 attempts, including 27 for touchdowns. 11 throws were intercepted. He rushed for 1,042 yards on 242 carries, including 10 touchdowns.

== Professional career ==
For the 2017 season, Jeffries was signed by the Marburg Mercenaries in the German Football League. He threw for 3,045 yards and 28 touchdowns in 11 games and also ran for 305 yards, including three touchdowns.

After the season, Jeffries moved to Vienna to the Danube Dragons in the Austrian Football League. He played there for four seasons (the 2020 season was omitted). In the 2018 season he was the second-best quarterback in passing yards statistics with 3,173, and in 2019, he led the league in this statistic.

In the 2022 season, he won the Austrian Bowl with the Dragons in a perfect season and was named league MVP himself.

For the 2023 season, he was signed by the newly founded Munich Ravens in the European League of Football and ended the season as the second best quarterback in the league according to individual statistics. In November of the same year, he received a contract extension from the Ravens for the following season.

On December 1, 2024, Jeffries signed to play for the Rhein Fire.

On October 31, 2025, Jeffries signed with the Vienna Knights of the Austrian Football League.

== Season statistics ==
Year	Team	Games	Passing game							Running game			
Year	Team	Games	Cmp	Att	Rte	Yds	Avg	TD	Int	Att	Yds	Avg	TD
College Football
2014	Azusa Pacific Cougars	11	126	205	61.5	1,606	12.7	11	4	135	676	5.0	6
2015	Azusa Pacific Cougars	8	101	190	53.2	1,473	14.6	7	6	86	300	3.5	4
2016	Azusa Pacific Cougars	10	45	87	51.7	783	17.4	9	1	21	66	3.1	0
College total		29	272	482	56.4	3,862	14.2	27	11	242	1042	4.3	10
German Football League
2017	Marburg Mercenaries	11	232	404	57.4	3,045	13.1	28	12	106	305	2.9	3
GFL total		11	232	404	57.4	3,045	13.1	28	12	106	305	2.9	3
Austrian Football League
2018	Danube Dragons	12	226	363	62.3	3,173	14.8	24	6	86	464	5.4	3
2019	Danube Dragons	12	191	312	61.2	2,823	14.0	32	1	98	663	6.8	4
2020	Danube Dragons	No games (COVID-19 pandemic)											
2021	Danube Dragons	12	114	211	54.0	1,612	14.1	18	7	34	175	5.1	0
2022	Danube Dragons	12	159	254	62.6	2,852	17.9	33	4	58	196	3.4	7
2026	Vienna Knights	add.	add.	add.	add.	add.	add.	add.	add.	add.	add.	add.	add.
AFL total		48	690	1.140	60.5	10,460	15.2	107	18	276	1.498	5.4	14
European League of Football
2023	Munich Ravens	12	285	408	69.9	3,535	12.4	30	5	66	363	5.5	2
2024	Munich Ravens	12	225	331	68.0	2,888	12.8	35	6	83	337	4.1	10
2025	Rhein Fire	13	214	325	65.8	2,612	12.2	28	4	84	371	4.4	4
ELF total		37	724	1,064	67.9	9,035	12.5	93	15	233	1,071	4.7	16
Sources: athletics.apu.edu, stats.gfl.info, archive.football.at, live.football.at, https://europeanleague.football/players/8722b970-ad67-11ed-a5c1-13f8c0fe6ac6, https://elfpedia.eu/ELF_Rushing_Stats#ELF_2025_Regular_Season_Rushing,
