= Andrew Weidinger =

American football coach (born 1982)

Personal information
- Born: July 10, 1982 (age 44); Phoenix, Arizona

Career information
- High school: Thunderbird High School
- College: University of Arizona

Career history
- University of Arizona (2000–2006) Graduate Assistant; Atlanta Falcons (2007–2014) Offensive Assistant; Tampa Bay Buccaneers (2015–2018) Assistant Wide Receivers Coach/Game Management; Arizona Hotshots (2019) Running Backs; Potsdam Royals (2021) Offensive coordinator; Barcelona Dragons (2022) Head coach; Rhein Fire (2023–2024) Offensive coordinator; Madrid Bravos (2025) Head coach; London Guard (2027) Head coach

Awards and highlights
- ELF champion (2023, 2024); ELF Head Coach of the Year (2022); ELF Assistant Coach of the Year (2023)

Andrew Weidinger (born July 10, 1982) is an American football coach who is currently the head coach of the London Guard in the European Football Alliance. Weidinger last coached in Europe as the head coach of the Madrid Bravos in the European League of Football (ELF). Weidinger joined the Bravos after serving two seasons as the offensive coordinator for the Rhein Fire in 2023-2024 and one as head coach of the Barcelona Dragons in 2022. Weidinger won back-to-back championships with the Fire and led the Barcelona Dragons to an 8–4 record and their first ever playoff appearance. Weidinger was named the 2022 ELF Coach of the Year for his work with the Dragons and 2023 ELF Assistant Coach of the Year for his work in Rhein. He previously coached for the Atlanta Falcons and Tampa Bay Buccaneers of the National Football League, the Arizona Hotshots of the now defunct Alliance of American Football and The University of Arizona.

== College coaching ==
Weidinger began his football and coaching career in 2000 when he enrolled at the University of Arizona. There he worked as a student assistant and later a graduate assistant on defense. At the end of his college career he was assistant director of football operations with a focus on recruiting and scouting.

== Professional coaching ==
=== Atlanta Falcons ===
In 2006 Weidinger had a pre-season internship with the Atlanta Falcons where he assisted in scouting and evaluating of potential players throughout the NFL. In 2008 he was hired as assistant to the head coach under Mike Smith. In the 2012 season he was promoted to offensive assistant. He stayed with the Falcons until 2014.

=== Tampa Bay Buccaneers ===
For the 2015 season Weidinger was hired by the Tampa Bay Buccaneers as an offensive quality control coach. There he reunited with former Falcons OC Dirk Koetter who was the OC and head coach for the Bucs. One year later he was promoted to assistant wide receivers coach and was assigned to game management. Weidinger left the franchise following the conclusion of the 2018 season.

=== Arizona Hotshots ===
In 2019 Weidinger served as the running backs coach for the Arizona Hotshots of the Alliance of American Football. When the league folded mid-season the Hotshots held a record of 5-3 and all three of their RB's were in the Top 11 of the league leaders in rushing.

== European coaching ==
=== Potsdam Royals ===
In March of 2021 Weidinger was named the offensive coordinator of the Potsdam Royals in the German Football League. The Royals finished the season 7-3, losing to the Schwäbisch Hall Unicorns in the Semi-Finals.

=== Barcelona Dragons ===
Weidinger was announced as the head coach of the Barcelona Dragons of the European League of Football in March of 2022. The Dragons had recorded a record of 3-7 in 2021 but improved to 8-4, winning more games than they would in their other three seasons combined, earning Weidinger 2022 Coach of the Year honors. They reached the playoffs, where they were eliminated by the Vienna Vikings in the semifinals. On September 13, 2022, the team announced that they had parted ways.

=== Rhein Fire ===
Weidinger was announced as the offensive coordinator for the Rhein Fire of the European League of Football on September 27, 2022. The Fire finished the regular season unscathed at 12-0. They remained unbeaten in the playoffs, overcoming the Stuttgart Surge 53-34 in the championship game to become the first undefeated champions in ELF history.

In his first season with the Fire, Weidinger's offense led the league in Points, Total Yards, Passing Yards, Touchdowns, Passing Touchdowns and 3rd Down Conversions. Rhein Fire QB Jadrian Clark earned recognition as the ELF MVP after throwing for 3586 yards with 53 TDs to 14 different players. The performance of his unit earned Weidinger recognition from the league, as well, this time as the Assistant Coach of the Year.

Weidinger remained the offensive coordinator in Rhein for the 2024 ELF season. The team lead the league in Rushing Yards and Rushing Touchdowns while ranking 3rd in Total Points, Touchdowns and 3rd Down Conversions. The Rhein Fire had a record of 11-1 in the regular season en route to a second consecutive ELF Championship, beating the Vienna Vikings 51-20 in front of 41,364 fans at Veltins-Arena in Gelsenkirchen, Germany. Fire RB Glen Toonga walked away with ELF MVP honors rushing for 1936 yards and 34 TDs on 318 carries during the regular season. Toonga remains the only European-born player to win league MVP honors.

=== Madrid Bravos ===
On October 1, 2024, Weidinger became the head coach of the Madrid Bravos.

During the 2025 season Weidinger’s Bravos went 8-4, losing in the first round of the playoffs to the eventual champion Stuttgart Surge. The Bravos offense led the league in total yards and passing yards while finishing second in points scored.

The QB tandem of Reid Sinnett and Ivan López set the ELF record for passing yards in a season, racking up 4169 in 12 games. For his efforts, Sinnett was named the league MVP, Weidinger’s third player to walk away with the award in four seasons. The American QB completed 73.7% of his passes and threw for a league record 3953 yards and 50 TDs against only 4 INTs.

The Bravos leading receiver, Aron Cruickshank, set league records for receptions (122), yards (1729) and receiving TDs (20) in a single season on his way to being named the league’s Offensive Player of the Year.

Two other Bravos won league honors with German RB Justus Seelig earning Offensive Rookie of the Year honors and Australian OL Brendan Oswin winning Offensive Lineman of the Year.

On September 10, 2025 it was announced that Weidinger was stepping away from coaching and would not return to the Bravos.

=== London Guard ===
On August 23, 2026, Weidinger was announced as the head coach of the London Guard.
