= Madrid Bravos =

European American football team

Uniforms

General information
- Founded: September 26, 2023
- Folded: March 10, 2026
- Headquartered: Madrid, Spain
- Colors: Black, Red, Merlin, Gold
- madridbravos.com

Personnel
- General manager: Jaime Martín Lostao

Team history
- Madrid Bravos (2024–2025)

Home fields
- Estadio de Vallehermoso (2024–2025)

League / conference affiliations
- European League of Football (2024–2025): Western Conference (2024); South Division (2025)

Playoff appearances (2)
- 2024, 2025

The Madrid Bravos were an American football team based in Madrid, Spain. The team played in the 2024 and 2025 season in the European League of Football.

== History ==
Madrid was announced as expansion city on 19 May 2023. It is thus the second location in Spain next to the Barcelona Dragons, who have been playing in the ELF since 2021. The name and logo of the new franchise were presented on September 26, 2023.

The team is organized by Marlos Sports 2022 SL. General Manager is Jaime Martín Lostao. The teams from the Madrid area in the highest Spanish league LNFA - Las Rozas Black Demons, Madrid Osos Rivas and Coslada Camioneros - announced a cooperation with the new franchise.

In its two first seasons, the club played in the European League of Football, qualifying for the play-offs in both of its seasons, and in both times was eliminated in the wild card game. in 2025, Bravos' quarterback Reid Sinnett was named Most Valuable Player, setting single-season league records for passing yards, passing touchdowns, pass percentage, and passer rating.

On 9 September 2025 Madrid Bravos announced the club would not play the next ELF season as the club would join teams the newly created European Football Alliance. However, on 10 March 2026, the ownership declared that the team will not take part in the 2026 season.

== Statistics and records ==
=== Season-by-season record ===
Season	League	Team	Head coach	Regular season				Postseason				Average Attendance
Season	League	Team	Head coach	GP	W	L	Pos.	GP	W	L	Result	Average Attendance
2024	ELF	2024	Rip Scherer	12	8	4	6th (3rd Western)	1	0	1	Lost wildcard	1,393
2025	ELF	2025	Andrew Weidinger	12	8	4	6th (2nd Southern)	1	0	1	Lost wildcard	3,145

=== Franchise matchup history ===
Team	Record	Pct.	Home		Away	
Team	Record	Pct.	Record	Pct.	Record	Pct.
(Spain) Barcelona Dragons	2–0	1.000	1–0	1.000	1–0	1.000
(Germany) Cologne Centurions	2–0	1.000	1–0	1.000	1–0	1.000
(Hungary) Fehérvár Enthroners	2–0	1.000	1–0	1.000	1–0	1.000
(Germany) Frankfurt Galaxy	2–2	.500	1–1	.500	1–1	.500
(Germany) Hamburg Sea Devils	4–0	1.000	2–0	1.000	2–0	1.000
(Switzerland) Helvetic Mercenaries	2–0	1.000	1–0	1.000	1–0	1.000
(Germany) Munich Ravens	0–2	.000	0–1	.000	0–1	.000
(Denmark) Nordic Storm	0–0	–	0–0	–		
(France) Paris Musketeers	0–2	.000	0–1	.000	0–1	.000
(Czech Republic) Prague Lions	0–0	–	0–0	–		
(Austria) Raiders Tirol	1–1	.500	1–0	1.000	0–1	.000
(Germany) Rhein Fire	1–2	.333	0–1	.000	1–1	.500
(Germany) Stuttgart Surge	0–1	.000	–	–	0–1	.000
Total	16–10	.615	8–4	.667	8–6	.571

- Defunct teams in light gray.

=== Attendances ===
Season	Total	High	Low	Average
2024	8,360	2,071	954	1,393
2025	18,869	3,559	2,281	3,145

=== Top 5 attendances ===
Date	Rival	Att.
26 July 2025	Raiders Tirol	3,559
24 May 2025	Frankfurt Galaxy	3,530
17 May 2025	Hamburg Sea Devils	3,366
12 July 2025	Fehérvár Enthroners	3,069
5 July 2025	Munich Ravens	3,064

== Honors ==
=== Players ===
Honor	Player Name	Season
ELF Most Valuable Player	(United States) Reid Sinnett	2025
ELF Offensive Lineman of the Year	(Australia) Brendan Oswin	2025
ELF Offensive Player of the Year	(United States) Aron Cruickshank	2025
