= Rip Scherer =

American football player and coach (born 1952)

Current position
- Title: Consultant to Head Coach
- Team: UAB
- Conference: American

Biographical details
- Born: August 3, 1952 (age 74); Pittsburgh, Pennsylvania, U.S.

Playing career
- 1970–1973: William & Mary
- Position: Quarterback

Coaching career (HC unless noted)
- 1974–1975: Penn State (GA)
- 1976: NC State (QB)
- 1977–1978: Hawaii (RB)
- 1979: Virginia (QB)
- 1980–1986: Georgia Tech (QB/OC)
- 1987: Alabama (OC)
- 1988–1990: Arizona (Recruiting Coordinator in 1988 & OC in 89 and 90)
- 1991–1994: James Madison
- 1995–2000: Memphis
- 2001: Kansas (co-OC)
- 2003–2004: Southern Miss (OC)
- 2005–2008: Cleveland Browns (assistant HC / QB)
- 2009–2010: Carolina Panthers (QB)
- 2011–2012: Colorado (assistant HC / QB)
- 2016–2017: UCLA (TE)
- 2018–2020: Los Angeles Chargers (TE/QB)
- 2022: UConn (senior analyst)
- 2023: UAB (sr assistant/advisor to HC)
- 2024: Madrid Bravos
- 2026–present: UAB (consultant)

Administrative career (AD unless noted)
- 2013–2015: UCLA (associate athletic director for football)

Head coaching record
- Overall: 51–63 (college)
- Tournaments: 1–1 (NCAA D-I-AA playoffs)

Accomplishments and honors

Championships
- 1 Yankee Mid-Atlantic Division (1994)

William Bernard "Rip" Scherer Jr. (born August 3, 1952) is an American football coach. He is the Consultant to Head Coach for the UAB. Scherer served at the head football coach at James Madison University from 1991 to 1994 and the University of Memphis from 1995 to 2000, compiling a career college football head coaching record of 51–63. In 2018, he was named tight ends coach for the Los Angeles Chargers of the National Football League (NFL). In 2024, he will be Head Coach of the Madrid Bravos in the European League of Football.

Scherer is the cousin of Kevin Colbert, former Vice President of Football Operations for the Pittsburgh Steelers. He is the son of longtime Pittsburgh-area high school coach William "Rip" Scherer.

== Head coaching record ==
=== College ===
Year	Team	Overall	Conference	Standing	Bowl/playoffs	NCAA^{#}	TSN^{°}
James Madison Dukes (NCAA Division I-AA independent) (1992–1994)
1991	James Madison	9–4			L NCAA Division I-AA Quarterfinal	16	
1992	James Madison	4–7					
James Madison Dukes (Yankee Conference) (1993–1994)
1993	James Madison	6–5	4–4	3rd (Mid-Atlantic)			
1994	James Madison	10–3	6–2	T–1st (Mid-Atlantic)	L NCAA Division I-AA Quarterfinal		13
James Madison:		29–19	10–6				
Memphis Tigers (NCAA Division I-A independent) (1995)
1995	Memphis	3–8					
Memphis Tigers (Conference USA) (1996–2000)
1996	Memphis	4–7	2–3	T–3rd			
1997	Memphis	4–7	2–4	T–4th			
1998	Memphis	2–9	1–5	T–7th			
1999	Memphis	5–6	4–2	T–2nd			
2000	Memphis	4–7	2–5	T–7th			
Memphis:		22–44	11–19				
Total:		51–63					
National championship Conference title Conference division title or championship game berth
