= Reid Sinnett =

American football player (born 1997)

No. 7, 13
- Position: Quarterback

Personal information
- Born: February 5, 1997 (age 29); Johnston, Iowa, U.S.
- Listed height: 6 ft 4 in (1.93 m)
- Listed weight: 225 lb (102 kg)

Career information
- High school: Johnston
- College: San Diego
- NFL draft: 2020: undrafted

Career history
- Tampa Bay Buccaneers (2020)*; Miami Dolphins (2020–2021); Philadelphia Eagles (2021); Miami Dolphins (2022)*; San Antonio Brahmas (2023); Cincinnati Bengals (2023); San Antonio Brahmas (2024)*; Houston Roughnecks (2024); Madrid Bravos (2025)
- * Offseason or practice squad member only

Awards and highlights
- ELF MVP (2025); First-team All-PFL (2019)
- Stats at Pro Football Reference

Reid Sinnett (born February 5, 1997) is an American former professional football quarterback. He played college football for the San Diego Toreros.

== Early life ==
Sinnett grew up in Johnston, Iowa, and attended Johnston High School. As a senior, his only year as a starter, he passed for 2,202 yards and 16 touchdowns. Lightly recruited out of high school, Sinnett originally had an offer from Penn before a change in the coaching staff. He eventually decided to enroll at San Diego at the recommendation from a former Penn coach that he contact the team's offensive coordinator, Tanner Engstrand. He also received preferred walk-ons from Kansas, Harvard, Iowa State, Rhode Island, and Yale.

== College career ==
Sinnett redshirted his true freshman season. He spent the next three seasons as the backup to Anthony Lawrence, who became the all-time leading passer in Pioneer Football League history, and passed for a total of 316 yards with one touchdown pass on 24-of-48 passes during that span. Sinnett was named the Toreros starter going into his redshirt senior season. In his only season as a starter, Sinnett completed 66.9 percent of his passes for 3,528 yards, 32 touchdowns and 10 interceptions while rushing for 174 yards and six touchdowns and was named first-team All-PFL and a finalist for the Walter Payton Award. Following the end of his collegiate career Sinnett played in the NFLPA Collegiate Bowl and completed 9 of 16 passes for 93 yards in the game.

== Professional career ==
Pre-draft measurables
Height	Weight	Arm length	Hand span
6 ft 3 5/8 in (1.92 m)	229 lb (104 kg)	33 3/8 in (0.85 m)	10 3/8 in (0.26 m)
All values from Pro Day

=== Tampa Bay Buccaneers ===
Sinnett signed a contract that included $152,000 in guaranteed money with the Tampa Bay Buccaneers as an undrafted free agent on April 25, 2020. He was waived by the team during final roster cuts on September 5, and subsequently signed with the practice squad the next day. Sinnett was released by Tampa Bay on September 8.

=== Miami Dolphins (first stint) ===
Sinnett was signed to the Miami Dolphins practice squad on September 14, 2020. He was elevated to the active roster on November 28 and January 2, 2021, for the team's Weeks 12 and 17 games against the New York Jets and Buffalo Bills, and reverted to the practice squad after each game. He signed a reserve/future contract with the Dolphins on January 5, 2021.

On August 31, 2021, Sinnett was waived by the Dolphins and re-signed to the practice squad the next day. He was promoted to the active roster on September 25, 2021 after an injury to starter Tua Tagovailoa. He was waived on October 23.

=== Philadelphia Eagles ===
Sinnett was claimed off waivers by the Philadelphia Eagles on October 25, 2021. He did not appear in any games for the Eagles during the regular season.

On August 30, 2022, Sinnett was waived by the Eagles and signed to the practice squad the next day. He was released on September 7.

=== Miami Dolphins (second stint) ===
Sinnett was signed to the Miami Dolphins' practice squad on October 3, 2022, but was released on November 1.

=== San Antonio Brahmas (first stint) ===
On November 18, 2022, Sinnett was assigned to the San Antonio Brahmas of the XFL. He was placed on injured reserve after suffering a broken foot. He was released from his contract on July 29, 2023.

=== Cincinnati Bengals ===
On July 29, 2023, Sinnett signed with the Cincinnati Bengals due to Joe Burrow suffering a calf strain in training camp. He was waived on August 29. He would later be signed to the Bengals’ practice squad on September 22; after former practice squad quarterback Will Grier was signed to the active roster of the New England Patriots. On September 25, Sinnett was promoted to the active roster. He was waived on October 2.

=== San Antonio Brahmas (second stint) ===
On January 22, 2024, Sinnett re-signed with the Brahmas. He was subsequently waived by the team.

=== Houston Roughnecks ===
On January 24, 2024, Sinnett was claimed off waivers by the Houston Roughnecks. He was released on October 3.

=== Madrid Bravos ===
On October 29, 2024, Sinnett signed with the Madrid Bravos of the European League of Football. During the season, Sinnett threw for 3,953 yards and 50 touchdowns & was named league MVP. Sinnett announced his retirement from professional football on November 14, 2025.

== Career statistics ==
=== XFL/UFL ===
Year	Team	League	Games			Passing								Rushing			
Year	Team	League	GP	GS	Record	Cmp	Att	Pct	Yds	Avg	TD	Int	Rtg	Att	Yds	Avg	TD
2023	SA	XFL	4	1	0–1	13	19	68.4	97	5.1	1	1	76.0	1	10	10.0	0
2024	HOU	UFL	10	5	1–4	117	187	62.6	1,136	6.0	5	4	79.5	12	42	3.5	1
Career			14	6	1–5	130	206	63.1	1,233	5.9	6	5	77.7	13	52	4.0	1

=== ELF ===
Year	Team	Games			Passing								Rushing			
Year	Team	GP	GS	Record	Cmp	Att	Pct	Yds	Avg	TD	Int	Rtg	Att	Yds	Avg	TD
2025	Madrid	12	12	8–4	289	396	73.0	3,953	10.0	50	4	139.9	34	252	7.4	4

=== College ===
Season	Team	Games			Passing								Rushing			
Season	Team	GP	GS	Record	Cmp	Att	Pct	Yds	Y/A	TD	Int	Rtg	Att	Yds	Avg	TD
2015	San Diego	Redshirt														
2016	San Diego	12	0	—	10	17	58.8	181	10.6	0	1	136.5	10	23	2.3	0
2017	San Diego	10	0	—	11	24	45.8	101	4.2	1	2	78.3	14	41	2.9	1
2018	San Diego	11	0	—	3	7	42.9	34	4.9	0	0	83.7	6	30	5.0	0
2019	San Diego	12	12	9–3	117	187	66.9	3,528	9.4	32	10	168.8	63	174	2.8	6
Career		45	12	9–3	275	423	65.0	3,844	9.1	33	13	160.9	93	268	2.9	7
