= Preussen-Stadion an der Malteserstraße =

Football stadium in Berlin, Germany

Preussenstadion
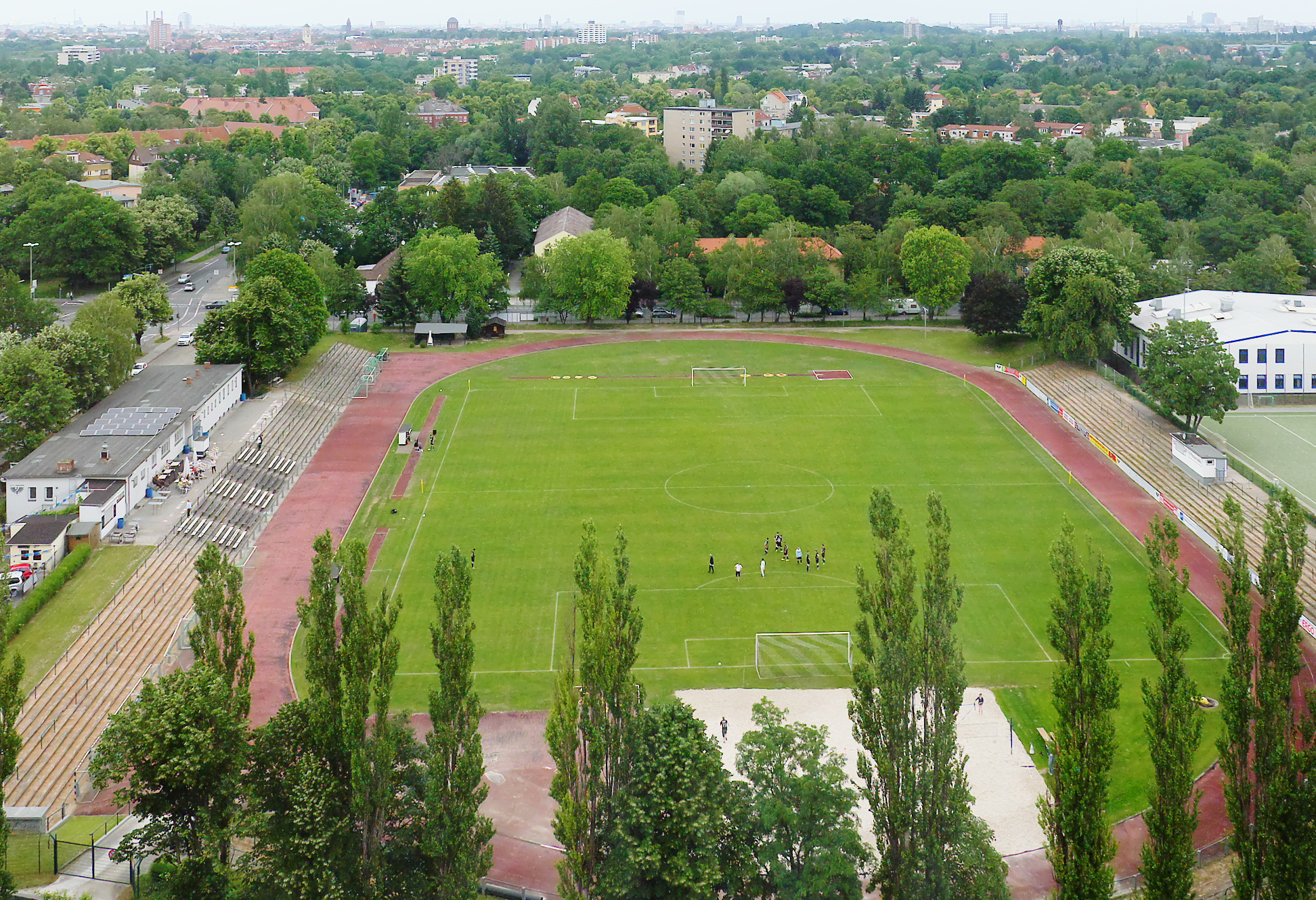
- Interactive map of Preussenstadion
- Full name: Preussen-Stadion an der Malteserstraße
- Location: Malteserstraße, Berlin, Federal Republic of Germany
- Coordinates: 52°25′57.5″N 13°21′17.4″E
- Capacity: 3,000 (200 seated)
- Surface: Natural Grass
- Field size: 74 x 98 metres

Construction
- Opened: 23 October 1938

Tenants
- Berliner Fußballclub Preussen; Berlin Thunder (since 2025)

The Preussenstadion is a football stadium in the Berlin district of Lankwitz (Steglitz-Zehlendorf). The football club BFC Preussen play their home games in the stadium, which has a capacity of 3,000 spectators, including 200 seats.

At the opening on 23 October 1938, the capacity was for 20,000 spectators, but the stadium was destroyed in the Second World War and was rebuilt gradually. From the originally built stadium, the concrete steps are preserved as the "oldest standing traverses of Berlin".

The stadium is located at Malteserstraße 24–36, at the corner of Kamenzer Damm, opposite the Lankwitz municipal park.
