= Wiener Neustadt Arena =

Association football stadium in Wiener Neustadt, Austria

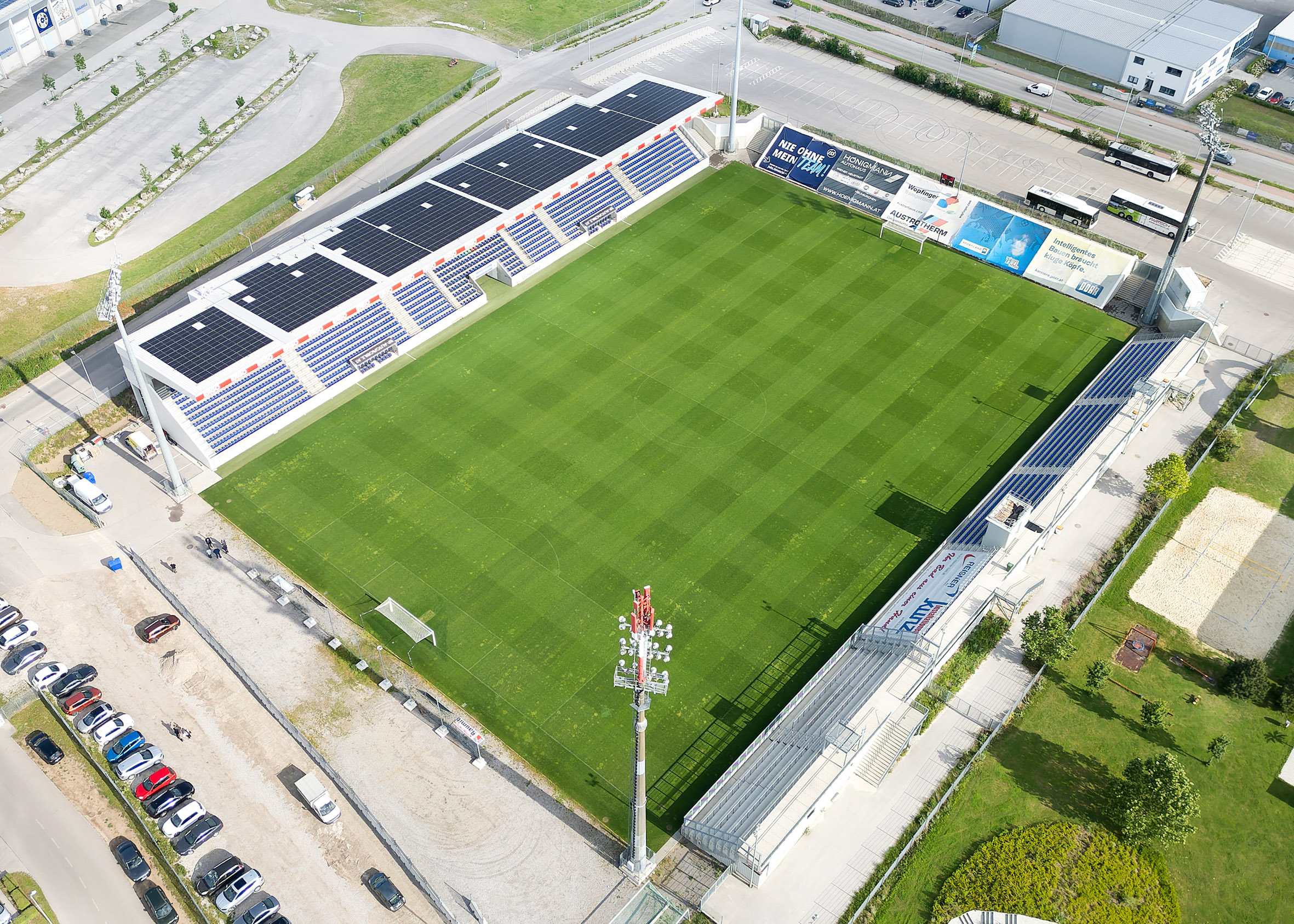
- Interactive map of Wiener Neustadt Arena
- Location: Ferdinand-Graf-von-Zeppelin-Straße 10; 2700 Wiener Neustadt, Austria
- Coordinates: 47°50′28″N 16°15′27″E
- Owner: City of Wiener Neustadt
- Capacity: 4,000
- Field size: 105x68m

Construction
- Built: 2019
- Opened: 28 September 2019

Tenants
- 1. Wiener Neustädter SC; Austrian women's national football team

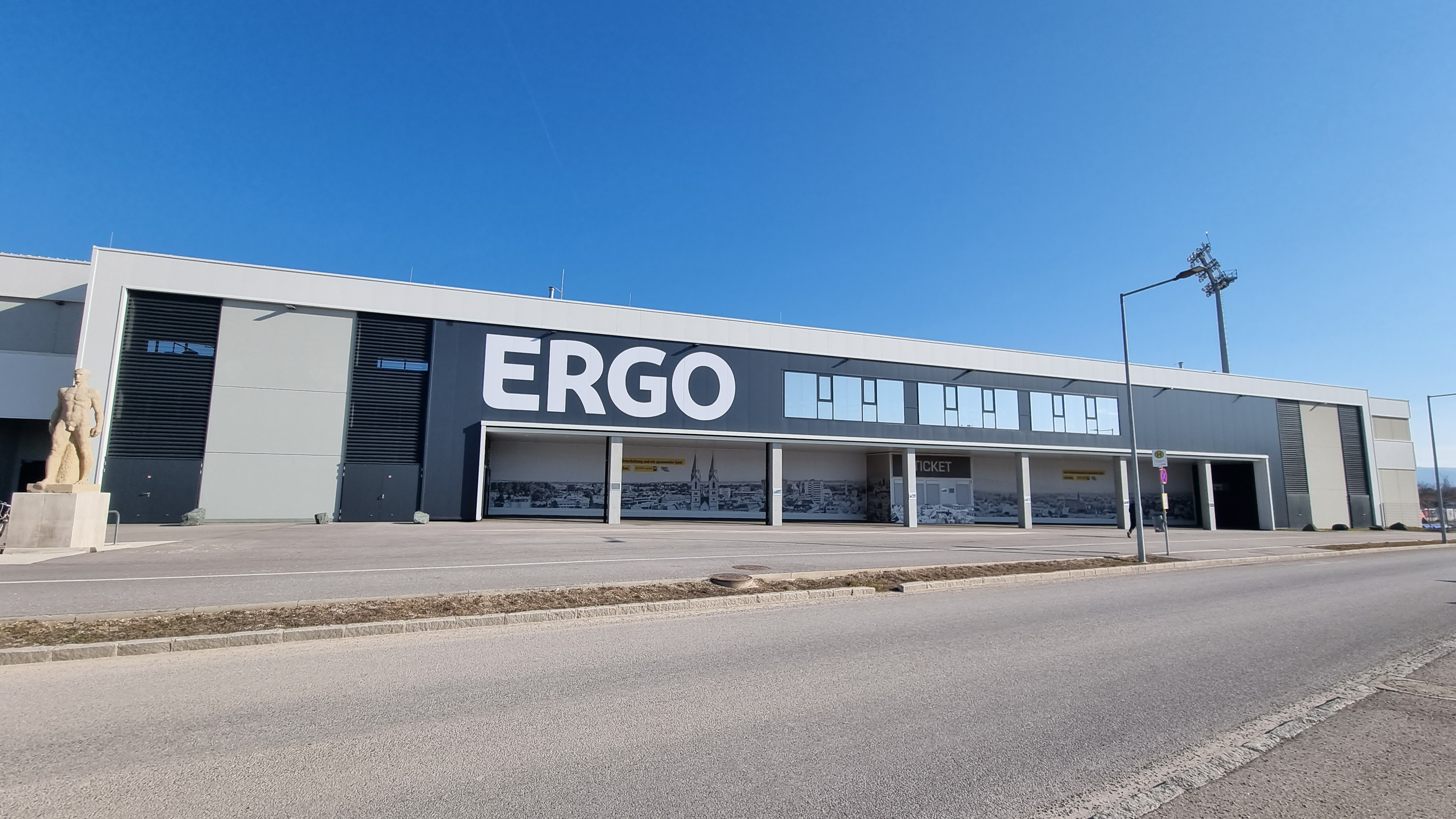
Wiener Neustädter ERGO Arena

Wiener Neustadt Arena is a stadium in Wiener Neustadt, Austria. It is used for association football matches and hosts the men's football team SC Wiener Neustadt and the women's national team.

== History ==
The stadium opened on 28 September 2019, effectively replacing the Stadion Wiener Neustadt, the latter was demolished shortly afterwards during 2020.

The first game was played on 28 September 2019 between the Wiener Neustädter SC amateurs and SC Felixdorf in front of 400 spectators. It currently offers space for 4,000 visitors and is located on the northern outskirts of Wiener Neustadt, directly in an industrial area. Next to the stadium on the east side are the Aqua Nova indoor swimming pool and the SCWN training ground and on the west side the Arena Nova. Just two years after construction, the club decided, together with the Austrian Football Association, to adapt the arena in order to achieve the standard for international games.

In 2024, the Vienna Vikings played four of their European League of Football home games in the Wiener Neustadt Arena.
