= Estadio de Vallehermoso =

Stadium in Madrid, Spain

Coordinates: 40°26′30″N 3°42′36″W

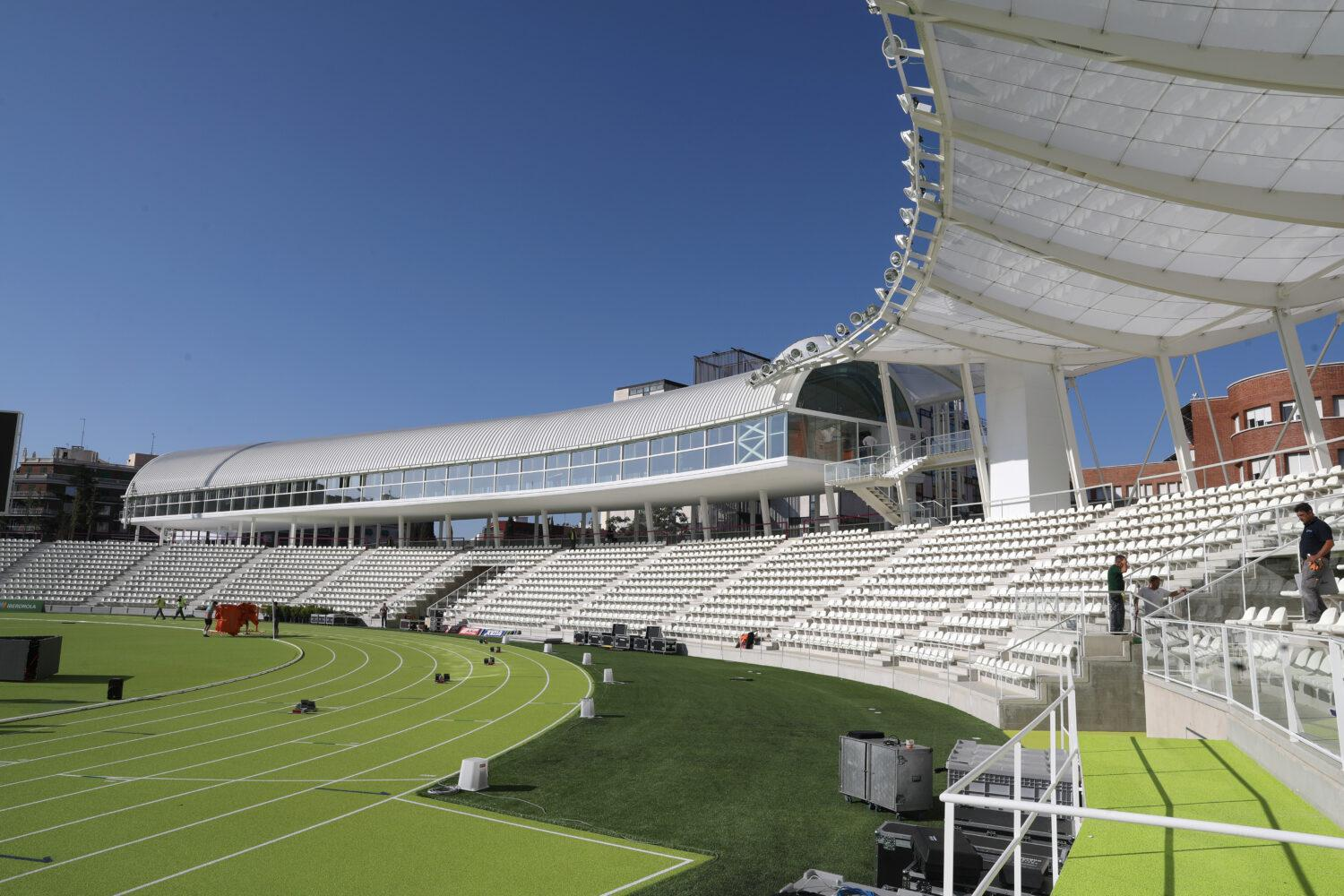
- Interactive map of Estadio de Vallehermoso
- Location: Madrid, Spain
- Owner: Ayuntamiento de Madrid
- Capacity: 9,000

Construction
- Opened: 1957
- Renovated: 2019
- Cost: €14M (reconstruction)
- Architect: Alfonso Cano

Tenants
- Meeting de Atletismo Madrid; Madrid Bravos (2024–present)

Estadio de Vallehermoso is a multi-use stadium in Madrid, Spain. It is currently used mostly for athletics competitions, including the Meeting de Atletismo Madrid. The stadium has a capacity of 9,000 spectators. The stadium also hosted international rugby union matches, such as the test match between Spain and Argentina on 23 November 1982.
