= Sportpark Unterhaching =

Football stadium in Unterhaching, Germany

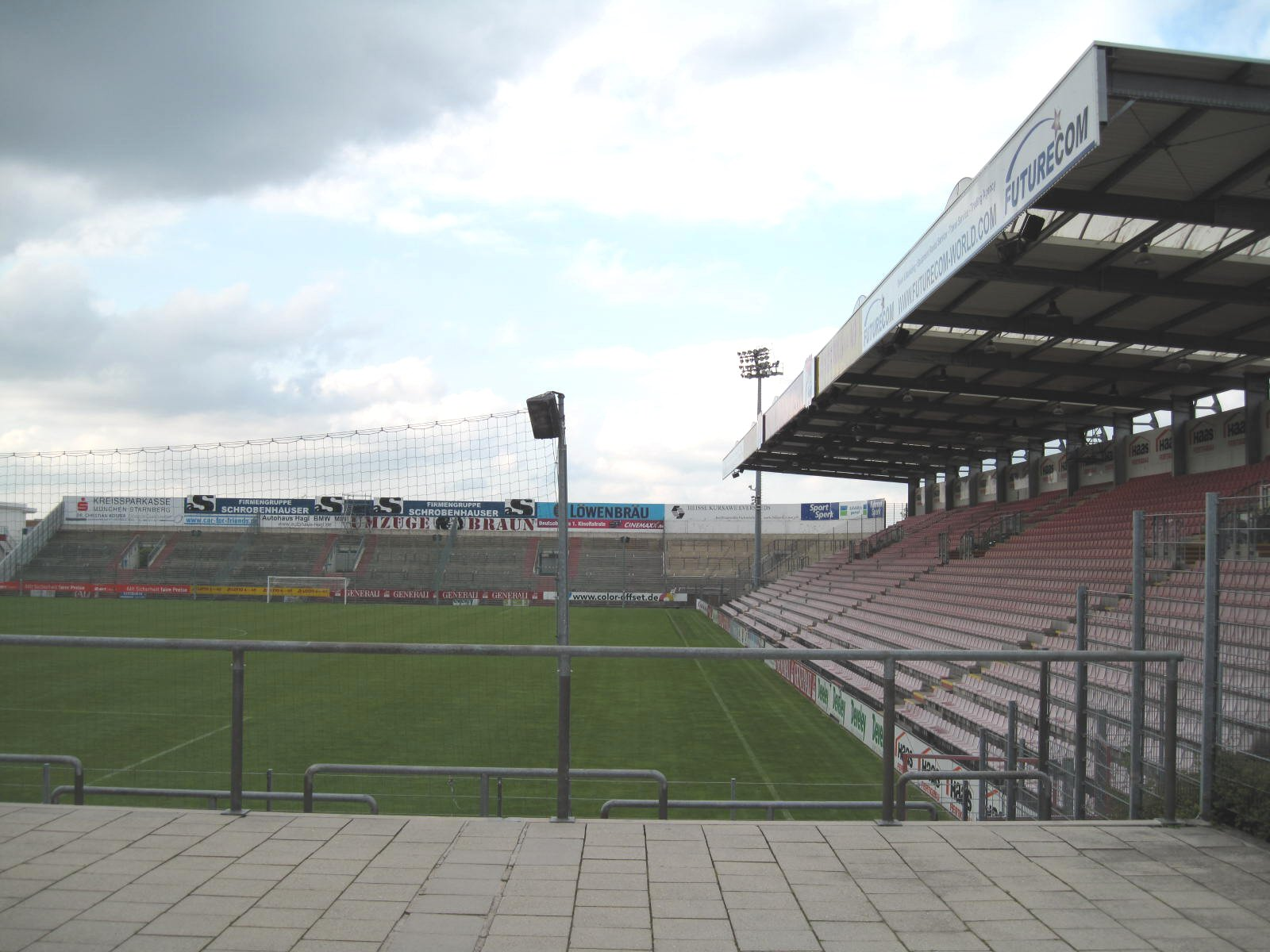
- View of the north and east stands
- Interactive map of Sportpark Unterhaching
- Former names: Sportpark Unterhaching (1992–2003, 2011–2013); Generali Sportpark (2003–2011); Alpenbauer Sportpark (2013–2023)
- Location: Am Sportpark 9, 82008 Unterhaching, Germany
- Coordinates: 48°4′25″N 11°36′56″E
- Owner: Allianz Arena München Stadion GmbH (FC Bayern Munich)
- Capacity: 15,053
- Surface: Grass
- Field size: 105 x 68m

Construction
- Built: 1990–92
- Opened: 1992
- Renovated: 2026
- Expanded: 1999–2000

Tenants
- SpVgg Unterhaching (1992–present); Munich Ravens (2023–present); Bayern Munich Women (2026–present)

Sportpark Unterhaching, officially known as Uhlsport Park, is the home of football club of SpVgg Unterhaching. It is used almost exclusively for first-team games and occasionally for reserve-team games. It has a capacity of 15,053 – 6,874 seated and 8,179 standing. Since 2023 the American football team Munich Ravens have played their home games there as well. Bayern Munich's women's team have been playing their international matches there, starting in the 2026–27 UEFA Women's Champions League season.

== History and development ==
With the club well-established in the 2. Bundesliga, the stadium was constructed in the early 1990s to provide a more suitable home for the team. In 1999, following the unexpected promotion of the team to the Bundesliga, the stadium was expanded and modified to meet the requirements of the German Football Association.

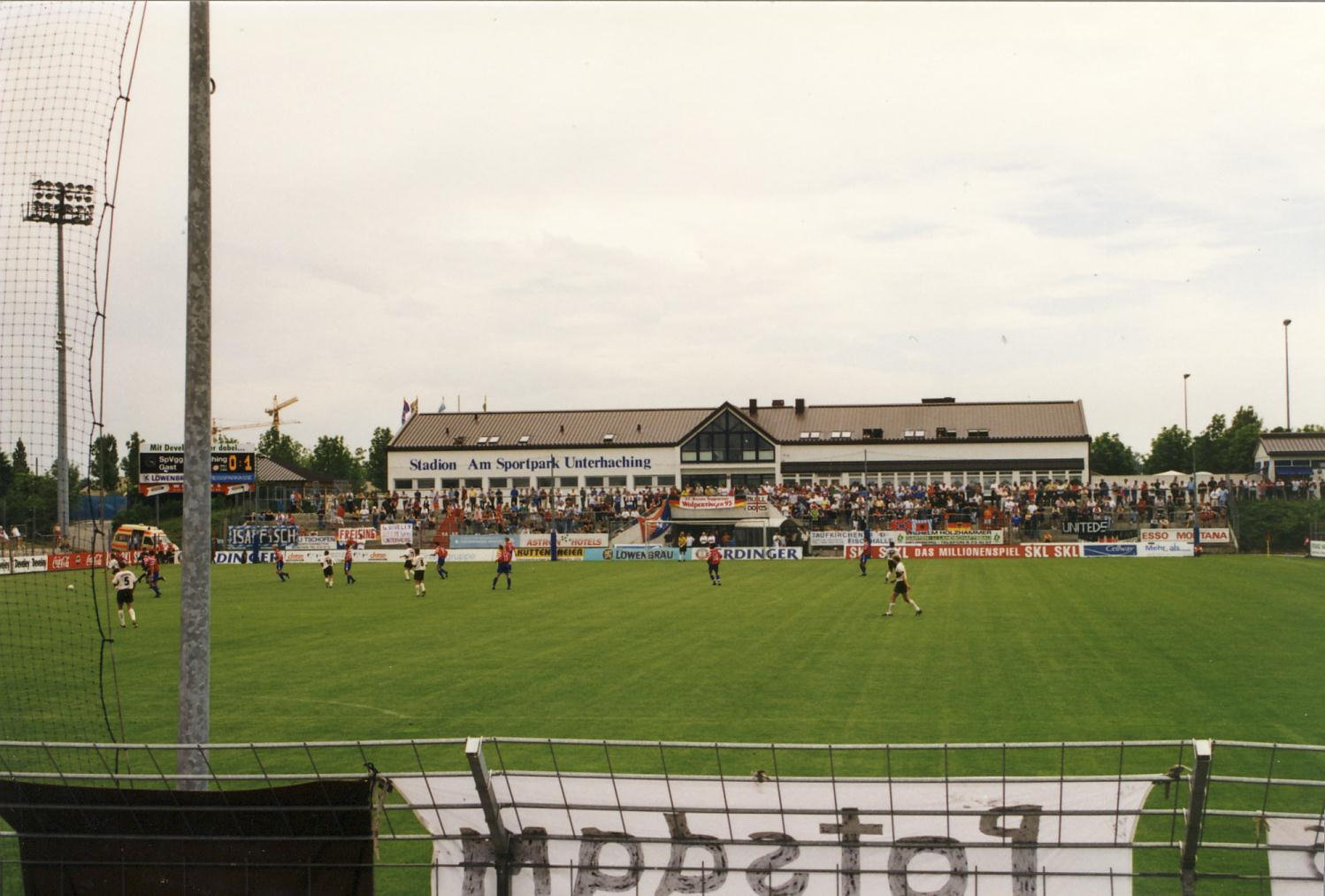
The stadium in 1998, viewed from the north stand

Prior to the stadium expansion, the Sportpark had a capacity of 11,000. The current main stand on the west side of the ground (Haupttribüne, formerly the Westtribüne), with its alpine-style roof, and large parts of the south stand (Südtribüne) were already established, although the current north stand (Nordtribüne) was made up of a few concrete steps and the east stand (Osttribüne) was a grass mound.

Promotion to the Bundesliga in 1999 necessitated improvements in safety, security and capacity, resulting in the current maximum of 15,053.

During first construction phase, prior to season 1999–2000, the capacity of the Nordtribüne – which contains the area for visiting supporters – was significantly increased. In addition, a small standing curve was created in the north-east corner of the stadium. During season 1999–2000, the Nordtribüne was further expanded. After these modifications, the capacity was 10,300; this temporary reduction in capacity was the result of converting standing areas to seating in the Ostribüne.

As a result of the stadium's architecture, development of the Südtribüne (where the clubhouse is situated) and the Haupttribüne (which had an existing roof) was uneconomic. In addition, a VIP house was already situated at the north-west end. Following the successful 1999–2000 season, a curve was constructed between the Südtribüne and Haupttribüne, the Osttribüne was further reinforced and a roof was added, and the Nordtribüne was raised. Following these modifications, the stadium could then fulfill the 15,000 minimum capacity stipulated by the German Football Association.

Outside the stadium, the ground was leveled to create more parking spaces and the combined foot and bicycle lane, running from the stadium to Fasanenpark station, was upgraded. Additional artificial and grass pitches were laid as part of a move to improve training facilities. However, further ground improvements and an increase in the capacity of the Südtribüne were quickly shelved, following relegation from the top-flight.

== Highlights ==
The first game to sell-out at the stadium was the Bundesliga game against VfB Stuttgart in season 1999–2000, attended by 10,300, which ended in a 2–0 victory. Later that season, there were derbies against city rivals 1860 Munich and Bayern Munich. The games were originally planned to take place at the 69,000 capacity Olympic Stadium, until the then-sponsor Erich Lejeune made a compensatory payment, allowing the game to be played at home.

In May 2000, Bayer Leverkusen came to the Sportpark needing to win to clinch the Bundesliga championship on the final day of the season. Unterhaching won the game 2–0, following an own-goal by Michael Ballack and a header by Markus Leitner. Leverkusen's defeat allowed local rivals Bayern Munich to win the championship.

Unterhaching had a good home record and defeated both city rivals in 2000–01, along with victories that season against Borussia Dortmund and Hamburger SV.

2008 saw the first international at the Sportpark, when the German women's national team defeated England 3–0 in front of 9,185 spectators. In 2010, the German U-21 team defeated Ukraine 2–1, with two goals from André Schürrle.

In December 2025, Bayern Munich acquired the stadium from its previous owner, the municipality of Unterhaching. Allianz Arena München Stadion GmbH, a wholly owned subsidiary of FC Bayern München AG, has been the official owner since 1 January 2026. Bayern plan to use the stadium for their women's team, starting with home matches in the 2026–27 UEFA Women's Champions League. SpVgg Unterhaching will also continue to play its matches there.

== Characteristics ==
Despite the upgrade, the stadium still has several charming idiosyncrasies, for example the two-storey clubhouse behind the Südtribüne and the players' tunnel that also comes out of the south stand. The stadium also houses a restaurant and an adjoining beer garden. The south-east corner of the ground has parking for the opponent's team bus.

== Transport ==
=== Public transport ===
From central Munich, take S-Bahn S3 to Fasanenpark (in the direction of Deisenhofen or Holzkirchen). The journey by foot is signposted and takes approximately 15 minutes.

=== By car ===
Coming from the south on the A8, exit at Neubiberg and follow the signs to the stadium. From the north on the A99, turn on to the A8 at the München/Brunnthal intersection. Exit at Neubiberg and follow the signs.
