= Lidl Arena =

Football stadium in Wil, Switzerland

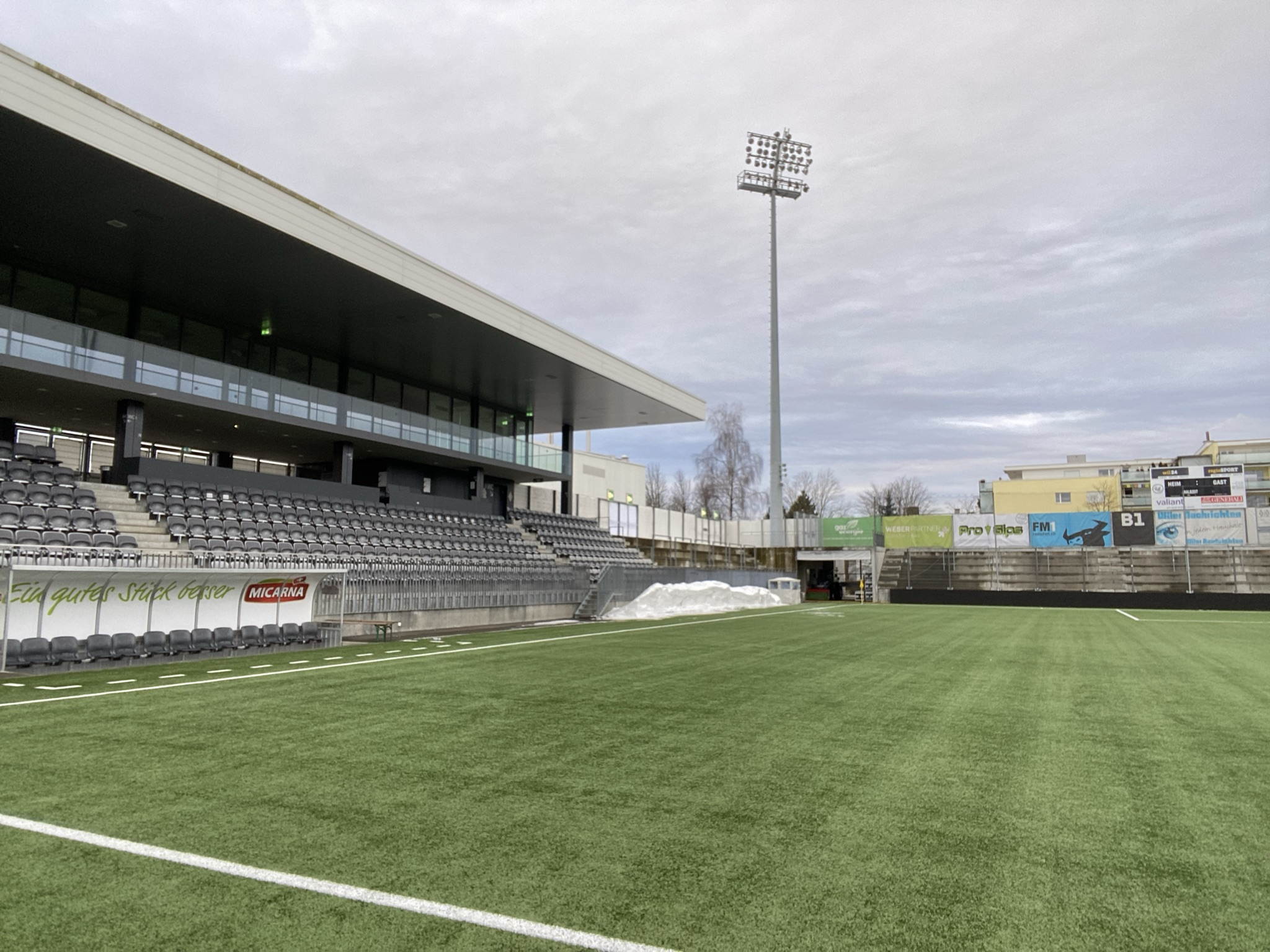
- Interactive map of Lidl Arena
- Former names: Stadion Bergholz, IGP Arena (2013-2019)
- Address: Feldstrasse 40; Wil; Switzerland
- Coordinates: 47°27′30″N 9°02′14″E
- Owner: City of Wil
- Capacity: 6048

Construction
- Built: 1963
- Opened: 1963

Tenants
- FC Wil; Helvetic Mercenaries (2025); Helvetic Guards (2023)

Website
- https://fcwil.ch/wir/sportpark-bergholz/

Lidl Arena (until 2013 and from 2019 to 2022: Stadion Bergholz; from 2013 to 2019: IGP Arena) is located in the city of Wil in the Swiss canton of St. Gallen and is the home ground of the football club FC Wil and the American football franchise Helvetic Mercenaries. The football stadium is owned by the city of Wil.

In European competitions, the stadium is known as FC Wil Arena due to advertising rules.

== Stadium ==
The facility offers a total of 6,000 seats. Of these, 700 are seated and 5,300 are standing. The playing surface is artificial turf. The stadium has four 38-metre-high floodlight masts, which have a total of 126 lamps and provide an illuminance of 700 lux on the pitch. In the 2012/13 season, the stadium was renovated into a "Sportpark Bergholz". Therefore, FC Wil's home matches during the 2012/13 Swiss Football Championship were played at the AFG Arena in St. Gallen.

In November 2013, the Wils-based company IGP Pulvertechnik acquired the sponsorship rights to the Sportpark. The football stadium was thus officially called "IGP Arena". The company paid CHF 100,000 per year for this. At the end of 2019, the name sponsor withdrew from the contract. After a three-year search, a new name sponsor was found in 2022 in the form of the retailer Lidl Switzerland. The stadium has since been called Lidl Arena.

It is part of the eponymous sports facility, which also contains swimming pools and an ice hockey rink, that was newly built at the site of their old ground in 2013, for the cost of around 11 million Swiss francs. Between 2013 and 2020 it bore the name of its sponsor IGP Pulvertechnik, before reverting to its initial name.
