= Munich Ravens =

American football team from Munich, Germany

- Current season
Logo

General information
- Founded: August 3, 2022
- Stadium: Sportpark Unterhaching
- Headquartered: Munich, Germany
- Colors: Blue, white, black
- Mascot: Dave the Rave (Raven)

Personnel
- Owner: Thomas Krohne
- General manager: Sean Shelton
- Head coach: Kendral Ellison

League / conference affiliations
- European Football Alliance (2026-present) European League of Football (2023–2025): Central Conference (2023–2024); South Division (2025)

Championships
- Division championships: 1; 2025

Playoff appearances (3)
- 2024, 2025, 2026

The Munich Ravens are an American football team based in Munich, Germany. The team started playing in the 2023 season of the European League of Football (ELF) and moved to the European Football Alliance (EFA) in 2026.

== History ==
The entry of the newly founded franchise into the professional ELF league was announced in August 2022. However, no name or other information was revealed. On September 8, 2022, the name of the team was announced. On September 28, 2022, it was announced that the former Raiders Tirol quarterback and MVP for the 2022 European League of Football season, Sean Shelton, was appointed Director of Sport Operation.

In February 2026, the newly-formed European Football Alliance announced the Munich Ravens as one of the member franchises for the inaugural 2026 season. The Ravens became the first team to clinch a playoff berth in the new league, finishing the season with a 9-1 record, tied for the best record with the Nordic Storm. In the BIG4 playoffs, the Ravens defeated the Frankfurt Galaxy to advance to the first EFA Championship Game. Munich would lose the championship to the Nordic Storm 48-28.

=== Season-by-season ===
Season	Division	Head coach	Regular season					Postseason				Result	Ø Attendance
Season	Division	Head coach	GP	Won	Lost	Win %	Finish	GP	Won	Lost	Win %	Result	Ø Attendance
2023	ELF Central	John Shoop	12	7	5	0.583	3rd	–	–	–	–	–	5,009
2024	ELF Central	Kendral Ellison	12	9	3	0.750	2nd	1	0	1	0.000		5,036
2025	ELF South	Kendral Ellison	12	11	1	0.917	1st	1	0	1	0.000		3,450
2026	EFA	Kendral Ellison	10	9	1	0.900	2nd	2	1	1	0.500		
Total			46	36	10	0.783	-	4	1	3	0.250		4,498

== Honors ==
=== Team ===
Division Championships

Season	Coach	Record
2025	(United States) Kendral Elisson	11-1

=== Players ===
Honor	Player Name	Season
ELF Offensive Player of the Year	(United States) Markell Castle	2023
EFA Rookie of the Year	(Switzerland) Alex Raich	2026
EFA Special Teams Player of the Year	(United States) Bijon Harris	2026
EFA Man of Honor	(New Zealand) Etuale Lui	2026

=== Coaches ===
Honor	Coach Name	Season
ELF Coach of the Year	(United States) Kendral Elisson	2025
EFA Coach of the Year	(United States) Kendral Elisson	2026
