= Helvetic Mercenaries =

European American football team

- Current season

General information
- Founded: April 4, 2024
- Folded: 2026
- Headquartered: Wil, Switzerland
- Colors: Red, white, black
- www.helveticmercenaries.ch

Personnel
- Owners: Sonja & Sandro Moor
- General manager: Chris Rummel
- Head coach: Joshua Fitzgerald

Team history
- Helvetic Mercenaries

Home fields
- Stadion Brühl Grenchen (one game 2024); Stadion Kleinfeld Kriens (2024); Lidl Arena Wil (2025)

League / conference affiliations
- European League of Football (2024–2025): Central Conference (2024); South Division (2025)

The Helvetic Mercenaries were an American football team based in Switzerland that competed in the European League of Football (ELF).

== History ==
On 4 April 2024, the owners of the Helvetic Guards, the previous ELF team based in Switzerland, announced that the team would be ceasing operations, and that a new team would be replacing them for the 2024 European League of Football season. On 11 April 2024, the logo and the name Helvetic Mercenaries was announced.

Managing Director is Chris Rummel, who also worked as Head of Finance at the Swiss American Football Association and was responsible for the Swiss national team. Sports director was Matt Hammer, who also held this position with the Guards. Most Guards players and coaches were re-signed by the Mercenaries. In June 2024, Sonja and Sandro Moor took over the franchise as new owners. Jeremy Bryson became the new Director of Sports.

Val Gunn was head coach for the 2024 season, with former Guards head coach Norm Chow acting as advisor. However, on July 11, 2024, after the first win in six games, Gunn parted ways with the Mercenaries. Defensive coordinator Bryan Billy took over as head coach, but lost all six games. The Mercenaries finished as sixth and last in the Central Conference.

Head coach for the 2025 season is Marcus Herford. American Isaiah Weed was signed for the quarterback position.

After much controversy surrounding the ELF, with various teams leaving the league, the Helvetic Mercenaries have announced they will not participate in the 2026 ELF season, citing a lack of "responsible implementation of the framework conditions". According to the German sports channel ran, they are in contact with both the European Football Alliance and the American Football League Europe for a possible future entry.

In January 2026, the Helvetic Mercenaries announced a partnership with Nationalliga A team Basel Gladiators with the primary focus of developing young talent in Switzerland and have withdrawn from European competitions for the time being.

=== Season-by-season ===
Name	Term	Regular season					Postseason				Ø Attendance
Name	Term	GP	Won	Lost	Win %	Finish	GP	Won	Lost	Win %	Ø Attendance
2024	Val Gunn/Bryan Billy	12	1	11	8.33	6th (Central)	did not qualify				1,028
2025	Marcus Herford/Joshua Fitzgerald	12	0	12	0.00	4th (South)	did not qualify				1,541
