= 2024 Madrid Bravos season =

- General manager: Jaime Martín Lostao
- Head coach: (United States) Rip Scherer
- Home stadium: Estadio de Vallehermoso

Results
- Record: 8–4
- Conference place: 3rd Western
- Playoffs: Wildcard

Uniform

The 2024 Madrid Bravos season was the first season of the Madrid Bravos team in the European League of Football. They were located in the Western Conference of the ELF.

Rip Scherer was the head coach of the club's first season.

After starting with three consecutive wins, the inaugural one at the Spanish derby against Barcelona Dragons, Bravos ended the regular season with a record of eight wins and four losses, thus qualifying for the wild card, where they were defeated by Rhein Fire.

== Staff ==
2024 Madrid Bravos staff
Front office: General manager – Jaime Martín Lostao; Head coaches: Head coach – Rip Scherer; Assistant head coach – Mac McWhorter; Offensive coaches: Offensive coordinator – Dave Warner; Offensive line – Mac McWhorter	Defensive coaches: Defensive coordinator – Raymond Woodward; Defensive line – Mark Ridgley; Special teams coaches: Special teams coordinator – Mark Ridgley; Strength and conditioning: Head strength and conditioning – Felipe Mantecón

== Roster ==
2024 Madrid Bravos roster
Quarterbacks (QB): 12 (Spain) Sergio Barbero; 15 (United States) Steve Duncan; 11 (Spain) Adrián Meléndez; Running backs (RB): 21 (Spain) Daniel Romero; 22 (United Kingdom) D'Wayne Obi; 43 (Spain) Eduardo Molina; Wide receivers (WR): 10 (Germany) Jean-Claude Madin Cerezo; 11 (United States) William Patterson; 16 (Spain) Javier Barrena; 18 (Spain) Eduardo Pérez; 84 (Spain) Mario Flores; Tight ends (TE): 14 (Spain) Raúl Cernuda; 42 (Spain) Nacho Diz Bravo; 44 (Spain) Emilio Ibáñez	Offensive linemen (OL): 55 (Germany) Robin Fensch; 56 (United Kingdom) Connor Bolton; 60 (Spain) Celestin Ngimbi; 65 (Spain) Deivis Jael Fabián Viola; 71 (Spain) David Culebras; 72 (Spain) David Contreras; 77 (Spain) Carlos Carrasco; 79 (Norway) Jonas Hagerup; Defensive linemen (DL): 0 (Spain) Yago Rivero; 1 (Spain) Alejandro Fernández; 9 (Spain) Sebastián Bowen; 53 (Spain) Sandro Moreira; 90 (Spain) Leonardo Rovesti; 91 (Spain) Diego Irles; 97 (Spain) Diego Paz; 98 (Spain) Víctor dos Santos; 99 (Spain) Daniel López	Linebackers (LB): 2 (Spain) Javier Carrasco; 23 (United Kingdom) Jonell Pelie; 47 (Romania) Andrei Luca; 54 (Spain) Víctor Albarracín; 59 (Spain) Sebastián Castañer; Defensive backs (DB): 3 (Spain) Pablo Araya; 5 (Spain) Félix Velasco; 6 (United States) Luke Glenna; 8 (United States) Ja'Len Embry; 13 (Spain) Julio Aguado; 20 (Spain) Pablo de Diego; 27 (Spain) Andy Vera; 32 (Spain) Álvaro Cansinos; Special teams (ST): 4 (Spain) Álvaro Guitián K; 24 (Spain) Antonio Sarriá P	Reserve: 7 (United States) Chris Helbig; Rookies in italics 45 active

== Regular season ==
=== Standings ===
==== Division ====
Western Conference
Pos	Team	GP	W	L	CONF	PF	PA	DIFF	STK	Qualification
1	(Germany) Rhein Fire	12	11	1	9–1	476	174	+302	W9	Automatic playoffs (#3)
2	(France) Paris Musketeers	12	10	2	8–2	407	242	+165	W4	Advance to playoffs (#4)
3	(Spain) Madrid Bravos	12	8	4	6–4	411	204	+207	W1	Advance to playoffs (#6)
4	(Germany) Cologne Centurions	12	6	6	4–6	303	444	-141	W2	
5	(Germany) Frankfurt Galaxy	12	4	8	3–7	285	397	-112	L2	
6	(Germany) Hamburg Sea Devils	12	2	10	0–10	226	473	-247	L9	

Source: europeanleague.football

==== Overall ====
Overall standings
#	Team	Division	W	L	PCT	CONF	PD	STK
Conference leaders
1	(Austria) Vienna Vikings	East	12	0	1.000	8–0	+278	W12
2	(Germany) Stuttgart Surge	Central	11	1	.917	9–1	+386	W2
3	(Germany) Rhein Fire	West	11	1	.917	9–1	+302	W9
Wild cards
4	(France) Paris Musketeers	West	10	2	.833	8–2	+165	W4
5	(Germany) Munich Ravens	Central	9	3	.750	7–3	+343	W7
6	(Spain) Madrid Bravos	West	8	4	.667	6–4	+207	W1
Not Qualified for the Playoffs
7	(Austria) Raiders Tirol	Central	8	4	.667	8–2	+132	L1
8	(Poland) Panthers Wrocław	East	6	6	.500	5–3	+71	W2
9	(Germany) Cologne Centurions	West	6	6	.500	4–6	-141	W2
10	(Germany) Berlin Thunder	East	5	7	.417	5–3	+60	L1
11	(Germany) Frankfurt Galaxy	West	4	8	.333	3–7	-112	L2
12	(Italy) Milano Seamen	Central	4	8	.333	3–7	-194	W1
13	(Germany) Hamburg Sea Devils	West	2	10	.167	0–10	-247	L9
14	(Hungary) Fehérvár Enthroners	East	2	10	.167	1–7	-254	L4
15	(Spain) Barcelona Dragons	Central	2	10	.167	2–8	-460	L8
16	(Switzerland) Helvetic Mercenaries	Central	1	11	.083	1–9	-253	L6
17	(Czech Republic) Prague Lions	East	1	11	.083	1–7	-283	L1

=== Schedule ===
Week	Date	Opponent (Note: Intra-Conference games are in bold text)	Result	Record	Venue	Att.	Recap
1	bye						
2	Sat, June 1	Barcelona Dragons	W 42–12	1–0	Estadio de Vallehermoso	2,071	Recap
3	Sat, June 8	at Rhein Fire	W 22–10	2–0	Niederrheinstadion	8,146	Recap
4	Sat, June 15	at Cologne Centurions	W 35–24	3–0	New Tivoli	1,798	Recap
5	bye						
6	Sat, June 29	Rhein Fire	L 15–40	3–1	Estadio de Vallehermoso	1,946	Recap
7	Sat, July 6	Frankfurt Galaxy	W 46–15	4–1	Estadio de Vallehermoso	1,102	Recap
8	Sat, July 13	at Barcelona Dragons	W 54–0	5–1	Estadi Municipal de Badalona	1,918	Recap
9	Sun, July 21	Paris Musketeers	L 13–29	5–2	Estadio de Vallehermoso	983	Recap
10	Sat, July 27	Cologne Centurions	W 37–0	6–2	Estadio de Vallehermoso	954	Recap
11	Sat, August 3	Hamburg Sea Devils	W 52–9	7–2	Estadio de Vallehermoso	1,304	Recap
12	Sat, August 10	at Frankfurt Galaxy	L 20–37	7–3	PSD Bank Arena	5,222	Recap
13	Sat, August 17	at Paris Musketeers	L 12–15	7–4	Stade Jean-Bouin	3,000	Recap
14	Sat, August 24	at Hamburg Sea Devils	W 63–13	8–4	Stadion Šubićevac, Šibenik	2,532	Recap

Source: europeanleague.football

=== Game summaries ===
Barcelona Dragons vs. Madrid Bravos

Quarter	1	2	3	4	Total
Dragons	6	0	6	0	12
Bravos	14	22	6	0	42

at Estadio de Vallehermoso, Madrid, Spain

- Date: 1 June 2024
- Game time: 17:30 CEST
- Game attendance: 2,071
- Referee: Wojciech Ratajczak
Madrid Bravos vs. Rhein Fire

Quarter	1	2	3	4	Total
Bravos	12	3	6	7	28
Fire	0	0	7	3	10

at Niederrheinstadion, Oberhausen, Germany

- Date: 8 June 2024
- Game time: 14:30 CEST
- Game attendance: 8,146
- Referee: John Haentjens
Madrid Bravos vs. Cologne Centurions

Quarter	1	2	3	4	Total
Bravos	7	13	7	8	35
Centurions	0	10	0	14	24

at New Tivoli, Aachen, Germany

- Date: 15 June 2024
- Game time: 17:00 CEST
- Game attendance: 1,798
- Referee: Gyula Udvardi
Rhein Fire vs. Madrid Bravos

Quarter	1	2	3	4	Total
Fire	0	20	7	13	40
Bravos	0	0	2	13	15

at Estadio de Vallehermoso, Madrid, Spain

- Date: 29 June 2024
- Game time: 19:00 CEST
- Game attendance: 1,946
- Referee: Frank Kristensen
Frankfurt Galaxy vs. Madrid Bravos

Quarter	1	2	3	4	Total
Galaxy	9	0	0	6	15
Bravos	13	10	10	13	46

at Estadio de Vallehermoso, Madrid, Spain

- Date: 9 July 2024
- Game time: 19:00 CEST
- Game attendance: 1,102
- Referee: Frank Kristensen
Madrid Bravos vs. Barcelona Dragons

Quarter	1	2	3	4	Total
Bravos	19	18	17	0	54
Dragons	0	0	0	0	0

at Estadi Municipal, Badalona, Spain

- Date: 13 July 2024
- Game time: 18:00 CEST
- Game attendance: 1,918
- Referee: Thomas Plendl
Paris Musketeers vs. Madrid Bravos

Quarter	1	2	3	4	Total
Musketeers	7	3	3	16	29
Bravos	7	0	0	6	13

at Estadio de Vallehermoso, Madrid, Spain

- Date: 21 July 2024
- Game time: 13:00 CEST
- Game attendance: 983
- Referee: Wojciech Ratajczak
Cologne Centurions vs. Madrid Bravos

Quarter	1	2	3	4	Total
Centurions	0	0	0	0	0
Bravos	14	0	23	0	37

at Estadio de Vallehermoso, Madrid, Spain

- Date: 27 July 2024
- Game time: 19:00 CEST
- Game attendance: 954
- Referee: Krzystof Walentynowicz
Hamburg Sea Devils vs. Madrid Bravos

Quarter	1	2	3	4	Total
Sea Devils	3	6	0	0	9
Bravos	14	17	14	7	52

at Estadio de Vallehermoso, Madrid, Spain

- Date: 3 August 2024
- Game time: 19:00 CEST
- Game attendance: 1,304
- Referee: John Haentjens
Madrid Bravos vs. Frankfurt Galaxy

Quarter	1	2	3	4	Total
Bravos	0	6	0	14	20
Bravos	17	10	0	10	37

at PSD Bank Arena, Frankfurt, Germany

- Date: 10 August 2024
- Game time: 18:00 CEST
- Game attendance: 5,222
- Referee: Krzystof Walentynowicz
Madrid Bravos vs. Paris Musketeers

Quarter	1	2	3	4	OT	Total
Bravos	0	0	12	0	0	12
Musketeers	0	6	0	6	3	15

at Stade Jean-Bouin, Paris, France

- Date: 17 August 2024
- Game time: 16:00 CEST
- Game attendance: 3,000
Madrid Bravos vs. Hamburg Sea Devils

Quarter	1	2	3	4	Total
Bravos	14	22	12	15	63
Sea Devils	0	6	0	7	13

at Stadion Šubićevac, Šibenik, Croatia

- Date: 24 August 2024
- Game time: 18:00 CEST
- Game attendance: 2,532
- Referee: Wojciech Ratajczak

== Play-offs ==
Week	Date	Opponent	Result	Record	Venue	Att.	Recap
Wild card	September 1	at Rhein Fire	L 10–40	0–1	MSV-Arena	7,149	Recap

=== Game summaries ===
Madrid Bravos vs. Rhein Fire

Quarter	1	2	3	4	Total
Bravos	3	7	0	0	10
Fire	20	14	6	0	40

at Schauinsland-Reisen-Arena, Duisburg, Germany

- Date: 1 September 2024
- Game time: 15:15 CEST
- Game attendance: 7,149
- Referee: John Haentjens
