= 2024 European League of Football season =

2024 ELF season
- League: European League of Football
- Sport: American football
- Duration: May 25, 2024 – September 22, 2024
- Games: 102 + 5 playoff games
- Teams: 17
- Total attendance: 432,739
- Average attendance: 3,982 ▲1.7%
- Season MVP: Glen Toonga (Rhein Fire)
- Western Conference champions: (Germany) Rhein Fire
- Central Conference champions: (Germany) Stuttgart Surge
- Eastern Conference champions: (Austria) Vienna Vikings

2024 Championship Game
- Date: September 22, 2024
- Venue: Veltins-Arena, Gelsenkirchen
- Champions: Rhein Fire (2nd title)
- Finals MVP: Jadrian Clark

Seasons
- 2023 2025

The 2024 ELF season was the fourth season of the European League of Football, a professional American football league based in Europe. Seventeen teams from nine countries participated. The season started on May 25, and concluded with the ELF Championship Game in the Veltins-Arena Gelsenkirchen, Germany on September 22, 2024. Incumbent champion Rhein Fire won the title again, beating Vienna Vikings 51-20.

Location of ELF teams
- Western Conference
- Central Conference
- Eastern Conference

== Format ==
The teams are divided into three conferences of 5 or 6 teams. Each team plays 12 games during the regular season. The winner of each conference, as well as the next best 3 teams, regardless of conference, qualify for the playoffs.

== Teams ==
Of the 17 teams from the 2023 season, 15 are competing in 2024, and are joined by one new expansion team: Madrid Bravos. Teams not returning for the new season are the Leipzig Kings and the Helvetic Guards, the latter replaced by a new Swiss team, the Helvetic Mercenaries.

Team	City	Stadium(s)	Capacity	Joined	Head coach
Western Conference
Cologne Centurions	(Germany) Cologne	Südstadion	11,748	2021	(United States) Gregg Brandon
Cologne Centurions	(Germany) Aachen	Tivoli (Note: Four home games)	31,026	2021	(United States) Gregg Brandon
Frankfurt Galaxy	(Germany) Frankfurt	PSD Bank Arena	12,542	2021	(Germany) Thomas Kösling
Frankfurt Galaxy	(Germany) Offenbach am Main	Stadion am Bieberer Berg (Note: First home game of the 2024 season)	20,500	2021	(Germany) Thomas Kösling
Hamburg Sea Devils	(Germany) Hamburg	Volksparkstadion (Note: One home game)	57,000	2021	(United States) Matt Johnson
Hamburg Sea Devils	(Germany) Bremen	Wohninvest Weserstadion (Note: First home game of the 2024 season)	42,100	2021	(United States) Matt Johnson
Hamburg Sea Devils	(Germany) Hannover	Eilenriedestadion (Note: One home game)	2,500	2021	(United States) Matt Johnson
Hamburg Sea Devils	(Germany) Hannover	Heinz von Heiden Arena (Note: One home game)	49,200	2021	(United States) Matt Johnson
Hamburg Sea Devils	(Germany) Lübeck	Stadion Lohmühle (Note: One home game)	17,849	2021	(United States) Matt Johnson
Hamburg Sea Devils	(Croatia) Šibenik	Stadion Šubićevac (Note: One home game)	3,412	2021	(United States) Matt Johnson
Paris Musketeers	(France) Paris	Stade Jean-Bouin	20,000	2023	(United States) Marc Mattioli
Paris Musketeers	(France) Valenciennes	Stade du Hainaut (Note: One home game)	25,172	2023	(United States) Marc Mattioli
Rhein Fire	(Germany) Düsseldorf/Duisburg	Schauinsland-Reisen-Arena	31,514	2022	(United States) Jim Tomsula
Rhein Fire	(Germany) Oberhausen	Niederrheinstadion (Note: First home game of the 2024 season)	17,165	2022	(United States) Jim Tomsula
Madrid Bravos	(Spain) Madrid	Estadio de Vallehermoso	9,000	2024	(United States) Rip Scherer
Central Conference
Barcelona Dragons	(Spain) Barcelona/Badalona	Estadi Municipal de Badalona	4,170	2021	(United States) David Shelton
Helvetic Mercenaries	(Switzerland) Kriens	Sportzentrum Kleinfeld	3,500	2024	(United States) Val Gunn
Helvetic Mercenaries	(Switzerland) Grenchen	Stadion Brühl (Note: First home game of the 2024 season)	10,964	2024	(United States) Val Gunn
Milano Seamen	(Italy) Milan	Velodromo Maspes-Vigorelli	7,500	2023	(United States) Jim Ward
Munich Ravens	(Germany) Unterhaching	Uhlsport Park	15,053	2023	(United States) Kendral Ellison
Munich Ravens	(Germany) Nuremberg	Max-Morlock-Stadion (Note: One home game)	50,000	2023	(United States) Kendral Ellison
Raiders Tirol	(Austria) Innsbruck	Tivoli Stadion Tirol	16,008	2022	(United States) Jim Herrmann
Stuttgart Surge	(Germany) Stuttgart	Gazi-Stadion auf der Waldau	11,410	2021	(United States) Jordan Neuman
Stuttgart Surge	(Germany) Reutlingen	Stadion an der Kreuzeiche (Note: Two home games)	15,228	2021	(United States) Jordan Neuman
Stuttgart Surge	(Germany) Sinsheim	PreZero Arena (Note: First home game of the 2024 season)	30,150	2021	(United States) Jordan Neuman
Eastern Conference
Berlin Thunder	(Germany) Berlin	Friedrich-Ludwig-Jahn-Sportpark	19,708	2021	(Germany) Johnny Schmuck
Fehérvár Enthroners	(Hungary) Székesfehérvár	First Field	3,500	2023	(United States) Joseph Ashfield
Panthers Wrocław	(Poland) Wrocław	Stadion Olimpijski	11,000	2021	(United States) Dave Christensen
Panthers Wrocław	(Poland) Wrocław	Tarczyński Arena (Note: First home game of the 2024 season)	45,105	2021	(United States) Dave Christensen
Prague Lions	(Czech Republic) Prague	Atletický stadion SK Slavia Praha	3,000	2023	(United States) Dan Disch
Prague Lions	(Czech Republic) Prague	Stadion FK Viktoria Žižkov (Note: First home game of the 2024 season)	5,037	2023	(United States) Dan Disch
Prague Lions	(Czech Republic) Ústí nad Labem	Městský stadion (Note: One home game)	4,000	2023	(United States) Dan Disch
Vienna Vikings	(Austria) Vienna	Generali Arena Vienna (Note: Three home games)	17,500	2022	(United States) Chris Calaycay
Vienna Vikings	(Austria) Wiener Neustadt	Wiener Neustadt Ergo Arena	4,000	2022	(United States) Chris Calaycay

== Regular season ==
=== Schedule ===
The schedule for the 2024 season was released on January 16, 2024 without any specific times and venues.

==== Week 1 ====
Date/Time (CEST)	Conf.	Away team	Result	Home team	Venue	Attendance	Free TV	Viewers	Ref
Sat, 25. May	Eastern	Vienna Vikings	43 – 18	Féhervár Enthroners	First Field	1,500			
Sat, 25. May	Central	Barcelona Dragons	23 – 19	Helvetic Mercenaries	Stadion Brühl	1,250			
Sat, 25. May	Central	Raiders Tirol	32 – 0	Milano Seamen	Velodromo Maspes-Vigorelli	800			
Sun, 26. May	Eastern	Berlin Thunder	39 – 49	Wroclaw Panthers	Tarczyński Arena	15,128			
Sun, 26. May	Western	Rhein Fire	42 – 12	Cologne Centurions	Tivoli	8,558			
Sun, 26. May	IC	Hamburg Sea Devils	31 – 21	Prague Lions	Stadion FK Viktoria Žižkov	1,075			
Sun, 26. May	Central	Munich Ravens	5 – 27	Stuttgart Surge	PreZero Arena	8,432			
Bye		Frankfurt Galaxy, Madrid Bravos, Paris Musketeers							

==== Week 2 ====
Date/Time (CEST)	Conf.	Away team	Result	Home team	Venue	Attendance	Free TV	Viewers	Ref
Sat, 1. June	IC	Stuttgart Surge	44 – 34	Wroclaw Panthers	Stadion Olimpijski	4,324			
Sat, 1. June	IC	Raiders Tirol	6 – 27	Vienna Vikings	Generali Arena Vienna	10,919			
Sat, 1. June	Central	Munich Ravens	47 – 7	Milano Seamen	Velodromo Maspes-Vigorelli	650			
Sat, 1. June	IC	Barcelona Dragons	12 – 42	Madrid Bravos	Estadio de Vallehermoso	2,071			
Sun, 2. June	Eastern	Prague Lions	17 – 48	Berlin Thunder	Friedrich-Ludwig-Jahn-Sportpark	3,758			
Sun, 2. June	Western	Paris Musketeers	41 – 14	Hamburg Sea Devils	Wohninvest Weserstadion	13,834			
Sun, 2. June	Western	Rhein Fire	31 – 20	Frankfurt Galaxy	Stadion am Bieberer Berg	13,586			
Sun, 2. June	IC	Féhervár Enthroners	10 – 35	Cologne Centurions	Tivoli	1,608			
Bye		Helvetic Mercenaries							

==== Week 3 ====
Date/Time (CEST)	Conf.	Away team	Result	Home team	Venue	Attendance	Free TV	Viewers	Ref
Sat, 8. June	Western	Madrid Bravos	22 – 10	Rhein Fire	Niederrheinstadion	8,146			
Sat, 8. June	Central	Raiders Tirol	63 – 7	Barcelona Dragons	Estadi Municipal de Badalona	1,122			
Sat, 8. June	Central	Helvetic Mercenaries	7 – 14	Milano Seamen	Velodromo Maspes-Vigorelli	1,000			
Sun, 9. June	Eastern	Féhervár Enthroners	3 – 43	Berlin Thunder	Friedrich-Ludwig-Jahn-Sportpark	3,038			
Sun, 9. June	Eastern	Vienna Vikings	16 – 13	Wroclaw Panthers	Stadion Olimpijski	4,658			
Sun, 9. June	Western	Frankfurt Galaxy	22 – 25	Paris Musketeers	Stade Jean-Bouin	4,523			
Sun, 9. June	IC	Prague Lions	7 – 51	Munich Ravens	Uhlsport Park	3,944			
Bye		Cologne Centurions, Hamburg Sea Devils, Stuttgart Surge							

==== Week 4 ====
Date/Time (CEST)	Conf.	Away team	Result	Home team	Venue	Attendance	Free TV	Viewers	Ref
Sat, 15. June	Western	Rhein Fire	19 – 14	Paris Musketeers	Stade Jean-Bouin	3,000			
Sat, 15. June	Western	Madrid Bravos	35 – 24	Cologne Centurions	Tivoli	1,798			
Sat, 15. June	Eastern	Berlin Thunder	20 – 25	Vienna Vikings	Generali Arena Vienna	9,014			
Sat, 15. June	Central	Helvetic Mercenaries	12 – 14	Barcelona Dragons	Estadi Municipal de Badalona	500			
Sun, 16. June	IC	Wroclaw Panthers	10 – 20	Frankfurt Galaxy	PSD Bank Arena	5,297			
Sun, 16. June	Central	Milano Seamen	9 – 55	Stuttgart Surge	Stadion an der Kreuzeiche	2,970			
Sun, 16. June	Central	Munich Ravens	26 – 29	Raiders Tirol	Tivoli Stadion Tirol	4,011			
Sun, 16. June	IC	Prague Lions	17 – 27	Hamburg Sea Devils	Stadion Lohmühle	3,104			
Bye		Féhervár Enthroners							

==== Week 5 ====
Date/Time (CEST)	Conf.	Away team	Result	Home team	Venue	Attendance	Free TV	Viewers	Ref
Sat, 22. June	Central	Milano Seamen	27 – 18	Barcelona Dragons	Estadi Municipal de Badalona	550			
Sat, 22. June	Central	Raiders Tirol	33 – 10	Helvetic Mercenaries	Sportzentrum Kleinfeld	1,000			
Sat, 22. June	Central	Stuttgart Surge	38 – 22	Munich Ravens	Max-Morlock-Stadion	10,822			
Sun, 23. June	Eastern	Vienna Vikings	42 – 3	Prague Lions	Atletický stadion SK Slavia Praha	752			
Sun, 23. June	Eastern	Wroclaw Panthers	44 – 12	Féhervár Enthroners	First Field	2,000			
Sun, 23. June	IC	Rhein Fire	27 – 24	Berlin Thunder	Friedrich-Ludwig-Jahn-Sportpark	4,759			
Bye		Cologne Centurions, Frankfurt Galaxy, Hamburg Sea Devils, Madrid Bravos, Paris Musketeers							

==== Week 6 ====
Date/Time (CEST)	Conf.	Away team	Result	Home team	Venue	Attendance	Free TV	Viewers	Ref
Sat, 29. June	Central	Barcelona Dragons	0 – 32	Raiders Tirol	Tivoli Stadion Tirol	2,939			
Sat, 29. June	Eastern	Wroclaw Panthers	25 – 37	Vienna Vikings	Wiener Neustadt Ergo Arena	2,795			
Sat, 29. June	Western	Rhein Fire	40 – 15	Madrid Bravos	Estadio de Vallehermoso	1,946			
Sat, 29. June	IC	Féhervár Enthroners	14 – 19	Milano Seamen	Velodromo Maspes-Vigorelli	500			
Sun, 30. June	Central	Helvetic Mercenaries	7 – 50	Stuttgart Surge	Stadion an der Kreuzeiche	3,207			
Sun, 30. June	Western	Cologne Centurions	25 – 60	Paris Musketeers	Stade Jean-Bouin	3,500			
Sun, 30. June	Eastern	Berlin Thunder	34 – 7	Prague Lions	Městský stadion	467			
Sun, 30. June	Western	Hamburg Sea Devils	18 – 24	Frankfurt Galaxy	PSD Bank Arena	5,862			
Bye		Munich Ravens							

==== Week 7 ====
Date/Time (CEST)	Conf.	Away team	Result	Home team	Venue	Attendance	Free TV	Viewers	Ref
Sat, 06. July	IC	Vienna Vikings	27 – 19	Raiders Tirol	Tivoli Stadion Tirol	3,624			
Sat, 06. July	Central	Munich Ravens	54 – 0	Barcelona Dragons	Estadi Municipal de Badalona	750			
Sat, 06. July	Central	Milano Seamen	10 – 16	Helvetic Mercenaries	Sportzentrum Kleinfeld	753			
Sat, 06. July	Western	Frankfurt Galaxy	15 – 46	Madrid Bravos	Estadio de Vallehermoso	1,102			
Sun, 07. July	Eastern	Berlin Thunder	47 – 0	Féhervár Enthroners	First Field	1,200			
Sun, 07. July	Western	Hamburg Sea Devils	18 – 41	Paris Musketeers	Stade Jean-Bouin	3,500			
Sun, 07. July	Eastern	Prague Lions	3 – 14	Wroclaw Panthers	Stadion Olimpijski	4,447			
Sun, 07. July	Western	Cologne Centurions	9 – 62	Rhein Fire	Schauinsland-Reisen-Arena	13,097			
Bye		Stuttgart Surge							

==== Week 8 ====
Date/Time (CEST)	Conf.	Away team	Result	Home team	Venue	Attendance	Free TV	Viewers	Ref
Sat, 13. July	Eastern	Féhervár Enthroners	38 – 6	Prague Lions	Atletický stadion SK Slavia Praha	647			
Sat, 13. July	Western	Cologne Centurions	35 – 28	Frankfurt Galaxy	PSD Bank Arena	5,594			
Sat, 13. July	IC	Helvetic Mercenaries	40 – 49	Vienna Vikings	Wiener Neustadt Ergo Arena	3,007			
Sat, 13. July	IC	Madrid Bravos	54 – 0	Barcelona Dragons	Estadi Municipal de Badalona	1,918			
Sun, 14. July	IC	Berlin Thunder	27 – 35	Paris Musketeers	Stade Jean-Bouin	3,200			
Sun, 14. July	Western	Rhein Fire	61 – 23	Hamburg Sea Devils	Volksparkstadion	25,366			
Sun, 14. July	Central	Stuttgart Surge	30 – 25	Raiders Tirol	Tivoli Stadion Tirol	3,112			
Bye		Milano Seamen, Munich Ravens, Wroclaw Panthers							

==== Week 9 ====
Date/Time (CEST)	Conf.	Away team	Result	Home team	Venue	Attendance	Free TV	Viewers	Ref
Sat, 20. July	IC	Milano Seamen	17 – 27	Féhervár Enthroners	First Field	1,800			
Sun, 21. July	Eastern	Vienna Vikings	34 – 9	Berlin Thunder	Friedrich-Ludwig-Jahn-Sportpark	3,740			
Sun, 21. July	Western	Paris Musketeers	29 – 13	Madrid Bravos	Estadio de Vallehermoso	983			
Sun, 21. July	IC	Panthers Wroclaw	0 – 40	Stuttgart Surge	Gazi-Stadion auf der Waldau	4,023			
Sun, 21. July	Central	Helvetic Mercenaries	23 – 55	Munich Ravens	Uhlsport Park	3,327			
Sun, 21. July	Western	Frankfurt Galaxy	13 – 48	Rhein Fire	Schauinsland-Reisen-Arena	13,473			
Sun, 21. July	Western	Hamburg Sea Devils	25 – 32	Cologne Centurions	Tivoli	2,198			
Bye		Barcelona Dragons, Raiders Tirol, Prague Lions							

==== Week 10 ====
Date/Time (CEST)	Conf.	Away team	Result	Home team	Venue	Attendance	Free TV	Viewers	Ref
Sat, 27. July	Eastern	Féhervár Enthroners	12 – 62	Wroclaw Panthers	Stadion Olimpijski	2,346			
Sat, 27. July	Eastern	Prague Lions	23 – 62	Vienna Vikings	Wiener Neustadt Ergo Arena	3,274			
Sat, 27. July	Central	Stuttgart Surge	71 – 7	Barcelona Dragons	Estadi Municipal de Badalona	684			
Sat, 27. July	Western	Cologne Centurions	0 – 37	Madrid Bravos	Estadio de Vallehermoso	954			
Sun, 28. July	Western	Paris Musketeers	6 – 38	Rhein Fire	Schauinsland-Reisen-Arena	10,324			
Sun, 28. July	Central	Milano Seamen	30 – 69	Munich Ravens	Uhlsport Park	3,617			
Sun, 28. July	Central	Helvetic Mercenaries	28 – 42	Raiders Tirol	Tivoli Stadion Tirol	2,721			
Sun, 28. July	Western	Frankfurt Galaxy	40 – 23	Hamburg Sea Devils	Heinz von Heiden Arena	8,348			
Bye		Berlin Thunder							

==== Week 11 ====
Date/Time (CEST)	Conf.	Away team	Result	Home team	Venue	Attendance	Free TV	Viewers	Ref
Sat, 3. August	IC	Vienna Vikings	49 – 3	Helvetic Mercenaries	Sportzentrum Kleinfeld	1,205			
Sat, 3. August	Western	Hamburg Sea Devils	9 – 52	Madrid Bravos	Estadio de Vallehermoso	1,304			
Sat, 3. August	Central	Stuttgart Surge	51 – 18	Milano Seamen	Velodromo Maspes-Vigorelli	837			
Sun, 04. August	Western	Frankfurt Galaxy	37 – 43	Cologne Centurions	Südstadion	1,501			
Sun, 04. August	IC	Paris Musketeers	40 – 37	Berlin Thunder	Friedrich-Ludwig-Jahn-Sportpark	2,710			
Sun, 04. August	IC	Munich Ravens	47 – 14	Prague Lions	Atletický stadion SK Slavia Praha	419			
Bye		Rhein Fire, Raiders Tirol, Barcelona Dragons, Féhervár Enthroners, Panthers Wroclaw							

==== Week 12 ====
Date/Time (CEST)	Conf.	Away team	Result	Home team	Venue	Attendance	Free TV	Viewers	Ref
Sat, 10. August	Eastern	Prague Lions	9 – 6	Féhervár Enthroners	First Field	1,600			
Sat, 10. August	Western	Madrid Bravos	20 – 37	Frankfurt Galaxy	PSD Bank Arena	5,222			
Sun, 11. August	Central	Raiders Tirol	45 – 42	Stuttgart Surge	Gazi-Stadion auf der Waldau	4,028			
Sun, 11. August	Western	Paris Musketeers	57 – 7	Cologne Centurions	Südstadion	748			
Sun, 11. August	Central	Barcelona Dragons	0 – 90	Munich Ravens	Uhlsport Park	3,488			
Sun, 11. August	Eastern	Panthers Wroclaw	34 – 36	Berlin Thunder	Friedrich-Ludwig-Jahn-Sportpark	2,731			
Sun, 11. August	Western	Hamburg Sea Devils	2 – 51	Rhein Fire	Schauinsland-Reisen-Arena	10,734			
Bye		Milano Seamen, Helvetic Mercenaries, Vienna Vikings							

==== Week 13 ====
Date/Time (CEST)	Conf.	Away team	Result	Home team	Venue	Attendance	Free TV	Viewers	Ref
Sat, 17. August	Western	Madrid Bravos	12 – 15	Paris Musketeers	Stade Jean-Bouin	3,000			
Sat, 17. August	Central	Milano Seamen	0 – 30	Raiders Tirol	Tivoli Stadion Tirol	3,815			
Sat, 17. August	Eastern	Féhervár Enthroners	0 – 46	Vienna Vikings	Wiener Neustadt Ergo Arena	3,189			
Sat, 17. August	Central	Munich Ravens	38 – 13	Helvetic Mercenaries	Sportzentrum Kleinfeld	946			
Sun, 18. August	IC	Frankfurt Galaxy	19 – 54	Wroclaw Panthers	Stadion Olimpijski	5,049			
Sun, 18. August	Central	Barcelona Dragons	0 – 56	Stuttgart Surge	Gazi-Stadion auf der Waldau	2,846			
Sun, 18. August	Western	Cologne Centurions	30 – 23	Hamburg Sea Devils	Eilenriedestadion	2,479			
Sun, 18. August	IC	Berlin Thunder	17 – 47	Rhein Fire	Schauinsland-Reisen-Arena	12,580			
Bye		Prague Lions							

==== Week 14 ====
Date/Time (CEST)	Conf.	Away team	Result	Home team	Venue	Attendance	Free TV	Viewers	Ref
Sat, 24. August	IC	Cologne Centurions	51 – 28	Féhervár Enthroners	First Field	1,200			
Sat, 24. August	Western	Madrid Bravos	63 – 13	Hamburg Sea Devils	Stadion Šubićevac	2,532			
Sat, 24. August	Central	Stuttgart Surge	61 – 7	Helvetic Mercenaries	Sportzentrum Kleinfeld	1,011			
Sat, 24. August	Central	Barcelona Dragons	36 – 57	Milano Seamen	Velodromo Maspes-Vigorelli	650			
Sun, 25. August	Western	Paris Musketeers	44 – 10	Frankfurt Galaxy	PSD Bank Arena	7,025			
Sun, 25. August	Eastern	Wroclaw Panthers	17 – 7	Prague Lions	Atletický stadion SK Slavia Praha	470			
Sun, 25. August	Central	Raiders Tirol	3 – 30	Munich Ravens	Uhlsport Park	5,012			
Bye		Rhein Fire, Berlin Thunder, Vienna Vikings							

== Standings ==
Western Conference
Pos	Team	GP	W	L	CONF	PF	PA	DIFF	STK	Qualification
1	(Germany) Rhein Fire	12	11	1	9–1	476	174	+302	W9	Automatic playoffs (#3)
2	(France) Paris Musketeers	12	10	2	8–2	407	242	+165	W4	Advance to playoffs (#4)
3	(Spain) Madrid Bravos	12	8	4	6–4	411	204	+207	W1	Advance to playoffs (#6)
4	(Germany) Cologne Centurions	12	6	6	4–6	303	444	-141	W2	
5	(Germany) Frankfurt Galaxy	12	4	8	3–7	285	397	-112	L2	
6	(Germany) Hamburg Sea Devils	12	2	10	0–10	226	473	-247	L9	

Source: europeanleague.football

Central Conference
Pos	Team	GP	W	L	CONF	PF	PA	DIFF	STK	Qualification
1	(Germany) Stuttgart Surge	12	11	1	9–1	565	179	+386	W2	Automatic playoffs (#2)
2	(Germany) Munich Ravens	12	9	3	7–3	534	191	+343	W7	Advance to playoffs (#5)
3	(Austria) Raiders Tirol	12	8	4	8–2	359	227	+132	L1	
4	(Italy) Milano Seamen	12	4	8	3–7	208	402	-194	W1	
5	(Spain) Barcelona Dragons	12	2	10	2–8	117	577	-460	L8	
6	(Switzerland) Helvetic Mercenaries	12	1	11	1–9	185	438	-253	L6	

Source: europeanleague.football

Eastern Conference
Pos	Team	GP	W	L	CONF	PF	PA	DIFF	STK	Qualification
1	(Austria) Vienna Vikings	12	12	0	8–0	457	179	+278	W12	Automatic playoffs (#1)
2	(Poland) Panthers Wrocław	12	6	6	5–3	356	285	+71	W2	
3	(Germany) Berlin Thunder	12	5	7	5–3	378	318	+60	L1	
4	(Hungary) Fehérvár Enthroners	12	2	10	1–7	168	422	-254	L4	
5	(Czech Republic) Prague Lions	12	1	11	1–7	134	417	-283	L1	

Source: europeanleague.football

Overall standings
#	Team	Division	W	L	PCT	CONF	PD	STK
Conference leaders
1	(Austria) Vienna Vikings	East	12	0	1.000	8–0	+278	W12
2	(Germany) Stuttgart Surge	Central	11	1	.917	9–1	+386	W2
3	(Germany) Rhein Fire	West	11	1	.917	9–1	+302	W9
Wild cards
4	(France) Paris Musketeers	West	10	2	.833	8–2	+165	W4
5	(Germany) Munich Ravens	Central	9	3	.750	7–3	+343	W7
6	(Spain) Madrid Bravos	West	8	4	.667	6–4	+207	W1
Not Qualified for the Playoffs
7	(Austria) Raiders Tirol	Central	8	4	.667	8–2	+132	L1
8	(Poland) Panthers Wrocław	East	6	6	.500	5–3	+71	W2
9	(Germany) Cologne Centurions	West	6	6	.500	4–6	-141	W2
10	(Germany) Berlin Thunder	East	5	7	.417	5–3	+60	L1
11	(Germany) Frankfurt Galaxy	West	4	8	.333	3–7	-112	L2
12	(Italy) Milano Seamen	Central	4	8	.333	3–7	-194	W1
13	(Germany) Hamburg Sea Devils	West	2	10	.167	0–10	-247	L9
14	(Hungary) Fehérvár Enthroners	East	2	10	.167	1–7	-254	L4
15	(Spain) Barcelona Dragons	Central	2	10	.167	2–8	-460	L8
16	(Switzerland) Helvetic Mercenaries	Central	1	11	.083	1–9	-253	L6
17	(Czech Republic) Prague Lions	East	1	11	.083	1–7	-283	L1

In case ties inside and between the conferences have to be broken, the rules are:

1. Number of wins
2. Head-to-head matchup (Note: Only applicable if matchups have taken place and with additional rules)
3. Points difference in head-to-head matchups
4. Points scored at away games of head-to-head matchups
5. Total points difference
6. Total points scored
7. Point scored at away games
8. Coin toss performed by the Commissioner or a person (e.g., a prominent sportsmen) determined by the Commissioner

== Play-offs ==
The wildcard games were played on August 31 and September 01, the semifinals on September 07 and 08, and the final was held on September 22, 2024, in Gelsenkirchen, Germany.

Wildcard
4	(France) Paris Musketeers	40
5	(Germany) Munich Ravens	37
3	(Germany) Rhein Fire	40
6	(Spain) Madrid Bravos	10

Semifinals
1	(Austria) Vienna Vikings	47
4	(France) Paris Musketeers	31
2	(Germany) Stuttgart Surge	23
3	(Germany) Rhein Fire	29

Championship Game
1	(Austria) Vienna Vikings	20
3	(Germany) Rhein Fire	51

=== Wildcard ===
==== Paris Musketeers 40, Munich Ravens 37 ====
Munich Ravens vs. Paris Musketeers

Quarter	1	2	3	4	Total
Ravens	7	7	16	7	37
Musketeers	6	13	8	13	40

at Stade du Hainaut, Valenciennes, France

- Date: 31 August
- Game time: 15:15 CEST
- Game attendance: 3,000
- Referee: T. Thoardarson

==== Rhein Fire 40, Madrid Bravos 10 ====
Madrid Bravos vs. Rhein Fire

Quarter	1	2	3	4	Total
Bravos	3	7	0	0	10
Fire	20	14	6	0	40

at Schauinsland-Reisen-Arena, Duisburg, Germany

- Date: 1 September 2024
- Game time: 15:15 CEST
- Game attendance: 7,149
- Referee: J. Haentjens

=== Semi Finals ===
==== Vienna Vikings 47, Paris Musketeers 31 ====
Paris Musketeers vs. Vienna Vikings

Quarter	1	2	3	4	Total
Musketeers	6	0	18	7	31
Vikings	7	14	13	13	47

at Generali Arena Vienna, Vienna, Austria

- Date: 7 September 2024
- Game time: 15:15 CEST
- Game attendance: 10,981
- Referee: F. Kristensen

==== Stuttgart Surge 23, Rhein Fire 29 ====
Rhein Fire vs. Stuttgart Surge

Quarter	1	2	3	4	OT	Total
Fire	7	6	0	10	6	29
Surge	13	7	0	3	0	23

at Gazi-Stadion auf der Waldau, Stuttgart, Germany

- Date: 8 September 2024
- Game time: 15:15 CEST
- Game attendance: 5,427
- Referee: K. Walentynowicz

=== Championship Game ===
==== Vienna Vikings 20, Rhein Fire 51 ====
Vienna Vikings vs. Rhein Fire

Quarter	1	2	3	4	Total
Fire	7	23	7	14	51
Vikings	6	7	0	7	20

at Veltins-Arena, Gelsenkirchen, Germany

- Date: 22 September 2024
- Game time: 15:30 CEST
- Game attendance: 41,364
- Referee: M. Scholz

== Attendance ==
As of August 28, 2024

Pos	Team	Total	High	Low	Average	Change
1	Rhein Fire	68,354	13,473	8,146	11,392	+16.2%
2	Hamburg Sea Devils	55,663	25,366	2,479	9,277	+13.6%
3	Frankfurt Galaxy	42,586	13,586	5,222	7,098	+6.6%
4	Panthers Wrocław	35,952	15,128	2,346	5,992	+135.0%
5	Vienna Vikings	32,198	10,919	2,795	5,366	+32.7%
6	Munich Ravens	30,217	10,822	3,327	5,036	+0.5%
7	Stuttgart Surge	25,506	8,432	2,846	4,251	+9.0%
8	Berlin Thunder	20,736	4,759	2,710	3,456	−24.3%
9	Paris Musketeers	20,723	4,523	3,000	3,454	−14.6%
10	Raiders Tirol	20,222	4,011	2,721	3,370	−13.7%
11	Cologne Centurions	16,411	8,558	748	2,735	−1.4%
12	Fehérvár Enthroners	9,300	2,000	1,200	1,550	−11.9%
13	Madrid Bravos	8,360	2,071	954	1,393	n/a
14	Helvetic Mercenaries	6,165	1,250	753	1,028	n/a
15	Barcelona Dragons	5,524	1,122	500	921	−14.8%
16	Milano Seamen	4,437	1,000	500	740	−32.7%
17	Prague Lions	3,828	1,075	419	638	−19.9%
	League total	406,182	25,366	419	3,982	+1.7%

== Signees to other professional leagues ==
The following players invited to the NFL’s International Combine, assigned to NFL's International Player Pathway Program (IPPP), signed or drafted by CFL team or signed with UFL team following their involvement with the ELF in 2024:

=== NFL ===
Player	Position	ELF team	NFL team
Leander Wiegand	OT	Munich Ravens	International Player Pathway
Lenny Krieg	K	Stuttgart Surge	International Player Pathway
Bastian Roppelt	P	Frankfurt Galaxy	International Player Pathway
Maceo Beard	DB	Paris Musketeers	International Player Pathway

== Broadcasting ==
Selected games are available on free TV in most of the participating countries. For the Austrian and German market, the league's main broadcasting partner is ProSiebenSat.1 Media. In Germany ProSieben MAXX and their online-streaming service ran.de airs games on Saturday and Sunday. All games are also available worldwide on ELF Gamepass.

Region(s)	Broadcaster(s)
International	ELF Gamepass
Germany; Austria; Switzerland	ProSieben Maxx ranSport; More Than Sports TV
France	beIN Sports
