= American football at the 2017 World Games – Men's team rosters =

== Rosters ==
| Poland | France | Germany | United States |
| | Pierre Courageux; Aymeric Dethelot; Edris Jean-Alphons; Jérémy Duponchelle; Alexandre Le Gallo; Paul Durand; Andrew James; Victor Ferrier; Stéphane Fortes; Anthony Alix; Charles Delaroque; Yann Dika-Balotoken; Vincent Begou; Stephen Yepmo; Sébastien Sejean; Murphy Balame-Putu; Nicolas Khandar; Armel Ahidazan; Souleymane Karamoko; Sandy Marcin; Brice Rontet; Maxime Roger; Robin Sebeille; Claudio Jacquin; Matthieu Fayard; Kévin Mwamba; Giovanni Nanguy; Etienne Roudel; Averdie Mizius; Romain Faucon; Raphaël Kidari; Nyohor Badiane; Doums Doumbouya; Jean-Amour Fazer; Jean-Philippe Eldin; Bastien Pereira; Willy N'Kishi; Arnaud Montgenie; Olivier Bordin; Nelson Tsimi; Jeff Alexandre; Pierrick Autret; Valentin Gnahoua; Mehdi Bekheira; Robin Mouton | Thiadric Hansen; Richard Grooten; Benjamin Mau; Aurieus Adegbesan; Sebastian Silva Gomez; Till Janssen; Paul Zimmermann; Tissi Robinson; Sonny Weishaupt; Alexander Haupert; Jason Owuso; Yannick Baumgärtner; Jan Abrahamsen; Christian Köppe; Jazan Yassar; Joshua Poznanski; Marc Scherenberg; Tobias Nick; Patrick Poetsch; Donnie Avant; Levi Kruse; Kerim Homri; David Müller; Leon Helm; Simon Brenner; Moritz Meis; Hermann Schramm; Robin Fensch; Jan Lanser; Philipp Tolksdorf; Yannick Kiehl; Thomas Schmidt; Aaron Wahl; Harald Binczek; Lane Acheampong; Kwame Ofori; Mike Schallo; Nicolai Schumann; Hendrick Hinrichs; Maximilian Wild; Thomas Rauch; Marc Anthony Hor; Paul Seemann; Sven Rieger; Simon Gavanda; Peter Arentsen | Player name (college program); Deante Battle (Northwestern); Oscar Vazquez-Dyer (Bluffton University); Cam Countryman (Pennsylvania); Dustin Hawke Willingham (Arkansas/Southwest Baptist); Demetrius (Meech) Eaton (Northwestern); Terry Gaitor (Webber International); Davarus Shores (Texas A&M–Commerce); Lamar Hall (Murray State); Tyrell Blanks (Coastal Carolina); Mike Van Deripe (Southwestern Oklahoma State); Mario Brown (Trine University); Austin Jones (Portland State); Cody Smith (Arizona); Taylor Palmer; T. J. Richardson (Millersville University); Preston Rabb (West Texas A&M); Anthony Benson Jr. (Southwestern CC (Iowa)/Friends University); Brett Perkins (Southwestern Oregon CC); Triston McCathern (Faulkner University); Joe Bergeron (Texas/Texas A&M–Commerce); Gary Stevenson (Long Beach City College/Phoenix College); Billy Carlile (Gilroy High School (California)); John Moorhead (George Mason); Ryan Seaberg (Southern Mississippi); Nick Reyna (Ferris State); Zachary Blair (Virginia–Wise); Patrick Fitzgerald (Western Carolina/C.W. Post); John van Vliet (Idaho State); Jebrai Regan (Gardner–Webb); Randall Jackson-Clemons (Georgetown College (Kentucky)); Dante Cattaneo (Lamar); Eric Janeau (Southern University); Zakkary Packard (Hartwick College); Giuliano Cattaneo (Texas State); Nick Sweet (Marcos de Niza High School (Arizona)); Artur Zaniewski (Sacramento State) |
