= 2024 Paris Musketeers season =

French American football team season

- General manager: Marc-Angelo Soumah
- Head coach: Marc Mattioli
- Home stadium: Stade Jean Bouin

Results
- Record: 10-2
- Conference place: 2
- Playoffs: lost semi final at Vienna Vikings

The 2024 Paris Musketeers season was the second season of the Paris Musketeers team in the European League of Football for the 2024 season.

== Preseason ==
In the offseason the Musketeers were able to bring in more French players from other ELF teams. They signed the 2023 ELF Defensive Player of the Year Macéo Beard (Helvetic Guards), and 2023 All Star Anthony Mahoungou (Rhein Fire).

== Regular season ==
Due to the Stade Jean-Bouin serving as "German House" during the 2024 Summer Olympics, the Musketeers had to play all six home games in the first six weeks to the regular season. Paris won ten games, only the two matches versus defending champion Rhein Fire were lost. They finished second in the Western Conference and moved to the wild card round.

=== Standings ===
Western Conference
Pos	Team	GP	W	L	CONF	PF	PA	DIFF	STK	Qualification
1	(Germany) Rhein Fire	12	11	1	9–1	476	174	+302	W9	Automatic playoffs (#3)
2	(France) Paris Musketeers	12	10	2	8–2	407	242	+165	W4	Advance to playoffs (#4)
3	(Spain) Madrid Bravos	12	8	4	6–4	411	204	+207	W1	Advance to playoffs (#6)
4	(Germany) Cologne Centurions	12	6	6	4–6	303	444	-141	W2	
5	(Germany) Frankfurt Galaxy	12	4	8	3–7	285	397	-112	L2	
6	(Germany) Hamburg Sea Devils	12	2	10	0–10	226	473	-247	L9	

Source: europeanleague.football

== Playoffs ==
In the wild card round, the Musketeers had a home game, which was played in the Northern French city of Valenciennes, northern France had home rights, as 2024 Summer Paralympics were going on in Paris. The Musketeers played the Munich Ravens, and won with a narrow 40:37. In the semi finals, the Musketeers traveled to Vienna, where they lost versus Eastern Conference champions Vienna Vikings with 31:47.

== Roster ==
Paris Musketeers roster
Quarterbacks: 1 (United States) Zach Edwards; Running backs: 2 (France) Jason Aguemon; 21 (France) Jean-Charles ‘Sanka’ Moukouri; 45 (France) Chris Voumbo; Wide receivers: 10 (France) Jefferson Alexandre; 5 (France) Rémi Bertellin; 13 (France) Florian Larose; 11 (France) Anthony Mahoungou; 6 (United States) Austin Mitchell; 14 (France) Cheikhou Sow; 12 (France) Hugo Tekedam; Tight ends: 81 (France) Kevin Mwamba	Offensive linemen: 70 (France) Nyohor Badiane; 71 (France) Thomas Fileccia; 65 (France) Jeremy Gasparro; 77 (United Kingdom) Toby Lettman; 50 (France) Nabil Marzougui; 72 (France) Wally Camara; 68 (Brazil) Pollys Sacramento; 63 (United Kingdom) Lewis Thomas; Defensive linemen: 90 (France) Vincent Buffet; 98 (France) Edwin Élio; 94 (France) Valentin Gnahoua; 43 (Australia) Jack Loew; 97 (France) Averdié Mizius; 55 (France) Mamadou Sy; 44 (France) Stanley Zeregbe; 91 (Sweden) Aslan Zetterberg	Linebackers: 42 (United States) Dauson Dales; 8 (Sweden) Jordan Genmark Heath; 4 (France) Digaan Gomis Katchanga; 19 (France) Sofiane Khezami; 41 (France) Davidson Larochel; 35 (France) Paul Véritas; Defensive backs: 27 (France) Maeric Achiepi; 7 (France) Maceo Beard; 26 (France) Jean-Alphonse Edris; 9 (France) Kenny Floret; 0 (United States) Chandler Jones; 3 (France) Amir Kilani; 28 (France) Vincent Lemoine; 23 (France) Khefil Osseni; 29 (France) Kevin Querido Dias; 36 (France) Maxime Roger; 20 (France) Wadjihe Said; Special teams: 30 (France) Mathys Dupont	Practice squad: 17 (France) Randy Abandzounou DL; 16 (France) Ibel Ahidazan DB; 15 (France) Anthony Alix K/P; 95 (France) Christopher Attoungbre DL; 89 (France) Jordan Avissey DL; 47 (France) Yohan Bique DL; 18 (France) Yassine Bouhmidi QB; 88 (France) Francois Bremond WR; 99 (France) Willem Dendelé DL; - (France) Moustapha Diawara OL; - (France) Comblé Eldjimbaye OL; 40 (France) Djilan Eustache LB; 78 (France) Max Gaye OL; 92 (Lebanon) Ali Hayek DL; 85 (France) Sirac Kougnaglo WR; 73 (France) Elyes Saoui OL; 75 (France) Laïc Vontie OL; Rookies in italics Roster updated June 2, 2024; 4 A-import, 6 E-import, 53 homegrown 46 active, 17 practice squad
