= 2024 Berlin Thunder season =

2024 Berlin Thunder (ELF) season
- General manager: Diana Hoge
- Head coach: (Germany) Johnny Schmuck
- Home stadium: Friedrich-Ludwig-Jahn-Sportpark

Uniform

The 2024 Berlin Thunder season is the fourth season of the Berlin Thunder team in the European League of Football and the second season in the Eastern Conference of the ELF.

== Preseason ==
In the 2023 ELF Play-offs and the defeat against Frankfurt Galaxy, the franchise in the German capital began early to regroup the team. The team MVP 2023 and sack-leader of the 2023 European League of Football season was the first announced re-signing. Multiple other signings followed suit, with the most notable new signing of quarterback Jakeb Sullivan.

The first on field workout was held in mid December 2023 in Berlin.

== Regular season ==
=== Standings ===
Eastern Conference
Pos	Team	GP	W	L	CONF	PF	PA	DIFF	STK	Qualification
1	(Austria) Vienna Vikings	12	12	0	8–0	457	179	+278	W12	Automatic playoffs (#1)
2	(Poland) Panthers Wrocław	12	6	6	5–3	356	285	+71	W2	
3	(Germany) Berlin Thunder	12	5	7	5–3	378	318	+60	L1	
4	(Hungary) Fehérvár Enthroners	12	2	10	1–7	168	422	-254	L4	
5	(Czech Republic) Prague Lions	12	1	11	1–7	134	417	-283	L1	

Source: europeanleague.football

=== Schedule ===
Week	Date	Opponent (Note: Intra-Conference games are in italics)	Result	Record	Venue	Att.	Recap
1	Sun, May 26	@ Panthers Wrocław	L 39-49	0-1	Olympic Stadium Wrocław	15,128	
2	Sun, June 2	Prague Lions	W 48-17	1-1	Friedrich-Ludwig-Jahn-Sportpark	3,758	
3	Sun, June 9	Fehérvár Enthroners	W 34-3	2-1	Friedrich-Ludwig-Jahn-Sportpark	3,038	
4	Sat, June 15	@ Vienna Vikings	L 20-25	2-2	Hohe Warte Stadium	9,014	
5	Sun, June 23	Rhein Fire	L 24-27	2-3	Friedrich-Ludwig-Jahn-Sportpark	4,759	
6	Sat, June 29	@ Prague Lions	W 34-7	3-3	Městský stadion, Ústí nad Labem	467	
7	Sat, July 6	@ Fehérvár Enthroners	W 47-0	4-3	First Field	1,200	
8	Sun, July 14	@ Paris Musketeers	L 27-35	4-4	Stade Jean-Bouin	3,200	
9	Sun, July 21	Vienna Vikings	L 9-34	4-5	Friedrich-Ludwig-Jahn-Sportpark	3,740	
10	July 27/28	bye					
11	Sun, August 4	Paris Musketeers	L 37-40	4-6	Friedrich-Ludwig-Jahn-Sportpark	2,710	
12	Sun, August 11	Panthers Wrocław	W 36-34	5-6	Friedrich-Ludwig-Jahn-Sportpark	2,731	
13	Sun, August 18	@ Rhein Fire	L 14-47	5-7	Schauinsland-Reisen-Arena	12,580	
14	August 24/25	bye					

Source: europeanleague.football

== Roster ==
Berlin Thunder (ELF) roster
Quarterbacks: Jakeb Sullivan 🇺🇸; Running backs: Ali Khalife 🇩🇪; Wide receivers: 4 Aaron Jackson 🇺🇸; 7 Robin Wilzeck 🇩🇪; Tight ends: 85 Nicolai Schumann 🇩🇪	Offensive linemen: 75 Felix Lepper 🇩🇪; Lucas Lavin 🇸🇪; Harry Sayer 🇬🇧; Defensive linemen: 1 Emil Hovde 🇸🇪; 45 Kyle Kitchens DE 🇺🇸; 90 Ben Baierl DT 🇩🇪; 99 Aaron Große Kleimann 🇩🇪; Serif Djibrilla 🇩🇪	Linebackers: 8 Paul Seifert OLB 🇩🇪; 11 Ludvig Myrén OLB 🇸🇪; Defensive backs: 15 Moritz Thiele CB 🇩🇪; 30 Alex Spillum S 🇺🇸; 32 Viljo Lempinen 🇫🇮; Simon Otto 🇩🇪	Rookies in italics Roster updated January 16, 2024; 4 A-import, 5 E-import, 10 homegrown 19 active, 0 practice squad

== Staff ==
Berlin Thunder (ELF) staff
Front office: Owner – FBG Football Berlin GmbH; CEO – Levon Melikian; General Manager – Diana Hoge; Director of football – Björn Werner; Head of operations – Marcus Döbler; Head coach: Head coach – Johnny Schmuck; Offensive coaches: Offensive coordinator – Henry Schlegel; Quarterbacks – N/A; Running backs – N/A; Wide receivers/tight ends/fullbacks – N/A; Offensive line – Ron Bauerfeind	Defensive coaches: Defensive coordinator – Christopher Kuhfeldt; Assis. DC and defensive backs – José Schmitt; Defensive line – Mario Baierl; Linebackers – Simon Bohlmann; Special teams coaches: Special teams coordinator – Jörg Bauerfeind; Assistant coaches: Offensive assistant – N/A; Mental coach – N/A; Strength and conditioning: Head athletic coach – Christopher Kuhfeldt; Staff updated 16 January 2024
