= Valentin Gnahoua =

French gridiron football player (born 1994)

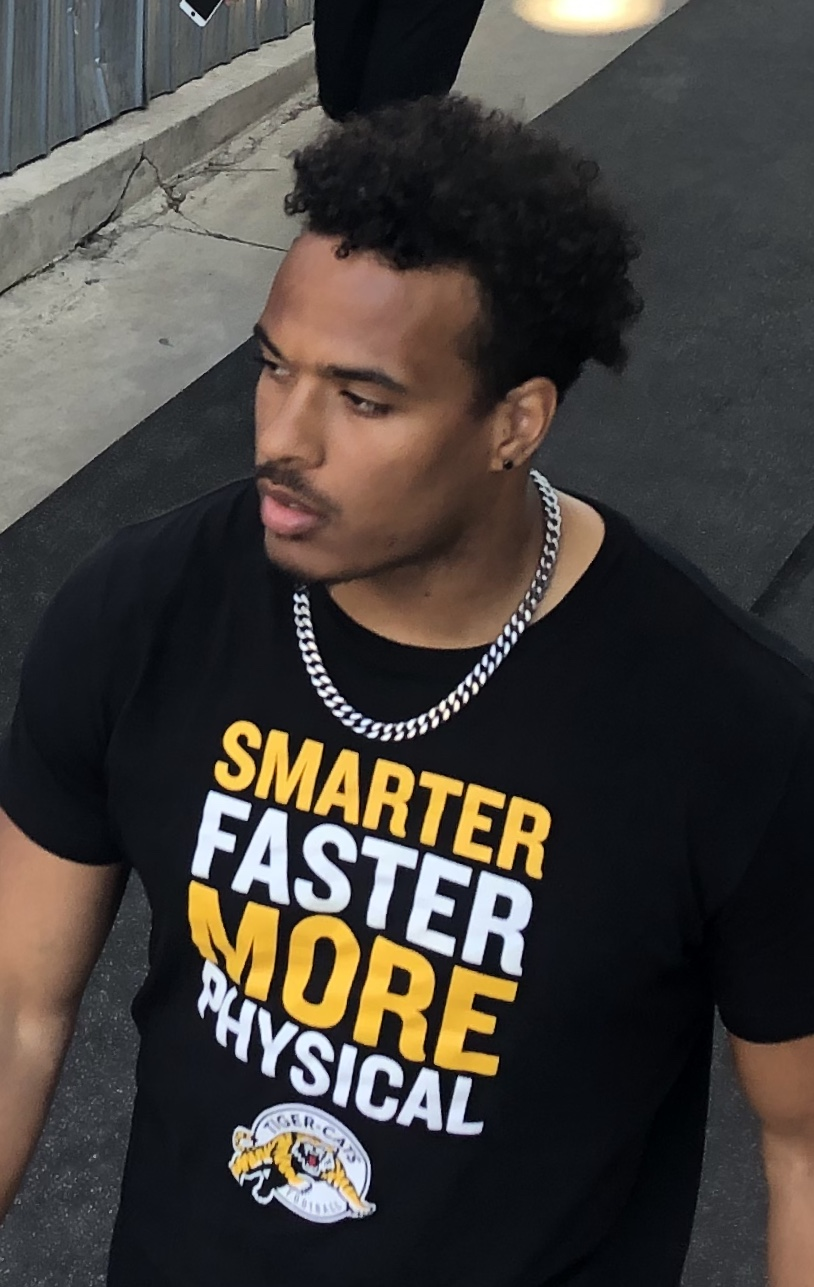
- Gnahoua before a Tiger-Cats game in 2019

Paris Lights
- Position: Defensive end
- Roster status: Active
- CFL status: Global

Personal information
- Born: September 29, 1994 (age 32); Le Mans, France
- Listed height: 6 ft 2 in (1.88 m)
- Listed weight: 235 lb (107 kg)

Career information
- University: McGill
- CFL draft: 2019 Euro: 1st round, 1st overall pick

Career history
- 2011–2016; 2017: Caïmans 72 du Mans
- 2017: Berlin Rebels
- 2018: Blue Stars de Marseille
- 2018: Berlin Rebels
- 2019–2022: Hamilton Tiger-Cats
- 2023: Saskatchewan Roughriders*
- 2023: Paris Musketeers
- 2023: Hamilton Tiger-Cats*
- 2024–2025: Paris Musketeers
- 2026–present: Paris Lights
- * Offseason or practice squad member only

Career CFL statistics
- Total tackles: 12
- Sacks: 0
- Interceptions: 0
- Stats at CFL.ca

Valentin Gnahoua
Medal record

Men's American football

Representing France

World Games
Gold medal – first place	2017 Wrocław	Team

European Championship
Bronze medal – third place	2014 Austria	Team

European Junior Championship
Bronze medal – third place	2013 Germany	Team

Valentin Gnahoua (born September 29, 1994) is a French professional gridiron football defensive end for the Paris Lights of the American Football League Europe (AFLE). He was the first overall pick by the Hamilton Tiger-Cats in the 2019 CFL European draft. Gnahoua has also been a member of the Berlin Rebels of the German Football League (GFL), the Saskatchewan Roughriders of the Canadian Football League (CFL), and the Paris Musketeers of the European League of Football (ELF).

== Early life ==
Gnahoua began playing American football in 2011, joining a local semi-pro team, the Le Mans Caimans 72 (French: Caïmens 72 du Mans), as a sixteen-year old. He was drawn to the sport after watching a National Football League game on television with his cousin and had his first practice with the Caïmans three days later. Without any cleats of his own, he first practiced in Air Jordans.

In 2016, he arrived in Canada, playing one season of collegiate football for the McGill Redmen before a sudden increase in international student tuition forced him to return to France. In his sole season at McGill, he played nine games and recorded 24 tackles, four tackles for loss, one sack and one fumble recovery.

== Professional career ==
=== Return to France and Berlin Rebels ===
Gnahoua rejoined the Caïmans 72 du Mans in France in 2017, playing well enough early on in the campaign to get signed by the Berlin Rebels of the German Football League (GFL) midway through the 2017 GFL season. In seven games that season, he registered 25 solo tackles, 13 tackles for loss, and seven sacks. Gnahoua began the 2018 season with the Blue Stars de Marseille in France, helping them reach the league semifinals, before returning to the Berlin Rebels to finish the 2018 GFL season.

=== Hamilton Tiger-Cats ===
In 2019, he was announced as one of the 18 European players invited to the 2019 CFL Combine in Toronto. The following month, in April, he was selected by the Hamilton Tiger-Cats as the first overall pick in the inaugural European CFL draft, part of commissioner Randy Ambrosie's initiative to grow the league's presence internationally. He began the season as a member of the practice squad, but made his debut during their week 9 matchup against the BC Lions on August 10, recovering an onside kick that led to a second-quarter field goal in the 35-34 victory. The Tiger-Cats reached the 107th Grey Cup, where they lost to the Winnipeg Blue Bombers.

Gnahoua signed a contract extension with the Tiger-Cats on December 29, 2020. He was placed on the suspended list on July 19, 2021, but was later activated and played in the first regular season game of 2021.

Gnahoua became a free agent upon the expiry of his contract on February 14, 2023. In three seasons with the team, he played 38 games and recorded one defensive tackle, 11 special teams tackles, one forced fumble, and one blocked punt.

=== Saskatchewan Roughriders ===
On February 17, 2023, it was announced that Gnahoua had signed with the Saskatchewan Roughriders. During training camp, he was released by the team on May 17 to reach the 75-man roster limit.

=== Paris Musketeers ===
On June 15, 2023, Gnahoua signed with the Paris Musketeers of the European League of Football (ELF). He was cut in mid-July, prior to their week 7 matchup.

=== Hamilton Tiger-Cats (second stint) ===
On July 10, 2023, Gnahoua re-signed with the Hamilton Tiger-Cats as a member of their practice roster. He was subsequently released on November 5.

=== Paris Musketeers (second stint) ===
Gnahoua returned to the Paris Musketeers for two additional seasons in 2024 and 2025.

== National team career ==
After a successful tryout at age 16, Gnahoua was selected to the France national under-19 team and subsequently played at the 2012 IFAF U-19 World Championship in Austin, Texas. He helped the team win a bronze medal at the 2013 European Junior Championship. Gnahoua made his debut for the senior national team in 2014, helping France win a bronze medal at the European Championship held in Austria. He was called up again the following year for the 2015 IFAF World Championship, held in Canton, Ohio. Gnahoua led France to a gold medal at the 2017 World Games.

== Personal life ==
His father was a professional association football (soccer) player who was a member of the Ivory Coast national football team and played professionally in France, where Valentin was born.
