= Rhein Fire =

Rhein Fire may refer to either of two American football franchises:

- Rhein Fire (NFL Europe), active in NFL Europe between 1995 and 2007
- Rhein Fire (ELF), active in the European League of Football since 2021
