= 2024 Cologne Centurions season =

American football team in Germany

2024 Cologne Centurions (ELF) season
- General manager: David Drane
- Head coach: (United States) Gregg Brandon (5 games); Jag Bal
- Home stadium: Tivoli, Aachen; Südstadion, Cologne

Results
- Record: 6-6
- Division place: 4th (Western)

Uniform

The 2024 Cologne Centurions season was the fourth season of the Cologne Centurions team in the European League of Football.

In November 2024, the Centurions hired Gregg Brandon, who has over 40 years of college experience, as new head coach. Canadian Jag Bal was signed as defensive coordinator.

Due to the UEFA Euro 2024 the stadiums in Cologne were not available for most of the season. The Centurions played the first four home games in the New Tivoli stadium in Aachen, roughly 60 kilometers west of Cologne. The first game vs neighboring Rhein Fire was a great success with 8558 spectators. The other three Aachen games saw disappointing number between 1000 and 2000 attendance. The remaining two home games took place at the Cologne Südstadion.

After week 7 head coach Brandon left the Centurions for health reasons. Jag Bal took over as head coach. Brandon had a 1-4 record. After Bal took over, the Centurions showed some surprising results, including two wins versus Frankfurt Galaxy, and Hamburg Sea Devils. The team finished with a 6-6 record ranked 4th in the six team Western conference.

== Regular season ==
=== Standings ===
Western Conference
Pos	Team	GP	W	L	CONF	PF	PA	DIFF	STK	Qualification
1	(Germany) Rhein Fire	12	11	1	9–1	476	174	+302	W9	Automatic playoffs (#3)
2	(France) Paris Musketeers	12	10	2	8–2	407	242	+165	W4	Advance to playoffs (#4)
3	(Spain) Madrid Bravos	12	8	4	6–4	411	204	+207	W1	Advance to playoffs (#6)
4	(Germany) Cologne Centurions	12	6	6	4–6	303	444	-141	W2	
5	(Germany) Frankfurt Galaxy	12	4	8	3–7	285	397	-112	L2	
6	(Germany) Hamburg Sea Devils	12	2	10	0–10	226	473	-247	L9	

Source: europeanleague.football

== Staff ==
Cologne Centurions coaches 2024
Head coach: Jag Bal; Scouting and analysis: Steffen Sikora	Offense: Offensive coordinator – Greg Studrawa; Offensive line – Greg Studrawa; Runningbacks – Steffen Sikora; Wide receiver –; Tight ends – Kai-Erik Lyck	Defense: Defensive coordinator – Jag Bal; Defensive line –; Linebacker – Oliver Tank; Defensive backs – Dave Donaldson	Special teams: Special teams coordinator – Dave Donaldson; As of 11 July 2024
