= Jim Tomsula =

American football coach (born 1968)

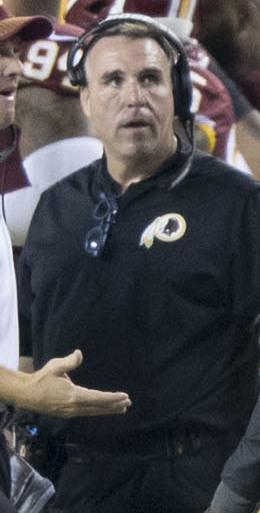
- Tomsula with the Washington Redskins in 2017

Profile
- Position: Head coach

Personal information
- Born: April 14, 1968 (age 58); Homestead, Pennsylvania, U.S.

Career information
- High school: Munhall (PA) Steel Valley
- College: Catawba

Career history
- Catawba (1989) Strength and conditioning coach; Woodland Hills HS (PA) (1990) Defensive line coach; Charleston Southern (1992–1995) Assistant coach; Catawba (1997–2005) Defensive line coach; strength and conditioning; London Monarchs (1998) Defensive line coach; Scottish Claymores (1999–2003) Defensive line coach; Berlin Thunder (2004–2005) Defensive coordinator; Rhein Fire (2006) Head coach; San Francisco 49ers (2007–2014) Defensive line coach Interim head coach (2010); San Francisco 49ers (2015) Head coach; Washington Redskins (2017–2019) Defensive line coach; Dallas Cowboys (2020) Defensive line coach; Rhein Fire (2022–2024) Head coach

Awards and highlights
- World Bowl champion (XII); 2x ELF champion (2023, 2024); ELF Coach of the Year (2023)

Head coaching record
- Regular season: NFL: 6–11–0 (.353); NFL Europe: 6–4 (.600); ELF: 30–6 (.833)
- Postseason: ELF: 5–0 (1.000)
- Career: NFL: 6–11–0 (.353); NFL Europe: 6–4 (.600); ELF: 30–6 (.833)
- Coaching profile at Pro Football Reference

James Andrew Tomsula (born April 14, 1968) is an American football coach. Serving as a defensive coach throughout his career, Tomsula has also been the head coach for the Rhein Fire of NFL Europe and the San Francisco 49ers of the National Football League (NFL). He was born and raised in the Pittsburgh suburb of Homestead. Attending Catawba College, Tomsula played defensive end from 1987 to 1990, after transferring from Middle Tennessee State University after the 1986 season. At Catawba College, he made 109 tackles in two seasons.

== Coaching career ==
=== Catawba College ===
Tomsula began his coaching career as a strength and conditioning coach at Catawba College in 1989. After serving as an assistant coach at Charleston Southern under defensive coordinator Fred Hamilton from 1992 to 1995, Tomsula returned to Catawba College, where he was a member of the coaching staff until 2005 and helped lead the Catawba Indians to four South Atlantic Conference Championships. Tomsula was inducted into the Catawba College Sports Hall of Fame 2015.

=== NFL Europe ===
Tomsula was an assistant for several years in NFL Europe. He was the defensive line coach for the London Monarchs in 1998 and for the Scottish Claymores from 1999 to 2003. In 2004, Tomsula became the defensive coordinator for the Berlin Thunder, a position he held for the 2004 and 2005 seasons. Tomsula became the head coach of the Rhein Fire for the 2006 season. That year, the Fire would finish the season with a 6–4 record but did not qualify for the playoffs.

=== San Francisco 49ers ===
==== Assistant coach ====
In 2007, the San Francisco 49ers hired Tomsula to serve as their defensive line coach and he remained in that role through the 2014 season. During the 2010 season, Tomsula was named interim head coach for the regular-season finale against the Arizona Cardinals after head coach Mike Singletary was fired. Tomsula won his head coaching debut 38–7. For the 2011 season, incoming new head coach Jim Harbaugh retained Tomsula in his previous position as defensive line coach, where Tomsula remained through all four seasons of the Harbaugh era.

==== Head coach ====
On January 14, 2015, Tomsula became the 49ers' head coach, succeeding Jim Harbaugh, who had been fired by 49ers CEO Jed York.

Tomsula employed new coaching practices, which included giving his players breaks to check social media during meetings, shorter and easier practices, and more days off. The result was one of the worst offenses in team history. Scoring only 238 points, the 49ers struggled to a 5–11 season, with quarterback Colin Kaepernick ending the season on injured reserve after being benched.

On January 3, 2016, Tomsula was fired just a few hours after the regular-season finale against the St. Louis Rams, which the 49ers won 19–16 in overtime. A few days later, York confirmed that the 49ers would pay Tomsula $14 million for his lone season as head coach.

=== Washington Redskins ===
On January 23, 2017, Tomsula was hired as defensive line coach for the Washington Redskins. In 2020, with the hiring of new head coach Ron Rivera, Tomsula was free to find a job elsewhere.

=== Dallas Cowboys ===
On January 8, 2020, Tomsula was hired as the defensive line coach for the Dallas Cowboys. He reunited with defensive coordinator Mike Nolan who was his head coach with the San Francisco 49ers. Tomsula faced heavy restrictions due to the COVID-19 pandemic in terms of physical contact with the players, their availability due to a positive test for COVID-19 or having been exposed to someone who had it, a reduced training camp schedule and the cancellation of preseason games, which made it difficult to implement the new defensive scheme. To make matters worse, most of the free agent signings for the defense were ineffective. The team would finish with a losing record (6-10), while the defensive unit allowed the most points in franchise history (473), finishing 31st in the league in run defense (158.8 YPG), 28th in scoring defense (29.6 PPG) and 20th in sacks (31). On January 8, 2021, he was fired along with defensive coordinator Nolan.

=== Rhein Fire ===
In the 2022 preseason, the management of the new Rhein Fire announced that Tomsula would be the first head coach for the upcoming season of the European League of Football. In their inaugural season, Tomsula coached the expansion Rhein Fire to a 7–5 record, the second best in the Southern Conference though the team failed to qualify for the playoffs. In 2023, Rhein finished the regular season 12–0, and Tomsula earned a nomination for Coach of the Year. Tomsula did not return as the Fire coach in 2025.

== Head coaching record ==
=== NFL Europe ===
Team	Year	Regular season					Postseason			
Team	Year	Won	Lost	Ties	Win %	Finish	Won	Lost	Win %	Result
RF	2006	6	4	0	.600	3rd place	–	–	–	–

=== NFL ===
Team	Year	Regular season					Postseason			
Team	Year	Won	Lost	Ties	Win %	Finish	Won	Lost	Win %	Result
SF*	2010	1	0	0	1.000	3rd in NFC West	–	–	–	–
SF	2015	5	11	0	.313	4th in NFC West	–	–	–	–
Total		6	11	0	.353		–	–	–	

*Interim head coach

=== ELF ===
Team	Year	Regular season					Postseason			
Team	Year	Won	Lost	Ties	Win %	Finish	Won	Lost	Win %	Result
RF	2022	7	5	0	.583	2nd in Southern Conference	–	–	–	–
RF	2023	12	0	0	1.000	1st in Eastern Conference	2	0	1.000	ELF Champion
RF	2024	11	1	0	.917	1st in Western Conference	3	0	1.000	ELF Champion
Total		30	6	0	.833		5	0	1.000	

== Personal life ==
Tomsula's grandfather, James J. Tomsula (1916–2012), was a son of immigrants from Hungary and served in the United States Navy during World War II. He is a devout Roman Catholic, but does not push his views on others, stating: "God takes care of everything...I don't give anyone religion lessons."

Tomsula has worked as a medical equipment sales representative, newspaper delivery man, firefighter, night janitor, firewood cutter, department store floor cleaner, food sales representative, and doormat salesman.
