= Leander Wiegand =

American football player (born 1999)

Profile
- Position: Guard

Personal information
- Born: August 24, 1999 (age 27); Henstedt-Ulzburg, Germany
- Listed height: 6 ft 5 in (1.96 m)
- Listed weight: 291 lb (132 kg)

Career information
- College: UCF (2021)
- NFL draft: 2025: undrafted

Career history
- Aachen Vampires (2018–2019); Cologne Centurions (2022); Rhein Fire (2023); Munich Ravens (2024); New York Jets (2025)*
- * Offseason or practice squad member only
- Stats at Pro Football Reference

Leander Wiegand (born August 24, 1999) is a German professional American football guard. He previously played in the European League of Football (ELF) for the Cologne Centurions, Rhein Fire and Munich Ravens. He joined the NFL through the league's International Player Pathway (IPP) program in 2025.

== Early life ==
Wiegand was born on August 24, 1999, in Henstedt-Ulzburg, Germany. He grew up playing soccer and handball. He later became interested in American football and joined the local Aachen Vampires in 2018, at age 19, playing for them until 2019. An offensive lineman, he was noticed at a Gridiron Imports football camp run by Björn Werner in 2019 and was invited to the Gridiron Import College Tour in 2020, though it was canceled due to the COVID-19 pandemic.

Wiegand was later trained by former NFL player Chris Mohr and was offered an athletic scholarship to play college football in the U.S. for the UCF Knights, committing to play for them in November 2020. According to Mohr, Wiegand became the first German to receive a scholarship for an NCAA Division I team "without the college ever seeing him play before. It was purely about his athletic ability". He flew to the U.S. in 2021 to play for the Knights, but after a few months, left the school and returned to Germany for personal reasons.

== Professional career ==
In 2022, Wiegand signed with the Cologne Centurions of the European League of Football (ELF). After the 2022 season, he was invited to the NFL's International Combine, telling Kicker that "they told me at the time that I had perhaps the best workout of all the players". However, despite his performance there, he was not selected for the league's International Player Pathway (IPP) program. He later performed at the Canadian Football League's pro day in 2023, but was limited after contracting a virus. He returned to the ELF for the 2023 season, joining the Rhein Fire. He was named first-team All-ELF and helped the Fire win the league championship. He then played for the Munich Ravens in 2024 and was coached by Pro Football Hall of Famer Joe Thomas. He was named second-team All-ELF for the 2024 season.

Pre-draft measurables
Height	Weight	Arm length	Hand span	40-yard dash	10-yard split	20-yard split	20-yard shuttle	Three-cone drill	Vertical jump	Broad jump	Bench press
6 ft 5 1/2 in (1.97 m)	318 lb (144 kg)	33 1/8 in (0.84 m)	10 7/8 in (0.28 m)	5.40 s	1.84 s	3.03 s	4.74 s	7.67 s	32.0 in (0.81 m)	8 ft 10 in (2.69 m)	38 reps
All values from Pro Day

In December 2024, Wiegand was selected for the NFL's International Player Pathway, training with other participants at IMG Academy in Florida. At his pro day, he recorded 38 bench press repetitions, five more than anyone who had participated at the 2025 NFL Scouting Combine. After going unselected in the 2025 NFL draft, Wiegand signed with the New York Jets as an undrafted free agent. Wiegand recorded his first NFL Snaps during Week two of the 2025 Preseason in the New York Jets game against the New York Giants. He was waived on August 26 as part of final roster cuts and re-signed to the practice squad the next day.
