= Sébastien Sejean =

French gridiron football player (born 1983)

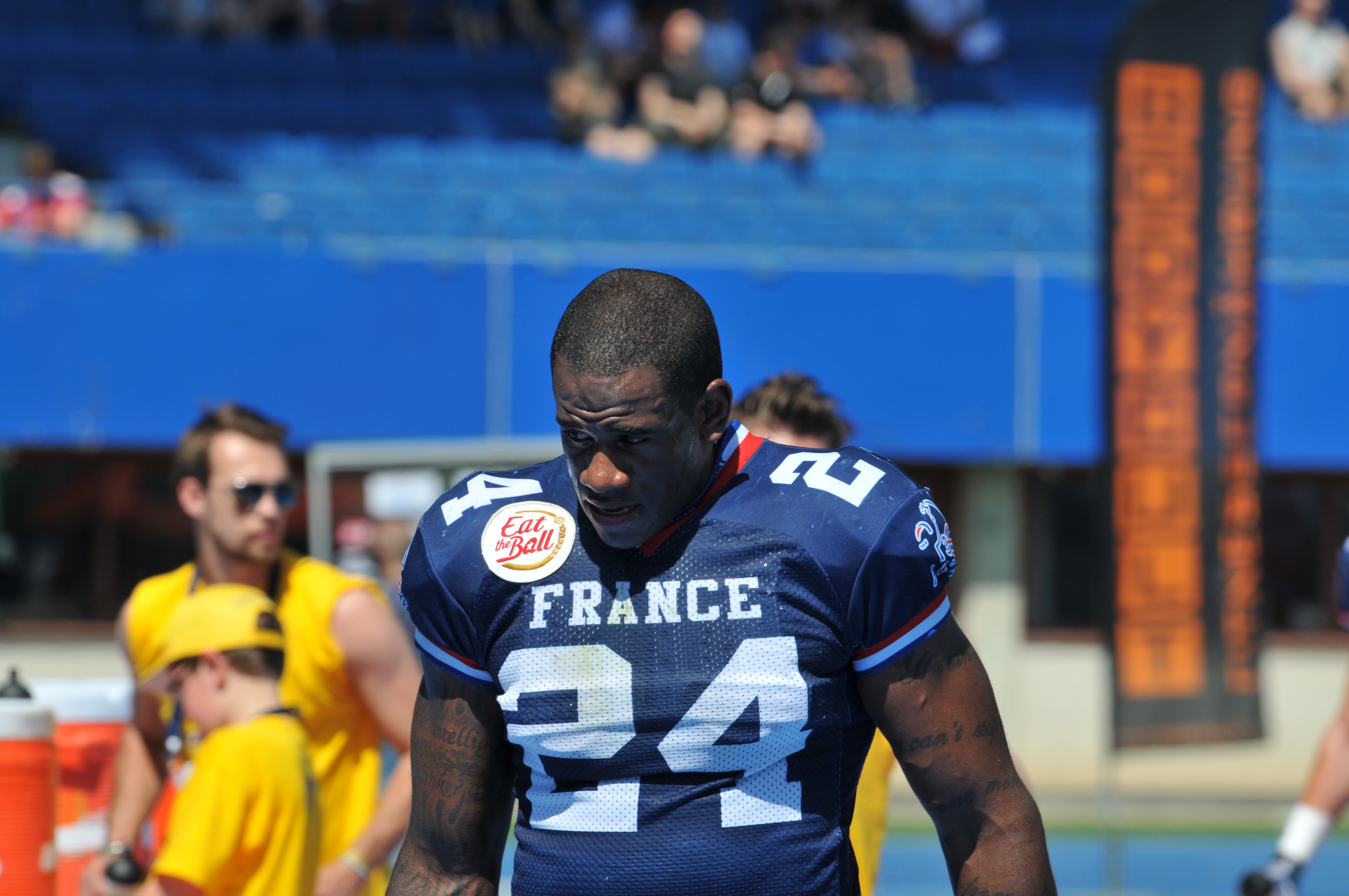

No. 32, 37, 24
- Position: Safety

Personal information
- Born: October 31, 1983 (age 43); France
- Listed height: 6 ft 2 in (1.88 m)
- Listed weight: 223 lb (101 kg)

Career information
- University: Laval
- NFL draft: 2008: undrafted

Career history
- St. Louis Rams (2008–2010)*; Spartiates d'Amiens (2011–2012)*; Dresden Monarchs (2013–2015)*; Argonautes d'Aix-en-Provence (2016–2017)*; Molosses d'Asnieres (2018)*
- * Offseason or practice squad member only

Awards and highlights
- Gold medal European Championship (2018); Gold medal World Games (2017); Bronze medal European Championship (2014); World Cup (2003, 2007, 2015); National Champions French league (2004, 2012); National Champions Canadian University (Vanier Cup 2004)

Sébastien Sejean (born October 31, 1983) is a former American football safety. He played CIS football for the Université Laval Rouge et Or.

== Career ==
Sejean discovered American football through a supervisor from his college that invited him to attend training sessions for Molossian Asnieres-sur-Seine. In 2001, he went to Amiens where he joined the team, with hopes of joining the French Federation of American football, and eventually joined the Spartans club in Amiens. In 2002, he was invited to France's junior team with which he participated in the European Junior Championships, where he earned best player honours.

In 2003, Sejean was named to the Europe team to participate in the Global Championships. During this tournament he was noticed by U.S. universities, including Louisiana Tech. That same year he participated with the senior team in France at the World Cup in Germany where France finished 4th. In 2004 he won the Diamond Helmet X with the Spartans. Thanks to his performance, he was offered to join Laval University in Quebec. In late 2004 he went to Canada to pursue his studies and football. At Laval, he joined the Red and Gold, establishing himself with winning the Laval Dunsmore Cup in 2005 and 2007 and the Vanier Cup (university championship in Canada) in 2006. In September 2007, Sejean participated in his second World Cup which took place in Japan.

Sejean was asked to play in NFL Europa, which he refused as he hoped to get a contract in the Canadian League CFL. He was then approached by the Toronto Argonauts, but at the same time he was contacted to participate in the development program organized by the NFL for foreign players. Sejean decided to try his luck in the development program, where only 16 players were offered contracts. During the tests that took place in London and Seville, he competed with 60 players, some of whom had played professionally in NFL Europa. Following the tests he was offered one of 16 contracts and signed with the St. Louis Rams, becoming the first Laval player to sign with a club in the NFL.

In 2008, Sejean participated in pre-season matches and training at the club. On August 9, Sejean came into play for the first time during the 4th quarter, managing 2 tackles. Sejean played against the Chargers in San Diego, and added 3 tackles. Finally he played the last game of the pre-season against the Chiefs in Kansas City. At the end of the pre-season he had played 3 games with 6 solo tackles.

Since the end of his contract with the Rams Sejean has looked for a new club. At the beginning of the 2011 season, he finally found a new team in Europe. Since 2011 he has been playing in the French and German leagues, with most of his time training and playing with the France National team. He won the gold medal at Wroclaw (Poland) during the international games in 2017. In 2018, he won the gold medal at Vantaa (Finland) during the European Championship.

.
