= American football at the 2017 World Games – Men's tournament =

Men's American football at the 2017 World Games
- Venue: Olympic Stadium
- Dates: 22–24 July 2017
- Competitors: 172 from 4 nations

Medalists
1st place, gold medalist(s)		France
2nd place, silver medalist(s)		Germany
3rd place, bronze medalist(s)		United States

The men's tournament in American football at the 2017 World Games in Wrocław was played between 22 and 24 July. 172 American football competitors, from 4 nations, participated in the tournament. The American football competition took place at Olympic Stadium.

== Team USA situation ==
Following the 2015 split between IFAF Paris and IFAF New York, IFAF Paris expelled USA Football in 2017. USA Football was replaced by the United States Federation of American Football in Paris, while New York retained USA Football as their active member. Since IFAF Paris was recognized by the IWGA and International Olympic Committee at the time, the United States Federation of American Football was permitted to organize the United States national American football team for the 2017 World Games.

Players, mainly professional Americans playing in Europe, were chosen for the team on May 31, 2017. Players were promised full funding from the United States Federation of American Football; however, the funding was withdrawn just days before the competition and players had to provide their own transportation to Wrocław. As a result, most of the team withdrew from the competition and were instead replaced by volunteers who were already in Europe at the time. Most of the team arrived the day before their opening match vs the Germany national American football team. The Americans lost to Germany 13–14, which was the first loss ever for a United States national American football team in international competition.

== Qualification ==
Means of qualification	Date	Qualified
Host country	23 April 2016	Poland
IFAF Americas Qualifiers	23 April 2016	United States
IFAF Asia Qualifiers	23 April 2016	Japan (withdrew)
IFAF Europe Qualifiers	23 April 2016	Germany
Reallocation		France

== Venue ==
All matches
Wrocław, Poland
Olympic Stadium
Capacity: 11,000
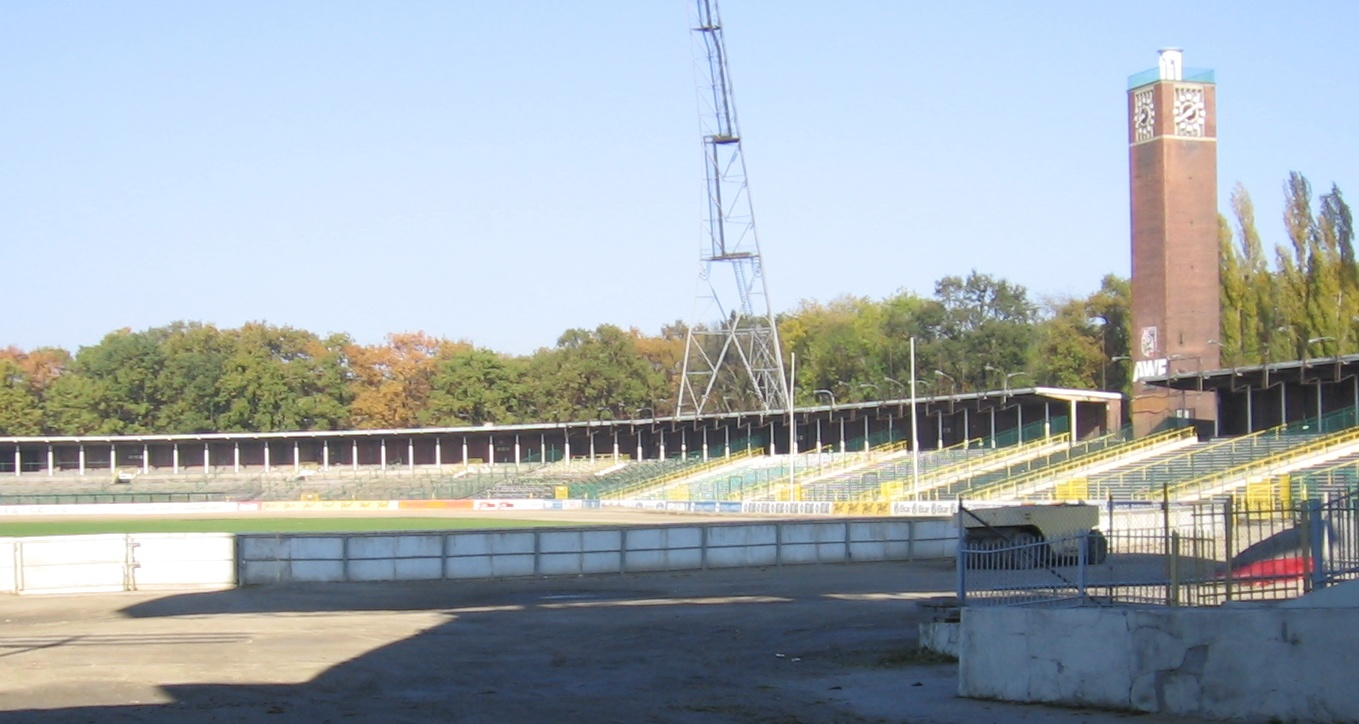

== Knockout stage ==
- All times are Central European Summer Time (UTC+02:00)

=== Bracket ===
Semifinals
22 July
United States	13
Germany	14
22 July
Poland	2
France	28

Gold medal match
24 July
Germany	6
France	14
Bronze medal match
24 July
United States	14
Poland	7

=== Semifinals ===
==== United States v Germany ====
Quarter	1	2	3	4	Total
United States	0	7	6	0	13
Germany	0	7	0	7	14

at Olympic Stadium, Wrocław

- Date: 22 July 2016
- Game time: 13:00
- Referee: Perez Canto Juan (FRA)
- Report

==== Poland v France ====
Quarter	1	2	3	4	Total
Poland	0	2	0	0	2
France	7	14	7	0	28

at Olympic Stadium, Wrocław

- Date: 22 July 2016
- Game time: 19:00
- Referee: Doboczky Zoltan (GER)
- Report

=== Bronze medal match ===
Quarter	1	2	3	4	Total
United States	0	7	0	7	14
Poland	0	0	7	0	7

at Olympic Stadium, Wrocław

- Date: 24 July 2016
- Game time: 13:00
- Referee: Doboczky Zoltan (GER)
- Report

=== Gold medal match ===
Quarter	1	2	3	4	Total
Germany	6	0	0	0	6
France	0	7	0	7	14

at Olympic Stadium, Wrocław

- Date: 24 July 2016
- Game time: 19:00
- Referee: Walentynowicz Krzysztof (POL)
- Report

== Final standing ==
Rank	Team
1st place, gold medalist(s)	France
2nd place, silver medalist(s)	Germany
3rd place, bronze medalist(s)	United States
4	Poland

2017 Men's World Games champions

France
1st title

== Medalist ==
Event	Gold	Silver	Bronze
Men's tournament	France	Germany	United States
