= 2024 Munich Ravens season =

German American football team season

2023 Munich Ravens season
- Owner: Thomas Krohne
- General manager: Sebastian Stolz
- Head coach: Kendral Ellison
- Offensive coordinator: Kyle Callahan
- Home stadium: Sportpark Unterhaching

Results
- Record: 7-3
- Conference place: 2nd (Central Conference)
- Playoffs: Lost Wild Card vs. Paris Musketeers 37–40

Uniform

The 2024 Munich Ravens season was the second season of the Munich Ravens in the fourth season of the European League of Football (ELF). The Ravens qualified for the postseason for the first time.

== Preseason ==
On 28 September 2023, the Ravens announced Kendral Ellison as new head coach, after the previous head coach John Shoop had left. Ellison previously served as Defensive coordinator for the Hamburg Sea Devils from 2021 to 2023. Kyle Callahan became offensive coordinator, after previously having the same position with the Raiders Tirol.

On 9 January 2024, the Munich Ravens introduced Joe Thomas as offensive line coach. The former NFL superstar is a member of the Pro Football Hall of Fame and supported the Ravens not only as coach, but also as marketing ambassador.

== Regular season ==
For the first time, the Munich Raves played a home game outside their home stadium in Unterhaching. The so-called "Nürnberg Game 2024" took place at the Max-Morlock-Stadion in Nürnberg with a capacity of around 44,000, roughly 160 kilometers from Unterhaching.

=== Standings ===
Central Conference
Pos	Team	GP	W	L	CONF	PF	PA	DIFF	STK	Qualification
1	(Germany) Stuttgart Surge	12	11	1	9–1	565	179	+386	W2	Automatic playoffs (#2)
2	(Germany) Munich Ravens	12	9	3	7–3	534	191	+343	W7	Advance to playoffs (#5)
3	(Austria) Raiders Tirol	12	8	4	8–2	359	227	+132	L1	
4	(Italy) Milano Seamen	12	4	8	3–7	208	402	-194	W1	
5	(Spain) Barcelona Dragons	12	2	10	2–8	117	577	-460	L8	
6	(Switzerland) Helvetic Mercenaries	12	1	11	1–9	185	438	-253	L6	

Source: europeanleague.football

== Playoffs ==
In the wild card round, the Ravens faced the Paris Musketeers in the Northern French city of Valenciennes, as 2024 Summer Paralympics were going on in Paris. The Ravens lost with a narrow 37-40.
