= 2014 European Championship of American football =

Tournament details
- Host nation: Austria
- Dates: May 30 – June 7
- No. of nations: 6

Final positions
- Champions: Germany
- Runner-up: Austria
- Third-place: France

The 2014 European Championship was the 13th European Championship of American football. The competition was held in Austria between May 30 and June 7, 2014. The top three teams qualified for the 2015 IFAF World Championship.

== Qualification ==
Since 2003, the European Championships have been held in three different stages, with the winners of the C- and B-Pool tournaments each being promoted to the next-highest level. The winner of the C-Pool tournament in 2012 was Serbia. The B-Pool tournament in 2013 took place from August 31 to September 7 in Milan, Italy. In addition to Italy and Serbia, there were also Denmark, Spain, the Czech Republic and Great Britain that battled for a spot in the A-Pool for 2014 in Austria. The winner was Denmark, which qualified for the A-pool in 2014.

== Teams ==
- Group A
  - Germany (2010 champion)
  - Sweden
  - Finland
- Group B
  - France (2010 runner-up)
  - Austria (Host)
  - Denmark (2013 B-Pool winner)

== Venues ==
Below is a list of the venues which hosted games during the 2014 EFAF European Championship. Each preliminary round group was hosted in a single arena in Sankt Pölten (Group A) and Graz (Group B). The knockout phase and finals took place at Ernst-Happel-Stadion in Vienna.

Preliminary round		Knockout stage
St. Pölten	Graz	Vienna
NV Arena; Capacity: 8,000	UPC-Arena; Capacity: 15,400	Ernst-Happel-Stadion; Capacity: 51,000

== Group stages ==
=== Group A ===
==== Standings ====
Teams	W	D	L	Pct	PF	PA	TD
Germany	2	0	0	1.000	99	47	13
Finland	1	0	1	0.500	23	60	2
Sweden	0	0	2	0.000	53	68	8

==== Schedule ====
Quarter	1	2	3	4	Total
Finland	0	0	7	0	7
Germany	7	17	16	7	47

at NV Arena, Sankt Pölten

- Date: May 30, 2014
- Game time: 19:00
- Box score

Quarter	1	2	3	4	Total
Sweden	0	6	0	7	13
Finland	6	0	10	0	16

at NV Arena, St. Pölten

- Date: June 1, 2014
- Game time: 16:00
- Box score

Quarter	1	2	3	4	Total
Germany	14	14	7	17	52
Sweden	0	12	14	14	40

at NV Arena, St. Pölten

- Date: June 3, 2014
- Game time: 19:00
- Box score

=== Group B ===
==== Standings ====
Teams	W	D	L	Pct	PF	PA	TD
Austria	2	0	0	1.000	77	16	11
France	1	0	1	0.500	74	28	10
Denmark	0	0	2	0.000	7	114	1

==== Schedule ====
Quarter	1	2	3	4	Total
Denmark	0	0	0	7	7
Austria	14	7	21	7	49

at UPC-Arena, Graz

- Date: May 31, 2014
- Game time: 19:00
- Box score

Quarter	1	2	3	4	Total
France	13	28	14	10	65
Denmark	0	0	0	0	0

at UPC-Arena, Graz

- Date: June 2, 2014
- Game time: 19:00
- Box score

Quarter	1	2	3	4	Total
Austria	14	0	14	0	28
France	0	3	0	6	9

at UPC-Arena, Graz

- Date: June 4, 2014
- Game time: 19:00
- Box Score

== Final stage ==
=== 5th place ===
Quarter	1	2	3	4	Total
Denmark	0	3	14	0	17
Sweden	6	3	0	15	24

at Football Center Ravelin, Vienna

- Date: June 6, 2014
- Game time: 19:00
- Box score

=== 3rd place ===
Quarter	1	2	3	4	Total
France	7	7	14	7	35
Finland	0	7	0	14	21

at Ernst Happel Stadium, Vienna

- Date: June 7, 2014
- Game time: 14:00
- Box score

=== 1st place ===
Quarter	1	2	3	4	OT	Total
Austria	0	9	0	8	10	27
Germany	14	0	0	3	13	30

at Ernst Happel Stadium, Vienna

- Date: June 7, 2014
- Game time: 19:00
- Box score

== See also ==
- IFAF Europe
