= Městský stadion (Ústí nad Labem) =

Stadium in Ústí nad Labem, Czech Republic

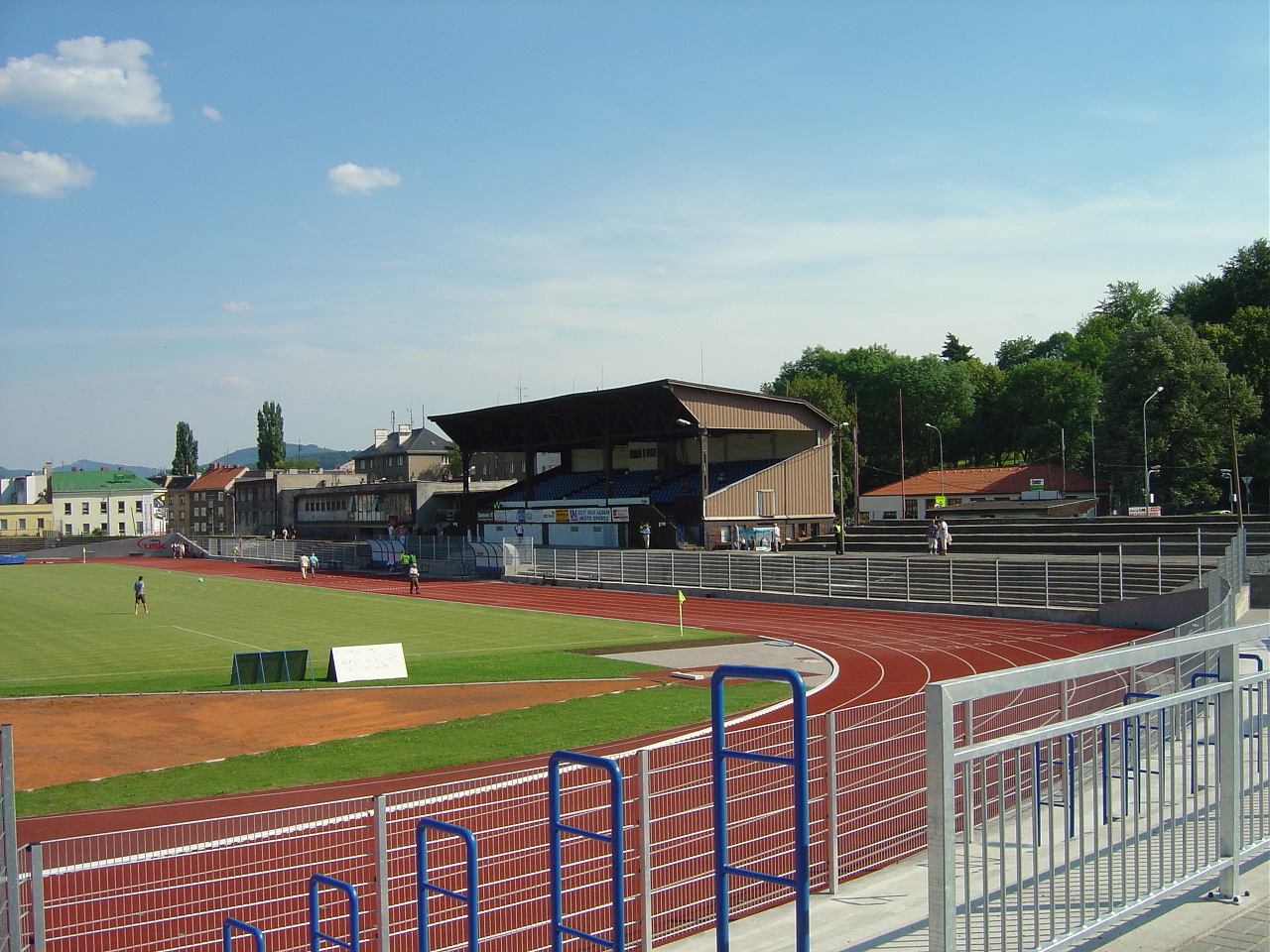
- Interactive map of Městský stadion
- Location: Ulice Masarykova 780, Ústí nad Labem, Czech Republic, 400 01
- Coordinates: 50°40′33″N 14°0′59″E
- Owner: Ústí nad Labem
- Capacity: 4,000
- Surface: Grass
- Field size: 105m x 68m

Construction
- Opened: 1945
- Renovated: 2014

Tenant
- FK Viagem Ústí nad Labem

Website
- Official website

Městský stadion is a multi-purpose stadium in Ústí nad Labem, Czech Republic. It is mainly used for football matches and is the home ground of FK Viagem Ústí nad Labem. The stadium had a capacity of 3,000 people (555 seated) before reconstruction. When Ústí were promoted to the Czech First League in 2010, it was ruled that the stadium did not meet the league criteria required by the football association. Therefore, FK Ústí nad Labem's 2010–11 Czech First League matches were played at Na Stínadlech. The ground was upgraded to be available the next season, although the club was subsequently relegated. The reconstructed stadium was reopened in 2014 with a capacity of 4,000 seats.

== International matches ==
Městský stadion has hosted one friendly match of the Czech Republic national football team

22 March 2017 International Friendly	Czech Republic	3–0	Lithuania	Ústí nad Labem, Czech Republic
18:00 (18:00 UTC+1)	Hořava 48' (pen.); Jankto 64'; Krmenčík 79'	Report		Stadium: Městský Stadion; Attendance: 3959; Referee: Alain Bieri (Switzerland)
