= New Tivoli =

Football stadium

Tivoli
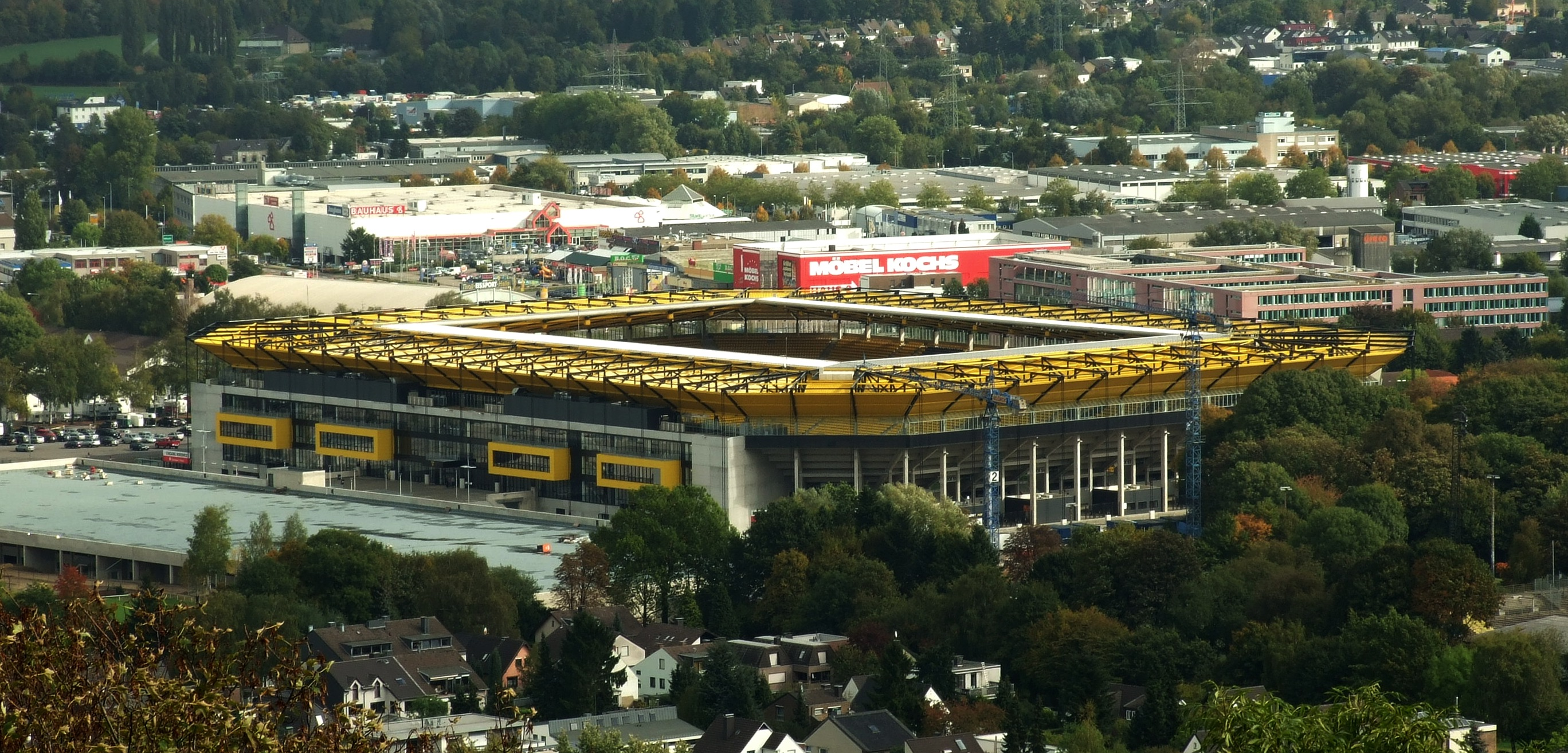
- The Tivoli in October 2009
- Interactive map of Tivoli
- Location: Krefelder Str. 205, Aachen, Germany
- Coordinates: 50°47′36″N 6°5′50″E
- Owner: Aachener Stadion Beteiligungsgesellschaft mbH (City of Aachen)
- Operator: Aachener Stadion Beteiligungsgesellschaft mbH (City of Aachen)
- Capacity: 32,960; 27,250 (for international games)
- Executive suites: 1,348
- Surface: Grass
- Field size: 105 m × 68 m (344 ft × 223 ft)

Construction
- Groundbreaking: 2007
- Opened: 12 August 2009
- Cost: € 46 million
- Architects: agn Niederberghaus & Partner GmbH, Ibbenbüren
- Structural engineer: Hellmich

Tenants
- Alemannia Aachen (2009–present); Germany national football team (selected matches)

The Tivoli, colloquially known as the new Tivoli, is a football stadium in the Sportpark Soers in Aachen, Germany, that opened on 12 August 2009 replacing the nearby old Tivoli. It hosts the home matches of Alemannia Aachen in the 3. Liga. The stadium has a capacity of 32,920 spectators – space for 11,681 standing spectators, 19,345 seated spectators and others at 1,934. The (all-)seating capacity for international games is set at 27,250.

The city first suggested the new stadium should be built outside the city, near the local airport. However, fans wanted the stadium built within the city. After much debate, plans were released in February 2007, showing that the new stadium would be built in Sportpark Soers, the sporting area the previous stadium was in.

About €4.2 million of the construction costs were financed by bonds mainly targeted at supporters of Alemannia Aachen.

The first match in the new stadium was against the Belgian team Lierse SK, but it was closed for the public. The first Bundesliga-match took place on 17 August 2009 against FC St. Pauli which Aachen lost 0–5, which was the highest home-defeat in Aachen's history.

The first international match was on 4 September 2009 when the Germany national under-21 football team played their first match of the 2011 UEFA European Under-21 Football Championship qualification against San Marino, which they won 6–0.

In June 2023, it was announced that the city of Aachen agreed to 1. FC Düren's application to use the stadium for the 2023/24 Regionalliga West season. Without the right to play their home games at the Tivoli, 1. FC Düren would not have been granted a license for the Regionalliga West and would thus inevitably have been relegated. The Düren stadium is being made suitable for Regionallia West play in the meantime.

== Capacity ==
Capacity	national	international
Standing ground	11.681	-
Seats	19.345	25.316
other	1.934	1.934
Total	32.960	27.250

== Gallery ==
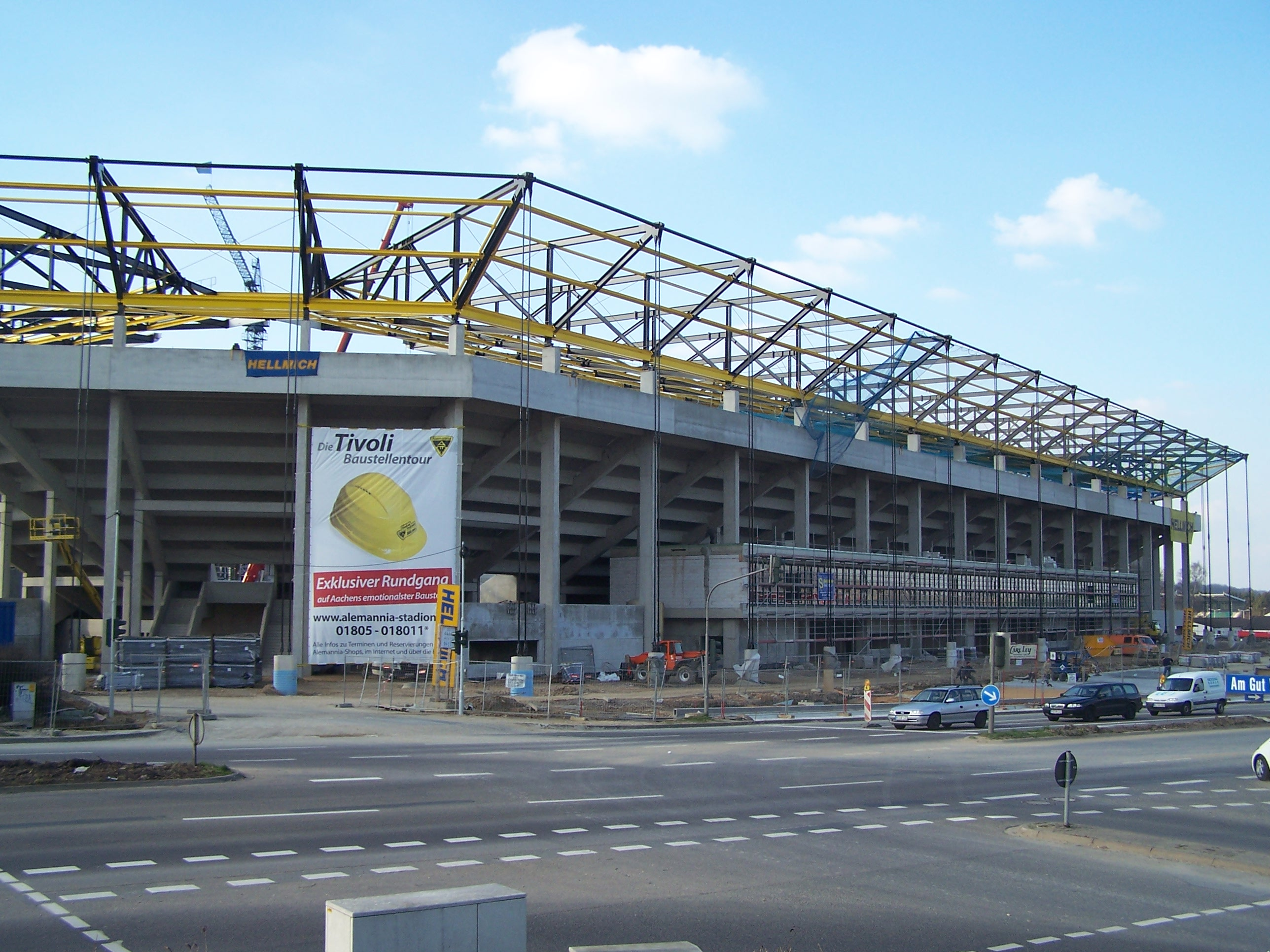
New Tivoli under construction

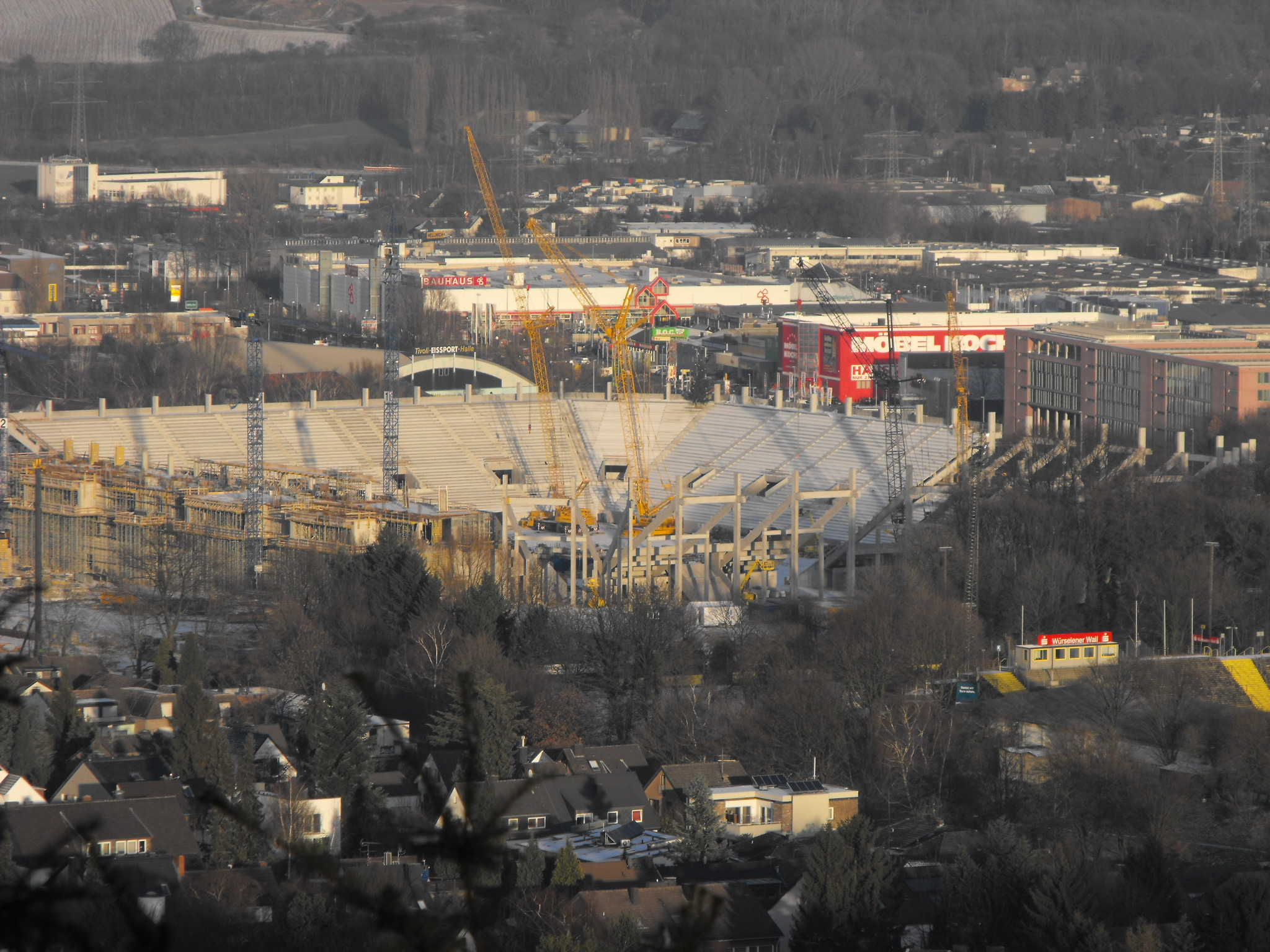
New Tivoli under construction, as viewed from Lousberg

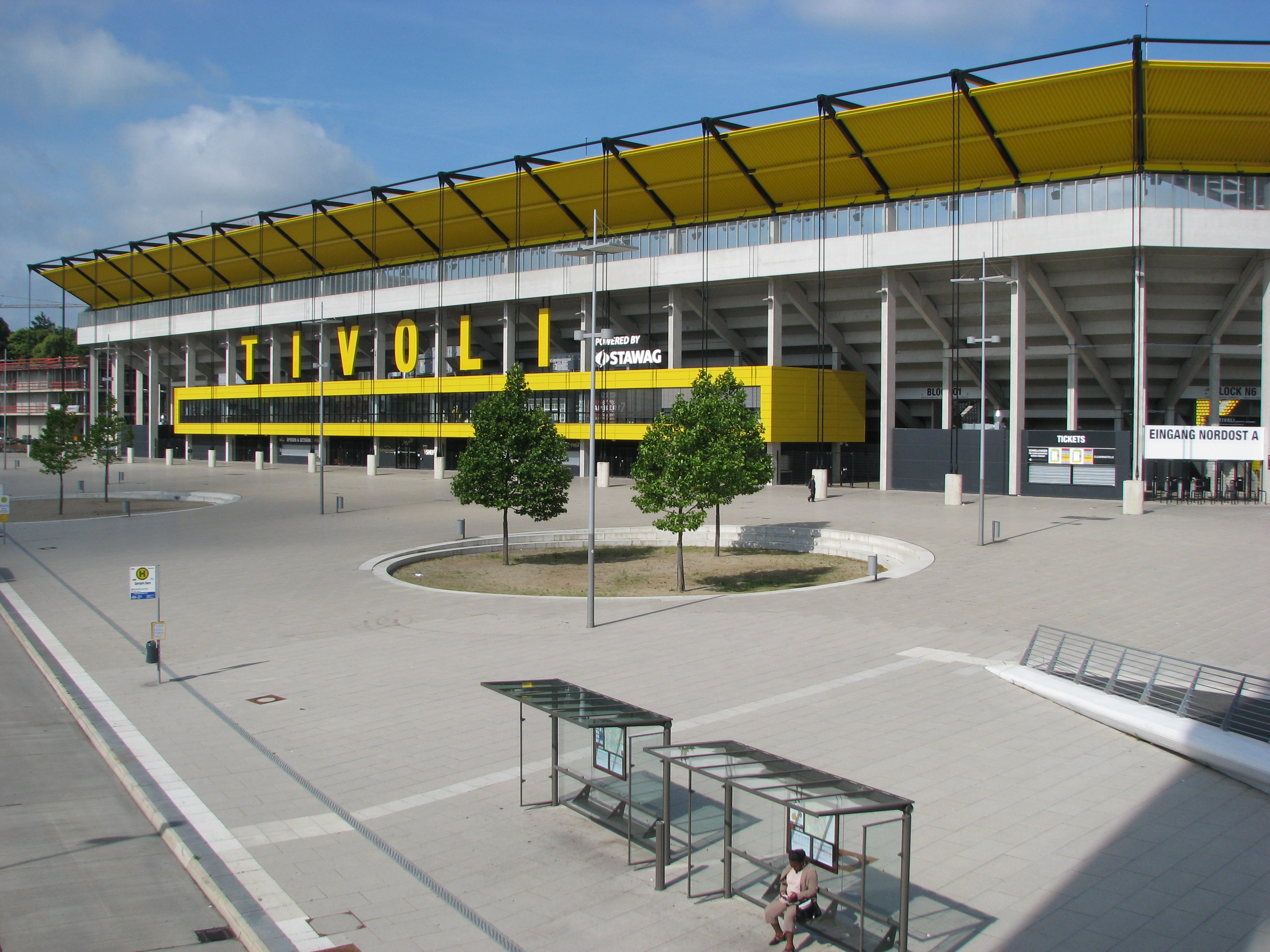
The East Stand

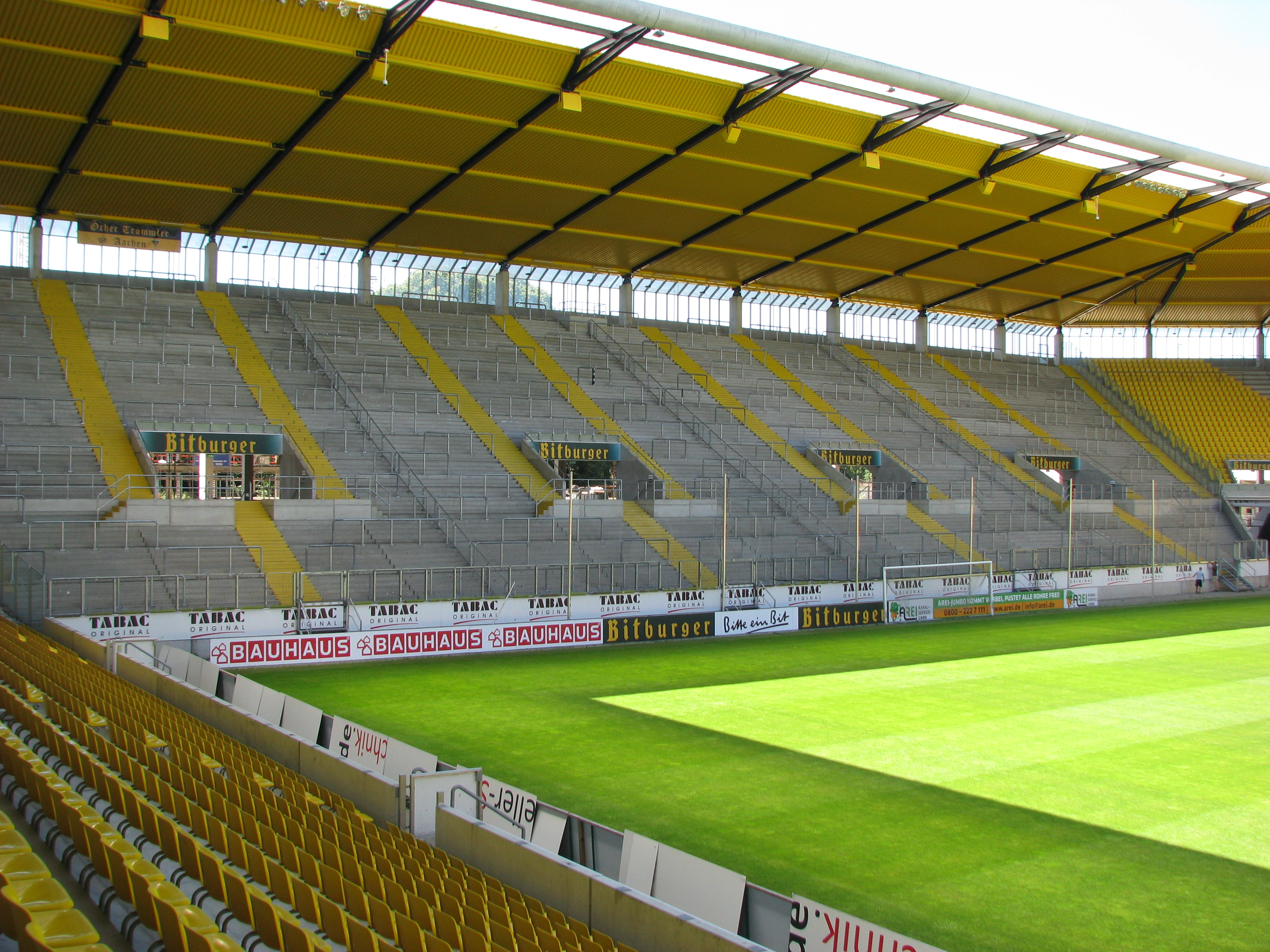
The South Stand (Renamed Werner-Fuchs-Tribüne in honour of Werner Fuchs since July 2021.)

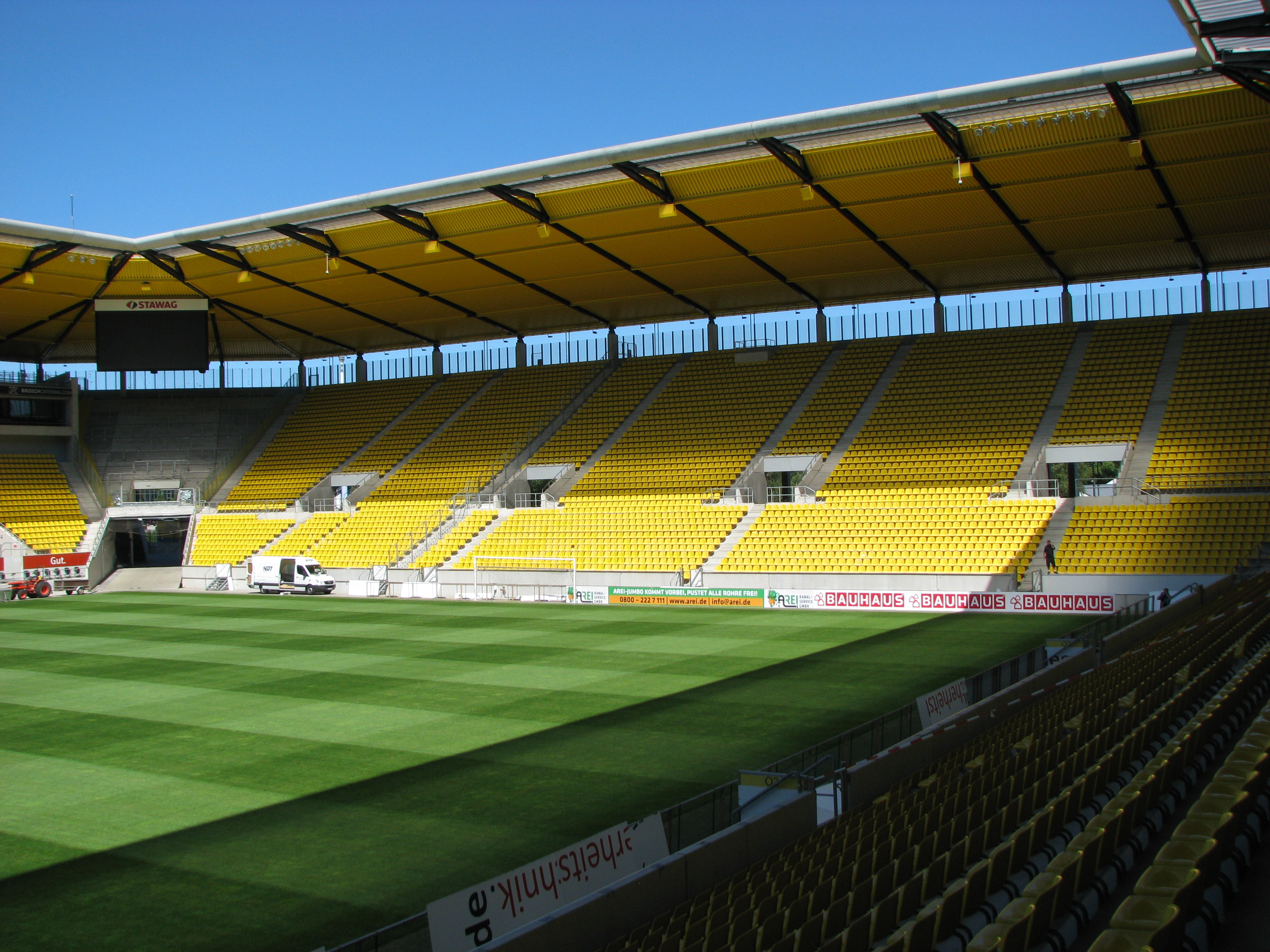
The North Stand

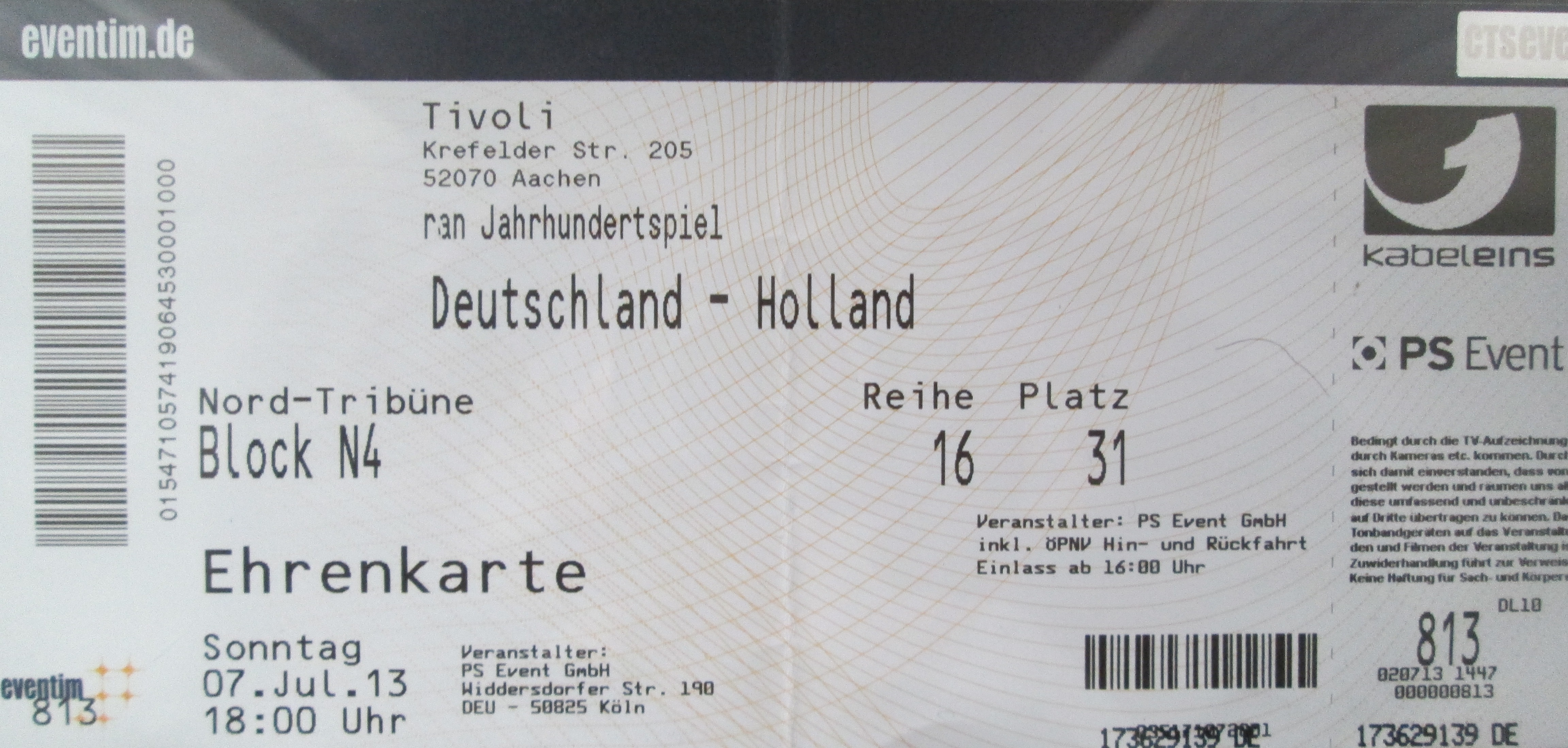
A ticket for a match between Germany and the Netherlands, played in the Tivoli

== See also ==
- List of football stadiums in Germany
- Lists of stadiums
