= MSV-Arena =

Football stadium in Duisburg, Germany

Coordinates: 51°24′33″N 6°46′43″E

Schauinsland-Reisen-Arena
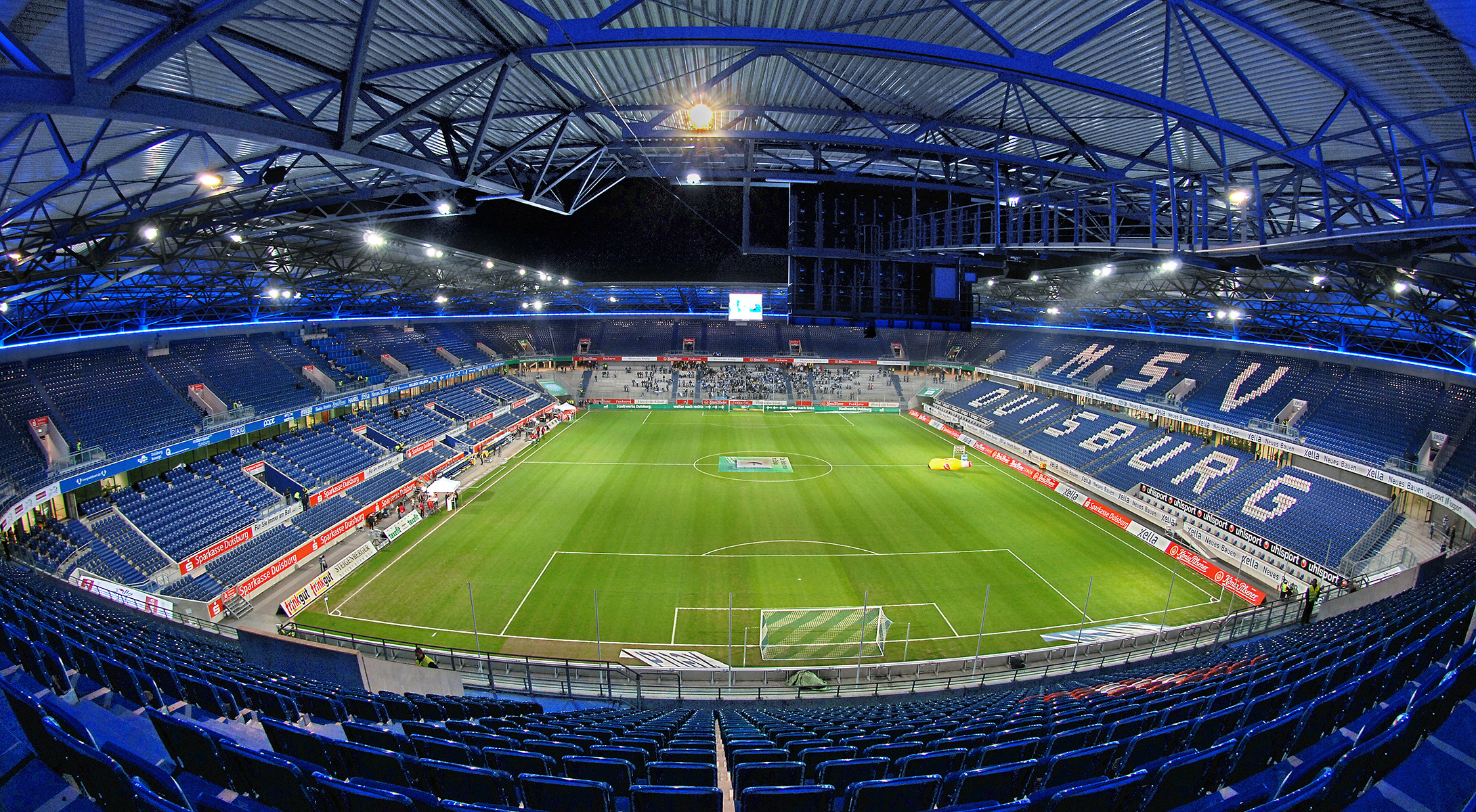
- Interactive map of Schauinsland-Reisen-Arena
- Location: Duisburg, Germany
- Owner: MSV Duisburg Stadionprojekt GmbH & Co. KG
- Operator: MSV Duisburg Stadionprojekt GmbH & Co. KG
- Capacity: 31,514
- Surface: Grass

Construction
- Groundbreaking: 17 October 2003
- Opened: 8 November 2004
- Cost: €43 million
- Architects: Michael Stehle; Patrick Gross

Tenants
- MSV Duisburg (2004–present); Rhein Fire (ELF) (2022–present); Germany national football team (selected matches)

MSV-Arena, currently known for sponsorship purposes as the Schauinsland-Reisen-Arena, is a football stadium in Duisburg, North Rhine-Westphalia, Germany, built in 2004. The stadium is the home of football club MSV Duisburg and American football club Rhein Fire. It has a capacity of 31,500. The stadium was built on the site of the old Wedaustadion. It was the venue of the 2005 World Games.

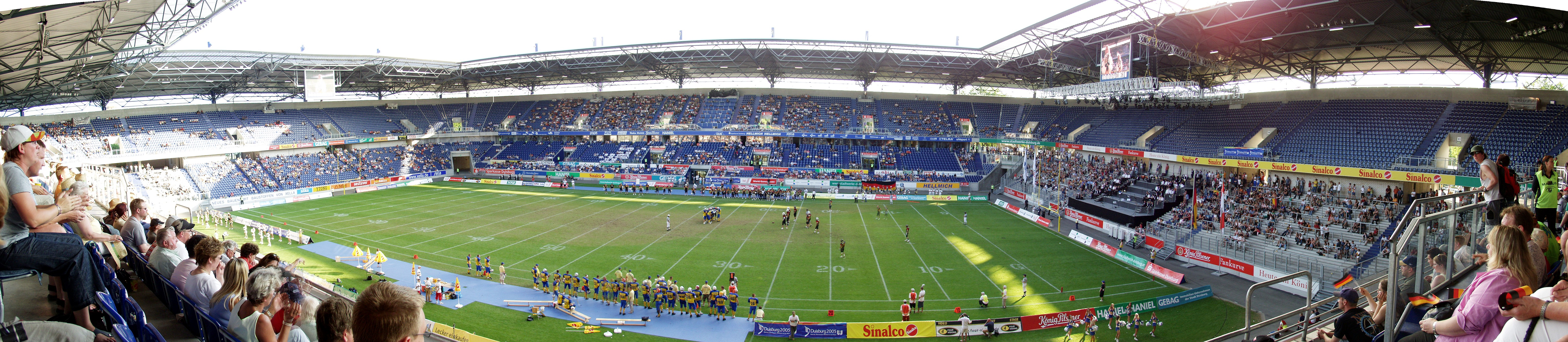
Panorama of the stadium during the final match of the American football competition of the World Games 2005

== See also ==
- List of football stadiums in Germany
- Lists of stadiums

Preceded by Wedaustadion; 1921–2003	Home of MSV Duisburg; 2004–present	Succeeded by current home
