= Rhein Fire (ELF) =

Professional American football team in Germany

- Current season
- Logo
- Uniforms

General information
- Founded: 2021
- Headquartered: Düsseldorf, Germany
- Colors: Maroon, Black, Gold, White

Personnel
- Owners: Rene Engel; Daniel Thywissen; Martin Wagner; Markus Fong; Dirk Reiner; Ottogerd Karasch; David Wallen; Andre Missing; Mirko Kürten
- General manager: Christoph Lörcks
- Head coach: Mark Ridgley

Team history
- Rhein Fire (2021–present)

Home fields
- Schauinsland-Reisen-Arena (2022–present)

League / conference affiliations
- European League of Football (2022–2025): Northern Conference (2022); Western Conference (2023–2024); North Division (2025); American Football League Europe (2026–present): North/West Conference (2026–present)

Championships
- League championships: 2; 2023, 2024
- Conference championships: 3 Western: 2023 2024; North/West: 2026

Playoff appearances (4)
- 2023, 2024, 2025, 2026

The Rhein Fire are an American football team in Düsseldorf, Germany, which plays in the American Football League Europe, and formerly competed in the European League of Football after being added as an expansion team during the 2022 ELF season.

The Rhein Fire won the ELF championship in 2023 and 2024.

== History ==
=== European League of Football (2022–2025) ===
On 25 September 2021, the Rhein Fire was announced as the third expansion and 11th overall team to play in the European League of Football beginning in the 2022 season. The team would be taking the identity of the former NFL Europe team, after the league reached an agreement before the 2021 season with the NFL for the naming rights. In the 2022 pre-season, the management announced that the former NFL Europe Rhein Fire head coach Jim Tomsula would also be the first head coach of the Rhein Fire in the European League of Football.

In the 2022 season, the Fire finished with a 7–5 record, second in the Southern Conference and one game out of a Wildcard spot. In their second season, the Rhein Fire become the first team in ELF history to finish with a perfect season, going 12–0 in the regular season and winning the ELF Championship Game over the Stuttgart Surge 53–34. Fire quarterback Jadrian Clark was named Most Valuable Player of the regular season and championship game. The Fire would win their second-straight ELF championship in 2024, beating the undefeated Vienna Vikings 51–20. Jadrian Clark won his second ELF Championship Game MVP, while Fire running back Glen Toonga was named Most Valuable Player of the 2024 season.

Following the 2024 season, both Clark and Toonga, as well as quarterback coach John Shoop would depart the Fire for the expansion Nordic Storm. Head coach Jim Tomsula announced he would not return for the 2025 season, citing personal needs. The Rhein Fire finished the 2025 season with an 8–4 record, finishing second in the North Division and qualifying for their third-straight postseason berth. The Fire would lose to the Nordic Storm in the Wildcard round, the first postseason loss in franchise history.

=== American Football League Europe (2026–present) ===
Following the 2025 season, numerous teams left the European League of Football, citing a lack of transparency by the league's leadership as well as revenue shares not being paid to teams. Teams that formed the European Football Alliance could not agree upon a league structure, with several agreeing to a new structure with the ELF. However, other teams preferred creating a new league with an external investor. This league was publicly presented as the American Football League Europe on December 2, 2025. On December 6, the AFLE announced the Rhein Fire as its first member. The Fire will play in the North/West Conference for the 2026 season.

On January 7, 2026, former Los Angeles Chargers' running backs coach Mark Ridgley was named the third head coach of the Fire.

The Rhein Fire finished the 2026 AFLE season with a 10-2 season, winning the North/West Conference championship. In the semifinal, the Panthers Wrocław eliminated the Fire scoring the go-ahead touchdown inside the two-minute warning to win the game 41-40. Several days later, the AFLE announced that they were taking over a majority ownership of the franchise to prevent immediate insolvency and ensure playability beyond 2026.

=== Season-by-season ===
| Name | Coach | Regular season | | | | | Postseason | | | | Result | Ø Attendance |
| Name | Coach | GP | Won | Lost | Win % | Finish | GP | Won | Lost | Win % | Result | Ø Attendance |
|---|---|---|---|---|---|---|---|---|---|---|---|---|
| 2022 | Jim Tomsula | 12 | 7 | 5 | .583 | 2nd (Southern) | DNQ | | | | | 8,755 |
| 2023 | Jim Tomsula | 12 | 12 | 0 | 1.000 | 1st (Western) | 3 | 3 | 0 | 1.000 | ELF Champion | 9,814 |
| 2024 | Jim Tomsula | 12 | 11 | 1 | .917 | 1st (Western) | 2 | 2 | 0 | 1.000 | ELF Champion | 10,786 |
| 2025 | Richard Kent | 12 | 8 | 4 | .667 | 2nd (North) | 1 | 0 | 1 | 0.000 | Lost Wildcard to Nordic | 10,205 |
| 2026 | Mark Ridgley | 12 | 10 | 2 | .833 | 1st (North/West) | 1 | 0 | 1 | 0.000 | Lost Semifinal to Wrocław | |
| Total | | 60 | 48 | 12 | 0.800 | - | 7 | 5 | 2 | 0.714 | - | 9,890 |

== Stadium ==
The stadium is the Schauinsland-Reisen-Arena in Duisburg with a capacity for 31,500 people. The venue is shared with MSV Duisburg of the third tier German association football league.

== Honors ==
=== Team ===
League Championship

| Season | Coach | Location | Opponent | Score | Record |
|---|---|---|---|---|---|
| 2023 | (United States) Jim Tomsula | MSV-Arena (Duisburg) | Stuttgart Surge | 53–34 | 12–0 |
| 2024 | (United States) Jim Tomsula | Ventins-Arena (Gelsenkirchen) | Vienna Vikings | 51–20 | 11–1 |

Conference/Division Championships

| Season | Coach | Division | Record |
| 2023 | (United States) Jim Tomsula | Western | 12–0 |
| 2024 | (United States) Jim Tomsula | Western | 11–1 |
| 2026 | Mark Ridgley | North/West | 10-2 |

=== Players ===
| Honor | Player Name | Season |
|---|---|---|
| ELF Most Valuable Player | (United States) Jadrian Clark | 2023 |
| ELF Most Valuable Player | (United Kingdom) Glen Toonga | 2024 |
| AFLE Defensive Player of the Year | (United States) Nazir Streater | 2026 |
| AFLE Most Improved DPOY | (Spain) Diego Paz González | 2026 |
| AFLE Offensive Lineman of the Year | (Germany) Sven Breidenbach | 2026 |

=== Coaches ===
| Honor | Coach Name | Season |
|---|---|---|
| ELF Coach of the Year | (United States) Jim Tomsula | 2023 |
| ELF Assistant Coach of the Year | (United States) Andrew Weidinger | 2023 |
| ELF Assistant Coach of the Year | (United States) Richard Kent | 2024 |
