= Jean-David Blanc =

French entrepreneur, film producer, investor (born 27 May 1968)

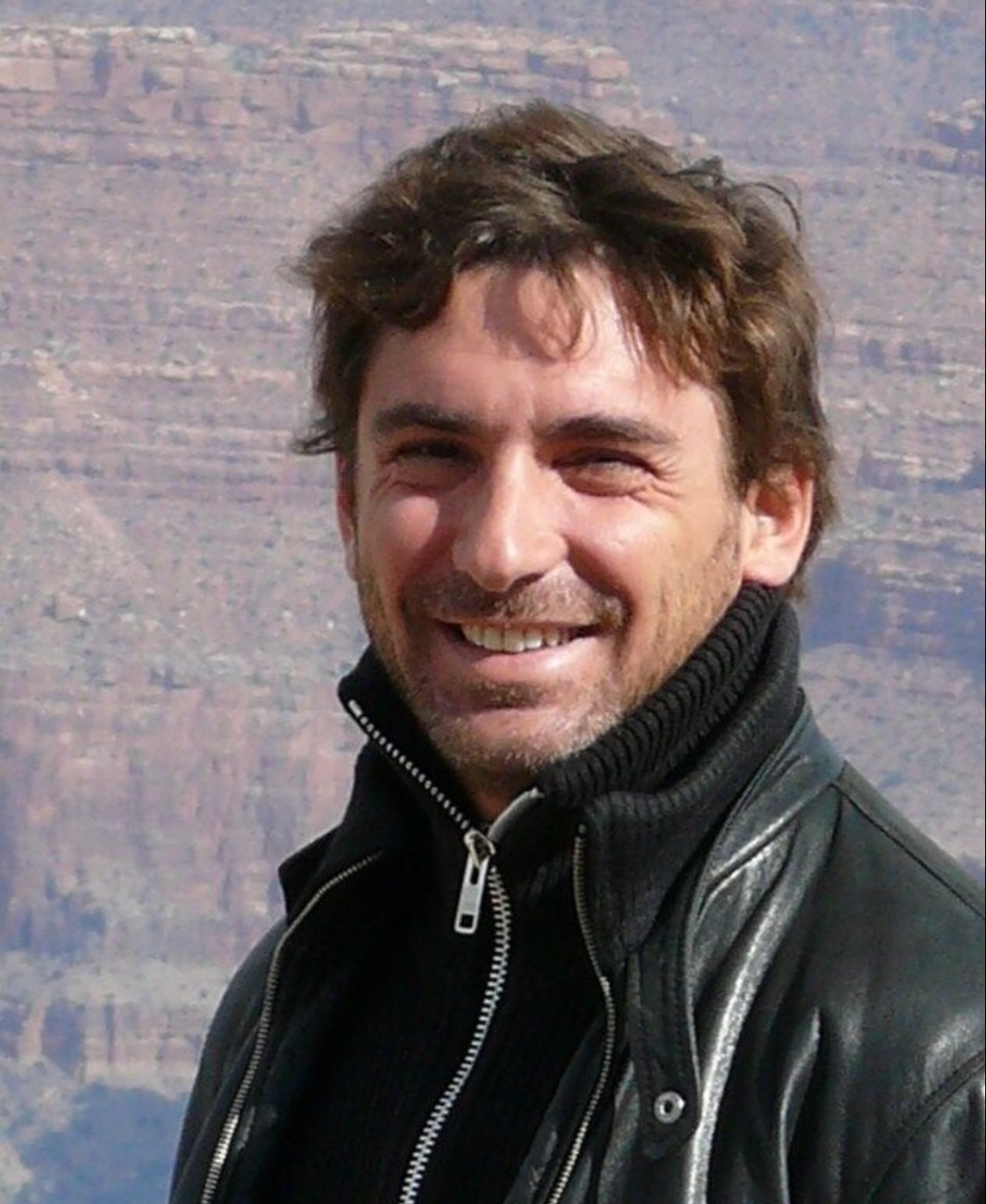
- Born: 27 May 1968 (age 58); Neuilly-sur-Seine, France
- Occupations: Entrepreneur, film producer, writer, jazz musician, investor
- Known for: AlloCiné, Molotov, Three Days in Nepal (book)
- Children: 3

Jean-David Blanc (born 27 May 1968) is a French entrepreneur, angel investor, film producer, writer and jazz musician, founder of AlloCiné and Molotov. He is France's thirteenth favorite entrepreneur according to the 2022 ranking drawn up by Forbes France.

Born into a family of musicians (his father was the violinist Serge Blanc), he took an early interest in computing, a nascent field in France at the time. As a teenager, he created video games for the Apple II and sold programming services. At 15, he co-founded the bulletin board system Futura, before launching his first company, Crystal Technologies. By the time he passed his baccalauréat, he was already running a company with around fifteen employees.

His career really took off with the creation of AlloCiné at the age of 22, an innovative cinema information service by telephone later launched on the Internet, which became a notable success and still is today. After selling AlloCiné, he launched Molotov in 2016, a streaming distribution service for television channels, which also became a rapid success before being acquired by fuboTV in 2021. Jean-David Blanc became an influential angel investor, investing in a number of startups, including Meetic, Stripe and Square. He is also involved in artistic and literary activities. In 2012, following a paramotor accident, he wrote his first book, Three Days in Nepal, published by HarperCollins.

== Biography ==
=== Childhood and early career ===
Jean-David Blanc was born on 27 May 1968 in Neuilly-sur-Seine near Paris (France), in a family of musicians. His father is the violinist prodigy Serge Blanc who entered the Conservatoire de Paris at the age of 10, and his mother a music teacher. His younger brother, Emmanuel Blanc, is a violist within the French National Orchestra (Orchestre National de France). He took an early interest in computer science, a nascent field in France at the time.

=== Business career ===
At the age of 15, Jean-David Blanc and Jean-Marc Royer created the bulletin board system Futura, an imaginary city with discussion forums and virtual meeting places like a town hall, a post office or a police station. He created his first IT services company, Crystal Technologies, and launched the first electronic information service for Minitel, "Marlboro Racing Service", the following year. At 17, he set up Concerto Télématique, a company providing interactive Minitel and telephone services to major brands such as Marlboro, Nissan and Coca-Cola.

==== Creation of AlloCiné ====
At the age of 22, Jean-David Blanc came up with the idea of AlloCiné, a fully automated cinema information service by telephone, providing free schedules of all Paris cinemas. At that time, the cinema showtimes could only be read on the spot or in cultural guides such as L'Officiel des spectacles or Pariscope. Jean-David Blanc and his co-founder, Patrick Holzman, obtained an easily remembered non-surcharged number, 40 30 20 10, which will make the service a success.

In 1995, AlloCiné launched advance ticket booking which didn't exist in France at the time, then multiplied the distribution channels: interactive kiosks, Minitel, PalmPilot, then Internet in 1997. After running AlloCiné for ten years as CEO, he sold the company in 2001 to Vivendi-Universal. The ambition of the company headed by Jean-Marie Messier was then to develop a worldwide service and make AlloCiné its cornerstone, but Jean-David Blanc finally decided to leave the group shortly after.

==== Creation of Molotov ====
In July 2016 he launched, notably with Pierre Lescure, founder of Canal+, a new online TV channels distribution service called Molotov. The aim was then to offer access to live channels and catchup programming without any hardware other than Internet access, for which he raised €35 million. The company makes money by offering programme recording options and pay-TV channels packages.

At its launch, the service was considered by the industry as the future of television, innovating with its interface and ease of navigation through television programmes. Molotov reached one million users in eight months. The company was acquired in November 2021 for €164.3 million by fuboTV, an American subscription-based video on demand service, which aimed to make it its European hub. Jean-David Blanc stayed on as president of Molotov and became its chief strategy officer. Molotov then claimed more than thirteen million users, including 250,000 paying users.

==== Angel investor ====
He is one of the first investors in Meetic, the French pioneer of dating websites founded by Marc Simoncini and dozens of start-ups such as the Stripe payment service, Square launched by Jack Dorsey the founder of Twitter, Coursera, Wemoms (later acquired by Voodoo) or the Stuart delivery service (acquired by La Poste).

In 2022 and 2023, he is ranked in the top 20 of France's favorite entrepreneurs established by the magazine Forbes.

=== Artistic activities and private life ===
Jean-David Blanc has been a musician from an early age. He worked with his father the violinist Serge Blanc and studied harmony with the pedagogue Robert Kaddouch, as well as piano jazz at the American School of Modern Music in Paris. In cinema, he has worked with actors and directors on various movies. In particular, he collaborated with Bruno Monsaingeon on the filming of the recital of the Tchaikovsky's Trio by Yehudi Menuhin in Moscow. He took a part in the movie Chance or Coincidence by Claude Lelouch in 1998. In 2005, he produced the movie Cavalcade, starring Marion Cotillard and Bérénice Bejo, adapted from the autobiographical book by Bruno de Stabenrath.

In 2012, he wrote his first book, Three Days in Nepal, published in France by the Éditions Robert Laffont and in the United States and Canada by HarperCollins. The book tells his experience in 2011 when he found himself trapped in the mountains of Nepal following a paramotor accident. Unable to call for help, he spent three days descending the Himalayas alone to reach the valley and return to civilisation.

Jean-David Blanc has been in a relationship with the French director and producer Sarah Lelouch, with whom he has a daughter, Rebecca Blanc-Lelouch, born in 1998, then with Australian actress Melissa George with whom he has two children, Raphaël, born in 2014 and Solal, born in 2015. The relationship ended in 2016 when Melissa George accused him of domestic violence. Jean-David Blanc, who has always denied these accusations, was found innocent and discharged on 5 February 2021. Melissa George, meanwhile, was convicted for using false certificate in court, domestic violence, defamation., and on November 10, 2021 and June 27, 2024 to a 6-month suspended prison sentence for attempted child abduction.
