= Molotov TV =

French streaming television service

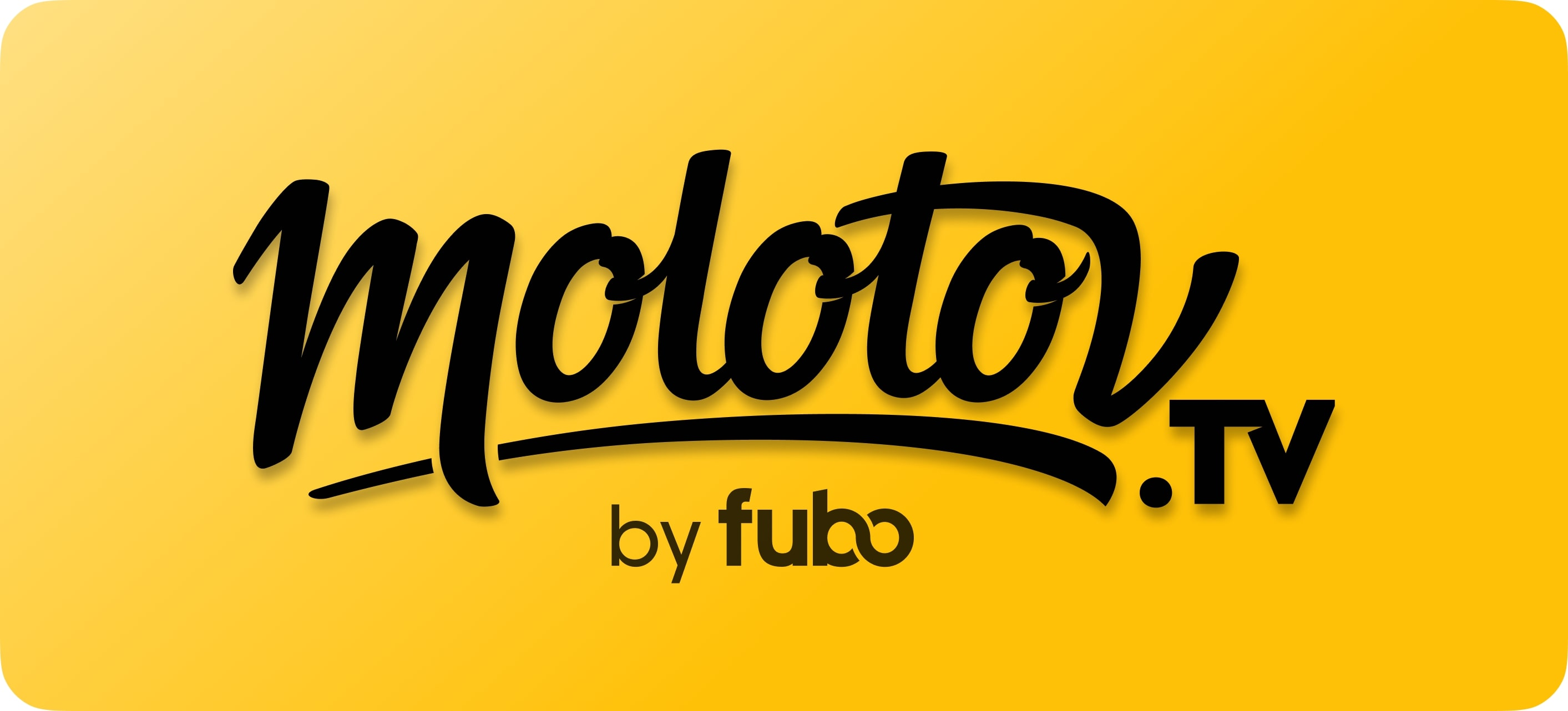
- Industry: streaming television
- Founded: July 11, 2016
- Founder: Jean-David Blanc; Pierre Lescure
- Headquarters: Paris, France
- Key people: Jean-David Blanc (President & CEO); Grégory Samak (general manager)
- Parent: FuboTV
- Website: molotov.tv

Molotov TV, stylised as Molotov.TV or simply Molotov, is a French streaming television distribution service launched on 11 July 2016. Founded by Jean-David Blanc (founder of AlloCiné) and Pierre Lescure (former chairman of Canal+), the service offers access to TV channels and catchup programming without any hardware other than an Internet access. It's today one of France's main TV distribution services, now owned by American streaming company FuboTV.

== Offer ==
Molotov TV allows viewers to watch several forms of programming within a single interface: live television, catch-up and, in the pay version, recording of favourite programmes in Molotov's cloud for later viewing in streaming and the possibility of downloading for offline viewing.

Molotov makes it possible to watch television over the Internet, using the over-the-top media service principle by being accessible free of charge with a French IP address in its basic package and from the twenty-seven countries of the European Union, Iceland, Norway and Liechtenstein. By subscribing from France to the Molotov Extra option, the service is available on all screens, from mobile to smart TV, including iOS and Android devices. Among other features, Molotov also allows users to go back to the beginning or any point in time of a programme broadcast live, record it in the cloud or follow a personality to be alerted when programmes linked to him or her are broadcast.

The service also offers no-obligation, pay-as-you-go options: access to up to 164 channels in total, 150 hours of recording in the cloud that can be viewed in streaming, downloading of these programs for offline viewing, simultaneous broadcasting to four screens Full HD and 4K, and access from all European Union countries, Iceland, Norway and Liechtenstein for French residents who subscribe to the Molotov Plus option. With the Filmo option, more than 1,000 cinema titles are available on VOD.

The possibility of accessing TV channel programmes on any terminal connected to the Internet could augur a challenge to the triple play model based essentially in France on the Internet box of telephone companies.

== History ==
On 11 July 2016, Molotov was officially launched at WWDC by Apple in Cupertino. The service was then immediately seen by the industry as the future of television, innovating with its interface and ease of navigation through television programmes. On 7 December 2016, the Ciné+ option was added to the Molotov offer, giving access to six premium cinema channels. Also in December 2016, Molotov announced that it had completed a second fundraising round of 22 million euros, after an initial fundraising of 10 million euros in 2014. Molotov reaches one million users in eight months. On 4 July 2017, the OCS television channels bouquet joins Molotov.

On 14 September 14, 2017, Médiamétrie announced that Molotov's audiences would be counted on all screens (TV, computer, cell phone and tablet) measurement and integrated into Médiamétrie's daily measurements from 2 October 2017. In October, Molotov enabled its users with a paid option to enjoy the service in HD 1080p and Ultra HD, with free users still benefiting from 720p HD. As of November 2018, the company claims 6.6 million users and up to 900 new paying subscribers every day, compared with around 20 in 2017. The 7 million user mark is reached at the end of December 2018.

On 30 January 2019, the Altice group announced that it had entered into exclusive negotiations to become a majority shareholder in Molotov, with the two groups shared objective of accelerating the app's development in France and internationally, and offering Altice Group customers (via SFR and RMC Sport), the best digital experience and OTT on the market for customers. However, Jean-David Blanc made it clear that Molotov was not for sale. Almost a year later, in January 2020, negotiations with Altice having came to nothing due to the dissatisfaction of some shareholders, Xavier Niel bailed out the company to the tune of 30 million euros and Molotov said it has passed the 10 million user mark.

On January 19, 2020, Molotov joined the French Tech 120 index. In April, the last two major DTT channels still unavailable on Molotov, (NRJ 12 and Chérie 25, joined the free basic offer following the resolution of a long-running disagreement with the NRJ Group. With the first confinement caused by the COVID-19 pandemic and the closure of schools, Molotov adapted its offer to the needs of students and in April 2020 offered the "Molotov for school" section, accessible from kindergarten through to the final year of high school, bringing together all TV content organized by class and by theme. These courses, designed by teachers, were produced by Toulouse-based start-up SchoolMouv.

In June, Molotov announced the launch of Molotov Solutions, over-the-top media services for professionals. It launched Mango (now Molotov Channels) in November, the first advertising video on demand (AVOD) service featuring movies, documentaries and programs for children accessible from any free account. After launching its offer in Ivory Coast at the end of December, Molotov announced in a press release its intention to expand in French-speaking Africa, with a short-term plan for six other countries on the continent: Senegal in January, Cameroon in February, Burkina Faso in March, Tunisia in April, followed by Guinea and Democratic Republic of the Congo.

On 10 November 2021, Molotov was bought out for 164.3 million euros by its American counterpart FuboTV: "This marks the start of a new era for Molotov, which is going to roll out with much greater resources, on two continents, with a real desire to form a global group," said Jean-David Blanc, its CEO.

On May 16, 2022, Molotov announced the launch of seven thematic free ad-supported streaming television channels from its AVOD Mango offer, its free video-on-demand service financed by advertising: Mango, Mango Séries, Mango Cinéma, Mango Kids, Mango Docs, Mango Histoires and Mango Novelas.
