= Melissa George =

Australian and American actress (born 1976)

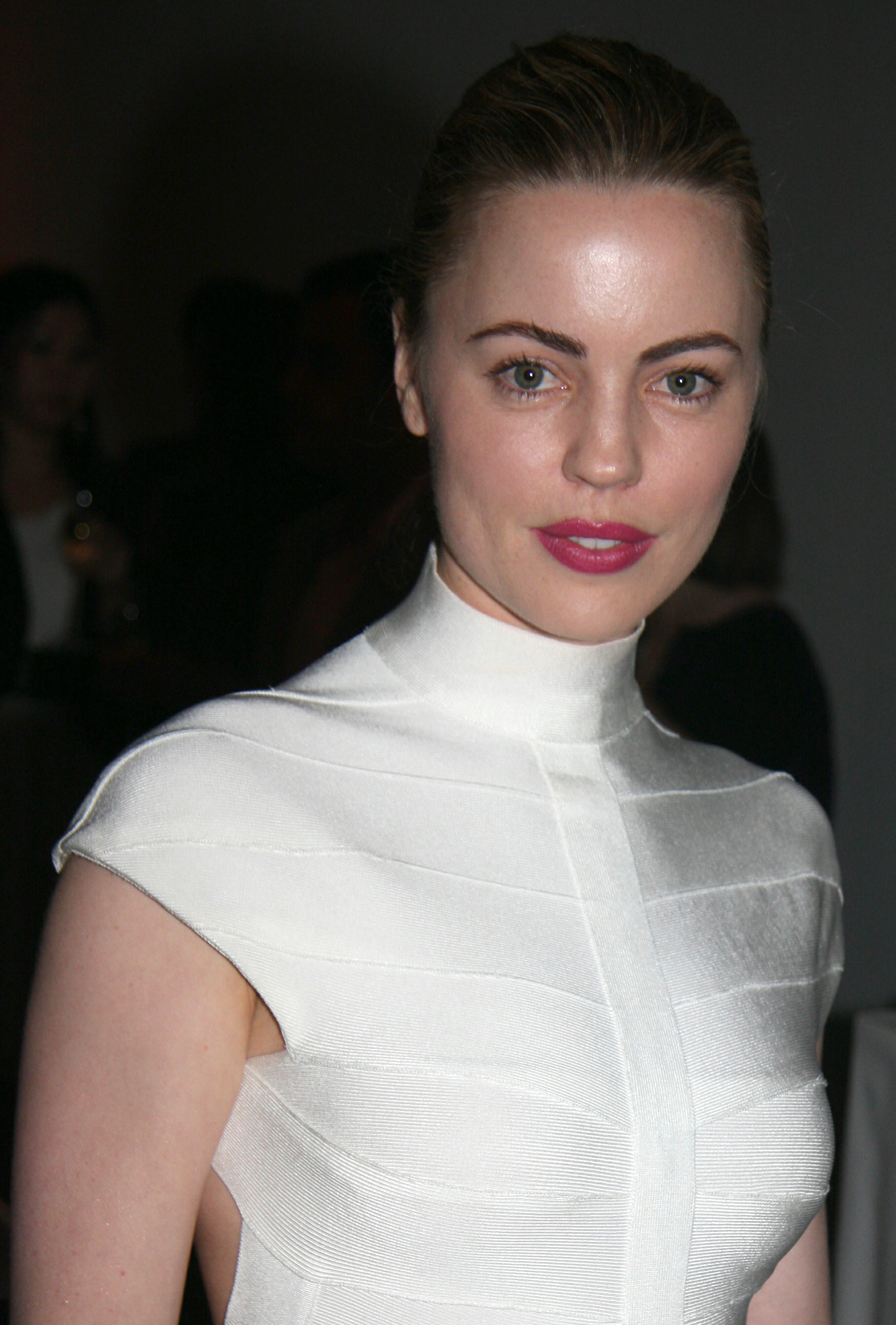
- George in 2009
- Born: Melissa Suzanne George; 6 August 1976 (age 50); Perth, Australia
- Citizenship: Australia; United States (from 2008)
- Occupation: Actress
- Years active: 1992–present
- Spouse: Claudio Dabed (m. 2000; div. 2011)
- Partner: Jean-David Blanc (2011–2016)
- Children: 4

Melissa Suzanne George (born 6 August 1976) is an Australian-American actress. She began her career playing Angel Parrish on the Australian soap opera Home and Away between 1993 and 1996. After moving to the United States, George made her feature film debut with a supporting role in the 1998 tech noir Dark City. She made the transition to leading roles when she starred in the 2005 remake of The Amityville Horror, gaining further recognition with the thriller Derailed (2005), and the genre films 30 Days of Night (2007) and Triangle (2009).

Outside film, George played the recurring role of Lauren Reed on ABC's Alias (2003–2004). She was Golden Globe nominated for playing Laura Hill on the first season of HBO's In Treatment (2008), and won the Logie Award for Most Outstanding Actress for her portrayal of Rosie in the Australian miniseries The Slap (2011); she reprised the role in the 2015 American adaptation. She starred as Margot Fox on the Apple TV+ drama series The Mosquito Coast from 2021 to 2023.

== Early life ==
George was born in Perth, Australia, the second of four children born to Pamela, a nurse, and Glenn George, a construction worker. Her paternal grandmother was a Scottish immigrant. William Ward, her maternal grandfather, worked as a prison warden at Rottnest Island, offshore from Perth. She is a cousin of the opera singer Taryn Fiebig.

George attended Warwick Senior High School and developed an interest in dancing and began studying jazz, tap, ballet, and modern dance at the age of seven. Her enthusiasm for dance eventually evolved into a passion for artistic roller skating. She was a national roller-skating champion and was named Western Australia's Teenage Model of the Year when she was 16.

== Career ==
=== 1992–1998: Early work ===
George began modelling in her early teens, and in 1992 was named Western Australia's Teenage Model of the Year. At the age of 16, George and a friend, Cara Mitchinson, both acted in a mock episode of the popular Australian soap Home and Away with a video camera, playing Bobby and Sophie Simpson; respectively. When the offer of a role on the serial came, George's parents convinced her to relocate from her native Perth to Sydney and she began lodging with families. George met with casting director Liz Mullinar and was subsequently cast in the role of Angel Parrish. She made her first on-screen appearance on 30 March 1993, arriving as a teenage runaway. While playing the role, George made property investments and wrote advice columns for two English teen magazines.

Her role earned her five consecutive Logie Award nominations, of which she won two. The character became popular among viewers when she was paired up with Shane Parrish, and to this day they remain one of the soap's most loved couples. George departed Home and Away on 30 August 1996. She then made a health and fitness video, Mind, Body and Soul (1996), created a sleepwear line called "An Angel at My Bedside", and had a recurring role on the short-lived 1997 Fox Broadcasting Company television fantasy drama series Roar, which was filmed in Queensland, opposite Heath Ledger. Her fearlessness in performing the show's stunts endeared her to the show's creator, Shaun Cassidy, who subsequently cast her as the female lead in the pilot Hollyweird. A show about "the adventures of an intrepid pair of friends from Ohio who take their love for the macabre and use it to solve crimes plaguing Los Angeles", she was to star alongside Bodhi Elfman and Fab Filippo. The pilot was ordered to series, however, the Fox Network's tinkering and delays frustrated Cassidy, who pulled out of the project, saying that Fox had forced him to spend "much of the last year trying to fix something I never viewed as broken in the first place." Ultimately, production never went ahead on the show. George then appeared on the cover and in a nude pictorial for the March 1997 issue of Australian Playboy.

In late 1997, George decided to relocate from Australia to the United States, hoping to establish a career in Hollywood. Within a year after relocating, George made her film debut in the critically acclaimed neo-noir science fiction film Dark City (1998).

=== 1999–2008: Film breakthrough ===
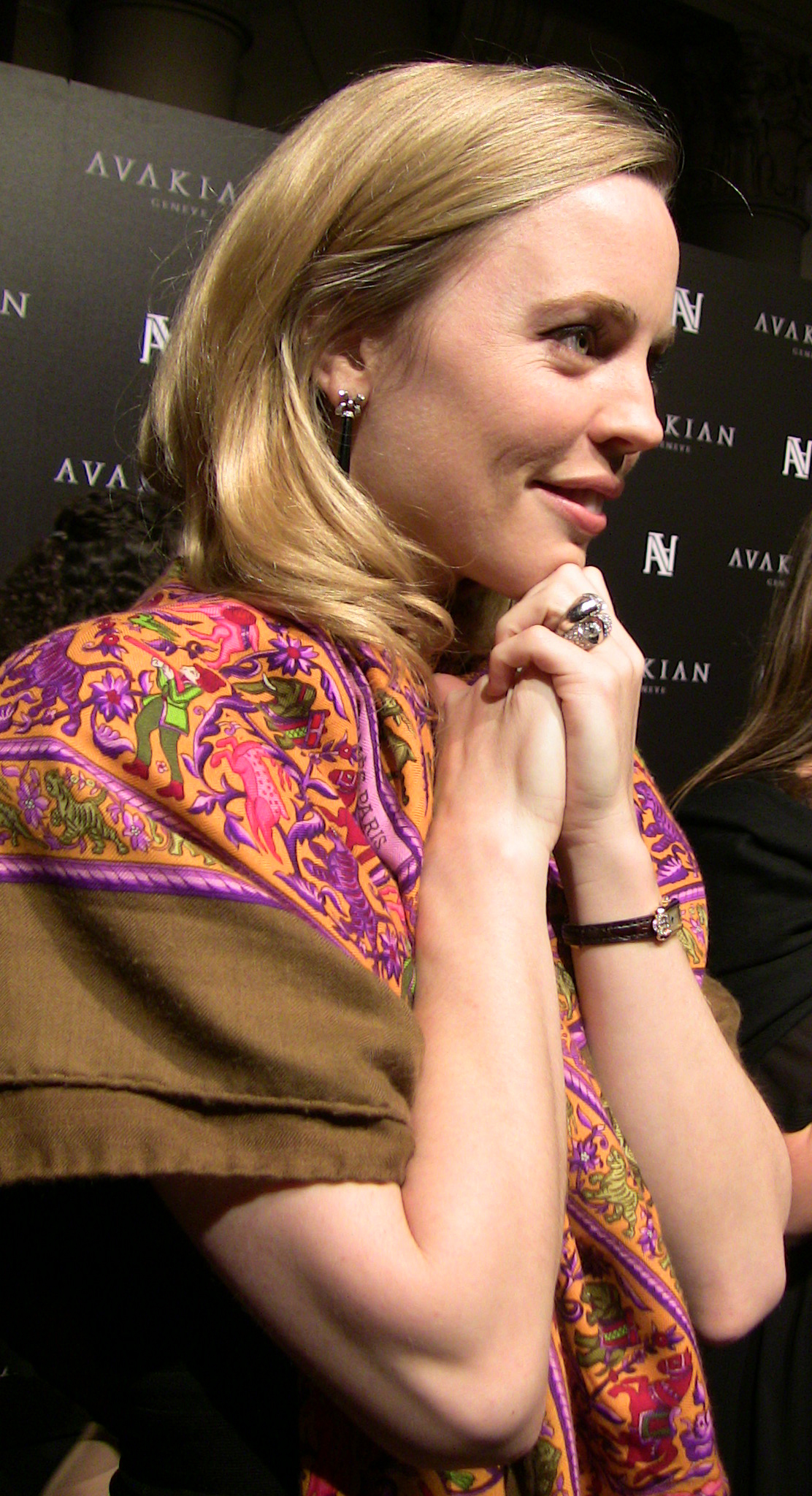
George in December 2008

After a supporting role in Steven Soderbergh's 1999 neo-noir crime film The Limey, she was cast in a supporting role, Cleo Miller, in the 2001 black comedy Sugar & Spice and had a minor role in David Lynch's critically acclaimed Mulholland Drive, which opened at the 2001 Cannes Film Festival. She starred in several unaired TV pilots, including the lead role in Lost in Oz, an original sequel to The Wizard of Oz, inspired by the Oz books of L. Frank Baum. After the pilot was filmed, a significant amount of time passed before the decision was made to film a second episode. However, by then George's contract had lapsed and she didn't want to move back to Australia to shoot it, as she had just moved to America. Ultimately, a second episode was never shot and the show was never picked up.

She starred in the short-lived ABC drama-comedy Thieves, co-starring John Stamos. She starred in the sixth season-premiere of the WB series Charmed, had a minor role opposite Renée Zellweger and Ewan McGregor in the 2003 romantic comedy Down with Love, and was originally cast as Susan Freeman in the American series Coupling based on the British series of the same name. After "an audition from hell", George was cast and filmed the pilot, but the network (NBC) then fired the writers and replaced George and her fellow castmembers Breckin Meyer and Emily Rutherfurd with Rena Sofer, Colin Ferguson, and Sonya Walger; respectively. The series lasted only four episodes and show creator Steven Moffat blamed NBC's meddling as the reason for the show's failure, saying that they "fucked it up because they intervened endlessly." George later commented that she "dodged a bullet" by being replaced before the show aired.

In 2003, she had a role in two episodes of Friends, where she played Molly, the early babysitter for Ross and Rachel's baby, Emma. Also in 2003, she landed the role of Lauren Reed on the ABC television series Alias. She had auditioned to play lead character Sydney Bristow, but lost out to Jennifer Garner. When that happened, ABC cast her on Thieves instead. It was originally planned that George would guest-star for several episodes but she was quickly upgraded to regular. To explain her character's accent (George is Australian), the writers wrote that she was born in the United States but grew up in London. George left the show at the end of the third season, saying that "I got offered a couple of films so I decided to kind've [sic] move on."

Her first starring role in a feature film was Kathy Lutz in the 2005 remake of the 1979 horror film, The Amityville Horror. The film was not well received by critics, but was a major success at the worldwide box office, grossing over $108 million. Despite unfavorable reviews, Film Threat praised George and her co-star Ryan Reynolds's performances, stating that they "make a striking couple. Both young and extremely attractive" and that she "does an impeccable American accent, but otherwise she is unremarkable as Kathy Lutz. Her physical beauty is sometimes distracting, but not enough to keep the audience awed by her acting." That same year, she played Deanna Schine in the thriller Derailed, co-starring Clive Owen and Jennifer Aniston, playing the wife of a man embroiled in an affair.

In March 2006, it was announced that she had been cast in the NBC comedy-drama series Lipstick Jungle, based on the novel of the same name by Candace Bushnell. George was to play Nico Reilly, the editor-in-chief of Bonfire Magazine. However, the show underwent significant changes; with George and other castmates being replaced and with executive producers DeAnn Heline and Eileen Heisler, and writers Rand Ravich and Jill Gordon and director Nigel Cole all being fired. George had been personally cast by Bushnell, but left in early 2007 when she was offered the HBO series In Treatment. Also in 2006, she travelled to Brazil to film the horror-thriller Turistas (released in the UK and Ireland as Paradise Lost) with Josh Duhamel and Olivia Wilde. Shooting lasted three months on what was the first Hollywood film to be shot entirely on-location in Brazil, and George — who learned to speak Spanish and Portuguese for the role — said that the experience "made me a better actress; more resilient, tougher."

In 2007, she landed the lead role, Christine, in the biographical drama Music Within, opposite Ron Livingston, which focused on a disability-rights activist in Portland, Oregon. The film had a limited release. In an interview, she said that she "knew that Christine's a true character, and the woman responsible for Richard Pimentel's sort of success in a way. She was the driving force behind him and behind every good man is a good woman, and Christine was that woman." She starred in the British horror-thriller WΔZ, and had a prominent role in the film adaptation of 30 Days of Night, directed by David Slade and co-starring Josh Hartnett. The film was a modest success with an over $75 million worldwide gross.

=== 2008–present: Television and critical acclaim ===
George returned to television in 2008 in the HBO half-hour drama In Treatment, co-starring Gabriel Byrne and Dianne Wiest, receiving a 2009 Golden Globe Award nomination for Best Supporting Actress – Series, Miniseries, or Television Film, and also received a nomination for "Best Actress" at the 2009 Australian Film Institute Awards.

In September 2008, George joined the cast of Grey's Anatomy for eleven episodes as Sadie Harris, a bisexual intern, but in January 2009, it was released that she was leaving the show in a mutual agreement with the producers. Also in 2008, she starred in the film The Betrayed, which was released at the San Diego Film Festival, and was released direct-to-video in the United States on 30 June 2009.

On 9 November 2009, it was announced that George would guest-star in at least two episodes of Fox's Lie to Me playing Clara Musso. George also received the lead role in the Australian-British mystery thriller by Chris Smith titled Triangle, which opened to positive reviews. George also starred in the British thriller film A Lonely Place to Die (2010), directed by Julian Gilbey. She climbed the mountain Ben Nevis for her role in the film.

In November 2010, George was named the new face of L'Oréal Melbourne Fashion Festival. In 2012, George appeared as Rosie in the Australian TV series The Slap and as Sam Hunter in the British TV series Hunted, which was filmed over seven months in London, Scotland and Morocco. An American adaptation of the series, in which George again played the character Rosie, premièred on the NBC network in February 2015. A review of the U.S. series in The New York Times noted George's performance as "particularly beguiling ... As Rosie she is absurd, infuriating, sad, and very funny."

In 2017, she was cast opposite Sean Penn in the television series The First (2018); created by Beau Willimon and filmed in New Orleans, Louisiana.

On May 30, 2025, George was named as part of the cast for New Zealand series Ms. X. She will also lead the BBC-Britbox drama series The Loch Ness Mysteries.

== Other ventures ==
George is credited as the inventor of Style Snaps, a device intended to allow changing pant hem length without sewing. The product is marketed via direct response TV. She has stated that the invention earns her more money than her acting career.

== Public image ==
In November 2012, while promoting the television series Hunted for The Sun-Herald television magazine in Australia, George was quoted as saying: "I don't need credibility from my country anymore, I just need them all to be quiet. If they have nothing intelligent to say, please don't speak to me anymore. I'd rather be having a croissant and a little espresso in Paris or walking my French bulldog in New York City." The response was purportedly spurred by George being tired of repeated questions about her role as Angel Parrish on Home and Away – the role that had originally garnered her fame in Australia – as opposed to questions about her more recent projects. The publication of the article drew significant criticism, specifically from Australian publications. George would later say she was misquoted in the piece, and that the phrases had been "swapped around and put out of context": "I never said that at all. We were laughing and I never said anything negative about my country", she said.

In light of a publicised domestic-violence dispute between George and her boyfriend Jean-David Blanc in 2016, journalist Christine Sams, who had originally published the Sun-Herald article, wrote a public apology, in which she noted: "Many of those people attacking George have directly used those inane comments from my original interview (published years ago) to somehow justify her not receiving sympathy or help now. I just wanted to say sorry Melissa; you don't deserve it."

== Personal life ==
In 1998, George met actor and film director Claudio Dabed in Bali. They married in 2000, and lived in Buenos Aires. By 2011, the couple had divorced.

In 2011, George met French entrepreneur Jean-David Blanc (son of musician Serge Blanc), the founder of AlloCiné, at a BAFTA awards party. Together they have two sons, Raphaël (b. 2014) and Solal (b. 2015). In September 2016, George separated from Blanc following allegations of domestic abuse that purportedly occurred at their home in Paris. Jean-David Blanc was found innocent and discharged on February 5, 2021. George meanwhile was convicted and charged for false and malicious prosecution, defamation, using false certificates in courts, and domestic violence.

Shortly after the incident, George attempted to fly to the United States with the couple's two sons, but was prevented from doing so by French authorities after Blanc alleged she was attempting to kidnap their children. George denied this, and said she had intended to return to France with the children. After investigations and trials, George was convicted and charged to a six months prison probation for attempted child abduction. In a 2017 interview, George said she and Blanc had shared custody of the children, but that she felt trapped in France, unable to move freely between countries with her children; the custody arrangement made between the parties required that Blanc provide written consent before the couple's children were allowed to leave the country.

George became a naturalised American citizen in 2008. In 2017, she stated she had resumed working in the United States, on the series The First, and flew between both countries to "spend the maximum time" with her children. She gave birth in March 2024 to her third child, a son named Lyor. The father is not publicly known.

In July 2026, George secretly welcomed her fourth child, a son whose name has not been publicly disclosed. The announcement was made via an Instagram post by former Vogue Australia editor-in-chief Kirstie Clements, who was travelling through France with George at the time. George, who is based in France, is now a mother of four sons. The father of her third and fourth children has not been disclosed.

== Filmography ==
=== Film ===
Year	Title	Role	Notes
1998	Dark City	May	
1999	The Limey	Jennifer "Jenny" Wilson	
2001	Sugar & Spice	Cleo Miller	
2001	Mulholland Drive	Camilla Rhodes	
2001	New Port South	Amanda	
2003	Down with Love	Elkie	
2005	The Amityville Horror	Kathy Lutz	
2005	Derailed	Deanna Schine	
2006	Turistas	Pru Stagler	
2007	Music Within	Christine	
2007	WΔZ	Helen Westcott	
2007	30 Days of Night	Stella Oleson	
2008	The Betrayed	Jamie	
2009	Triangle	Jess	
2011	A Lonely Place to Die	Alison	
2011	Swinging with the Finkels	Janet	
2012	Between Us	Sharyl	
2013	Felony	Julie Toohey	
2017	The Butterfly Tree	Evelyn	
2018	Don't Go	Hazel	
2021	Peaceful	Anna	

=== Television ===
Year	Title	Role	Notes
1993–1996	Home and Away	Angel Parrish	Regular role, 466 episodes
1997	Fable	Rex Fable	Television film
1997	Hollyweird	Caril Ann	Television film
1997	Roar	Molly	Recurring role, 5 episodes
1997	Murder Call	Petra Salinis	Episode: "Hot Shot"
1999	Silk Stalkings	Fiona Grant	Episode: "A Clockwork Florida Orange"
2000	Tales of the South Seas	Kat	Episode: "The Outlaws"
2001	Thieves	Rita	Main role
2002	Lost in Oz	Alexandra Wilder	Television film
2003	Coupling	Susan	Unaired TV pilot
2003	Friends	Molly	2 episodes
2003	Monk	Jenna Ryan	Episode: "Mr. Monk Goes to the Theater"
2003	Charmed	Freyja	2 episodes
2003	L.A. Confidential	Lynn Bracken	Unsold TV pilot
2003–2004	Alias	Lauren Reed	Main role (season 3); guest star (season 4)
2006	Two Twisted	Mathilda Banks	Episode: "There's Something About Kyanna"
2008	In Treatment	Laura Hill	Main role (season 1)
2008–2009	Grey's Anatomy	Sadie Harris	Recurring role (season 5), 8 episodes
2009	U.S. Attorney	Susan Shelle	Unsold TV pilot
2010	Lie to Me	Clara Musso	3 episodes
2010	Second Chances	Kate Fischer	Television film
2011	Bag of Bones	Mattie Devore	Television film
2011	The Slap	Rosie	Main role (Australian TV series)
2012	Hunted	Sam Hunter / Alex Kent	Main role
2013	Gothica	Fiona Hunter	Television film
2013–2014	The Good Wife	Marilyn Garbanza	Recurring role (season 5), 8 episodes
2015	The Slap	Rosie	Main role (American TV series)
2016	Heartbeat	Dr. Alexandra Panttiere	Main role
2018	The First	Diane Hagerty	Main role
2019	Bad Mothers	Charlotte	Episode: "Episode 1"
2019	Star Trek: Discovery	Vina	Episode: "If Memory Serves"
2020	The Eddy	Allison Jenkins	2 episodes
2021–2023	The Mosquito Coast	Margot	Main role
2026	Ms. X	Mia	TV series
TBA	The Loch Ness Mysteries	DCI Vanessa ‘Nessie’ Keen	Drama series

== Awards and nominations ==
Year	Association	Category	Work	Result
1994	Logie Awards	Best New Talent	Home and Away	Won
1995	Logie Awards	Most Popular Actress	Home and Away	Won
1995	Logie Awards	Gold Logie	Home and Away	Nominated
1996	Logie Awards	Most Popular actress	Home and Away	Nominated
1996	Logie Awards	Gold Logie	Home and Away	Nominated
2004	Saturn Awards	Cinescape Genre Face of the Future Award-Female	Alias	Won
2009	Golden Globe Awards	Best Supporting Actress – Series, Miniseries or Television Film	In Treatment	Nominated
2009	Australian Film Institute	Best international Actress	In Treatment	Nominated
2010	Fright Meter Awards	Best Actress	Triangle	Nominated
2011	Fangoria Chainsaw Awards	Best Actress	Triangle	Nominated
2012	Equity Ensemble Awards	Most Outstanding Performance by an Ensemble in a Television Movie or Miniseries	The Slap	Won
2012	Logie Awards	Most Outstanding Actress	The Slap	Won
2012	Golden Nymph	Outstanding Actress in a drama series	The Slap	Nominated
2015	Film Critics Circle of Australia	Best Supporting Actress	Felony	Nominated
2017	China Australia International Film Festival	Best Actress in a Leading Role	The Butterfly Tree	Won
