= The Betrayed (2008 film) =

- DVD cover
- Directed by: Amanda Gusack
- Written by: Amanda Gusack
- Produced by: Vincent Garcia Newman
- Starring: Melissa George; Oded Fehr; Christian Campbell; Alice Krige
- Cinematography: Roger Vernon
- Edited by: Matthew Booth
- Music by: Deborah Lurie
- Production company: Metro-Goldwyn-Mayer
- Distributed by: MGM Distribution Co.
- Release date: September 27, 2008 (San Diego Film Festival)
- Running time: 98 minutes
- Country: United States
- Language: English

The Betrayed is a 2008 American thriller film, directed by Amanda Gusack from her own screenplay and starring Melissa George, Oded Fehr and Christian Campbell.

== Plot ==
The story follows a young woman as she's put through a psychological journey under the thumb of a mysterious figure who suspects her husband of stealing millions from a crime syndicate.

== Cast ==
- Melissa George ... as Jamie
- Oded Fehr ... as Voice / Alek
- Christian Campbell ... as Kevin
- Alice Krige ... as Falco
- Donald Adams ... as Shuffle / Rathe
- Scott Heindl ... as Chase
- Kevan Kase ... as Officer Gene
- Andrew Wheeler ... as Officer Davis
- Blaine Anderson ... as Officer Wild
