= FuboTV =

American streaming television service

FuboTV, Inc.
- Current logo used since 2023
- Trade name: Fubo
- Formerly: FaceBank Group
- Type: Public subsidiary
- Traded as: NYSE: FUBO
- Industry: Pay television
- Founded: January 1, 2015; 11 years ago
- Founder: David Gandler; Alberto Horihuela; Sung Ho Choi; Benjamin Grad
- Fate: Sold to the Walt Disney Company and merged with Hulu's Live TV service
- Headquarters: 1290 Avenue of the Americas; New York City 10019; U.S.
- Area served: United States; Canada; Spain
- Key people: Alisa Bowen (CEO); Albert Horihuela (COO); Andy Bird (chairman)
- Services: Streaming television
- Revenue: ▲US$1.48 billion (Q3 2026)
- Operating income: ▲ –US$177.8 million (2024)
- Net income: ▲ –US$172.25 million (2023)
- Total assets: ▼US$1.08 billion (2024)
- Total equity: ▼US$180.78 million (2024)
- Owner: Disney (70%)
- Subsidiaries: FuboTV Media, Inc.
- Website: fubo.tv

FuboTV, Inc. and its subsidiary FuboTV Media, Inc., which operates as FuboTV or Fubo, is an American over-the-top sports streaming television service that serves customers in the United States, Canada, and Spain. The service focuses primarily on channels that distribute live sports. FuboTV, Inc. also operates the live TV streaming service Molotov in France.

Based in Midtown Manhattan, New York City, United States, FuboTV was launched on January 1, 2015, as a soccer streaming service. Fubo changed to an all-sports service in 2017, and then to a virtual multichannel video programming distributor (vMVPD) model. As a vMVPD, Fubo still markets itself as a sports-first service, but it has since expanded its programming to include channels that fall under other genres, including ones with reality shows, premium movies and cable news.

In the United States, Fubo offers several packages with different channel lineups, including a base package of over 100 linear content channels, which also include free content streams that are found on competing services like YouTube TV. A number of add-on packages are also available for viewers who want more programming options, including a sports-only bundle, Spanish-language content, premium movie networks or additional features.

On January 6, 2025, the Walt Disney Company announced its intent to acquire a 70% stake in Fubo, and to merge it with Hulu's live TV service. The merger was completed on October 29, 2025.

As of March 2026, FuboTV's streaming services represented a combined 6.2 million subscribers.

== History ==
=== Early years ===
FuboTV was co-founded in January 2015 by David Gandler (CEO), Alberto Horihuela (CMO), and Sung Ho Choi. At launch, FuboTV cost $7 per month and offered livestreams from soccer-centric channels. In early 2017, Fubo pivoted to become a broader streaming service, adding entertainment and news programming in addition to soccer and sports programming from the NFL, NBA, MLB and NHL. During its first five years, investors in FuboTV included AMC Networks, Luminari Capital, Northzone, Sky, and Scripps Networks Interactive. FuboTV was named to Forbes’ Next Billion-Dollar Startups list in 2019.

FuboTV pitched itself as a direct competitor to cable television and live-streaming bundles such as Sling TV and AT&T TV (now DirecTV Stream). In December 2018, Fubo expanded its service into Spain.

Fubo became the second over-the-top internet television service to be integrated with the TV app on Apple TV, iPhone, and iPad. In 2018, the company began offering two simultaneous streams as part of its base subscription package and introduced a third stream for $5.99 per month.

On February 20, 2019, Fubo added channels from Viacom networks. The following month, it expanded its 4K support to include the Big Ten Network.

In May 2019, FuboTV and FanDuel partnered to integrate sports betting data on the live TV streaming service. The deal included carriage of FanDuel's horse racing networks, TVG (now FanDuel TV) and TVG2 (now FanDuel Racing). On June 19, 2019, FuboTV announced that it will be adding the Discovery Networks, joining the line up of Scripps Networks that were acquired by Discovery.

=== 2020 ===
ViacomCBS channels launched on FuboTV in Spain in 2020. On January 1, 2020, FuboTV dropped the Fox Sports Networks, citing increasing carriage costs after the acquisition of the channels by the Sinclair Broadcast Group. FuboTV launched the NHL Network on March 9, 2020, with plans to add the MLB Network and MLB Strike Zone, allowing it to have all four professional sports league networks on its platform.

On March 23, 2020, fuboTV announced it would merge with FaceBank Group, a publicly listed virtual entertainment technology company founded by media technology entrepreneur John Textor, via a reverse triangular merger. The new company was named fuboTV Inc. to be led by original fuboTV CEO David Gandler. The merger closed on April 2, 2020. According to the article, fuboTV plans to leverage Facebank's IP portfolio to create new streaming experiences for consumers and also expand internationally. FaceBank is traded on the OTC exchange and, following the merger, Gandler noted the company plans to uplist to a major stock exchange. Following its merger with FaceBank Group, FuboTV began trading on the OTC under the ticker symbol FUBO. In the months following the merger, John Textor resigned his post as Executive Chairman, and the company named former Warner Music Group Chairman Edgar Bronfman Jr. as Executive Chairman of the Board. Other directors, such as early Spotify investor Par-Jorgen Parson and venture capitalist Daniel Leff were also named to the Board. All three were early investors in FuboTV.

In June 2020, FuboTV announced a long-awaited deal with Disney Media Networks to bring ESPN Inc., and Walt Disney Television (including ESPN and its networks and ABC, along with children's networks such as Disney Channel) to the sports-focused streaming service sometime in the summer. It would go live on August 1. On July 1, 2020, FuboTV dropped WarnerMedia networks, including Cartoon Network, CNN, TBS and TNT.

On September 15, 2020, FuboTV said it expected to close 2020 with 410,000–420,000 subscribers as a result of the return of sports during the COVID-19 pandemic. The company also announced it was approved to list on the New York Stock Exchange (NYSE) "conditional upon successful pricing of this offering, under the ticker symbol FUBO." On October 7, 2020, fuboTV completed its initial public offering as a New York Stock Exchange company, raising roughly $183 million in proceeds. FuboTV began trading on the NYSE under the ticker symbol "FUBO" on October 8, 2020, as fuboTV shares jumped 10% in their market debut.

FuboTV delivered what it said was record revenue and subscriber numbers during the third quarter of 2020. The company also announced its plans to enter the online sports wagering market with details to be announced. In December 2020, FuboTV acquired Balto Sports, which owns contest automation software. The company said the acquisition marked the first step of its online wagering strategy, which will start with free to play games and then expand into wagering integrated with its live streaming video. FuboTV added more premium entertainment with the launch of EPIX and STARZ channels in December 2020. It also reached an agreement with Nexstar Media Group to begin carrying WGN America in January 2021.

Skydance (then known as ViacomCBS) took a stake in FuboTV in December 2020.

=== 2021 ===
In January, FuboTV announced more details of its expansion into online sports wagering. With the December 2020 Balto Sports acquisition, the company said it plans to launch a free to play gaming app by the summer of 2021. The app will be available to all consumers nationwide, whether they are FuboTV subscribers or not. The company also said it plans to integrate free gaming into the FuboTV platform. Additionally, FuboTV announced it intends to acquire sports gaming company Vigtory and will launch its own sportsbook before the end of the year. With the Vigtory acquisition, FuboTV will also receive Vigtory's pipeline of market access deals, including a completed agreement with Iowa through Casino Queen. Like free gaming, the company said it plans to launch the sportsbook as an app first before integrating it into the FuboTV user experience. FuboTV CEO told The Wall Street Journal he expects sports wagering to not only generate more revenue for FuboTV but also make it more likely that customers will pay closer attention to sports and tune in more often.

In its fourth quarter 2020 earnings results reported in March 2021, FuboTV said it exceeded $100 million in quarterly revenue for the first time. Also during its 2020 earnings report, FuboTV said it would launch free-to-play predictive gaming in the third quarter 2021. FuboTV also announced it closed the previously announced Vigtory acquisition and had established Fubo Gaming to oversee its entry into online sports wagering. Fubo Gaming is expected to launch Fubo Sportsbook in the fourth quarter 2021. Fubo also announced it signed agreements with the MLB and NBA to become an Authorized Gaming Operator of each league. These agreements will provide access to official data and include league marks and logos within Fubo Sportsbook once it is rolled out.

FuboTV announced in May 2021 that the first quarter was its strongest in its history, delivering $119.7 million in revenue, an increase of 135% year-over-year, and growing total subscribers to 590,430, up 105% year-over-year. CEO David Gandler called the quarter an "inflection point" for FuboTV as it was the first time the company grew revenue and subscribers sequentially in any first quarter despite seasonality trends.

On June 1, Fast Company reported FuboTV would begin beta testing predictive, free-to-play games and a live stats feature called FanView, both integrated into its streaming video. The beta test would begin during FuboTV's exclusive streams of the South American CONMEBOL 2022 FIFA World Cup qualifying matches that month. The company said they plan to officially launch free gaming timed to the NFL season. FuboTV also said it expects gaming to be an engagement driver and noted it is the first step on its gaming roadmap, which will include the launch of Fubo Sportsbook later in 2021. On June 30, 2021, FuboTV dropped services from A&E Networks, among them included History, A&E and Lifetime.

FuboTV was added to the Russell 2000 Index at the conclusion of the 2021 Russell indexes annual reconstitution in June 2021. In November, FuboTV said that it had reached the one million subscriber mark.

FuboTV launched Fubo Sportsbook, a mobile wagering app integrated with fuboTV's live TV streaming platform, on November 3. The company launched the app in Iowa and said more states are to follow. The company announced they had reached one million subscribers on their third quarter 2021 earnings call. FuboTV also announced it had signed an agreement to acquire France's leading live TV streaming platform, Molotov TV, to fuel its international expansion along with Indian AI startup edisn.ai.

=== 2022–2023 ===
In January 2022, FuboTV acquired the Canadian media rights to the Premier League, replacing DAZN. The company's subsidiary, Fubo Gaming, announced in early February 2022 it had completed 10 market access for Fubo Sportsbook (Arizona, Indiana, Iowa, Louisiana, Mississippi, Missouri, New Jersey, Ohio, Pennsylvania and Texas) and was live in two states (Arizona, Iowa). It promised to launch in additional states, pending requisite regulatory approvals. On May 25, 2022, GAC Living became available on FuboTV.

FuboTV launched pick'em games in June 2022. The company said the free games would be live with select sports directly from its home page. Additionally, FuboTV subscribers can also scan a QR code in the TV watching experience to access Fubo Sportsbook and place real money wagers aligned with their picks. The sportsbook integration went live in the markets where Fubo Sportsbook operates, according to the company. In August 2022, FuboTV said it was putting its sports wagering business under a strategic review. The company abandoned its sportsbook entirely by October.

Ryan Reynolds took an equity stake in FuboTV in August 2022. Reynolds, his Maximum Effort studio and Fubo announced a co-production partnership that will include the launch of the Maximum Effort Channel on FuboTV. Reynolds and his team will create original content for the forthcoming channel.

In December 2022, FuboTV announced content partnerships with Scripps Networks and Sinclair Broadcast Group's 19 Bally Sports regional sports networks. Fubo promised the channels would launch "in the coming weeks," bringing the total number of regional sports channels on the service to over 35.

On December 31, 2022, FuboTV removed channels owned and operated by AMC Networks, including AMC, BBC America, BBC World News, IFC, We TV and Sundance. In a letter to consumers, FuboTV said it would not provide refunds or credits to customers who prepaid for service.

On January 6, 2023, FuboTV began notifying subscribers that they would raise their base subscription package to $74.99 per month. Additionally, for the first time, FuboTV rolled out a regional sports network fee to all subscribers who received such a channel. Customers with one regional sports channel will pay $10.99 a month, while customers who have two or more of those channels will pay $13.99 per month. Two months later, the service rebranded from FuboTV to Fubo, timed with the launch of their national brand campaign.

On June 20, 2023, Fubo launched the Maximum Effort Channel in partnership with Ryan Reynolds. In addition to Fubo, the channel is available on free streaming platforms like Amazon's Freevee, Xumo Play and Tubi. One week later, Fubo updated its Spanish-language package to include content from Canela.TV.

In September 2023, a resident of Illinois filed a proposed class-action lawsuit against Fubo in state court, accusing the company of illegally sharing the private viewing history of its customers with potential third-party advertisers without first obtaining explicit consent. The case was remanded to federal court in October. Around the same time, Fubo was sued by Dish Network for allegedly violating various streaming-related patents. Fubo has denied the accusation. By the end of 2023, Fubo had fewer subscribers than Hulu, YouTube TV, and Sling TV, but was second in net additions of subscribers for the year with 173,000, according to Leichtman Research.

=== 2024 ===
In February 2024, FuboTV filed an antitrust lawsuit against The Walt Disney Company, Hearst Communications, Fox Corporation, and Warner Bros. Discovery over their recent announcement of a streaming sports joint venture (named Venu on May 16, 2024). The streaming joint venture said it would develop a sports-focused streaming service, which was seen as potentially drawing customers away from Fubo. After filing its antitrust lawsuit, Fubo launched a website called "Save My Sports" as part of an outreach effort to rally public support for the lawsuit against the three broadcasters. Soon after, Fubo announced that it had signed a distribution deal with the YES Network to stream New York Yankees games, among other content.

In April 2024, Fubo announced that it had removed Discovery networks content, “including Discovery, HGTV, Food Network and TLC, among others" from its service after failing to reach an agreement with Warner Bros. Discovery. Fubo said in a statement that it was forced to remove the content because Warner Bros. Discovery did not engage in good-faith negotiations and accused Warner Bros. Discovery of "abuse of massive market power that ultimately limits consumer choice."

In June 2024, Comcast announced that it had signed a deal with Fubo to make the streaming service available to its Xfinity Flex or Xumo Stream Box customers, as well as Xumo TVs. In August 2024, a federal judge said Fubo was likely to be successful in its lawsuit against the Venu Sports joint venture and awarded the company a preliminary injunction to stop its launch. Disney, Hearst, Fox, and WBD said they would appeal the ruling, while Fubo said it would continue to press on with its lawsuit against the joint venture.

In September 2024, Fubo announced that it had become the first virtual multichannel video programming distributor (vMVPD) to offer the ability for users to choose their own channels for multiviewing on Roku devices. Those who own Roku's Ultra devices were able to stream up to four channels at once, while those who own the Roku Express 4K and 4K+, along with the Roku Streaming Stick 4K and 4K+, would be able to stream two channels at once. The feature allows users to choose which two to four live channels to watch simultaneously and is available on all Fubo channels, including live sports and news.

In October 2024, an agreement with Chicago Sports Network was announced. The company also said in October that it was launching a standalone subscription service called Premium Subscription Services. The feature allows users to subscribe to specific live and on-demand content on the service without requiring a base channel plan. The move expanded Fubo’s offering to three tiers, including a free version with nearly 200 ad-supported channels, the new Premium Subscription Services (which also includes access to the free version), and its standard vMVPD offering.

In November 2024, Fubo said that it had signed a deal with NBCUniversal to bring 18 NBCU FAST channels to the platform, including Noticias Telemundo Ahora, NBC Sports, and Today All Day. Four channels from Telemundo immediately launched on Fubo’s Spanish-language Latino plan and all English-language channel plans. Fubo said the remaining 14 channels would launch soon on its platform.

=== 2025 ===
On January 6, 2025, Fubo agreed to sell a 70% majority stake in its vMVPD business to Disney and merge with its Hulu + Live TV business. The merged company will be led by Fubo's executive team and remain a public company, albeit with Disney holding majority control of its board. Both services will continue to operate under their respective brands, with Fubo being responsible for carriage negotiations. The deal excludes the Hulu video on-demand service, which will continue to be held exclusively by Disney. As part of the agreement, Fubo also settled with the Venu Sports joint venture, with the consortium planning to make a one-time payment of $220 million. Fubo also reached a carriage agreement for Disney's suite of channels. The merger is expected to be completed between 12 to 18 months, pending regulatory approval. The joint venture was abandoned 4 days later.

Fubo and Disney also announced on January 6, 2025, that they additionally entered into a new carriage agreement that will allow Fubo to create a new Sports & Broadcast skinny bundle that will include Disney’s ABC, ESPN, ESPN2, SECN, ACCN, and ESPN+ networks. In January, Fubo and Ryan Reynolds shut down the Maximum Effort Channel.

In February 2025, Fubo announced that it would start streaming its Fubo Sports linear network on over-the-air channels in more than 100 markets across the United States, including New York, Los Angeles, and Chicago, making the service available to more than 12 million traditional TV households.

In March 2025, Fubo announced an agreement with the Rangers Sports Network, allowing Fubo to stream all available Texas Rangers games over its service, including both pre- and post-game broadcasts.

In April 2025, Fubo ranked 79th in Financial Times' list of The Americas’ Fastest-Growing Companies of 2025, with an absolute growth rate of 528.4% and a compound annual growth rate of 84.5%.

In June 2025, Fubo announced that it had signed a multi-year agreement with sports streaming provider DAZN that would see both companies stream the other's content on their respective services. The announcement came alongside the launch of a new DAZN1 channel on Fubo that would air DAZN's boxing and mixed martial arts content. DAZN said that it would also add the Fubo Sports free ad-supported television (FAST) service, giving its customers access to soccer matches, combat sports events, and other sports-themed content.

On June 26, 2025, Fubo announced a multi-year agreement with Weigel Broadcasting for distribution of seven networks, such as MeTV, Heroes & Icons, MeTV+, MeTV Toons, Catchy Comedy, Movies!, Story Television, and WCIU. Subscribers of Fubo’s Pro and Elite channel plans can now stream Weigel’s national entertainment networks while customers in the Chicago DMA also have access to WCIU-TV’s local sports, news and entertainment programming. WCIU, The U’s sports coverage includes more than 30 games from the WNBA’s Chicago Sky during the 2025 season.

In September 2025, Fubo launched Fubo Sports, a new skinny bundle focused entirely on sports programming. The service, which launched on September 2, offers 28 channels, including ESPN and NFL Network. Fubo also announced that it bundled ESPN's direct-to-consumer Unlimited service with Fubo Sports. The company said Fubo Sports will cost $45.99 for the first month and $55.99 per month thereafter.

On September 30, 2025, the stockholders of FuboTV approved the company's merger with Hulu + Live TV. On October 29, the merger was completed, making Disney the sixth-largest pay-TV operator in the U.S.

On November 8, 2025, FuboTV launched the Fubo Channel Store, allowing customers to subscribe to specific, premium streaming channels, including DAZN One, Hallmark+, MGM+, and others. The Fubo Channel Store launched inside the FuboTV app.

=== 2026 ===
Fubo posted a total of 6.2 million combined subscribers in the first quarter of 2026 and announced plans to make Fubo Sports available for purchase through an agreement with ESPN. In April, the company updated its mobile apps and introduced new features to enhance sports viewing.

In the spring of 2026, Fubo began offering subscription packages of live programming from Hulu Plus Live TV and Hulu Plus Live TV Español.

A previously planned reseller and marketing agreement between Fubo Sports and ESPN.com will be implemented in 2027 offering Fubo Sports subscribers access to ESPN Unlimited, Fox and CBS programming. ESPN.com will provide subscriber links to FuboTV for streaming of live sports coverage. A conversational AI assistant is set to be implemented on the Fubo platform in fall 2026 with initial plans to include Roku, Apple TV and mobile. The feature will enable customers to search their recorded sports programming.

Fubo and The Athletic expanded an existing partnership to broadcast The Athletic’s video content on streaming TV.

In August, Fubo introduced ACC Network Extra (ACCNX) and SEC Network+ (SECN+) enabling subscriber access to live college sporting events.

In a September agreement with the National Hockey League (NHL), Fubo added the regional sports networks of the Carolina Hurricanes, Columbus Blue Jackets, Minnesota Wild and St. Louis Blues for the 2026-27 season. The same month, Fubo introduced an add-on package allowing customers in select markets to purchase their local regional sports networks as part of the lighter Fubo Sports subscription. In November 2026, Fubo gained the rights to the Buffalo Sabres in the team's Canadian territory (the Niagara Peninsula).

In Q3, Fubo reported 5.75 million North American paid subscribers.

== Awards and recognition ==
Fubo earned the highest score in J.D. Power's customer satisfaction survey among live TV streaming providers in 2022, with 789 points in aggregate on a scale of 1,000 possible points, three points higher than Dish Network's Sling TV.

In 2023, Fubo's customer satisfaction score fell to 742, putting it behind YouTube TV (795), Hulu + Live TV (785), Sling TV (772) and DIRECTV Stream (748).

For its 2024 evaluation, J.D. Power gave Fubo a customer satisfaction score of 578, putting it ahead of DirecTV Stream's score of 558. Fubo trailed YouTube TV (651), Hulu + Live TV (635), and Sling TV (613).

In 2026 the company was named among Fast Company's "Most Innovative Companies. and was recognized as one of the "best live TV streaming services" for sports.

== Fubo Sports Network ==

On June 27, 2019, FuboTV launched a free ad supported linear channel called Fubo Sports Network on Xumo. Fubo Sports Network later launched on smart TVs like Samsung TV Plus and LG Channels powered by Xumo and also on The Roku Channel.

After the initial soft-launch, the company added a slate of sports-oriented original programming including: Call It A Night and Drinks With Binks, two talk shows hosted by journalist and comedian Julie Stewart-Binks; The Cooligans, a soccer talk show hosted by New York comedians Alexis Guerreros and Christian Polanco; and The Players Lounge hosted by Soccer Hall of Fame inductee Cobi Jones and PJ Harrison. The company also made the live stream of Fubo Sports Network available on the Fubo Sports Network website. Fubo Sports Network was added to the new Vizio Channels platform in April 2020.

The company announced a partnership with former NBA All Star Gilbert Arenas to bring his No Chill podcast to Fubo Sports Network as a weekly vodcast beginning May 2020. Retitled No Chill with Gilbert Arenas, the show features Arenas and co-host Mike Botticello interviewing athletes, coaches and celebrities. As of May 19, 2020, Fubo Sports Network is available on 75 million devices, according to the company.

On September 10, 2020, professional wrestling promotion Major League Wrestling (MLW) announced that their weekly flagship, MLW Fusion, would move to Fubo Sports Network on November 18. In May 2021, Fubo Sports Network announced it had partnered with Terrell Owens and Matthew Hatchette to turn their podcast, Getcha Popcorn Ready, into a TV show. The new show began airing on Fubo Sports Network later that year.

In January 2022, Fubo reached a six-year sublicense with Fox Sports which gave them the rights to select soccer matches from the UEFA Nations League, European qualifiers to UEFA Euro 2024, UEFA Euro 2024 (5 matches), European qualifiers to FIFA World Cup 2026, European Qualifiers to UEFA Euro 2028, UEFA Euro 2028 (5 matches) and friendly matches played by European nations controlled by UEFA.

In 2025, Fubo Sports Network began being distributed over-the-air. Later that year Fubo signed a deal with the European League of Football (ELF). Fubo Sports aired one game per week, and the playoffs of the highest American Football league in Europe. In 2026, Fubo signed a similar contract with the successor league European Football Alliance.

Following the close of the company's combination with Disney, Fubo launched Fubo Sports Network on Hulu + Live TV in February 2026.

== Supported devices ==
=== TV-connected ===
- Apple TV (4th Generation and newer)
- Roku
- Amazon Fire TV
- Android TV
- Samsung Smart TV (beta)
- LG Smart TV
- Hisense Smart TV
- Vizio SmartCast
- Xbox One
- Xbox Series X/S

=== Mobile ===
- iOS mobile devices
- Android mobile devices
- Chromecast (iOS and Android)

=== Computer ===
- Windows, Mac, and Linux with a compatible browser.
