= Pariscope =

French weekly magazine, 1965 to 2016

- Categories: Entertainment magazine; Film magazine
- Frequency: Weekly
- First issue: 1965
- Final issue: October 2016
- Company: Reworld Media
- Country: France
- Based in: Paris
- Language: French
- Website: Pariscope
- ISSN: 1287-0633

Pariscope was a weekly magazine available at Parisian newsstands between 1965 and 2016.

Pariscope was a moderately-priced magazine, established in 1965. Hachette Filipacchi Médias sold the printed version of Pariscope to Reworld Media in 2014. After 51 years of publication, the final issue was published the week of 18 October 2016.

== See also ==
- L'Officiel des spectacles – Weekly cultural guide to Paris
