= L'Officiel des spectacles =

Weekly cultural guide to Paris

L'Officiel des spectacles is a weekly cultural guide to Paris founded by Jean-Philippe Richemond in 1946. Its purpose is to list every cultural event in Paris and Île-de-France.

== History ==
The first edition appeared on 25 September 1946, under the title Cette semaine (This Week). Its purpose was to inform its readers, in the most precise and concise way possible, of every event taking place that week that was "not of a political, religious, or controversial nature." Rather, its intention was to provide information about everything that is leisure, everything that is Paris.

The first publication contained 32 pages and cost 10 francs. At the time, the format of the magazine comprised eight sections: theatre, cinema, music, dance, cabarets, expositions, museums and churches of Paris. The hallmark of the publication was the information that would lead to its success:

- hours, prices, and addresses of each cultural event
- information about each film appearing that week in Paris and Île de France
- descriptions of plays and exhibitions

Between September 1946 and July 2013, 3,471 editions were published with one sole interruption (of one week, during the events of May 1968).

In its early years, several famous French writers wrote columns in the pages of the magazine, including Maurice Rostand, from February 1948 to February 1949; Sacha Guitry, from October 1952 to May 1954; and André Roussin beginning in June 1954.

In 1973 the format was established that is still utilised today. The contents of the sections have progressively evolved to adapt to the changing language and mores of Parisians and inhabitants of Île de France.

In 2013, the guide was divided into nine major sections:

- cinemas
- concerts
- theatres
- museums & exhibitions
- à travers Paris (monuments, parks and gardens, hidden places, cemeteries...)
- activities for children
- cabarets
- restaurants

Since 1 June 2013, L'Officiel des spectacles has been published by Offi Médias, the offspring of the association between Christophe Richemond, the son of Jean-Philippe Richemond, and Xavier Pauporté, the director of TheatreOnline.

== Publication and distribution ==
In 2013, the weekly publication figures were reported to be 72,404 copies, and the total distribution was 48,079 copies.

== See also ==
- Pariscope
