= Serge Blanc (violinist) =

French violinist (1929–2013)

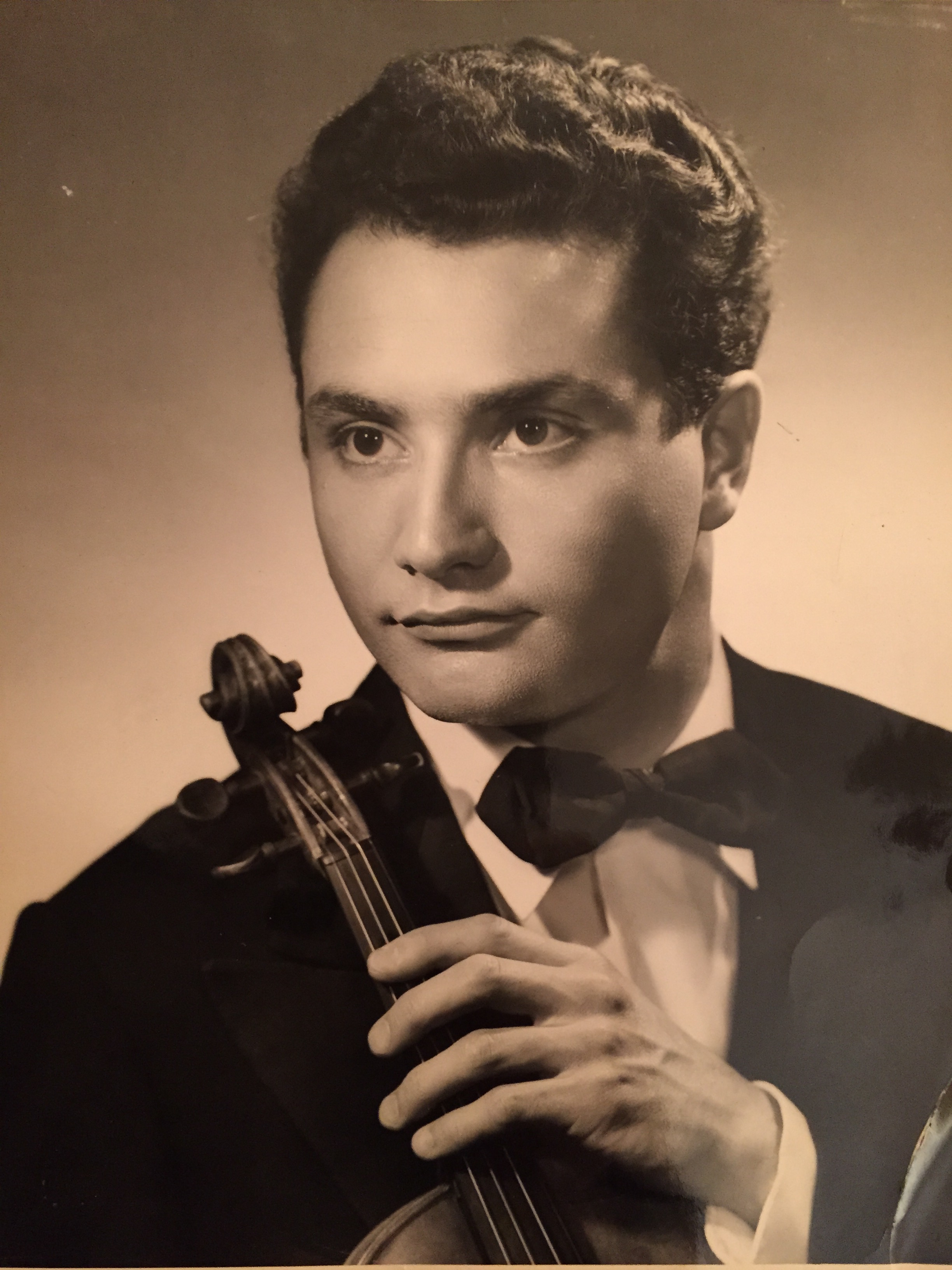
- Born: 31 December 1929; Paris, France
- Died: 29 June 2013 (aged 83); Paris
- Education: Conservatoire de Paris; Juilliard School of Music
- Occupations: Classical violinist; Conductor; Academic; Music editor
- Organizations: Serge Blanc Quartet; Pro Arte Quartet; Da Camera Trio; Orchestre de l'Opéra national de Paris; Orchestre philharmonique de Radio France; Conservatoire de Paris
- Spouse: Denise Blanc (née Souksi)
- Children: Jean David Blanc; Emmanuel Blanc
- Awards: Long-Thibaud-Crespin Competition; Enescu Competition
- Website: www.sergeblanc.com

Serge Blanc (31 December 1929 – 29 June 2013) was a French classical violinist. A child prodigy trained at the Conservatoire de Paris, he performed from the age of 11 in Paris with the Orchestre Colonne and the Pasdeloup Orchestra. He studied further at the Juilliard School of Music and played at the Tanglewood Festival. Back in France, he founded several chamber music ensembles and became principal of the second violins at the Orchestre de l'Opéra national de Paris. For several years, he conducted the Orchestre philharmonique de Radio France, but then returned to the opera orchestra. He taught at the Conservatoire de Paris, and edited Bach's Sonatas and Partitas for Solo Violin.

== Early life ==
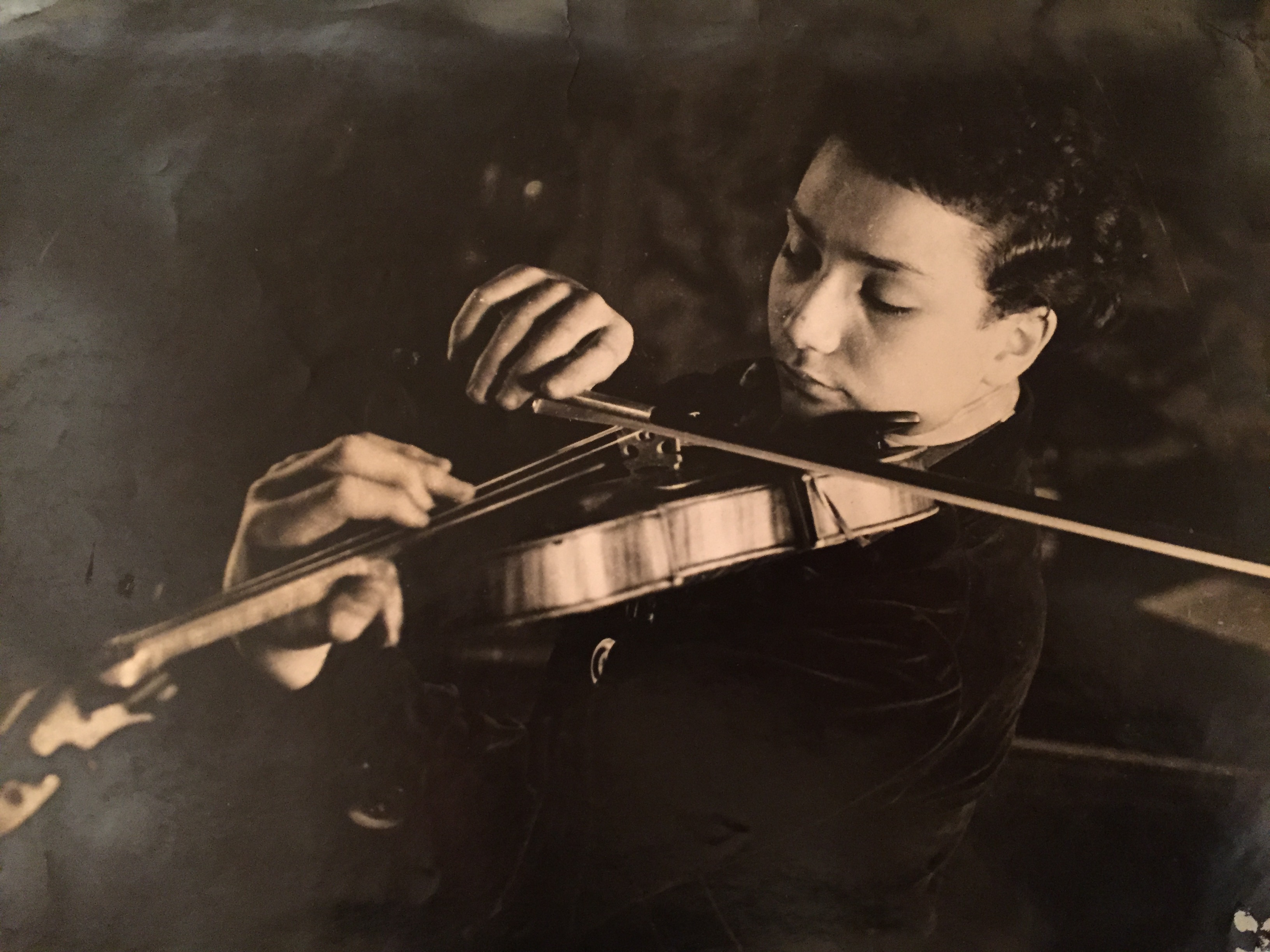
Serge Blanc, during the 1940s

Born in Paris on 31 December 1929, Blanc began studying violin at the age of six. He passed the entrance exam to the Conservatoire de Paris at age ten and studied with Jules Boucherit. He was awarded the First prize for violin three years later, later also the Prix d'Honneur for chamber music.

Being of Romanian-Jewish descent, Blanc had to be hidden during the years of Nazi occupation shortly after he passed the entrance exam, by his teacher Jules Boucherit, who was named Righteous Among the Nations for having protected Jews during the WWII. Boucherit and Claude Delvincourt, then the conservatories director and a resistance fighter, still organized public recitals for boy.

In 1941, at age eleven, he played as a soloist with the Orchestra of the Colonne Concerts conducted by Louis Fourestier. At age thirteen, he played Mozart's Violin Concerto No. 2 and Saint-Saëns's Havanaise with the Pasdeloup Orchestra. He played another recital at the Salle Gaveau at age 15, which was praised by the press, and musicians such as Alfred Cortot with whom he played violin sonatas by Reynaldo Hahn and Gabriel Fauré in concert.

== Adult career ==
In both 1946 and 1947, Blanc was sent on official tours by the Ministry of Fine Arts, to represent France in Europe. In 1949, he won the Long-Thibaud-Crespin Competition. He met George Enescu who influenced him for a long time, and with whom he played in concert at the Salle Gaveau. He also collaborated with Nadia Boulanger until she died in 1979.

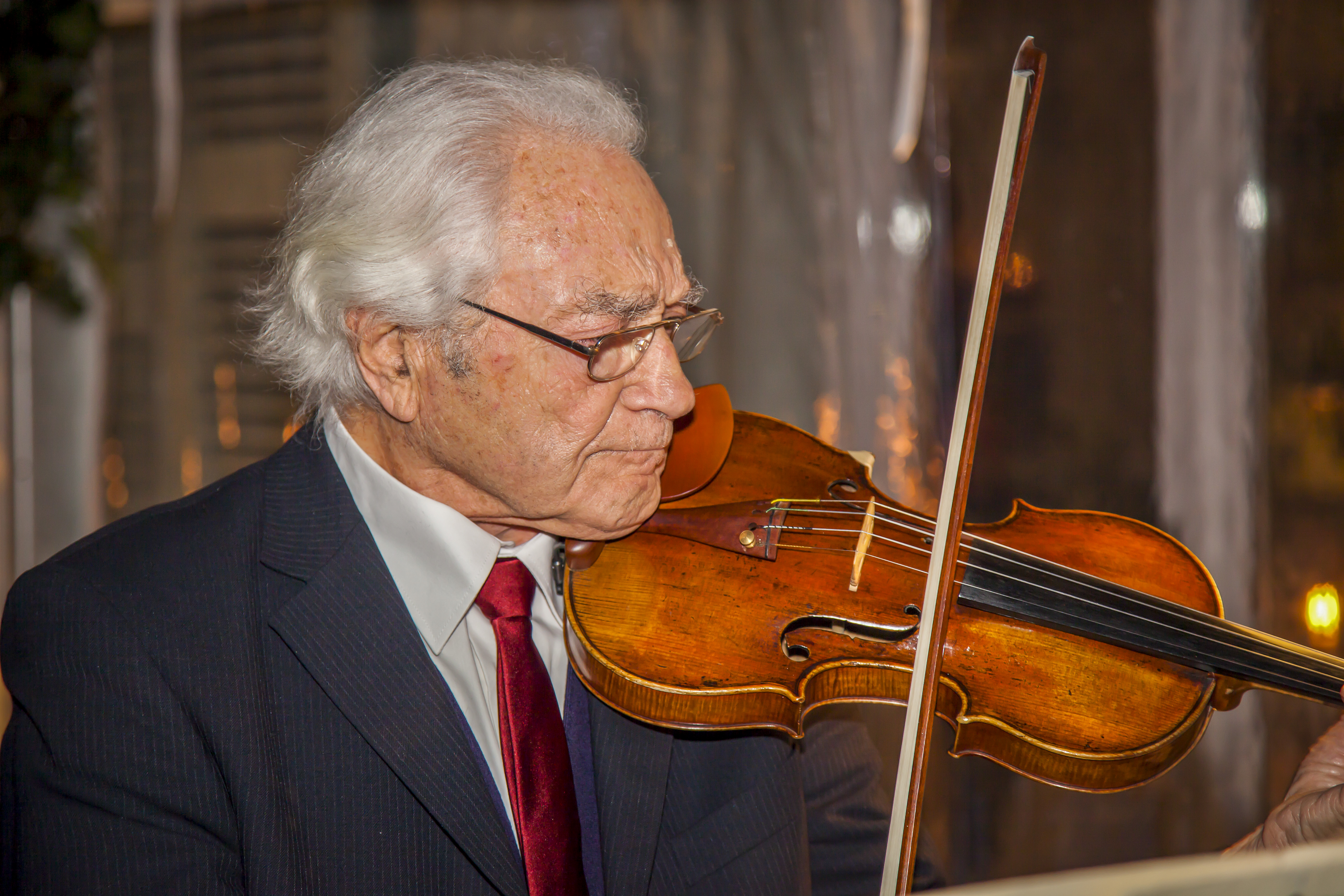
Serge Blanc, in December 2011

In 1952, Blanc left for the United States. He played at the Tanglewood Music Festival organized by the Boston Symphony Orchestra, conducted by Charles Munch. A year later, he played there with Leonard Bernstein, whose Serenade after Plato's "Symposium" he would record as the first in France. Blanc received several scholarships to the Juilliard School of Music where he also studied conducting with Ivan Galamian, and graduated. He won the Jascha Heifetz Competition at the Berkshire Music Center. He returned to France where he founded the Serge Blanc Quartet. In 1958, he won the Enescu Competition in Bucharest, along with Pierre Vozlinsky. He founded the Pro Arte Quartet, then the Da Camera Trio, with whom he toured in France and worldwide, with pianist Odette Gartenlaub, violist Christos Michalakakos and pianist Antonio Ruiz-Pipó, among others. Ruiz-Pipó composed a Concerto for Violin and String Orchestra in 1987, dedicated to Blanc.

In 1962, Blanc joined the Orchestre de l'Opéra national de Paris as principal of the second violon section. In 1973, he was appointed musical director of the Orchestre philharmonique de Radio France. There he invited conductors such as Bernstein, Sergiu Celibidache and Lorin Maazel. He left Radio France two years later, and took his place again in the orchestra where he stayed until his retirement. Blanc died in Paris on 29 June 2013.

== Pedagogy ==
Blanc was professor at the École normale de musique de Paris where he created the chamber music class. Then he was violin and chamber music teacher at the Conservatoire de Paris, and gave private lessons where he taught mainly chamber music. Based on the teaching by Enescu, Blanc collected and annotated Bach's Sonatas and Partitas for Solo Violin, which Enescu called "the Himalayas of the violinists". Having studied them for half a century, he published a pedagogical edition with recommendations for phrasing, tempo, fingering, and expression.
